= List of generals of the Lithuanian military =

List of generals of the Lithuanian Armed Forces includes people that were awarded the rank of general by the independent Republic of Lithuania in 1918–40 or since 1990.

== Interwar ==
There were 54 generals awarded the rank in interwar Lithuania. Seven of them earned their rank in a foreign military, specifically, in the Imperial Russian Army, the Russian White Army, and the British Army. Four men earned rank of general in a foreign military and served in the Lithuanian Army, but were not awarded the rank of general in Lithuania and are therefore not included in the list below.

On 13 September 1919, Lithuania established two ranks of generals – lieutenant general and general. On 11 December 1936, these ranks were changed to brigadier general, divisional general, and general. After the Soviet occupation of Lithuania on 15 June 1940, the Lithuanian Army was repressed and its remains were absorbed into the 179th Rifle and 184th Rifle Divisions of the Red Army and adopted Russian ranks.

#	Name	Born	Enlisted	Retired	Died	Promoted general
1	Edvardas Adamkavičius	1888-03-31	1918-12-01	1940-06-25	1957-05-10	1933-09-06 Lieutenant general 1936-12-11 Brigadier general 1937-02-16 Divisional general
2	Juozas Barzda-Bradauskas	1896-01-14	1919-01-15	1940	1953-10-07	1938-11-23 Brigadier general
3	Jonas Bulota	1855-04-18	1919-07-01	1930-06-21	1942-02-08	1918-11-18 Lieutenant general 1930-06-21 General
4	Julius Čaplikas	1888-06-01	1918-11-20	1935-11-03	1941-07-30	1935-02-14 Lieutenant general
5	Jonas Černius	1898-01-06	1919-03-10		1977-07-03	1937-11-23 Brigadier general 1940-12-29 Major general (Note: Red Army rank after the Soviet occupation of Lithuania)
6	Frank Percy Crozier	1879-01-09	1919-09-19	1920-03-01	1937-08-31	1919-09-19 Major general (Note: First promoted to general in the British Army)
7	Teodoras Daukantas	1884-09-20	1923-12-24	1929-05-11	1960-04-10	1928-05-06 Lieutenant general
8	Stasys Dirmantas	1887-11-02	1919-02-07	1938-04-21	1975-01-26	1937-02-16 Brigadier general
9	Jonas Galvydis-Bikauskas	1864-12-15	1918-11-23	1926-08-21	1943-07-16	1919-10-18 Lieutenant general 1926-08-21 General
10	Zenonas Gerulaitis	1894-12-22	1918-11-10	1941	1945-04-20	1931-12-22 Lieutenant general 1936-12-11 Brigadier general 1939-06-13 Divisional general 1940-12-29 Major general
11	Viktoras Giedrys	1894-03-24	1919-02-10	1940-08-24	1955-04-14	1939-06-13 Brigadier general
12	Juozas Grigaitis	1881-02-28	1919-05-21	1926-10-15	1947-01-09	1926-08-13 Lieutenant general
13	Vincas Grigaliūnas-Glovackis	1885-08-21	1918-11-10	1934-01-18	1964-05-16	1927-02-16 Lieutenant general 1934-01-18 General
14	Antanas Gustaitis	1898-03-27	1919-03-15	1941-01-01	1941-10-16	1937-11-23 Brigadier general
15	Jonas Jackus	1894-04-23	1919-01-03	1935-01-36	1977-02-03	1931-12-22 Lieutenant general
16	Jonas Juodišius	1892-06-18	1919-01-26	1941	1950-12-18	1939-06-13 Brigadier general 1940-12-29 Major general
17	Vladas Karvelis	1901-04-11	1919-07-06	1961	1946-01-06	1938-12-31 Brigadier general 1940-12-29 Major general
18	Maksimas Katche	1897-10-05	1919-04-16	1922-10-07	1933-06-10	1920-03-01 Lieutenant general
19	Konstantas Kleščinskis	1879-05-01	1919-05-04	1923-08-08	1927-05-31	1922-01-06 Lieutenant general
20	Juozas Kraucevičius	1879-03-31	1920-06-12	1927-01-27	1964-03-04	1920-09-01 Lieutenant general (Note: First promoted to general in the White Army)
21	Petras Kubiliūnas	1894-05-16	1919-08-04	1934-06-07	1946-08-22	1929-11-23 Lieutenant general
22	Jurgis Kubilius	1875-03-28	1918-11-23	1926-08-13	1961-03-29	1919-11-18 Lieutenant general 1926-08-13 General
23	Aleksandras Kurkauskas	1882-03-10	1920-12-04	1930-09-18	1945?	1925-05-30 Lieutenant general
24	Kazys Ladiga	1894-01-06	1918-12-12	1927-08-24	1941-12-29	1925-05-15 Lieutenant general
25	Pranas Liatukas	1876-01-29	1918-12-05	1920-09-05	1945-09-02	1919-10-07 Lieutenant general
26	Antanas Martusevičius	1863-02-25	1921-04-20	1922-11-08	1944-09-09	1921-05-27 Lieutenant general (Note: First promoted to general in the Imperial Russian Army)
27	Vladas Mieželis	1894-11-26	1922-01-27	1940-06-25	1986-06-04	1938-11-23 Brigadier general
28	Kazys Musteikis	1894-11-22	1918-12-01	1940-06-15	1977-06-06	1937-02-16 Brigadier general
29	Vladas Nagevičius	1881-06-17	1918-11-23	1940-06-25	1954-09-15	1920-05-14 Lieutenant general 1936-12-11 Brigadier general
30	Stasys Nastopka	1881-06-19	1918-11-23	1924-07-23	1939-10-19	1919-10-08 Lieutenant general
31	Kazys Navakas	1894-12-09	1920-12-07	1940-07-29	1945-04-02	1937-02-16 Brigadier general
32	Motiejus Pečiulionis	1888-01-31	1919-02-01	1936-01-16	1960-01-26	1935-02-14 Lieutenant general
33	Povilas Plechavičius	1890-02-01	1918-11-23	1929-02-10	1973-12-19	1929-02-10 Lieutenant general
34	Klemensas Popeliučka	1892-06-29	1919-04-12	1940-06-25	1948-10-25	1935-02-14 Lieutenant general 1936-12-11 Brigadier general
35	Stasys Pundzevičius	1893-09-02	1919-07-04	1940-12-11	1980-10-20	1935-11-22 Lieutenant general 1936-12-11 Brigadier general 1938-11-23 Divisional general
36	Leonas Radus-Zenkavičius	1874-02-21	1921-02-14	1928-02-09	1946-04-12	1921-03-12 General
37	Valerijonas Ramanauskas	1856-12-17	1919-01-11	1924-03-30	?	1920-05-13 Lieutenant general
38	Stasys Raštikis	1896-09-13	1919-01-15	1940-12-20	1985-05-03	1937-11-23 Brigadier general 1940-04-23 Divisional general
39	Mikas Rėklaitis	1895-09-06	1919-01-15	1940-06-25	1976-03-31	1935-11-22 Lieutenant general 1936-12-11 Brigadier general 1938-11-23 Divisional general
40	Bronius Skomskis	1864-10-25	1921-01-14	1926-08-13	1935-03-18	1921-03-12 Lieutenant general
41	Kazys Skučas	1894-03-14	1919-01-15	1939-03-31	1941-07-30	1939-02-15 Brigadier general
42	Petras Šniukšta	1877-11-24	1919-07-07	1935-11-02	1952-11-22	1925-05-15 Lieutenant general 1935-11-02 General
43	Juozas Stanaitis	1865-08-13	1921-04-01	1923-12-31	1925-07-12	1922-08-02 Lieutenant general
44	Vytautas Stomma	1868-03-13	1921-05-13	1922-11-03	1947-10-26	1921-07-14 Lieutenant general
45	Jonas Sutkus	1893-04-15	1918-11-30	1937-11-10	1942-12-10	1931-12-22 Lieutenant general 1936-12-11 Brigadier general
46	Pranas Tamašauskas	1878-04-13	1918-12-05	1935-08-29	1951-11-27	1928-02-16 Lieutenant general 1935-08-29 General
47	Kazys Tallat-Kelpša	1893-10-28	1919-01-21	1940-06-25	1968-02-22	1935-11-22 Lieutenant general 1936-12-11 Brigadier general
48	Pranas Vaiciuška	1876-08-15	1919-06-04	1920-05-21	1939-09-21	1919-11-18 Lieutenant general
49	Mykolas Velykis	1884-11-12	1918-11-21	1927-02-05	1955-01-24	1927-02-05 Lieutenant general
50	Emilis Vimeris	1885-09-28	1919-02-03	1940-06-25	1974-10-28	1929-11-23 Lieutenant general 1936-12-11 Brigadier general
51	Vincas Vitkauskas	1890-10-04	1919-02-01	1954-11-01	1965-03-03	1935-11-22 Lieutenant general 1936-12-11 Brigadier general 1939-06-13 Divisional general 1940-08-30 Major general 1940-12-29 Lieutenant general
52	Andrius Zarinas	1865-07-18	1919-03-19	1926-10-15	?	1920-03-08 Major general 1926-10-15 General
53	Vincas Žilys	1898-02-02	1919-02-17	1941	1972-10-09	1939-12-31 Brigadier general 1940-12-29 Major general
54	Silvestras Žukauskas	1860-12-31	1918-12-10	1928-01-26	1937-11-26	1920-10-05 General
Notes:

Four generals of the Imperial Russian Army served in the Lithuanian Army but were not officially recognized as generals in Lithuania:

1. Witold Dołęga-Otocki (in Lithuanian known as Vytautas Otockis or Otauskas; 1872–1923), claimed to be a general who lost his documents. He served in the Lithuanian army from May 1919 to March 1920. He later joined the Polish Army.
2. Kyprian Kandratovich (1859–1932) served from 24 November to 24 December 1918
3. Rapolas Okulič-Kazarinas (1857–1919) served from 28 March to 27 April 1919
4. Vladas Dionizas Slaboševičius (1861–1919) served from 1 July to 28 September 1919

== Anti-Soviet resistance ==
Three men were posthumously awarded the rank of general for their contributions to the anti-Soviet resistance, in particular the Lithuanian Liberty Army, the Union of Lithuanian Freedom Fighters and the Lithuanian partisan movement in 1998. They did not serve as generals in the Lithuanian Army as it ceased to exist in 1940.

#	Name	Born	Died	Promoted general
1	Adolfas Ramanauskas	1918-03-06	1957-11-29	1998-01-26 Brigadier general (posthumous)
2	Kazimieras Veverskis	1913-12-09	1944-12-28	1998-12-19 Brigadier general (posthumous)
3	Jonas Žemaitis	1909-03-15	1954-11-26	1949-02-16 General of the Lithuanian partisans 1998-01-26 Brigadier general (posthumous)

== Since 1990 ==
On 11 March 1990, Lithuania restored its independence and reestablished the Lithuanian Armed Forces. Initially, there were two general ranks (lieutenant general and general), but the system was changed in 1998 to three ranks and again in 2023 to four ranks: brigadier general, major general, lieutenant general and general. In the Lithuanian Naval Force, the equivalent ranks are flotilla admiral, counter admiral, viceadmiral and admiral.

Branch	Name	Born	Retired	Died	Promoted general
Army	Jonas Andriškevičius	1944-07-29	1999-11		1993-11-18 Major general
Army	Zenonas Kulys	1947-05-04	2000-02-21		1995-11-20 Brigadier general
Navy	Raimundas Saulius Baltuška	1937-08-31	1999-05-03	2016-04-09	1997-08-29 Flotilla admiral
Army	Jonas Algirdas Kronkaitis	1935-02-01	?		1999 Brigadier general 2001 Major general
Army	Valdas Tutkus	1960-12-27	2009-07-14		2001-11-23 Brigadier general 2004-06-23 Major general 2007-11-23 Lieutenant general
Army	Česlovas Jezerskas	1949-05-14	2007-05-28		2004-03-25 Brigadier general
Air Force	Edvardas Mažeikis	1961-11-18	2018-02-12		2004-11-23 Brigadier general 2011-07-28 Major general
Army	Arvydas Pocius	1957-05-14	2014-08-14		2004-06-30 Brigadier general 2009-07-27 Major general 2011-07-28 Lieutenant general
Army	Algis Vaičeliūnas	1964-11-13	2018-11-23		2004-11-23 Brigadier general
Navy	Kęstutis Macijauskas	1961-03-12	2019-03-12		2005-02-06 Flotilla admiral
Army	Vitalijus Vaikšnoras	1961-04-23	2019-05-07		2005-02-14 Brigadier general 2007-11-06 Major general
Army	Vytautas Jonas Žukas	1962-06-01	2019-07-23		2007-11-23 Brigadier general 2010-06-28 Major general 2015-06-22 Lieutenant general
Army	Gintautas Zenkevičius	1962-09-24	2020-09-24	2021-11-19	2008-11-23 Brigadier general 2019-11-15 Major general
Army	Vilmantas Tamošaitis	1966-04-20			2012-09-10 Brigadier general
Army	Almantas Leika	1968-11-25			2011-07-28 Brigadier general 2012-07-09 Major general (temporary)
Army	Valdemaras Rupšys	1967-05-02			2016 Brigadier general 2018 Major general 2019-11-18 Lieutenant general 2023-06-01 General
Army	Raimundas Vaikšnoras	1970-11-12			2018-02-06 Brigadier general
Navy	Arūnas Mockus	1969-10-25			2018-11-23 Flotilla admiral
SOF	Modestas Petrauskas	1974-06-14			2018-11-23 Brigadier general
Army	Remigijus Baltrėnas	1974			2020-07-22 Brigadier general 2022-12-27 Major general
Army	Mindaugas Steponavičius	1974-08-12			2020-07-22 Brigadier general 2022-12-27 Major general
Army	Artūras Radvilas	1973-02-16			2021-07-01 Brigadier general
Army	Alvydas Šiuparis	1970-06-06			2021-07-01 Brigadier general

Temporary promotions to general were given to two individuals:

- Gintaras Bagdonas on 13 March 2007 to brigadier general
- Artūras Leita on 23 November 2007 and 11 January 2011 to brigadier general
