= Juozas Kraucevičius =

Lithuanian general (1879–1964)

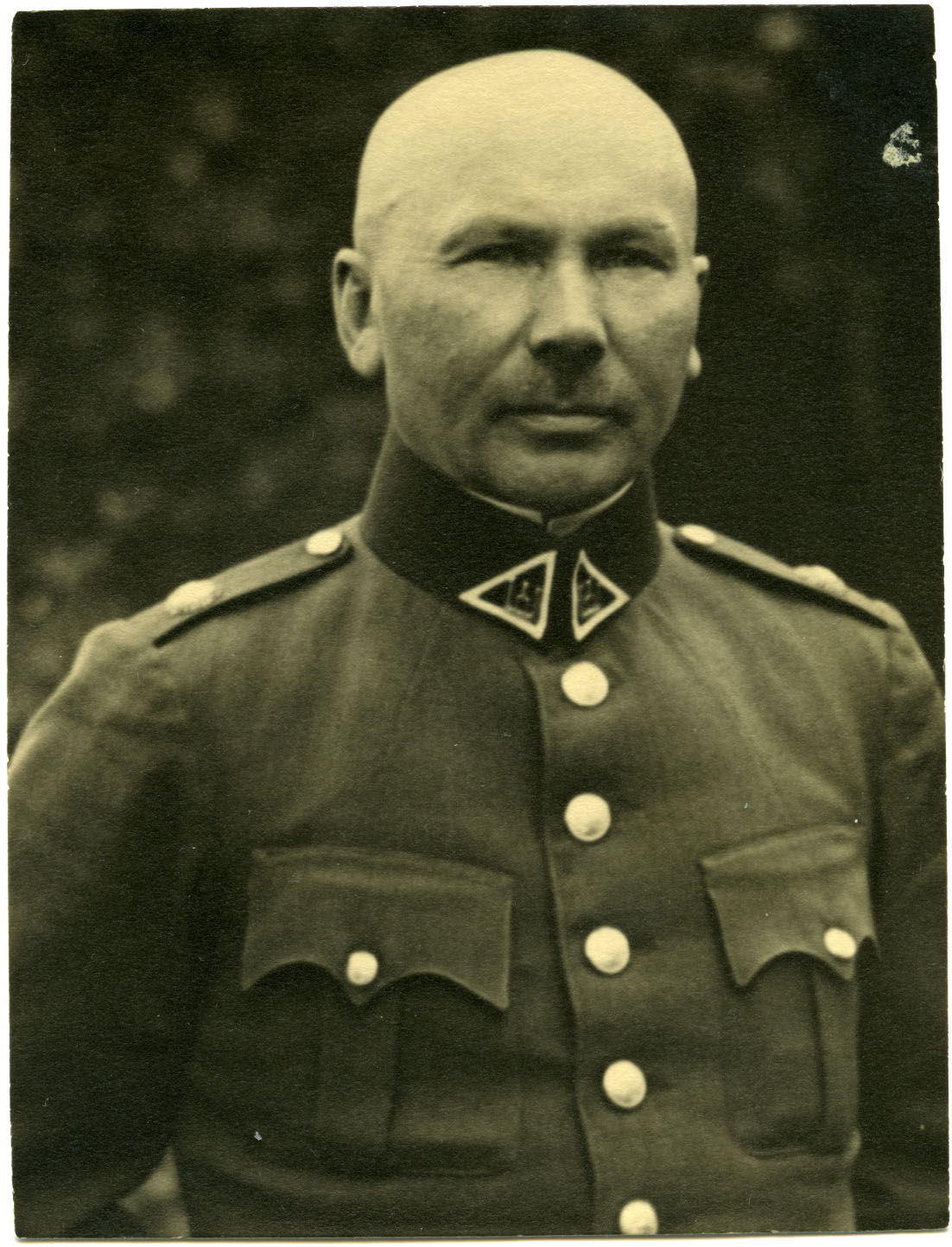
- Kraucevičius around 1925
- Born: 31 March 1879; Sprakšiai, Russian Empire
- Died: 4 March 1964 (aged 84); Kaunas, then part of Lithuanian SSR, Soviet Union
- Alma mater: Saint Petersburg Polytechnic Institute; Vilnius Military School; Officers' Aeronautical School
- Relatives: Jonas Kraucevičius (brother)
- Military career
- Allegiance: Russian Empire (1898–1917); White movement (1917–1920); Lithuania (1920–1927)
- Branch: Russian Imperial Army; Imperial Russian Air Service; Volunteer Army; Lithuanian Air Force; Lithuanian Army
- Rank: Lieutenant general
- Commands: 17th Corps Aviation Detachment; 5th Aviation Division; Lithuanian Air Force; Lithuanian Army
- Conflicts: Russo-Japanese War (Battle of Mukden); World War I Russian Civil War; Polish–Lithuanian War
- Awards: Order of the Cross of Vytis

Juozas Kraucevičius (Russian: Осип Осипович Кравцевич; 31 March 1879 – 4 March 1964) was a military pilot and officer in the Russian Imperial Army, Volunteer Army, and later the Lithuanian Army. He was the acting supreme commander of the Lithuanian Army from 29 May 1921 to 11 February 1922.

After two years of study at the Saint Petersburg Polytechnic Institute, Kraucevičius dropped out and joined the Russian Imperial Army. He graduated from the Vilnius Military School in 1901. He participated in the Russo-Japanese War and fought in the Battle of Mukden. In 1912, he transferred to the newly formed Imperial Russian Air Service. He flew combat missions during World War I and rose to the rank of polkovnik. In 1916, he was appointed aviation inspector of the Northern Front but left the army after the February Revolution and joined the White movement. He commanded aviation in the Volunteer Army of Anton Denikin and was promoted to major general in 1919.

In June 1920, Kraucevičius joined the Lithuanian Army and quickly became commander of its aviation unit. Later that year, the unit participated in the Polish–Lithuanian War and the Żeligowski's Mutiny; Kraucevičius personally flew six missions. In addition to his command of the aviation unit, Kraucevičius was the acting supreme commander of the Lithuanian Army from May 1921 to February 1922. Kraucevičius worked to reorganize, strengthen, and enlarge the aviation unit. He worked to increase prestige of the unit, increase pilots pay and benefits, purchase new planes, and enlarge the Aleksotas Airport. However, Lithuanian officers accused him of nepotism and discrimination in favor of Russian pilots. He retired to the reserves in February 1927.

Kraucevičius worked as a representative of Škoda. This allowed him to escape to Prague when Lithuania was occupied by the Soviet Union in 1940. He returned to Lithuania and was arrested by the NKVD in 1946 and sentenced to ten years in Gulag. He was released in 1954 and returned to Lithuania.

== Biography ==
=== Early life ===
Kraucevičius was born on 31 March 1879 in Sprakšiai near Linkuva in northern Lithuania (then part of the Russian Empire). His father was a Lithuanian Roman Catholic, while his mother was a Russian Eastern Orthodox who was from a noble family. Initially, he was baptized as Catholic, but later converted to Eastern Orthodoxy. His father owned a 19-hectare (47-acre) farm. His brother Jonas Kraucevičius also joined the military and rose to the rank of colonel.

=== Russian Imperial Army ===
Kraucevičius attended Panevėžys Gymnasium and enrolled at the Saint Petersburg Polytechnic Institute in 1896. However, after two years he dropped out and volunteered for the Russian Imperial Army in August 1898. He was assigned to the 113th Infantry Regiment. In May 1899, he completed basic training in the regiment and was sent to study at the Vilnius Military School. Upon graduation in August 1901, he was promoted to podporuchik and assigned to the 179th Infantry Regiment.

During the Russo-Japanese War, he was transferred to the 36th Infantry Regiment with which he fought in the Battle of Mukden. He distinguished himself in battle and was awarded the Order of Saint Anna (4th class) for bravery. In February 1906, he departed Vladivostok and returned to the 179th Infantry Regiment. He was promoted to shtabs-kapitan in September 1909. He commanded the regiment's intelligence unit from April 1908 to September 1912 when he was reassigned to the newly formed Imperial Russian Air Service.

=== Imperial Russian Air Service ===
Assigned to the Air Service in September 1912, Kraucevičius first attended theoretical courses and then the Officers' Aeronautical School where he learned to fly the Nieuport airplanes. He graduated in September 1913 and in December was promoted to commander of the 17th Corps Aviation Detachment. During World War I, Kraucevičius flew 60 combat missions (flight time 74 hours and 45 minutes) by April 1915. He was injured once in August 1914.

He was promoted to podpolkovnik in June 1915 and appointed commander of the 5th Aviation Division in October 1915. In December 1916, he was further promoted to polkovnik and appointed aviation inspector of the Northern Front.

=== White Army ===
Kraucevičius was a monarchist (his wife Nadezhda Filimonovna Lashkevich was a Russian noblewoman). After the February Revolution, he left the Russian Army and lived in Ukraine and Crimea. In December 1917, he joined the Volunteer Army commanded by Anton Denikin. Kraucevičius organized and led the army's aviation. Denikin promoted him to major general on 24 January 1919. The Volunteer Army suffered major defeats in mid-1919 and the last known order signed by Kraucevičius was dated 1 September 1919. He then considered joining the Army of Wrangel but Pyotr Wrangel selected his old friend Vyacheslav Tkachov to lead the aviation units. Therefore, Kraucevičius decided to return to Lithuania. He departed Crimea at the end of 1919 and traveled for several months through Constantinople, Bulgaria, Serbia, Austria, and Germany before reaching Lithuania.

=== Lithuanian Army ===
==== 1920–1921 ====
Kraucevičius was mobilized into the Lithuanian Army in June 1920 and became commander of the aviation unit on 10 July 1920. At the time, Lithuania had about 30 airplanes, mostly captured from the Bermontians at the end of 1919, but they required repairs and men needed training. The unit also suffered from low morale and participated in the Kaunas garrison mutiny in February 1920. Kraucevičius worked to reorganize, strengthen, and enlarge the aviation unit. Later that year, the unit participated in the Polish–Lithuanian War. It conducted 93 reconnaissance and combat missions during the Żeligowski's Mutiny; Kraucevičius personally participated in six of them.

From 23 March to 12 April 1921, Kraucevičius was the acting commander of the Lithuanian Army while commander Silvestras Žukauskas was on vacation. In addition to his command of the aviation unit, Kraucevičius was the acting supreme commander of the Lithuanian Army from 29 May 1921 to 11 February 1922. In this role, he paid particular attention to military education. In December 1921, as tensions rose with Poland, Kraucevičius issued a top secret order to the military to be ready for combat and rafted defence plans.

==== 1922–1927 ====
Kraucevičius continued to lead the aviation unit. Kraucevičius worked to recruit aviation officers and turn aviation into a prestigious unit. In May 1923, there were 71 approved positions, but only 38 officers. Kraucevičius worked to increase pay, benefits, and social guarantees to compensate for the danger faced by pilots. He also worked to acquire new airplanes. He considered purchasing Italian Ansaldo planes or constructing planes in Klaipėda based on license from Albatros Flugzeugwerke. In 1925, Lithuania purchased eight Letov Š-20 fighters from Czechoslovakia. In 1926, he worked to enlarge and improve Aleksotas Airport. He visited Czechoslovakia, Latvia, Estonia to learn from their experience and organized an air show in September 1925. He also taught at the Higher Officers' Courses and wrote a textbook for aviators.

He supported Jurgis Dobkevičius and encouraged him to design and build monoplanes. He had a more contentious relationship with the aircraft designer Antanas Gustaitis. Despite the cold personal relationship, Kraucevičius recognized Gustaitis' talent and approved the construction of his first design ANBO I. Kraucevičius clashed with pilot Steponas Darius. Darius was selected by the General Staff to attend hydroplane courses in England. Kraucevičius wanted to send his nephew. When Darius travelled to Latvia for a football game and a hydroplane test flight, Kraucevičius had him arrested for five days for violating military discipline.

Many Lithuanian aviators were dissatisfied with Kraucevičius' leadership as he invited many Russian pilots (former comrades-in-arms) and appointed his cousin as aviation's treasurer. Several Lithuanian pilots resigned in protest and wrote numerous complaints to the General Staff. They complained that Kraucevičius created a "nest of Russian monarchists," disrespected Lithuanian officers, and did not keep up with advancements in aviation. There were rumors that he took a sizeable bribe when Lithuania purchased planes from Czechoslovakia. The Lithuanian Security Police started an investigation into Kraucevičius, but its outcome is not known. On 27 January 1927, President Antanas Smetona released Kraucevičius into the reserves.

=== World War II ===
Kraucevičius continued to maintain close contacts with high Lithuanian and foreign officials, including President Antanas Smetona, governor of Klaipėda and later prime minister Antanas Merkys, German representative to Lithuania Erich Zechlin. In 1927, Kraucevičius became a representative of Škoda. He arranged sales of machinery to the Lithuanian government and to various factories.

At the time of the Soviet occupation of Lithuania in June 1940, Kraucevičius worked to procure and install machinery for the Panevėžys Sugar Factory. He managed to get a permission from the NKVD for a business trip to Prague to supervise the delivery of machinery. He departed with his wife and daughter and decided to remain in Prague. In spring 1942, he returned to German-occupied Lithuania. German Gestapo attempted to recruit Kraucevičius to a committee that was to help Germans select people for forced labor in Germany but Kraucevičius refused.

As Red Army approached Lithuania, Kraucevičius again left for Prague. According to unverified testimony by Kraucevičius to the NKVD, he was arrested by the Germans in early 1944 and sent to a prisoner camp in Vienna. He was sent to work as a laborer at a factory, as a translator at a camp, and as a gardener in Chomutov. He was arrested by the Russians in May 1945 and sent to an NKVD filtration camp. He was held in various prisons until September 1945 when he was assigned to the 1st Reserve Division. He was released from the division in December 1945 and allowed to return to Lithuania.

=== Gulag detainee ===
Kraucevičius returned to Kaunas and found a job as an engineer-electrician, but he was arrested by the NKVD on 3 March 1946. He was interrogated until 5 August 1946. He was accused of participating in the White movement, for not returning from the business trip to Czechoslovakia in 1940 which amounted to treason, and for serving as a communications officer in the Lithuanian Auxiliary Police (this is not supported by known archival documents and was denied by Kraucevičius). On 20 August 1946, Kraucevičius was sentenced by the Military Tribunal of the Lithuanian NKVD to ten years in prison and five years of exile according to the Article 58 of the RSFSR Penal Code. His sentence also included confiscation of property, but it was inapplicable since he had no property. He unsuccessfully appealed the sentence to the Military Collegium of the Supreme Court of the Soviet Union.

Kraucevičius served his sentence in Karlag and later Pestchanlag in the Karaganda Region. In 1954, after the death of Stalin, Kraucevičius was released and returned to Lithuania. His health was failing yet he did not receive a pension and was forced to look for work. Due to his imprisonment, he could not find a skilled job and worked as a beekeeper and later as a watchman at the Kaunas Polytechnic Institute. He died on 4 March 1964 and was buried at the Petrašiūnai Cemetery.

== Residences ==
Kraucevičius built a villa in Aleksotas based on a 1926 project by architect Povilas Taračkovas. During the Soviet era, it was nationalized and turned into apartments. After Lithuania regained independence in 1990, it changed ownership several times and sat abandoned for a few years. In February 2021, it was demolished before it could be placed on the Lithuanian Registry of Cultural Heritage.

In 1936, Kraucevičius started the construction of a three-floor building at the center of Kaunas (architect Grigorijus Gumeniukas). The building had seven apartments. It is a modernist building. Its main façade is dominated by the vertical avant-corps which houses the main entrance and staircase.

== Awards ==
Kraucevičius received the following awards:

- Order of Saint Stanislaus (3rd class, 2nd class)
- Order of Saint Anna (4th class, 3rd class, 2nd class)
- Order of Saint Vladimir (4th class with swords and ribbon)
- Order of the Cross of Vytis (2nd type, 1st degree in 1922)
- Order of the White Lion (3rd degree with swords in 1926)
- Medal for the 10th Anniversary of the Liberation War (Latvia, 1929)

== Bibliography ==
- "House of General J. Kraucevicius". Architectuul.
- Girdenis, Povilas (22 November 2021). "Generolas leitenantas Juozas Kraucevičius". Sovietų represuoti Lietuvos kariuomenės generolai (in Lithuanian). Lietuvos ypatingasis archyvas.
- Gruzdienė, Estela (2000). "Pirmieji karo aviacijos vadai (1919–1934)". Darbai ir dienos (in Lithuanian). 21: 105–130. ISSN 2335-8769.
- Inytė, Vėjūnė (16 February 2021). "Paveldo sargai vėl ieško pasiteisinimų: Kaune su žeme sulyginta dar viena įspūdinga vila". Lietuvos rytas (in Lithuanian).
- Laurinaitis, Paulius Tautvydas (2014). "Juozo Kraucevičiaus gyvenamasis namas". Lietuvos tarpukario architektūra 1918–1939 m. (in Lithuanian). Architektūros ir urbanistikos tyrimų centras.
- "Naikintuvas – Letov Š.20L". Lietuvos sparnai (in Lithuanian). 1. 1995.
- Lukoševičius, Aistis (2019). Brigados generolas Antanas Gustaitis – Lietuvos karo aviacijos modernizatorius (PDF) (Master's thesis) (in Lithuanian). Kaunas: Vytautas Magnus University.
- Surgailis, Gintautas (1992). Lietuvos kariuomenės vadai (in Lithuanian). Vilnius: Mintis. ISBN 5-417-00513-4.
- Surgailis, Gintautas (2024). Dešimtasis pėstininkų Marijampolės pulkas (PDF) (in Lithuanian). Vilnius: Generolo Jono Žemaičio Lietuvos karo akademija. ISBN 978-609-8277-54-8.
- Tamašauskas, Kazimieras (8 September 2023) [2018]. "Juozas Kraucevičius". Visuotinė lietuvių enciklopedija (in Lithuanian). Mokslo ir enciklopedijų leidybos centras.
- Žalienė, Dalia, ed. (2004). Lietuvos kariuomenės karininkai 1918–1953 (in Lithuanian). Vol. IV. Vilnius: Lietuvos nacionalinis muziejus. ISBN 9955-415-38-X.
- Zemlickas, Gediminas (4–17 May 2000). "Gimęs iš poreikio nenusileisti (2). Lietuvos karo lakūnui ir pirmajam aviakonstruktoriui Jurgiui Dobkevičiui – 100". Mokslo Lietuva (in Lithuanian). 9 (211).
