= Juozas Papečkys =

Lithuanian military officer

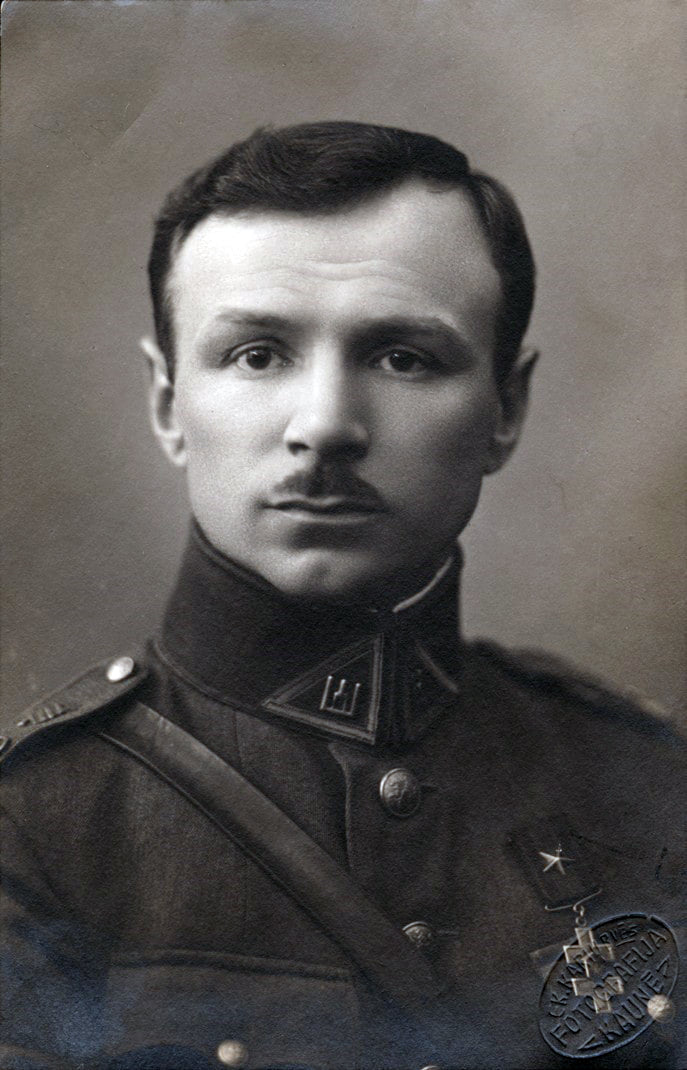
- Juozas Papečkys in military uniform

Minister of Defence
- In office 15 June 1926 – 18 December 1926
- Prime Minister: Mykolas Sleževičius
- Preceded by: Leonas Bistras
- Succeeded by: Antanas Merkys

Personal details
- Born: 1 January 1890 Puskepuriai, Suwalki Governorate, Congress Poland
- Died: 4 November 1942 (aged 52) Yekaterinburg (Sverdlovsk), Soviet Union
- Cause of death: Execution by the NKVD
- Spouse: Teklė Vaitiekaitytė
- Children: 2
- Education: Imperial Moscow University
- Occupation: Military officer, lawyer

Military service
- Allegiance: Russian Empire; Lithuania
- Years of service: 1916–1917, 1919–1927
- Rank: Lieutenant colonel

Juozas Papečkys (1 January 1890 – 4 November 1942) was a Lithuanian lawyer and military officer. He served as a vice-minister of defense (1922–1926), the Minister of Defense of Lithuania (June–December 1926), and a member of the State Council of Lithuania (1929–1940).

As a high school student, Papečkys was imprisoned by the Tsarist police for publishing an illegal newspaper Mokinių draugas. After he graduated from law studies at the Imperial Moscow University, he was mobilized into the Russian Imperial Army. In 1919, he returned to Lithuania and joined the Lithuanian Army where he was assigned to the military court. Papečkys was the prosecutor in the trial of the 117 members of the Polish Military Organisation who organized a coup against the Lithuanian government. In February 1922, Papečkys became vice-minister in the Lithuanian Ministry of Defence. In June 1926, he became the Minister of Defence in the government of Mykolas Sleževičius and drafted plans for military reforms. However, the government was overthrown in the coup d'état of December 1926. Soon after, Papečkys also retired from the military. He returned to government service in 1929 when he became a member of the State Council of Lithuania.

Papečkys was deported to the Sverdlovsk Oblast during the June deportation in 1941. He was executed on 4 November 1942 and likely buried in a mass grave outside of Sverdlovsk (now Yekaterinburg).

== Biography ==
=== Early life ===
Juozas Papečkys was born on 1 January 1890 in the Puskepuriai village of the Suwalki Governorate to a peasant family. Because he was born on the night of the new year, some documents note his birth year as 1889. Papečkys was the oldest of eight brothers and three sisters. As was customary in rural Lithuanian society, the eldest son was to be sent off to a priest seminary. However, at the age of 15, Papečkys refused to become a priest. As a result, Papečkys was expelled from his home.

=== Education ===
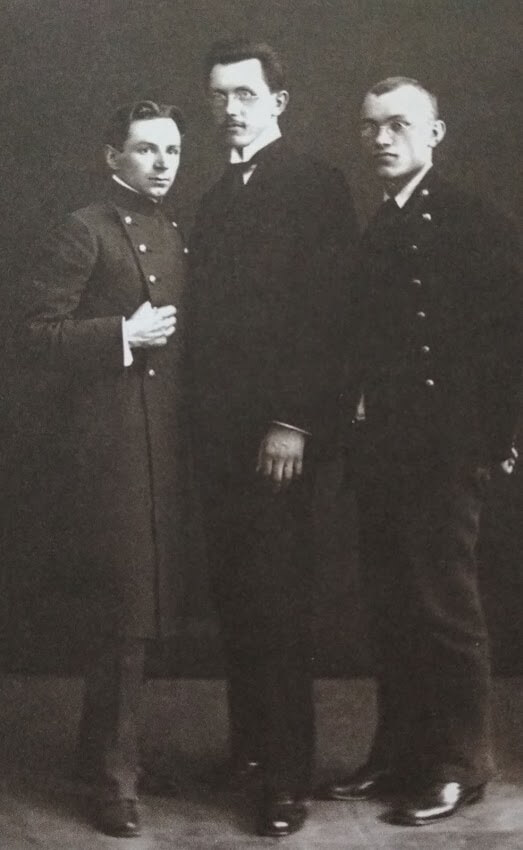
Juozas Papečkys (left) in Moscow, c. 1913

Papečkys managed to get admitted to the Marijampolė Gymnasium, where he joined the Lithuanian National Revival. Papečkys noted in his autobiography that since the third grade, he participated in the distribution of illegal books and patriotic proclamations, and organized village youth and schoolchildren, preparing lectures and performances for them. In 1908, Papečkys began contributing articles to Vilniaus žinios, Lietuvos ūkininkas, and other Lithuanians newspapers. Together with Petras Klimas and others, he also published a secret newspaper Mokinių draugas (Friend of the Students). As a result, the Tsarist police arrested the students, expelled them from the school, and jailed them in Kalvarija for about six months.

Their trial took place in summer 1909. Due to the efforts of the State Duma representative and lawyer Andrius Bulota, they were acquitted and allowed to return to the gymnasium. After graduating in 1910, Papečkys continued his studies at the faculty of law of the Imperial Moscow University. He continued to be active in Lithuanian cultural and social life. In fall 1909, he once again was arrested for two weeks for participating in a student protest. In 1910–1911, he assisted in editing the youth magazine Aušrinė. In 1916, he graduated from the university and received a law diploma. In addition to Russian and Lithuanian, Papečkys knew the Polish, German, French, Italian, and Latvian languages.

=== World War I and the Russian Civil War ===
In 1916, Papečkys was mobilized into the Russian Imperial Army as a private and assigned to the 57th Reserve Infantry Regiment in Tver. He was then sent to the Moscow Alekseevsky Military School. Upon graduation, he received the rank of praporshchik and was assigned to the 85th Reserve Infantry Regiment in Moscow. He served in the regiment until the October Revolution of 1917. A collection of his poems under the pseudonym Juozas Rainis was published in Boston (United States) in 1917. He published more poems in an anthology dedicated to Vincas Kudirka in 1924.

In 1918, Papečkys moved to Pyatigorsk in the northern Caucasus where he joined a committee, organized by Juozas Avižonis, that provided aid to the Lithuanians war refugees. When Pyatigorsk became the capital of the Terek Soviet Republic, Avižonis and Papečkys organized a commissariat for Lithuanian refugees. In early 1919, he was mobilized into the Volunteer Army commanded by Anton Denikin. However, he went into hiding and avoided the mobilization. In summer 1919, Papečkys organized a group of 40 Lithuanian refugees and their journey from Pyatigorsk to Lithuania.

=== Independent Lithuania ===
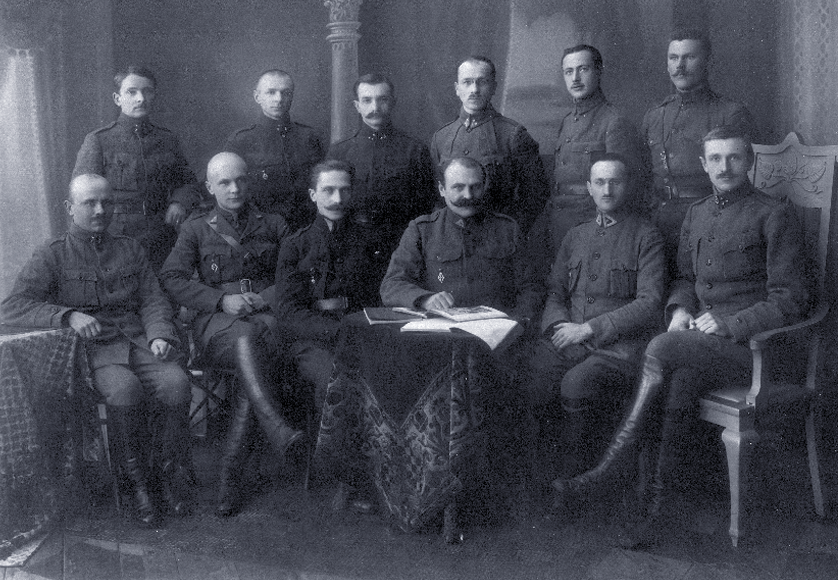
Lithuanian Military Court, 1919, Kaunas. Papečkys is standing second from left

On 20 October 1919, Papečkys was mobilized into the Lithuanian Army. On 18 November 1919, Papečkys was promoted to lieutenant and then to senior lieutenant two weeks later. As he had legal education, he was assigned to the Lithuanian military court as deputy prosecutor. Due to the martial law in effect in Lithuania, the military court also handled criminal and civil cases. Papečkys gained recognition after prosecuting 117 members of the Polish Military Organisation who organized a coup against the Lithuanian government. For his efforts, Papečkys was awarded the Order of the Cross of Vytis (2nd type, 3rd degree) on 14 July 1921.

On 25 August 1921, Papečkys became the judicial consultant of the Lithuanian Ministry of Defence. On 20 February 1922, he became the vice-minister and continued to work in this role until early 1926. He translated, edited, and adapted a collection of Russian military statutes into Lithuanian (mainly based on the Code of Military Regulations of 1869). Although it was an unofficial publication, it was sorely needed for the normal functioning of the military court system in Lithuania. On 1 January 1924, he became the head of the newly established Economic and Financial Department of the Ministry of Defence. This department was in charge of the procurement and budget of the ministry.

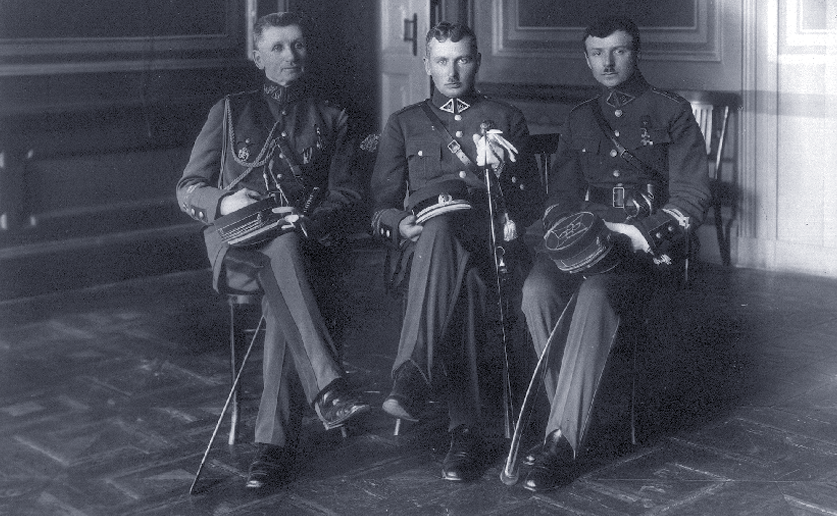
Silvestras Žukauskas, Balys Sližys, and Juozas Pepečkys in 1924, Kaunas

In addition to his work at the ministry, Papečkys participated in the Klaipėda Revolt. He was also one of the founders of the Lithuanian Riflemen's Union. He also lectured at the War School of Kaunas and Higher Officers' Courses (1921–1926), contributed articles to various newspapers, and was chairman of the Lithuanian Military Studies Society (1925–1926). Later, he was an active member of the Union for the Liberation of Vilnius, frequent contributor to its magazine Mūsų Vilnius, and author of a separate booklet Vilniaus problemos esmė (1937; The Essence of the Vilnius Problem).

After the Lithuanian Seimas elections of May 1926, Papečkys became the Minister of Defence in the government of Mykolas Sleževičius on 16 June. While he sympathized with the Lithuanian Popular Peasants' Union, he was not a member of any political party. He worked on a plan to reorganize the military, reduce military spending by reducing administrative and supporting personnel, and improve military education. Military officers criticized Papečkys for weakening the military and thus threatening Lithuania's independence. In particular, Papečkys came into conflict with generals Kazys Ladiga (who was demoted from the Chief of the General Staff) and Vincas Grigaliūnas-Glovackis (who was retired from the military). Papečkys was briefly arrested on the night of the 1926 Lithuanian coup d'état to prevent him for organizing resistance. The coup replaced Šleževičius with Augustinas Voldemaras. On 20 December, Papečkys submitted a request to retire from active military service but it was granted only on 16 February 1927. While his request was pending, he returned to the military court.

Papečkys worked as a private lawyer until January 1929, when he became a member of the State Council of Lithuania, eventually becoming its deputy chairman in August 1938. At the State Council, Papečkys worked on drafting the law on amnesty and the criminal code. When the State Council was liquidated after the Soviet occupation of Lithuania in June 1940, Papečkys obtained a job as a consultant at the People's Commissariat of Justice.

=== Soviet persecution ===
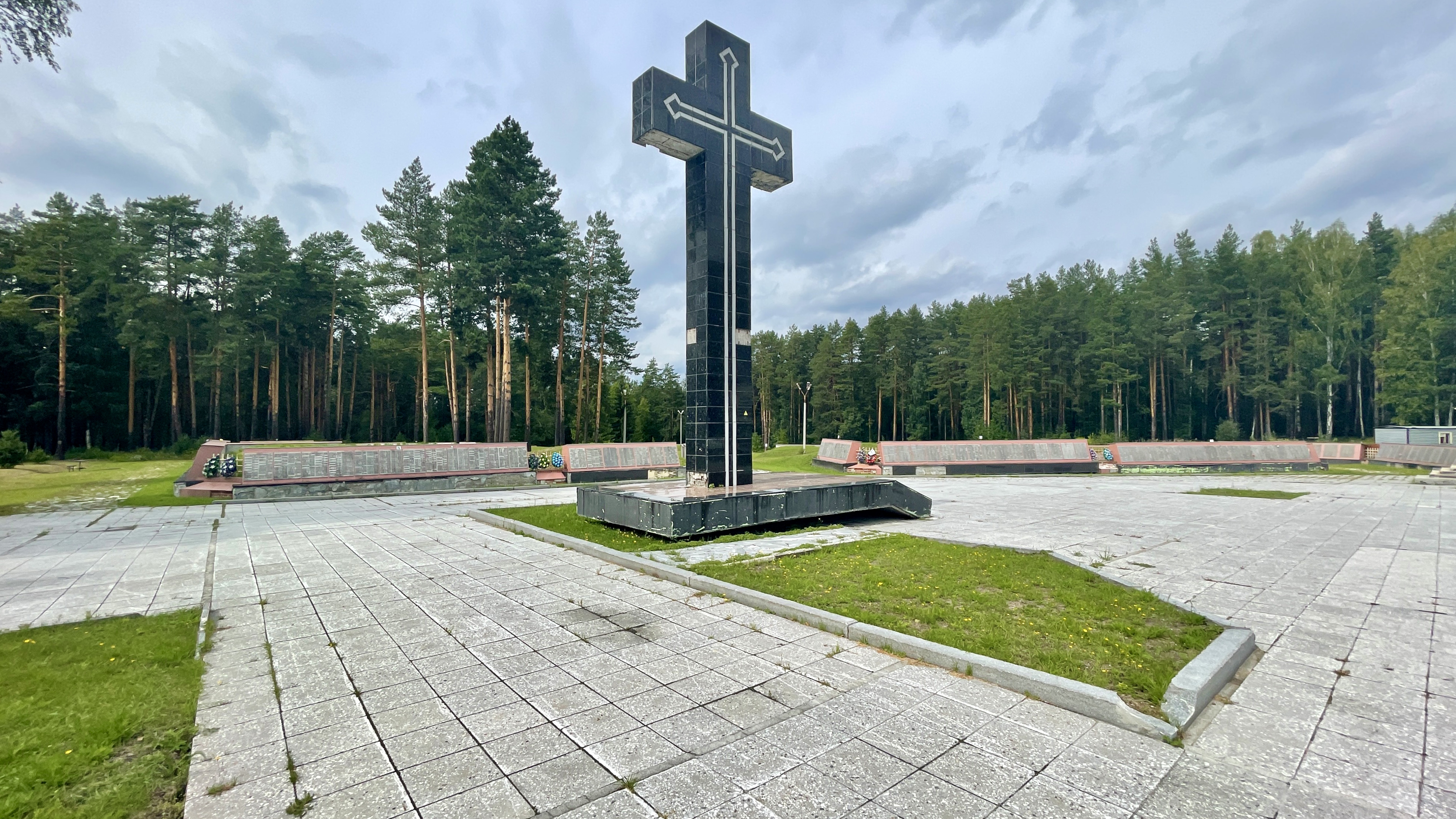
Memorial cross at the mass burial site

On 14 June 1941, during the June deportation, Papečkys and his family were arrested by the Soviet authorities. Papečkys was separated from his family at the Kaunas railway station. Papečkys was transported via Starobelsk to a gulag camp near Sosva in the Sverdlovsk Oblast (part of Sevurallag). About 800 men were taken to that camp, including about 250 Lithuanians (seven of which were former government ministers). Due to hunger and inhumane conditions, about a third of the Lithuanians died during the first winter. Others were interrogated and sentenced to death or various prison sentences by the Special Council of the NKVD according to the Article 58 (RSFSR Penal Code). Papečkys was sentenced to 10 years in prison.

However, NKVD accused 15 Lithuanians (including Papečkys and Voldemaras Vytautas Čarneckis) of organizing a "counter-revolutionary" group that prepared for an armed mutiny inside the gulag. Of this group of prisoners, only Papečkys refused to plead guilty. On 4 November 1942, Papečkys and Čarneckis were shot in an NKVD prison in Sverdlovsk (now Yekaterinburg). They were likely buried in a mass grave at the 12 kilometre marker on the highway to Moscow. In 1990s, the Memorial to the Victims of Political Repression was built at the site with more than 18,000 names of people buried there. However, Papečkys' name is not one of them.

== Military ranks ==
Papečkys was promoted to the following ranks in the Lithuanian Army:

- 18 November 1919: lieutenant
- 30 November 1919: senior lieutenant
- 28 April 1920: captain
- 1 September 1922: major
- 16 February 1926: lieutenant colonel

== Awards ==
Papečkys received the following awards:

- 1921: Order of the Cross of Vytis (2nd type, 3rd degree)
- 1926: Order of the White Lion (military, 3rd class)
- 1928: Order of Gediminas (3rd degree)
- 1928: Lithuanian Medal of Independence
- 1934: Order of Vytautas the Great (2nd degree)

== Personal life ==
In 1923, Papečkys married Teklė Vaitiekaitytė, whom he met in Moscow during World War I. Their wedding was officiated by Juozas Tumas-Vaižgantas. Papečkys had two daughters – Ona Daina (born 1924) and Jūra Marija (born 1925).

In 1930–1935, Papečkys built a house in Kaunas designed by the architect Vytautas Landsbergis-Žemkalnis. In 2013, a memorial plaque was affixed to this house.

Papečkys's wife and daughters were deported to the Altai Krai. In summer 1942, they were transferred to Muostakh near Bykovsky on the shores of the Laptev Sea. Teklė, not having learned of her husband's fate, died in 1953 in Yakutsk, while their two daughters successfully returned to Lithuania in 1957.

== Bibliography ==
- Abromavičius, Stanislovas (28 June 2013). "Gyvenimo išbandymai" (PDF). Tremtinys (in Lithuanian). 24 (1046).
- Ažubalis, Algirdas (2007). "Jie kūrė karo pedagogiką Lietuvoje". In Ažubalis, Algirdas (ed.). Karo pedagogika lietuvoje (1918–1940 m.) (in Lithuanian). Vilnius: Generolo Jono Žemaičio Lietuvos karo akademija. ISBN 978-9955-423-58-4.
- Čiplytė, Joana Viga (4 January 2021). "Pulkininkas leitenantas Juozas Papečkys". viga.lt (in Lithuanian).
- Javaitytė, Skirmantė (15 June 2019). "Tarpukario šaulio anūkė D. Kemeraitienė: iš jų galime pasimokyti pagarbos ir meilės tėvynei" (in Lithuanian).
- Kulnytė, Birutė, ed. (2006). Lietuvos kariuomenės karininkai 1918–1953 (in Lithuanian). Vol. VI. Vilnius: Lietuvos nacionalinis muziejus. ISBN 978-9955-415-67-1.
- Kuodys, Modestas (2008). "Juozas Papečkys". In Surgailis, Gintautas (ed.). Lietuvos krašto apsaugos ministrai ir kariuomenės vadai (in Lithuanian). Vol. II. Lietuvos Respublikos krašto apsaugos ministerija. ISBN 978-9986-738-98-5.
- Maksimaitis, Mindaugas (2006). Valstybės taryba Lietuvos teisinėje sistemoje (1928–1940) (in Lithuanian). Justitia. ISBN 9955-616-22-9.
- Lukminaitė, Solveiga (2017). "Lietuvos kariuomenės karininkas Juozas Papečkys" (PDF). Vytauto Didžiojo karo muziejus (in Lithuanian): 247–263. ISSN 2029-3259.
- Žygelis, Dalius; Tekorius, Andrius (2014). "Plk. ltn. Juozas Papečkys: Lietuvos karo teisės patriarchas" (PDF). Kardas (in Lithuanian). 2 (462): 2–9. ISSN 1392-9437.
