= Stasys Pundzevičius =

Lithuanian division general and lecturer

Division general Stasys Pundzevičius
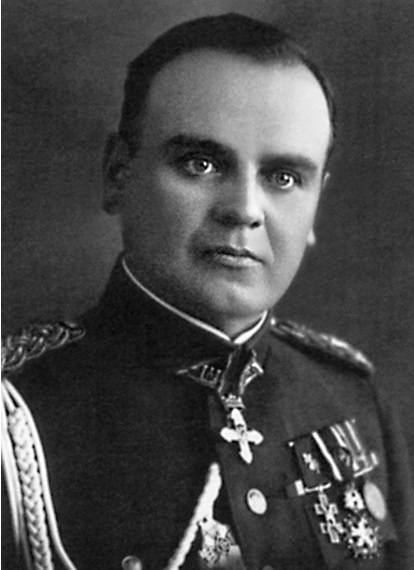
- Pundzevičius photographed with uniform of the Lithuanian Army and state awards
- Born: 2 September 1893; Laibiškiai, Russian Empire
- Died: 20 October 1980 (aged 87); Great Neck, New York, United States
- Burial place: St. Charles Cemetery in Long Island
- Alma mater: Kyiv Institute of Commerce (1914), Orenburg School of Praporshchiks, Higher Officers' Courses (1922), Academy of the General Staff of Prague (1925)
- Military career
- Allegiance: Imperial Russian Army (1916–1917); Lithuanian Armed Forces (1919–1940); Lithuanian People's Army (1940); Red Army (1940); Lithuanian Activist Front (1941)
- Service years: 1916–1941
- Rank: Division general
- Other work: Lecturer, teacher

Stasys Pundzevičius (2 September 1893 – 20 October 1980) was a Lithuanian division general and lecturer. He held high-ranking military positions in the interwar Lithuania: Chief of the Lithuanian Air Force, Chief of the General Staff, multiple times temporarily was the Chief of the Lithuanian Armed Forces, and was assigned Chief of the Lithuanian Armed Forces by the Provisional Government of Lithuania during the June Uprising in Lithuania.

== Early life ==
Pundzevičius was born on 2 September 1893 in Laibiškiai near Skapiškis, then part of the Russian Empire. In 1913, he graduated from the Panevėžys Real School and since 1914 studied at the Kyiv Institute of Commerce. In 1915, he worked as a clerk for the Union of the All-Russian Land in Smolensk.

In 1916, Pundzevičius was mobilized into the Imperial Russian Army and after graduating from the Orenburg School for Praporshchiks he fought in the Northern Front of the World War I. In 1918, he was taken prisoner by the Germans and upon being released he returned to Lithuania.

== Interwar Lithuania ==
Following his return to Lithuania, Pundzevičius was mobilized into the Lithuanian Armed Forces on 4 July 1919 and was appointed adjutant of the First Division Headquarters.

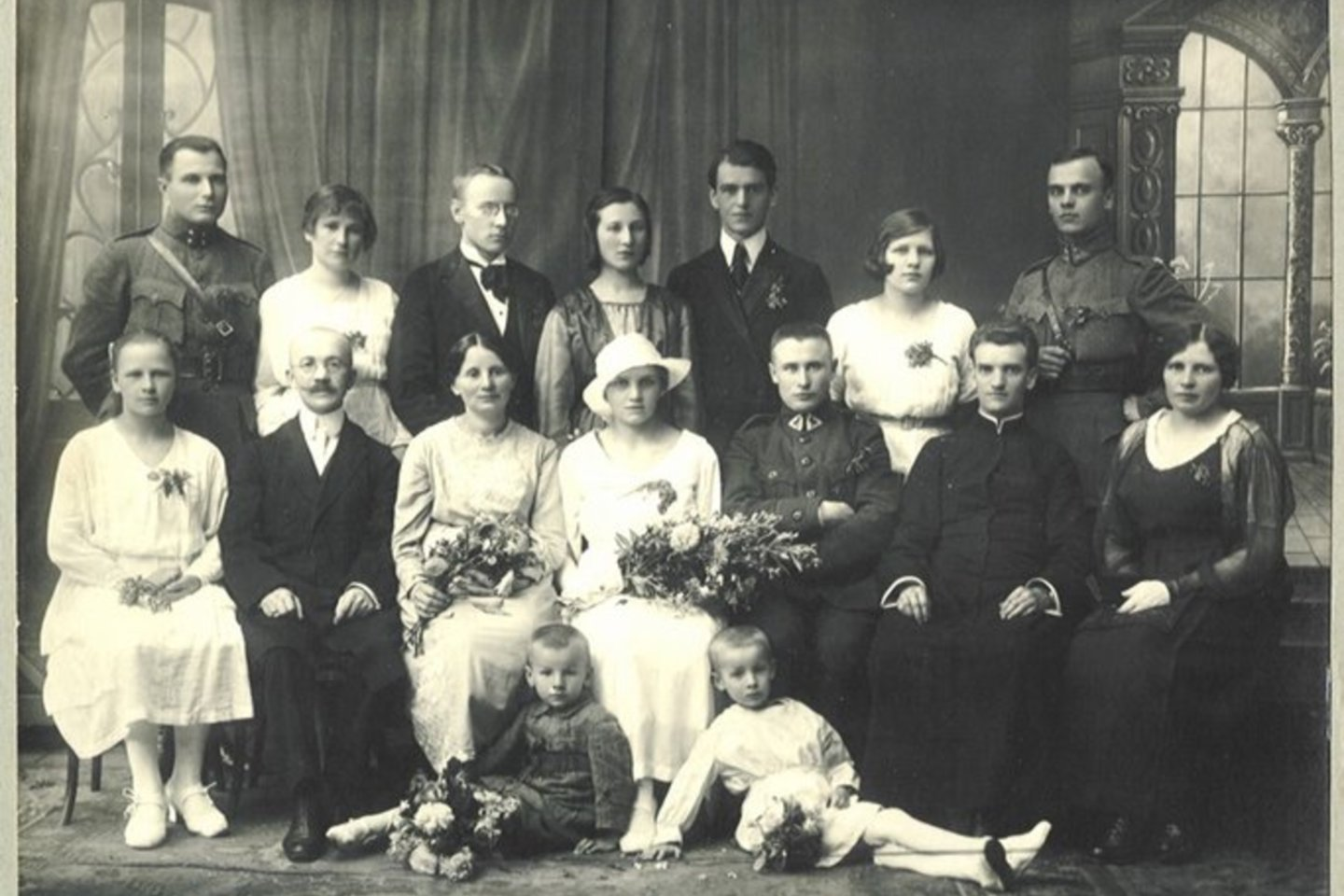
Pundzevičius (third line, first from the right) attending the wedding of Kazys Ladiga on 12 September 1920

In 1919–20, he participated in the Lithuanian Wars of Independence with the Russian SFSR, the West Russian Volunteer Army, and the Polish Armed Forces. In 1920, Pundzevičius participated in the preparation of the battle plan for the Battle of Giedraičiai (with Juozas Lanskoronskis).

1921, Pundzevičius was appointed Chief of Staff of the Fourth Infantry Regiment in Alytus, and on 25 June 1921 he was promoted to the military rank of captain.

In 1922, Pundzevičius graduated from the Higher Officers' Courses and was appointed Chief of the Third (Operations) Division of the General Staff.

In 1923, Pundzevičius participated in the Klaipėda Revolt. The same year Pundzevičius married Teofilija Ona Chmieliauskaitė, who on 1928 gave birth to their son Rimantas Kazimieras Pundzevičius.

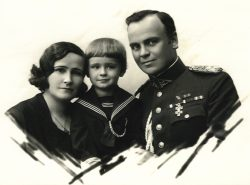
Pundzevičius with his wife and son

On 1 November 1923, Pundzevičius was sent to studies at the Academy of the General Staff of Prague. Upon graduating it in 1925, he was granted rights of an officer of the General Staff and was appointed commander of the Fifth Infantry Regiment. On 16 February 1926, he was promoted to the military rank of lieutenant colonel of the General Staff.

In 1926–27, Pundzevičius lectured at the War School of Kaunas. In 1926, he published his book Pėstininkų taktika (English: Infantry Tactics).

On 12 March 1927, Pundzevičius was appointed Chief of the Lithuanian Air Force, and on 1 May 1927 he was elected member of the Board of the Lithuanian Aeroclub. Pundzevičius was one of the founders of the Lithuanian Aeroclub.

On 23 November 1929, Pundzevičius was promoted to the military rank of colonel of the General Staff.

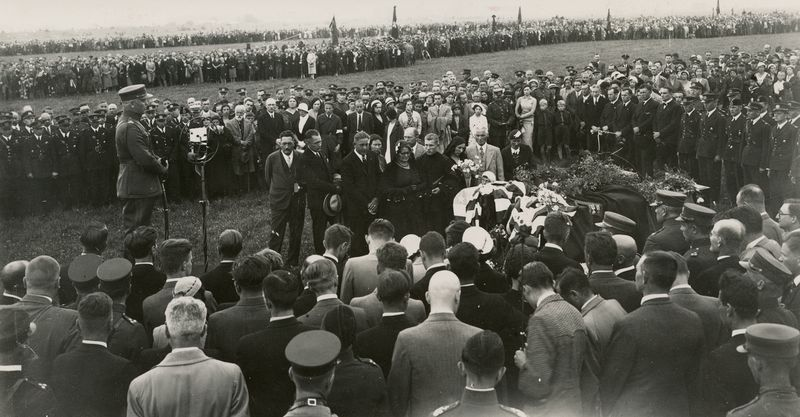
Pundzevičius gives a speech at the funeral of Steponas Darius and Stasys Girėnas, following their transatlantic flight with Lituanica, in 1933

On 1 May 1934, Pundzevičius was appointed commander of the Second Infantry Division and Chief of the Kaunas' Garrison. He lectured military tactics at the Higher Officers' Courses and War School of Kaunas. On 13 July 1934, he was transferred to the Third Infantry Division in Šiauliai as Chief of Staff.

On 19 August 1935, Pundzevičius was appointed commander of the First Infantry Division and Chief of the Panevėžys' Garrison. On 22 November 1935, he was promoted to the military rank of lieutenant general (following the military ranks reform of 28 December 1936 – brigadier general).

On 23 November 1938, Pundzevičius was promoted to the military rank of division general. On 4 April 1939, he was appointed Chief of the General Staff, and multiple times temporarily served as Commander-in-Chief of the Lithuanian Armed Forces.

On 22 March 1939, when the Chief of the Staff of the Lithuanian Armed Forces Jonas Černius took over the command of the Government of Lithuania, Pundzevičius was appointed Chief of Staff of the Lithuanian Armed Forces by the order of the Commander of the Lithuanian Armed Forces Stasys Raštikis. He was the 22nd and the last Chief of Staff of independent Lithuania's armed forces.

In 1940, when Raštikis left the position of the Commander of the Lithuanian Armed Forces there were two candidates for this position: generals Mikas Rėklaitis and Pundzevičius. However, then general Vincas Vitkauskas became the Commander of the Lithuanian Armed Forces and Pundzevičius became Chief of Staff of the Lithuanian Armed Forces. It is unknown why Pundzevičius refused to become the Commander of the Lithuanian Armed Forces and gave up this position to Vitkauskas, who turned out to be pro-Soviet.

On 1–2 October 1939, only one matter was discussed at the meeting of the Government of Lithuania – the demobilization of the Lithuanian Armed Forces. Generals Raštikis and Pundzevičius did not participate in this meeting. It is likely that this happened because the tautininkai in power did not trust the officers. Following this meeting, the Soviet–Lithuanian Mutual Assistance Treaty was accepted and the military bases of the Red Army were established in Lithuania in exchange for the Lithuanian capital Vilnius. On 23 October 1939, Pundzevičius and some other high-ranking officers of the Lithuanian Armed Forces met the Soviet military delegation. In this way, the Red Army was met without any resistance.

On 15 June 1940, less than a few hours after the last meeting of the government, the Commander of the Lithuanian Armed Forces Vitkauskas issued the following order: "Brigadier general Kazys Musteikis has withdrawn. The position of the Minister of National Defense, as assigned by the President of the Republic, since 15 June will temporarily be led by me". This order of Vitkauskas was also signed by Pundzevičius. Then the Chief of Staff of the Lithuanian Armed Forces Pundzevičius issued an order that the Ninth Infantry Regiment must depart to help President Antanas Smetona to return. As it is now known, Pundzevičius did everything not of his own free will, but followed the instructions of the Government of Lithuania.

== Occupations and World War II ==
"The new commander of the army, General Feliksas Baltušis-Žemaitis, who was sent from Russia, and the chief political leader, Jonas Macijauskas, began to work on the Bolshevization and disorganization of the army. There was no end to the rallies in the army... In order to suppress the national sentiment of the army, the political leadership of the army, through the army commander, demanded that the singing of the Lithuanian national anthem be banned and national flags be removed. Officers were fired from the army only by the orders of the political leadership. The officers were fired individually and in separate groups according to pre-prepared lists. Any intercession or protest had no meaning. On the contrary, intercession accelerated dismissal and often even arrest.
For example, when Colonel Konstantinas Dulksnys, the Chief of the 2nd Division of the General Staff, was dismissed, major Korotkikh, a Soviet military attaché, arrived at the Army Headquarters and demanded that Major Parelis be appointed to replace the dismissed Colonel Dulksnys. When I was surprised by this requirement and stated that the appointment of staff officers was within my competence, the military attaché strongly emphasized that this requirement of the Soviet mission would have to be met and that I myself was responsible for fulfilling that requirement."

— Chief of Staff of the Lithuanian Armed Forces Stasys Pundzevičius about the first days of the Soviet occupation of Lithuania in June 1940.

Following the Soviet occupation of Lithuania in June 1940, Pundzevičius served as Chief of Staff of the Lithuanian People's Army. On 2 September 1940, he was appointed commander of the 179th Rifle Division of the 29th Rifle Corps of the Red Army, however on 11 December 1940 the order was cancelled and he was fired from the armed forces. Political inaction was given as the reason for firing by the political commissar of the 29th Rifle Corps. Soon the arrests of high-ranking Lithuanian officers began and Colonel Antanas Gustaitis, the Chief of Staff of the 179th Division, was the first to be arrested. Pundzevičius, who did not voluntarily resign from military service, was looking for a job everywhere, but none wanted to accept him. Security agents regularly visited Pundzevičius' home. Later Pundzevičius learned from his close friends that the preparations are taking place to arrest him, thus he hid.

Pundzevičius actively participated in the underground activities of the Lithuanian Activist Front (LAF). Following the start of the Soviet–German War in 1941, he was one of the organizers and managers of the June Uprising in Lithuania. One 24 June 1941, the National Defense Council was formed, which included div. gen. Stasys Pundzevičius, div. gen. Mikas Rėklaitis, Col. Juozas Vėbra, Kaunas Military Commandant Col. Jurgis Bobelis and Kaunas Burgomaster Kazimieras Palčiauskas. The members of the council were soldiers who held high positions in the army of independent Lithuania. On the same 24 June 1941, Pundzevičius was appointed Chief of the Lithuanian Armed Forces by the Provisional Government of Lithuania. He together with Stasys Raštikis advised Algirdas Klimaitis to disappear from Kaunas and not to participate in pogrom, however Klimaitis tried to excuse that he is being forced and was threatened by the German Security Police that if he refused to do so he would face punishment – execution by firing squad. On 15 September 1941, he together with other representatives of the LAF (e.g. Vladas Nagevičius) signed a memorandum Apie Lietuvos būklę pradėjus veikti vokiečių civilinei valdžiai Lietuvoje (English: About the state of Lithuania after the beginning of the German civilian government in Lithuania). Following it, he worked as a teacher in Kaunas until 1944. During the German occupation of Lithuania, Pundzevičius was an active member of the Lithuanian anti-Nazi resistance and contributed to preventing the Germans from establishing a Lithuanian Legion of the Waffen-SS.

== Emigration ==
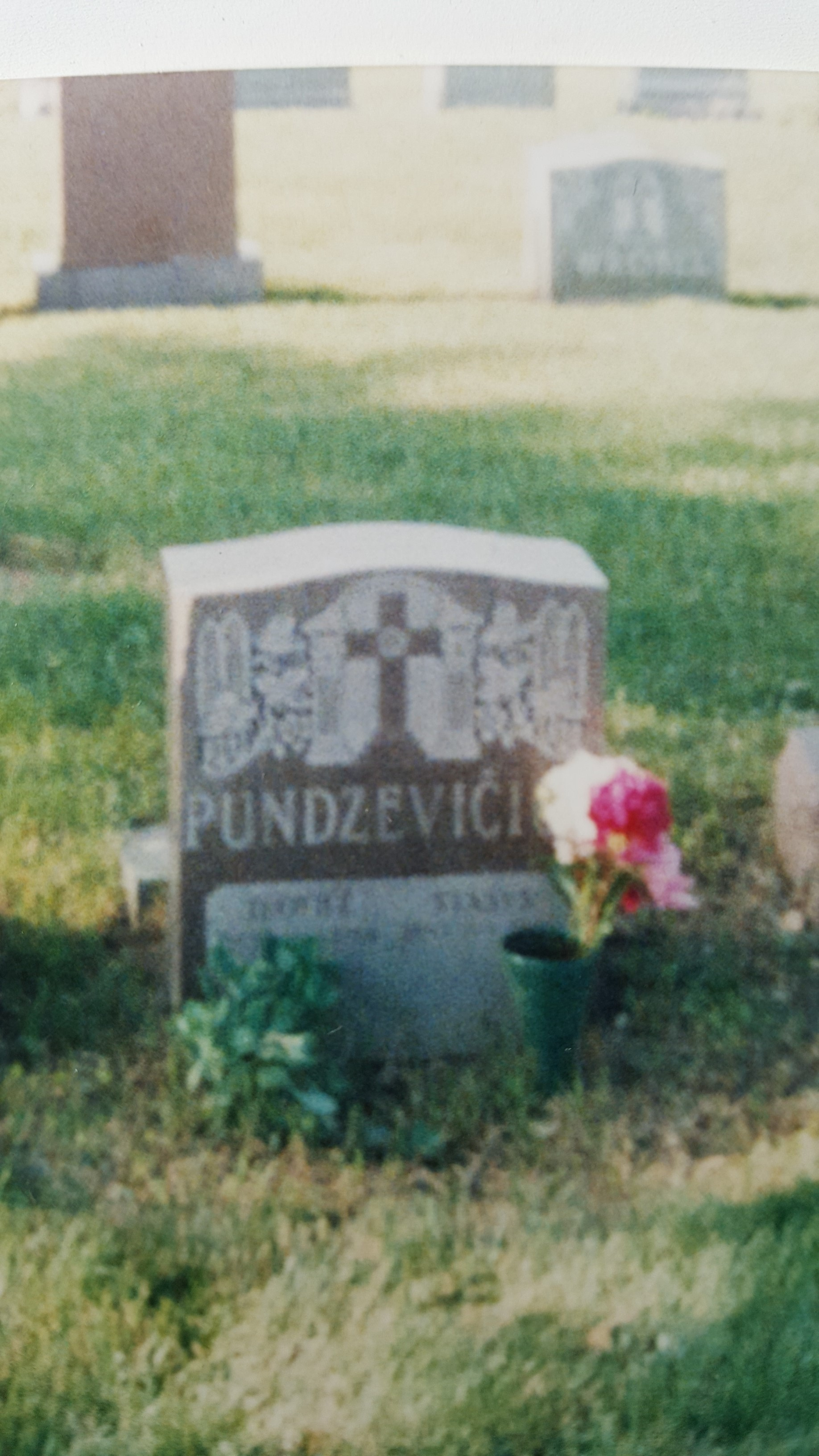
Pundzevičius' grave

In 1944, Pundzevičius departed to Germany, and in 1949 he emigrated to the United States. He lived in Great Neck, New York, and worked as a gardener.

Pundzevičius died on 20 October 1980 and was buried at St. Charles Cemetery in Long Island, State of New York. His wife, Teofile (1900–1966), died before him.

== Awards ==
Pundzevičius was awarded the following medals and orders:

- Knight's Cross of the Order of the Cross of Vytis (1925)
- Medal of Independence of Lithuania (1928)
- Commander's Cross of the Order of the Lithuanian Grand Duke Gediminas (1928)
- Commander's Cross of the Order of Vytautas the Great (1933)
- Star of the Riflemen (1937)
- Silver medal of Klaipėda Revolt (1934)
- Commander's Cross of the Order of the Crown of Italy (1930)
- Officer's Order of the White Lion (1927)
- Commander's Order of the Three Stars (3rd class, 15 November 1935)
- Latvian Liberation War 10th Anniversary Participants Medal (1929)
- Cross of Merit of the Aizsargi (1939)
