= Military school of Kaunas =

Military school of Kaunas might refer to one the educational institutions in Kaunas, Lithuania:

- War School of Kaunas (1919–1940) for junior officers
- Higher Officers' Courses (1921–1940) for senior officers
