= Konstantinas Kleščinskis =

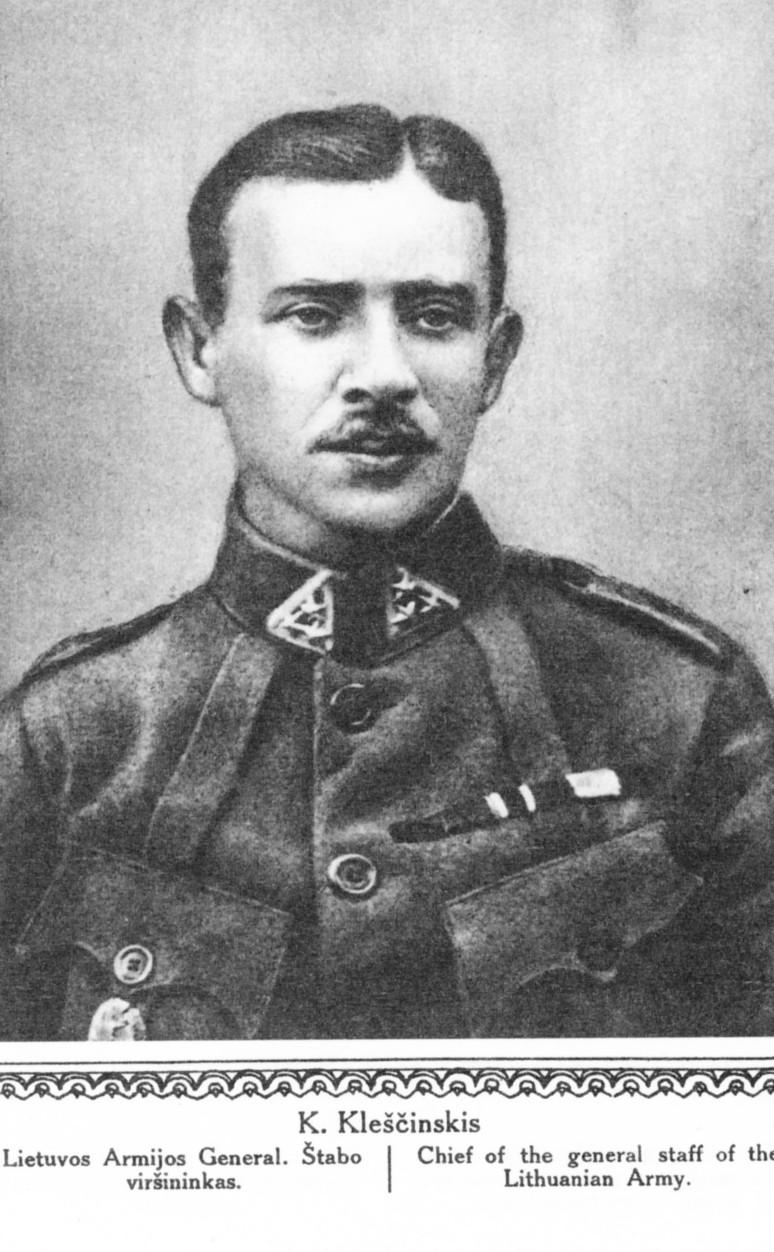
- Kleščinskis in Lithuania Album (1920)
- Born: 1 May 1879; Elisabethpol, Russian Empire
- Died: 1 June 1927 (aged 48); Kaunas, Lithuania
- Military career
- Allegiance: Russian Empire; Poland; Lithuania
- Branch: Imperial Russian Army; Polish Army; Lithuanian Armed Forces
- Service years: 1899–1923
- Rank: Lieutenant general
- Commands: Chief of the General Staff of the Lithuanian Army
- Conflicts: Russo-Japanese War; World War I Lithuanian Wars of Independence

Konstantinas Kleščinskis (Russian: Константин Карлович Клещинский, Polish: Konstanty Kleszczyński; 1879–1927) was a military officer who served in the Imperial Russian Army, Polish Army and Lithuanian Armed Forces. A graduate of the Nicholas General Staff Academy, he fought in the Russo-Japanese War and World War I. He was taken prisoner by the Germans after the fall of Novogeorgievsk in August 1915. After his release, he briefly served in the Polish Army before joining the Lithuanian Army in May 1919. He fought in the Lithuanian–Soviet War and was the Chief of the General Staff of the Lithuanian Army from August 1920 to April 1921. After retirement from active duty, he was recruited by the NKVD to spy for the Soviet Union. He was found guilty of espionage and executed by Lithuania on 1 June 1927.

== Biography ==
=== Russian Imperial Army ===
Kleščinskis was born in Elisabethpol (now Ganja, Azerbaijan) into a family of Lithuanian roots. He studied at the St. Petersburg University but quit after one semester and joined the Imperial Russian Army in August 1899. In 1901, he graduated from the Alexander Military School in Moscow and was assigned to the Volhynian Life Guards Regiment and later to the 34th Siberian Rifle Regiment. He fought in the Russo-Japanese War. From 1906 to 1910, he studied at the Nicholas General Staff Academy. He was promoted to captain in 1909. After graduation, he served in the Finnish Life Guards Regiment until October 1912 when he was assigned to the headquarters of the Amur Military District. For a year, he served in the Vladivostok Fortress. During World War I, he served in the headquarters of the 4th Siberian Army Corps and 34th Army Corps. In August 1915, he became Chief of Staff of the 114th Infantry Division but a few days later was captured with the division by the Germans after the fall of Novogeorgievsk.

=== Polish Army ===
Kleščinskis joined the Polish General Staff in December 1918. However, he was dissatisfied with the offered post and decided to join the anti-communist Northwestern Army commanded by Nikolai Yudenich.

=== Lithuanian Army ===
In May 1919, on his way to Helsinki, he stopped in Kaunas where Antanas Merkys, Minister of Defence of Lithuania, offered him a position in the Lithuanian Army which sorely lacked experienced officers. At the time, he was the only officer who had graduated from a staff college or had experience serving in a general staff. He joined the army as an instructor and fought in the Lithuanian–Soviet War. In November 1919, he joined the Lithuanian General Staff and had several roles (deputy to the Chief of the General Staff, acting Chief of the General Staff, quartermaster general) before serving as the Chief of the General Staff from 23 August 1920 to 13 April 1921. In February 1920, he participated in suppressing the Kaunas garrison mutiny. During 1920, he was a member of the Lithuanian delegation negotiating the Soviet–Lithuanian Peace Treaty. From July 1921, he was the commander of the 2nd Infantry Division. At the same time, he taught topography and tactics at courses of Kaunas Military Hospital and Higher Officers' Courses. On 6 January 1922, he was promoted to lieutenant general.

=== Retirement and espionage ===
Kleščinskis retired from active duty on 8 August 1923. During a party he made some comments against the government of President Aleksandras Stulginskis and that this government will be soon overthrown by a dictator.

He received Lithuanian citizenship, 12 hectares (30 acres) of land near Kaunas, and a pension. He worked as a director of a cement plant in Šiauliai and established a company that planned to import wine from France to Russia. In 1924, while visiting Moscow, he was recruited by the Soviets and became an agent of the NKVD (codename Ivanov 12). He was promised a monthly sum of 500 Lithuanian litas and help to his family members who lived in Russia. His wife died in 1925 leaving their 10-year-old son in care of Kleščinskis' mother and aunt who lived in poverty. On 11 May 1927, Kleščinskis asked to rejoin the Lithuanian Army but was refused. Lithuanian counterintelligence, commanded by Jonas Budrys, followed Kleščinskis and caught him red handed while transferring reports on the Lithuanian Army to a diplomatic representative of the Soviet Union. The representative was not arrested fearing diplomatic complications with the Soviets and was sent back to Moscow. Kleščinskis was arrested on 19 May 1927 and imprisoned in the Sixth Fort of Kaunas Fortress. On 31 May, he was found guilty, stripped of military ranks and pensions, and sentenced to death by a military court. The sentence was carried out by a firing squad the next day. His burial location is not known but believed to be near the Sixth Fort.

== Awards ==
- Order of St. Stanislaus, 3rd class (1905)
- Order of St. Anna, 4th class (1905) and 3rd class (1916)
- Order of St. Vladimir, 4th class (1915)
- Cross of Vytis, 1st degree (1919)
