= Chief of the Defence Staff (Lithuania) =

Head of the Lithuanian Defence Staff

- Lietuvos Kariuomenės Gynybos Štabo Viršininkas
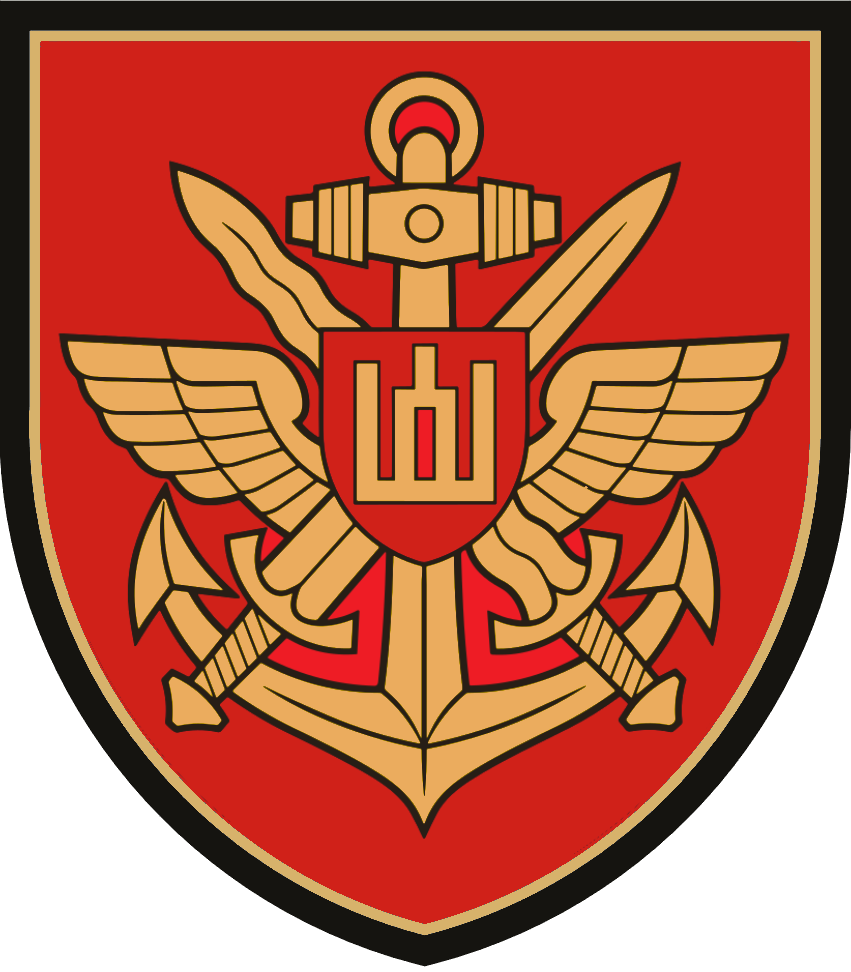
- Insignia of the Lithuanian Armed Forces Defence Staff
- Incumbent; Remigijus Baltrėnas since 21 August 2024
- Lithuanian Armed Forces
- Member of: Defence Staff
- Reports to: Chief of Defence
- Formation: 23 November 1918
- First holder: Jurgis Kubilius

Chief of the Defence Staff is the head of the Lithuanian Defence Staff responsible for the administrative, operational, and logistical needs of the Lithuanian Armed Forces.

== List of chiefs ==
=== Chiefs of the General Staff (1918–1940) ===
No.	Portrait	Chief of the General Staff	Took office	Left office	Time in office	Ref.
1	Jurgis Kubilius [lt]	Colonel (pulkininkas); Jurgis Kubilius (1875–1961)	23 November 1918	24 December 1918	30 days	
2	Pranas Liatukas	Karininkas; Pranas Liatukas (1876–1945)	24 December 1918	4 March 1919	70 days	
	Edvardas Adamkavičius	Karininkas; Edvardas Adamkavičius (1888–1957); Acting	4 March 1919	26 March 1919	22 days	
3	Silvestras Žukauskas	General; Silvestras Žukauskas (1860–1937)	26 April 1919	27 May 1919	31 days	
4	Mykolas Velykis [lt]	Karininkas; Mykolas Velykis (1884–1955)	26 May 1919	7 October 1919	131 days	
5	Stasys Nastopka	Lieutenant General; Stasys Nastopka (1881–1939)	7 October 1919	13 July 1920	280 days	
6	Maksimas Katche	Lieutenant General; Maksimas Katche (1879–1933)	13 July 1920	21 August 1920	39 days	
	Adolfas Birontas [lt]	Major; Adolfas Birontas (1885–1958); Acting	21 August 1920	23 August 1920	2 days	
7	Konstantinas Kleščinskis	Colonel; Konstantinas Kleščinskis (1879–1927)	23 August 1920	13 April 1921	233 days	
8	Maksimas Katche	Lieutenant General; Maksimas Katche (1879–1933)	13 April 1921	7 October 1922	1 year, 177 days	
	Jonas Gricius [lt]	Major; Jonas Gricius (1884–1963); Acting	7 October 1922	6 November 1923	1 year, 30 days	
9	Leonas Radus-Zenkavičius [lt]	General; Leonas Radus-Zenkavičius (1874–1946)	6 November 1923	29 February 1924	115 days	
	Jonas Gricius [lt]	Lieutenant colonel Jonas Gricius (1884–1963); Acting	29 February 1924	7 May 1925	1 year, 68 days	
10	Kazys Ladiga	Colonel of the General Staff; Kazys Ladiga (1893–1941)	7 May 1925	16 September 1925	132 days	
	Jonas Gricius [lt]	Lieutenant colonel Jonas Gricius (1884–1963); Acting	16 September 1925	19 October 1925	33 days	
11	Kazys Ladiga	Lieutenant general Kazys Ladiga (1893–1941)	19 October 1925	22 June 1926	246 days	
12	Kazys Škirpa	Lieutenant colonel of the General Staff; Kazys Škirpa (1895–1979)	22 June 1926	24 December 1926	185 days	
13	Teodoras Daukantas	Colonel; Teodoras Daukantas (1884–1960)	24 December 1926	11 August 1927	230 days	
14	Povilas Plechavičius	Colonel of the General Staff; Povilas Plechavičius (1890–1973)	11 August 1927	10 February 1929	1 year, 183 days	
15	Petras Kubiliūnas	Lieutenant general Petras Kubiliūnas (1894–1946)	10 February 1929	7 June 1934	5 years, 117 days	
16	Jonas Jackus [lt]	Lieutenant general Jonas Jackus (1894–1977)	7 June 1934	21 September 1934	106 days	
17	Stasys Raštikis	Lieutenant colonel of the General Staff; Stasys Raštikis (1896–1985)	21 September 1934	1 January 1935	102 days	
18	Jonas Černius	Colonel of the General Staff; Jonas Černius (1898–1977)	1 January 1935	30 March 1939	4 years, 88 days	
19	Stasys Pundzevičius	Divisional general Stasys Pundzevičius (1893–1980)	1 April 1939	15 June 1940	1 year, 75 days	

=== Chiefs of the Defence Staff (since 1990) ===
No.	Portrait	Chief of the General Satff	Took office	Left office	Time in office	Ref.
1	Norbertas Vidrinskas	Colonel; Norbertas Vidrinskas	21 May 1991	3 February 1992	258 days	
2	Valdas Tutkus	Colonel; Valdas Tutkus (born 1960)	3 February 1992	1 February 1993	364 days	
3	Stasys Knezys	Colonel; Stasys Knezys (1948–2011)	1 February 1993	3 January 1994	336 days	
4	Valdas Tutkus	Colonel; Valdas Tutkus (born 1960)	3 January 1994	1 November 1996	2 years, 303 days	
5	Antanas Jurgaitis [lt]	Colonel; Antanas Jurgaitis (born 1957)	4 November 1996	17 March 2003	6 years, 133 days	
6	Vitalijus Vaikšnoras [lt]	Major general Vitalijus Vaikšnoras (born 1961)	24 April 2003	30 June 2008 (Note: During 2008, the Defence Staff was superseded by the Joint Staff. The Defence Staff continued to function until May 2011 and was led by Kęstutis Macijauskas (2008–2010) and Edvardas Mažeikis (2010–2011).)	5 years, 67 days	
7	Algis Vaičeliūnas [lt]	Algis Vaičeliūnas (born 1961)	23 April 2008	29 June 2011	3 years, 67 days	
8	Vilmantas Tamošaitis [lt]	Brigade general Vilmantas Tamošaitis (born 1966)	29 June 2011	16 August 2016	5 years, 48 days	
9	Vitalijus Vaikšnoras [lt]	Major general Vitalijus Vaikšnoras (born 1961)	16 August 2016	29 July 2019	2 years, 344 days	
10	Gintautas Zenkevičius	Brigade general Gintautas Zenkevičius (1962–2021)	29 July 2019	25 September 2020	1 year, 57 days	
11	Mindaugas Steponavičius	Major general Mindaugas Steponavičius (born 1974)	25 September 2020	8 August 2024	3 years, 335 days	
12	Remigijus Baltrėnas	Lieutenant general Remigijus Baltrėnas (born 1974)	8 August 2024	30 July 2025	340 days	
13	Giedrius Premeneckas	Counter admiral Giedrius Premeneckas (born 1974)	30 July 2025		1 year, 39 days	
