= Maksimas Katche =

Lithuanian general (1879–1933)

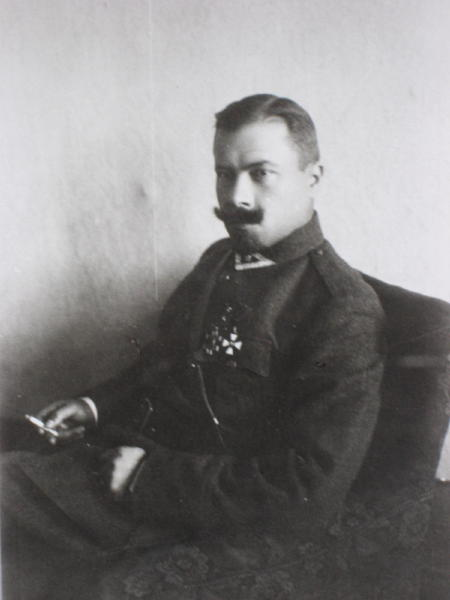
- Maksimas Katche (Max Kattchée)
- Born: 5 November 1879; Joniškis, Russian Empire
- Died: 10 June 1933 (aged 54); Biržai, Lithuania
- Military career
- Allegiance: Russian Empire; Lithuania
- Branch: Imperial Russian Army; Lithuanian Armed Forces
- Service years: 1899–1922
- Rank: Lieutenant general
- Commands: Chief of the General Staff of the Lithuanian Army
- Conflicts: Russo-Japanese War; World War I Lithuanian Wars of Independence

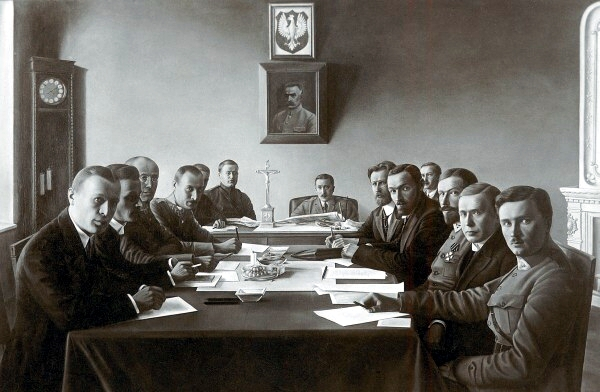
Polish (left) and Lithuanian (right) delegates at the negotiation table during the Suwałki Conference

Maksimas Katche (German: Wilhelm Johannes Arwed Max Kattchée, Russian: Макс Арведович Катхе, 5 November [O.S. 24 October] 1879 – 10 June 1933), was a Russian colonel and Lithuanian lieutenant general.

In 1899, he graduated from an infantry school and served in the Imperial Russian Army. He fought in the Russo-Japanese War and in World War I, attaining the rank of colonel in 1916. In April 1919, he joined the Lithuanian Army and fought successfully against Bolsheviks and Bermontians in the Lithuanian Wars of Independence. Katche chaired the Lithuanian delegation that negotiated and signed the Suwałki Agreement on 7 October 1920 with Poland. He was twice appointed to Chief of the General Staff of the Lithuanian Army and was promoted to lieutenant general in March 1920. In early 1921, he organised the Higher Officers' Courses and was their first chief. He retired from active duty in October 1922 and died in Biržai in 1933.

== Biography ==
=== Russian Empire ===
Katche was born into a family of millers of Baltic German descent and Lutheran faith. He was born in Joniškis, then part of the Kovno Governorate, Russian Empire. After graduating from a gymnasium in Riga in 1897, he enrolled at the St. Petersburg Infantry Cadet School. He graduated in 1899 and was assigned to the 116th Maloyaroslavl Infantry Regiment.

He participated in the Russo-Japanese War and was injured in February 1905. He suffered from shell shock but was awarded the Order of St. George in 1907. In 1908–1911, he worked at Vilnius Military School and was promoted to captain. In 1913, he returned to active military duty and was assigned to the 108th Saratov Infantry Regiment.

During World War I, he fought with the regiment in present-day Lithuania, Poland, Belarus and was injured in August 1914 and August 1915. He was promoted to colonel (polkovnik) and awarded the Saint George Sword in 1916. In 1917, he briefly commanded the 682nd Baikal and the 17th Infantry Regiments. In April 1917, he joined the headquarters of the Minsk Military District.

=== Independent Lithuania ===
At the end of 1918, Katche returned to now independent Lithuania. In April 1919, he joined the Lithuanian Army and was assigned as instructor of the Panevėžys Battalion. He soon took command of the Panevėžys Group and helped plan the Lithuanian offensive which pushed the invading Bolshevik forces across the Daugava River by end of August 1919. He then fought against the Bermontians. On 1 March 1920, he was promoted to lieutenant general. He briefly served as the Chief of the General Staff (13 July to 21 August 1920). In October 1920, he chaired the Lithuanian delegation which negotiated and signed the Suwałki Agreement with Poland. When Poland staged the Żeligowski's Mutiny and captured Vilnius, he was sent to Latvia in November in an effort to conclude a military alliance against Poland and Żeligowski. Latvia rejected a direct military alliance but agreed to support Lithuania by providing military specialists and military equipment.

In early 1921, he organized the Higher Officers' Courses for senior officers of the Lithuanian Army and became their first chief. At the same time, he again became Chief of the General Staff on 13 April 1921. Carrying out both duties proved to be difficult and he resigned from the Higher Officers' Courses in July 1921. He was a member of a Lithuanian delegation sent to the League of Nations in Geneva to negotiate with Poland regarding Vilnius Region in September 1921. However, he became ill on the way and spend about a month recovering. In August 1922, Kazys Ladiga submitted a complaint that a "Russian monarchist" party was active in the Lithuanian military and that Katche was part of it. Ladiga was punished with 7-day arrest for false report but Katche resigned on 7 October 1922 (officially, for health reasons).

=== Retirement ===
Katche retired to Biržai, the birthplace of his wife Berta Jansonaitė. He worked at a bank and as a director of a factory. He died in Biržai on 10 June 1933. His funeral was a public affair and included a flyby of military airplanes. His grave stone disappeared during the Soviet period and the exact location of his burial has long been debated. In 2019, the government of Lithuania declared his grave a state protected monument and a new grave stone was unveiled on 23 November 2019.

== Awards ==
- Order of St. Anna, 4th class (1905) and 2nd class (1916)
- Order of St. Stanislaus, 3rd class (1905) and 2nd class (1910)
- Order of St. George, 4th degree (1907)
- Order of St. Vladimir, 4th class (1915)
- Saint George Sword (1916)
- Lithuanian Cross of Vytis, 4th and 5th classes (1919)
- Latvian Order of Lāčplēsis, 3rd class (1924)
- Lithuanian Independence Medal (1928)
