= Stasys Nastopka =

Lithuanian military officer (1881–1938)

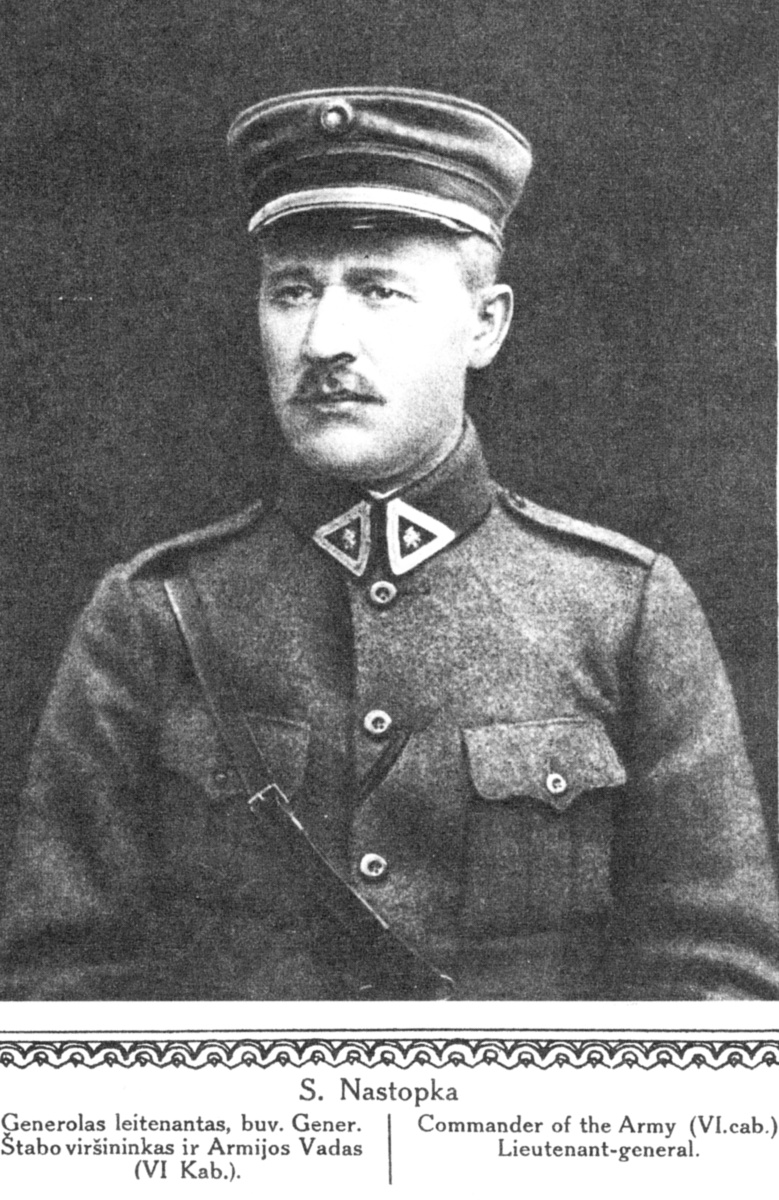
- Born: 19 June 1881; Rinkuškiai, Russian Empire
- Died: 19 October 1938 (aged 57) Biržai, Lithuania
- Allegiance: Imperial Russian Army; Lithuanian Armed Forces
- Service years: 1902–1918 (Russia); 1918–1924 (Lithuania)
- Commands: 178th Venden Infantry Regiment; Separate Lithuanian Battalion; 2nd Brigade; Chief of the Lithuanian General Staff
- Conflicts: World War I; Lithuanian Wars of Independence; Lithuanian–Soviet War; Polish–Lithuanian War; Central Lithuanian offensive of October 1920 (surrendered)

Stasys Nastopka (19 June 1881 – 19 October 1938) was a Lithuanian military officer during World War I and the Lithuanian Wars of Independence.

Born into a Lithuanian peasant family, Nastopka graduated from Vilnius Military School and served in the Imperial Russian Army. During World War I, he was promoted to lieutenant colonel (podpolkovnik) and commanded the 178th Venden Infantry Regiment. In 1918, he returned to Lithuania and volunteered for its newly established Lithuanian Army.

During the Lithuanian–Soviet War, he commanded the Separate Brigade that carried out the first organized Lithuanian offensive in April 1919 and the Panevėžys Group which pushed the Soviets across Daugava by August 1919. In October 1919, when West Russian Volunteer Army attacked Lithuania, Nastopka became the Chief of the General Staff and was promoted to lieutenant general. When Poland staged the Żeligowski's Mutiny in October 1920, Nastopka commanded the 1st Division which attempted a counteroffensive, but almost the entire command, including Nastopka, was captured by Polish troops. After the return from captivity, he was army's inspector and retired from the military in 1924.

== Biography ==
=== Russian Empire ===
Stasys Nastopka was born on 19 June 1881 in Rinkuškiai near Biržai. He was the youngest of three sons in a peasant family of Evangelical Reformed (Calvinist) faith. Despite his father's death in 1894, Nastopka completed six classes at the real school in Bauska and passed his gymnasium examination in Vilnius in 1902.

In 1902, he voluntarily joined the Russian Imperial Army and was assigned to the 3rd Kaunas Fortress Regiment. In 1904–1907, he studied at Vilnius Military School. After graduation in August 1907, he was assigned to the 2nd Warsaw Fortress Regiment and then to the 178th Venden Infantry Regiment in Penza in 1910. He fought in World War I in Poland, Galicia, and near Baranovichi. In 1916, he fought on the Riga front near Ķemeri and Sloka. In September 1916, he was promoted to lieutenant colonel (podpolkovnik). He was injured twice to the legs and spine, which had a lasting impact on his health. On 4 August 1917, he became the commander of the 178th Venden Infantry Regiment.

From 24 January to 24 April 1918, he was the commander of the Separate Lithuanian Battalion in Vitebsk. The Bolshevik government wanted to send the battalion to suppress the Polish 1st Corps in Russia commanded by Józef Dowbor-Muśnicki. The battalion resisted the orders and was disbanded.

=== Independent Lithuania ===
==== Against the Soviets ====
Nastopka returned to Lithuania in November 1918 and voluntarily joined the newly established Lithuanian Army. By the first order of the Lithuanian Ministry of Defence, Nastopka was appointed a member of the National Defence Council. From December 1918 to March 1919, he was the chief of the procurement department of the Ministry of Defence.

As Soviet Red Army invaded Lithuania and the Lithuanian Army lacked experienced officers, Nastopka was sent to the front in March 1919. On 11 March 1919, he became the commander of the Separate Brigade (later renamed to the 2nd Brigade) composed primarily of the 1st and 2nd Infantry Regiments. This unit carried out the first organized Lithuanian offensive on 3–8 April 1919. In mid-May 1919, the Lithuanian Army began counterattacking the Soviet forces. Nastopka led the Panevėžys Group which was charged with capturing Panevėžys and then pushing along the Kupiškis–Rokiškis–Obeliai line. By 29 August, the Soviets were pushed out of Lithuania and across the Daugava River.

==== Chief of the General Staff ====
On 7 October 1919, Nastopka became the Chief of the General Staff. The following day, he was promoted to Lieutenant General. This promotion occurred just as the West Russian Volunteer Army (also known as Bermontians) intensified their attacks against Lithuania. They were defeated and retreated from Lithuania and Latvia by the end of 1919. In January–May 1920, Nastopka was also the chief of the Kaunas garrison. In this capacity, he led the suppression of the Kaunas garrison mutiny in Aukštoji Panemunė on 22–23 February.

==== Against Poland ====
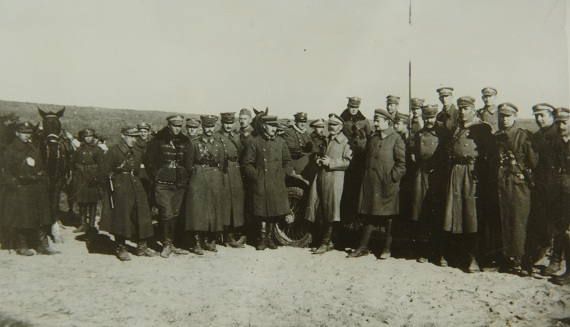
Polish Uhlans and the captured staff of the Lithuanian army. In the first row, in the 6th position, stands General Stasys Nastopka

From 13 July to 23 August 1920, he was the acting commander of the army (deputy of the Chief Commander). In this capacity, he commanded Lithuanian units towards Vilnius where they were stopped by the retreating Polish units which allowed the city to be captured by Soviet forces during the Polish–Soviet War. On 23 August 1920, Nastopka was assigned as the commander of the 1st Division (2nd, 4th, 7th and 9th Infantry Regiments).

When Poland staged the Żeligowski's Mutiny, the Lithuanian Army retreated from Vilnius on 8 October 1920 (resulting in the Polish control of Vilnius Region that dominated Lithuania's foreign affairs until 1939). On October 18, the Lithuanian army began a failed counteroffensive to retake Vilnius. The 13th Wilno Uhlan Regiment (a Polish cavalry unit) manoeuvred behind the 1st Division's positions and captured its command, including Nastopka, on October 21. He was held in a prison in Antakalnis.

==== Later life ====
Nastopka returned from Polish captivity on 4 December 1920. He was army's inspector from July 1921 to October 1923 when he became officer of special affairs reporting to the Chief Commander. He retired from the military on 23 July 1924 for health reasons.

He settled in Biržai and worked on his farm – as a military volunteer, he was granted 20 hectares (49 acres) of land. His war-time spine injury caused him continuous health issues, including painful episodes of paralysis. After one such episode, Nastopka died suddenly on 19 October 1938. He was buried at the Reformed Cemetery in his native Rinkuškiai. His funeral was an official affair, attended by many military officials and accompanied by a cannon salvo. A new grave stone by architect Rita Vėlyvienė was unveiled in 1992.

== Medals ==
- Order of St Anna 2nd, 3rd, and 4th class (Russian Empire)
- Order of St Stanislaus 2nd and 3rd class (Russian Empire)
- Order of St Vladimir 4th class (Russian Empire)
- Order of the Cross of Vytis 5th class (Lithuania) in 1919
- Order of Lāčplēsis 3rd degree (Latvia) in 1924
- Independence Medal (Lithuania) in 1928
- Latvian War of Independence 10 Year Anniversary Commemorative Medal in 1929
