= Defence Staff (Lithuania) =

- Gynybos štabas
- Active: 1918–1940, 1990–
- Country: Lithuania
- Allegiance: Lithuania Armed Forces
- Branch: Joint
- Type: Staff
- Role: Operational command and strategic planning
- Garrison/HQ: Vilnius

Commanders
- Chief of the Defence Staff: Remigijus Baltrėnas

The Defence Staff (Lithuanian: Gynybos štabas) is the main staff of the Lithuanian Armed Forces. Since 2008, the staff has reported to the Chief of Defence. Its main tasks are to plan, lead, and support military operations as well as to prepare strategic military plans.

== Names ==
The Defence Staff was known by different names during its history:

- General Staff (Generalinis štabas) in 1918–1924
- Supreme Staff (Vyriausiasis štabas) in 1924–1935
- Army Staff (Kariuomenės štabas) in 1935–1940
- Defence Staff (Gynybos štabas) in 1991–1992, 1996–2008, since 2018
- Joint Staff (Jungtinis štabas) in 1992–1993, 2008–2018
- Staff of the Armed Forces (Ginkluotųjų pajėgų štabas) in 1993–1994
- General Staff (Generalinis štabas) in 1994–1996

== Interwar Lithuania (1918–1940) ==
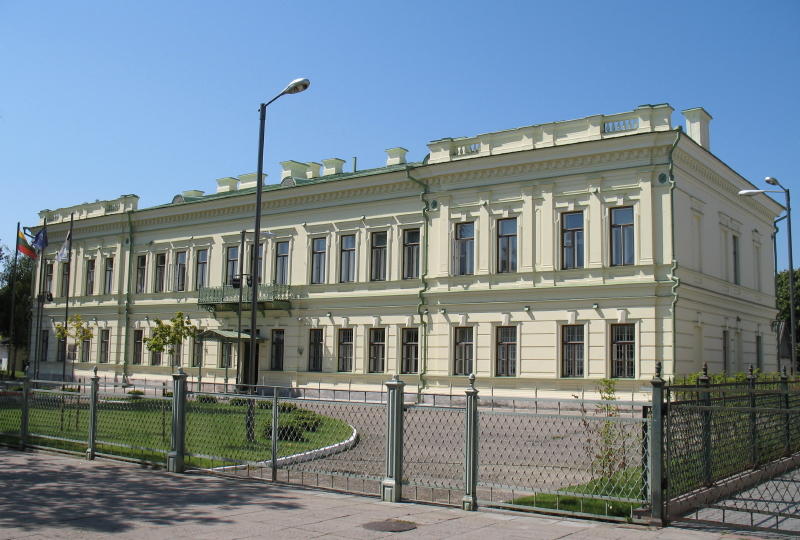
Headquarters of the General Staff in 1919–1940

Lithuania declared independence in February 1918. The first order to organize the Lithuanian Army was issued by Prime Minister Augustinas Voldemaras on 11 November 1918. The same order established the General Staff. The staff was initially located in Vilnius but had to evacuate to Kaunas at the outbreak of the Lithuanian–Soviet War.

The General Staff had four main operative departments in charge of mobilization and organization of military units, information gathering, military operations and education, and logistics (supply, communications, transport). The staff was severely understaffed. For example, at one point, the department in charge of planning military operations during the Lithuanian Wars of Independence had only three officers. Therefore, it could only gather information and planning of operations fell to the commanders of the military units. Only one officer, Konstantinas Kleščinskis who joined the Lithuanian Army in May 1919, had general staff education or experience. That is because after the Uprising of 1863, Lithuanians were not considered reliable and were not admitted to Russian military academies. Additionally, the staff saw frequent leadership changes – in four years between November 1918 and October 1922, the staff was commanded by eight different chiefs. As a result, many operations during the Wars of Independence were poorly planned.

After the wars, the military took steps in raising qualifications of the officers. Since Lithuania did not have its on staff college, most promising officers were sent to study at the War College and the Military Intendant School (Vojenská intendantská škola) in Prague because Czechoslovakia was a small friendly nation therefore its military education more closely matched the realities of Lithuania. Few other officers were sent to Italian, French, Belgian, German military academies. In 1932, Lithuania reorganized its own Higher Officers' Courses to a staff college. Three classes of officers graduated before 1940. At the time, out of 125 officers in the General Staff, most had appropriate military education.

After military reforms of Stasys Raštikis, the General Staff became subordinated to the commander of the Lithuanian Army and not to the Minister of Defence. The Lithuanian Army was liquidated and transformed into units of the Red Army after the Soviet occupation in June 1940. The General Staff was officially liquidated on 27 October 1940.

== Restoration and NATO ==
Lithuania restored independence in March 1990 and started organizing its armed forces. The Defence Staff was established on 21 May 1991 by the Ministry of National Defence. In February 1992, the staff was liquidated as a separate legal entity and became a department of the ministry. From January 1994 to November 1996, the staff was subordinated to the command of the armed forces and not the ministry. The main tasks of the Defence Staff included planning armed defence of Lithuania, coordinating activities of different branches of the armed forces, planning and coordinating Lithuania's participation in international military missions and cooperation with foreign militaries, organizing military procurement, and implementing NATO standards.

On 23 April 2008, the new Joint Staff under the Armed Forces was created to handle operational tasks. It was to employ 140 people. The old Defence Staff continued to handle strategic planning until May 2011 when it was replaced by general director of capabilities and armaments. The main objective of the Joint Staff is to plan, lead, and support military operations, including international cooperation missions (e.g. International Security Assistance Force or Kosovo Force), of the Lithuanian Armed Forces. The staff coordinates activities of all branches of the military. Another task of the Joint Staff was preparing the Lithuanian military doctrine. The first doctrine was approved and adopted in March 2010. The Joint Staff was renamed the Defence Staff on 1 January 2018. It continues to handle operational functions and also assumed the strategic planning functions.

== Chiefs ==
The Chief of the Defence Staff is nominated by the Chief of Defence and approved by the Ministry of National Defence. Since September 2020, the Chief of the Defence Staff has been Mindaugas Steponavičius. The chiefs are usually rotated every three to five years.
