= Mindaugas Steponavičius =

- Born: 12 August 1974 (age 52); Venta, Lithuania
- Military career
- Allegiance: Lithuania
- Branch: Lithuanian Armed Forces
- Service years: 1999-present
- Rank: Brigade General

11th Chief of the Defence Staff of Lithuania
- In office 25 September 2020 – 21 August 2024
- President: Gitanas Nausėda
- Preceded by: Gintautas Zenkevičius
- Succeeded by: Remigijus Baltrėnas

Brigade general Mindaugas Steponavičius (Lithuanian: [/mɪnˈdɑʊɡɐs ˈstɛpɔːnɑːvɪtʃʊs/]; born 12 August 1974) is a Lithuanian military officer who has been serving as the Chief of the Defence Staff of Lithuania since 25 September 2020.

== Education ==
In 1999, he graduated from the General Jonas Žemaitis Lithuanian Military Academy, and later attended the Baltic Defence College in Tartu, followed by the United States Army War College in Carlisle, Pennsylvania.

== Career ==
In 1999, Mindaugas Steponavičius was appointed as the Chief Specialist for Tactical Intelligence in the Intelligence Department of the Mechanised Infantry Brigade Iron Wolf. He served as an intelligence officer and later as the head of the department until 2004. From 2004 to 2008, he was the Chief of Staff of the Algirdas Mechanised Infantry Battalion and an officer in the International Operations Department of the Lithuanian Armed Forces Defence Staff J3/J2. Between 2008 and 2014, he commanded the Uhlan Battalion. From 2014 to 2016, he served in the Capability Planning Department of the Ministry of National Defence. Between 2016 and 2019, he was the commander of the Mechanised Infantry Brigade Iron Wolf, and from 2019 to 2020, he led the Training and Doctrine Directorate of the Lithuanian Armed Forces. From 2020 to 2024, he served as the Chief of the Defence Staff. Since 2024, he has been serving at the Permanent Representation of the Republic of Lithuania to NATO and the European Union.

== Awards ==
Knight's Cross of the Order of the Lithuanian Grand Duke Gediminas
Order of the Cross of Vytis
