= Gintautas Zenkevičius =

Lithuanian military officer (1962–2021)

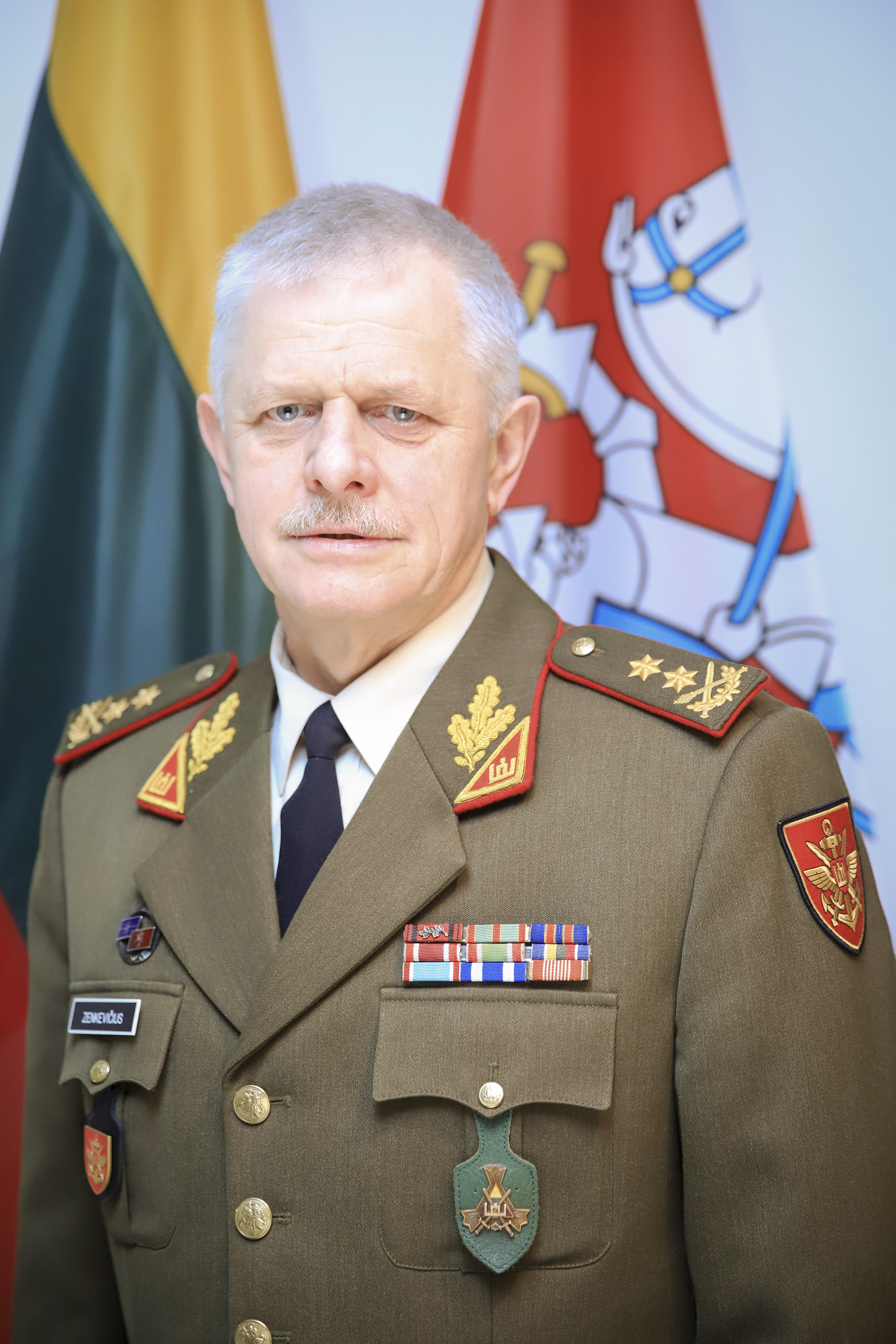
- Portrait of Zenkevičius
- Born: 24 September 1962; Alytus District Municipality, Lithuania
- Died: 19 November 2021 (aged 59)
- Burial place: Antakalnis Cemetery
- Education: Royal College of Defence Studies
- Spouse: Snieguolė
- Children: Milda, Justinas
- Military career
- Allegiance: Lithuania
- Branch: Lithuanian Land Forces
- Service years: 1991–2020
- Awards: Medal of volunteers of the Creators of the Lithuanian Armed Forces; Knight's Cross of the Order of the Cross of The Vistula

10th Chief of the Defence Staff of Lithuania
- In office 29 July 2019 – 25 September 2020
- President: Gitanas Nausėda
- Preceded by: Vitalijus Vaikšnoras
- Succeeded by: Mindaugas Steponavičius

Brigade general Gintautas Zenkevičius (Lithuanian: [ˈɡʲintɐʊ̯tɐs ˈzɛnˈkʲɛvʲɪtʃʲʊs]; 24 September 1962 – 19 November 2021) was a Lithuanian military officer, holding the rank of brigade general, and a former Chief of the Defence Staff of Lithuania.

== Education ==
1980–1985, he studied at Kaunas Polytechnic Institute and acquired the specialty of radio equipment constructor technologist.1999–2000, studied at the Joint Forces Command and Staff College. At the same time, he received a Master of Defense Sciences from the Royal College of the University of London.

== Career ==
- 2004–2005: Assistant Chief of Staff for Planning (Chief of J5) at the Defence Staff in the Ministry of National Defence.
- 2005: Commander of the Lithuania-led Provincial Reconstruction Team in Afghanistan's Ghor province.
- 2007–2008: Director of the LAF Transformation Project, focusing on adopting a capabilities-based approach in defence planning and streamlining command structures.
- 2008–2010: Inspector General of the Ministry of National Defence.
- 2010–2013: Director of Management at NATO's Supreme Headquarters Allied Powers Europe (SHAPE), overseeing working processes, base support infrastructure, and personnel welfare.
- 2013–2014: Director General for Capabilities and Armaments at the Ministry of National Defence, responsible for capability planning, defence transformation, and armament acquisition.
- 2014–2018: Lithuania's Military Representative to the NATO and EU Military Committees, serving as Dean of the latter from July 2017.
- 2018–2019: Commander of the Training and Doctrine Command of the LAF.
- 2019–2020: Chief of the Defence Staff and Deputy Commander of the LAF.
