= War College (Prague) =

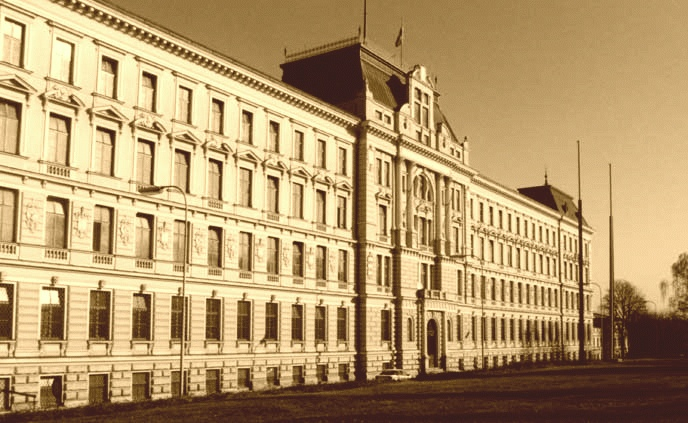
- Prague; Czechoslovakia

Information
- Type: military staff college
- Opened: 1921
- Closed: 1938

The War College (Czech: Vysoká škola válečná) was a military staff college in Prague established by the government of Czechoslovakia in 1921 with the assistance of France. Originally called the War School, it was renamed the War College in 1934. It occupied the third floor of Tychonova 1 in Prague - as of 2017 the headquarters of the Czech Ministry of Defense.

Notable alumni of the War College included Emanuel Moravec. The War College ceased operations in 1938.
