= Higher Officers' Courses =

- Founded: 1 April 1921
- Disbanded: 30 September 1940

The Higher Officers' Courses (Lithuanian: Aukštieji karininkų kursai) were military courses for senior officers of the Lithuanian Army in 1921–1940. Junior officers were prepared by the War School of Kaunas. In July 1923, the courses were named after Vytautas, Grand Duke of Lithuania, who commanded Lithuanian forces in the 1410 Battle of Grunwald.

The courses were established after the Lithuanian Wars of Independence. Due to difficult post-war conditions, the new school lacked qualified lecturers and teaching materials but steadily grew and improved. The courses grew by adding specialized sections for artillery officers (1923) and physical education instructors (1924) as well as merging previously independent courses for military technicians and aviators in 1927. In total, Higher Officers' Courses prepared 704 officers. In addition, the courses organized several one-time courses in specialized military fields, e.g. topography, military administration, machine gun operation, etc.

The school was reorganized in April 1932 – various sections were removed and the courses now prepared officers for the General Staff (previously, Lithuanian officers of the General Staff were sent to various foreign military academies). This effectively made the courses a higher military school but the name was officially changed only in December 1938 to the Higher Military School (Lithuanian: Aukštoji karo mokykla). Three classes of officers plus a class of intendants (a total of 65 men) graduated from the school before Soviet Union occupied Lithuania in June 1940 and the school was liquidated on 30 September.

== Official names ==
The courses were officially known as:

- 1 April 1921 – 15 July 1923: Higher Officers' Courses (Aukštieji karininkų kursai)
- 15 July 1923 – 15 February 1930: Higher Officers' Courses of Grand Duke of Lithuania Vytautas the Great (Aukštieji karininkų Didžiojo Lietuvos kunigaikščio Vytauto kursai)
- 15 February 1930 – 10 December 1938: Officers' Courses of Vytautas the Great (Vytauto Didžiojo karininkų kursai)
- 10 December 1938 – 15 June 1940: Higher War School of Vytautas the Great (Vytauto Didžiojo aukštoji karo mokykla)

== History ==
=== Establishment ===
Graduates of the General Section
Class	Date	Graduates
1st	1922-01-30	50
2nd	1922-10-06	69
3rd	1923-10-23	66
4th	1924-08-15	70
5th	1925-07-15	52
6th	1926-07-01	65
7th	1928-11-28	33

When newly independent Lithuania began building its own armed forces in late 1918, it recruited Lithuanians who had previously served with the Russian Imperial Army during World War I. The men had varied background and education. There was a dire need for courses for officers but due to the difficult post-war conditions, lack of qualified instructors, and ongoing Lithuanian Wars of Independence the first temporary courses for officers were held in January–August 1920. The courses had two sections – pioneer (lasting three months) and infantry (lasting six weeks). The courses were commanded by British Lt Col Roger Henry Monck-Mason (25 January to 2 March) and Lithuanian pulkininkas Aleksandras Uspenskis (2 March to 16 August).

The permanent Higher Officers' Courses were established on 1 April 1921 by the order of the Minister of Defense in Kaunas. They were supposed to last five months. The official opening of the courses took place on 13 April. The beginnings were difficult – there were not enough lecturers, there were no textbooks, about half of the lectures were held in Russian due to poor Lithuanian language skills, etc. Due to increased international tensions, the courses were suspended from 1 June to 20 September 1921. The first class of 50 officers graduated on 30 January 1922. The courses were extended to eight months, placed greater emphasis on tactics and wargames, and added foreign language (English, French, German) lessons so that graduates could follow foreign military press. The second class of 69 officers graduated on 6 October 1922.

The statute of the courses was finally adopted by the Constituent Assembly of Lithuania on 3 October 1922. The courses continued to improve their conditions. For example, lecturers published textbooks and lecture notes, library amassed sufficient military literature, a proper dormitory was obtained for students, etc. In July 1923, the courses organized the first demonstrations of its tactical exercises. At the same time, the courses organized its first celebration on 15 July commemorating the Polish–Lithuanian victory in the Battle of Grunwald in 1410. President Aleksandras Stulginskis renamed the courses in honour of the Grand Duke Vytautas the Great who commanded Lithuanian forces in the battle. Later, demonstrations of tactical exercises became part of the graduation ceremonies.

=== Specialized sections ===
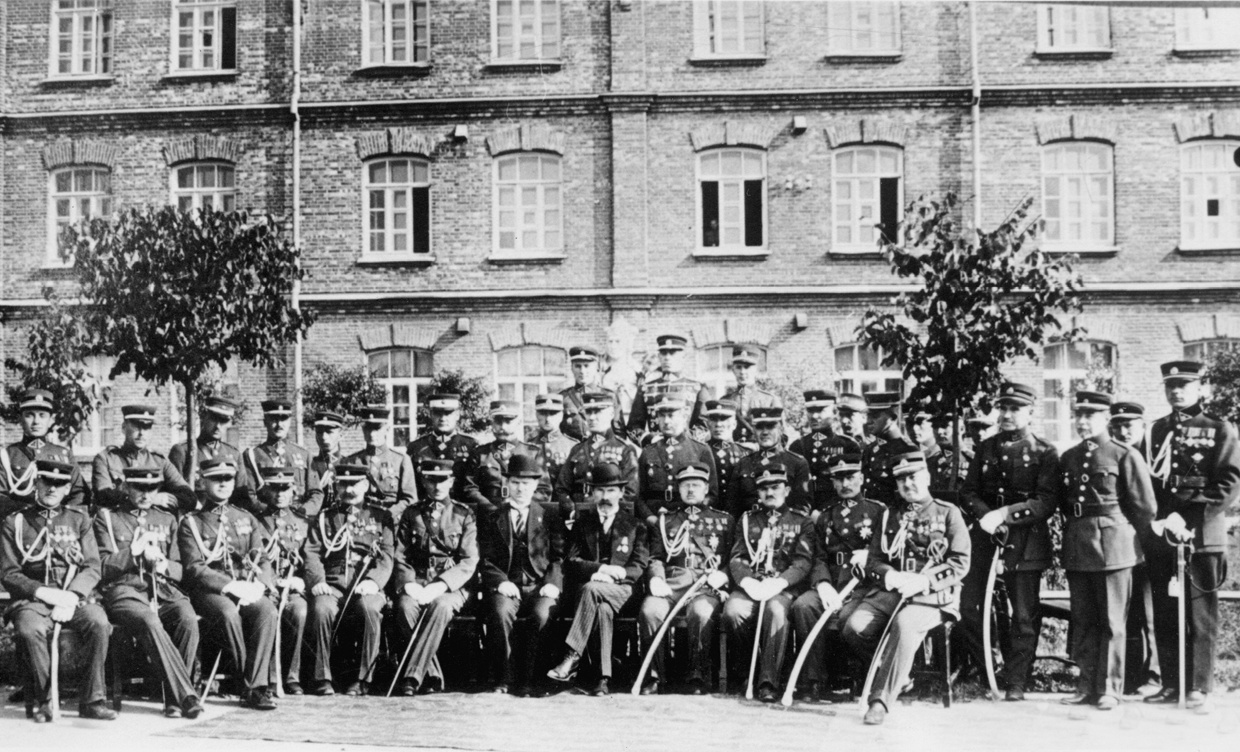
Listeners and lecturers of the Higher Officers' Courses with Lithuanian heads of state and military

The curriculum of the officers' courses was inconsistent and sometimes contradictory to the teaching of junior officers at War School of Kaunas. To fix this, the war school was subordinated to the officers' courses from November 1923 for about two years. In November 1923, the courses relocated from the city center to larger premises in Panemunė. With the relocation, the courses were expanded by adding an artillery section. These artillery courses lasted two years and the first class of 15 men graduated on 15 July 1925. Due to very different backgrounds and experience of the men, the courses had to spend a lot of time on teaching general subjects and in particular math before advancing to more specialized artillery topics. Therefore, the next class had to complete preparatory math courses and pass entrance examinations. This delayed the start date of the next artillery courses to November 1926. The relocation also allowed the courses to establish courses for physical education instructors who would then teach soldiers gymnastics, fencing, and athletics. The physical education studies began on 10 July 1924.

In September 1926, the government decided to expand the Higher Officers' Courses by merging in previously independent Higher Courses of Military Technology (established in January 1924 with construction and electrotechnics sections) and Aviation Courses (established in 1919). Due to administrative delays, the merger was completed only in March 1927. This was done to reduce costs, remove duplication of efforts, and standardize military education. Thus the expanded officers' courses had six sections: general, artillery, engineering (with construction and fortifications subsections), technical (with communication and automobile subsections), aviation, and physical education. The courses lasted a year in the general section, six months in the physical education section, and two years in other sections. The students received free housing as well as the same salary as while on active duty. In return, the men were required to serve in the Lithuanian Army for twice the length of their studies. In the 1928–1929 academic year, the courses had 62 lecturers.

The general section was suspended in November 1928 as the military determined there were enough officers with this kind of education. The artillery section prepared 83 officers in five classes (last one in 1933). The engineering section prepared two classes of 31 officers (14 men graduated in February 1929 and 17 men graduated in February 1932). The technical section prepared three classes of officers: 16 men graduated in January 1928, 12 men in July 1930, and 18 men in December 1932. The aviation section prepared two classes of aviators: 15 men graduated in July 1927, 9 men in February 1930, and 19 men in May 1932. In 1932, the aviation section was again spun out as a separate two-year Military Aviation School. The physical education section prepared about 100 men in five classes (last one in 1930). In total, Higher Officers' Courses prepared 704 officers.

In addition to permanent courses, the Higher Officers' Courses also held one-time specialized courses. For example, courses were held for military chaplains in May 1922, active infantry officers in October–November 1922, military intelligence officers in November 1922, military officials and clerks in September–December 1926, reserve officers in November–December 1927, commanders of divisions and regiments in October 1929 – July 1930, topographers in October 1930 – June 1931. There were also some temporary courses that were repeated several times: for military administrators (in 1933, 1935, 1939), machine gun operators (in 1932, 1934, 1935), military firemen (in 1928, 1932).

In June 1933, after the establishment of the General Staff section, the general and artillery sections were transferred to the War School of Kaunas and the engineering and technical sections to the director of military technology.

=== Higher Military School ===
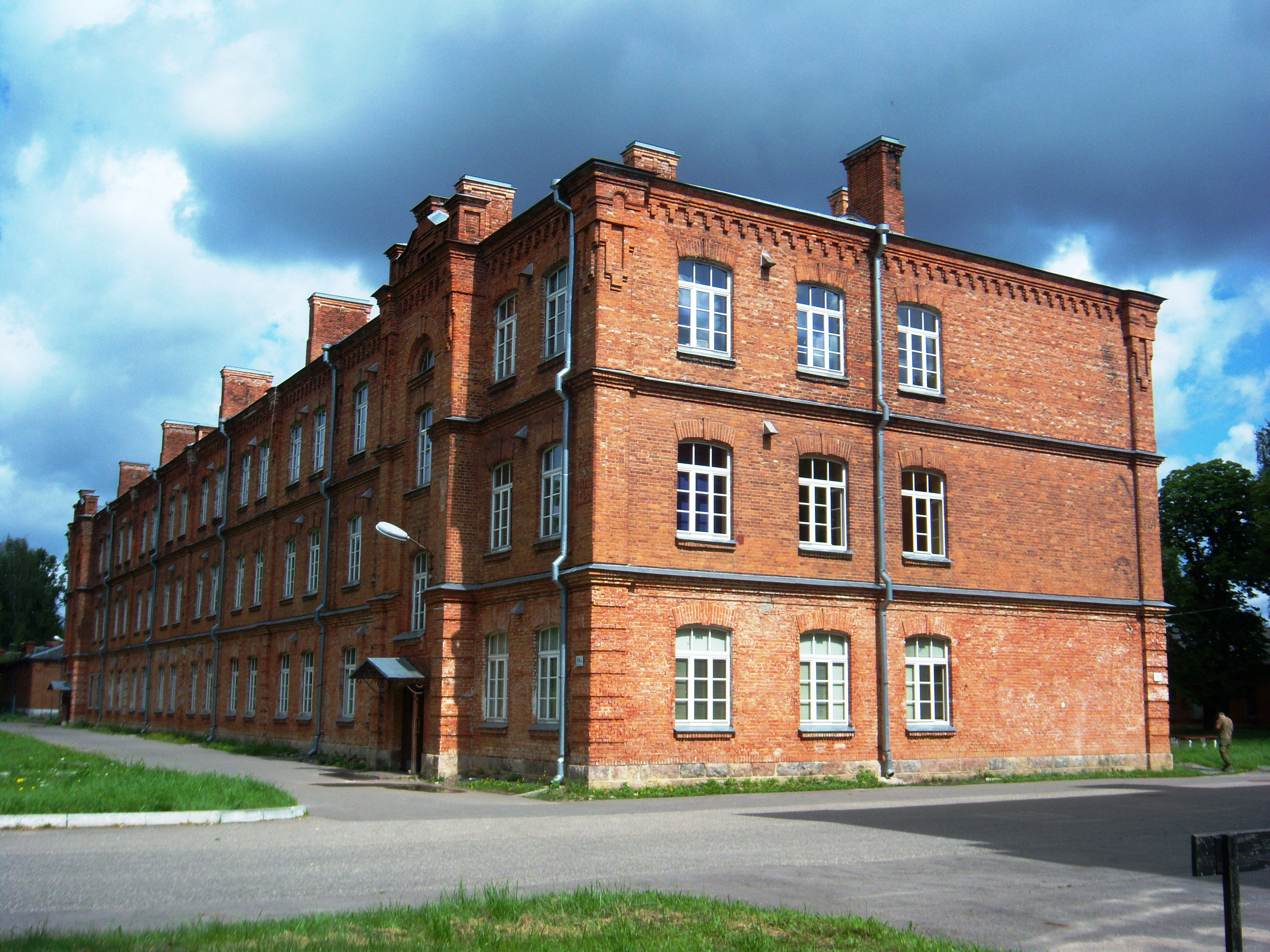
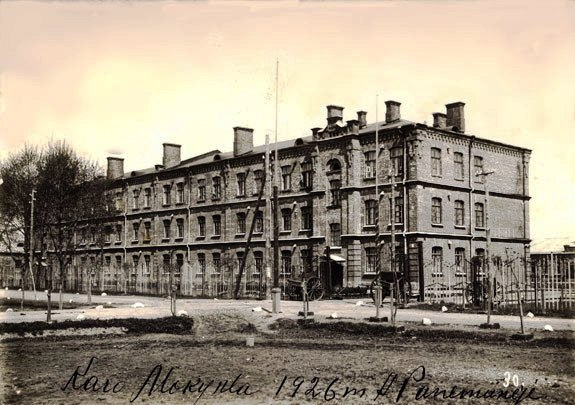
One of the Higher Military School buildings in Panemunė in 2012 (now Barracks of Vytautas the Great Jaeger Battalion) and in 1926

Due to lack of a higher military school, every year, Lithuania would send several promising officers to various military academies abroad. This was expensive and insufficient for the needs of the Lithuanian Army. The idea for a Lithuanian higher military school was publicly raised by Petras Kubiliūnas. Preparations for the establishment of the General Staff section began in 1927. It was intended to prepare not only officers but also commanders. The section was finally established on 1 April 1932 which elevated the courses to the status of a higher military school. However, it continued to operate under the old name of Officers' Courses of Vytautas the Great until a law enacted on 10 December 1938 changed its name to the Higher War School of Vytautas the Great.

Candidates for the General Staff courses had to pass two rounds of examinations in spring and fall 1931 and complete a traineeship during the summer. Twenty men were admitted. The main military subjects were taught by the officers of the General Staff who had received education abroad. The men could specialize in infantry, artillery, cavalry, aviation, or engineering. The first class of 18 men graduated on 18 May 1934. The ceremony, which included a Catholic mass held by Vladas Mironas, was attended by President Antanas Smetona and many of the government ministers which indicated how significant the school was for the government.

The second class was supposed to star its studies in fall 1934 but they were delayed to 1 March 1935 – as the military began implementing reforms initiated by Stasys Raštikis, commanders realized that they needed more trained officers and wanted to admit additional students to the military school. Three officers were sent to study at the military academies in Paris, Prague, and Brussels. The officers had to complete a traineeship (14.5 months in various military units, General Staff, or proving ground) and 28 months of academic study. The academic studies emphasized practical exercises, war games, experiments over theory. 20 officers, including Vytautas Bulvičius and Antanas Impulevičius, graduated in June 1937. Candidates to the third class took entrance examinations in October 1936 – out of 34 candidates only 22 were admitted and began their studies in September 1937. In December 1938, the school had 23 lecturers. The third class of 19 officers graduated in July 1939. There were at least 96 applications to the fourth class but only 25 were admitted (including one man from the Latvian Army).

In August 1934, the Officers' Courses of Vytautas the Great established courses for intendants (officers responsible for supplies and other logistics). The first and only class admitted only eight officers who graduated in June 1937.

=== Liquidation ===
The fourth class began its studies on 1 September 1939 – already after the start of World War II. The studies were interrupted by mobilization orders of 17 September and resumed on 22 November.

In early 1940, the school began the selection process for the fifth class – 110 men passed the first round of examinations; of them, 77 were selected for the second examination round in fall 1940. However, Soviet Union occupied Lithuania on 15 June 1940. The Lithuanian Army was ordered to not resist the occupation and was gradually transformed into the Red Army's 29th Lithuanian Territorial Rifle Corps. As the officers completed their first study year on 17 June, they were ordered to return to their units. The school's name was changed to remove the reference to Vytautas the Great and then it was abolished on 30 September. Many of the officers were later arrested and repressed by the Soviet NKVD.

== Directors ==
No.	Portrait	Commander	Took office	Left office	Time in office
1	Maksimas Katche	Maksimas Katche (1879–1933)	24 March 1921	29 July 1921	127 days
2	Leonas Radus-Zenkavičius [lt]	Leonas Radus-Zenkavičius (1874–1946)	29 July 1921	9 February 1928	6 years, 194 days
3	Vladas Skorupskis [lt]	Vladas Skorupskis (1895–1981)	9 February 1928	8 March 1929	1 year, 27 days
4	Bruno Štencelis	Bruno Štencelis	8 March 1929	14 August 1929	159 days
5	Stasys Dirmantas [lt]	Stasys Dirmantas (1887–1975)	14 August 1929	24 August 1933	4 years, 10 days
6	Petras Kubiliūnas	Petras Kubiliūnas (1894–1946)	24 August 1933	7 June 1934	287 days
7	Vladas Karvelis [lt]	Vladas Karvelis (1901–1981)	23 November 1936	7 June 1940	3 years, 197 days
8	Stasys Raštikis	Stasys Raštikis (1896–1985)	7 June 1940	30 September 1940	176 days

== Faculty ==
Some of the prominent faculty of the courses included:

- Vaclovas Biržiška, bibliographer
- Teodoras Daukantas, Minister of Defense
- Antanas Gustaitis, airplane constructor
- Vladas Jurgutis, banker
- Maksimas Katche, Chief of the General Staff
- Ignas Končius, physicist
- Petras Kubiliūnas, collaborator with Nazi Germany
- Juozas Papečkys, Minister of Defense
- Stasys Raštikis, commander of the Lithuanian Army
- Michał Pius Römer, attorney
- Kazys Škirpa, founder of the Lithuanian Activist Front
- Juozas Tumas-Vaižgantas, priest and writer
- Vincas Vitkauskas, commander of the Lithuanian Army
- Konstantinas Žukas, Minister of Defense
- Mykolas Kalmantas, military officer and chairman of the Lithuanian Riflemens Union

== Bibliography ==
- Tamašauskas, Kazimieras (31 August 2020) [2002]. "Aukštoji karo mokykla". Visuotinė lietuvių enciklopedija (in Lithuanian). Mokslo ir enciklopedijų leidybos centras.
- Žigaras, Feliksas (2007). "Lietuvos kariuomenės karininkų rengimo ir jų kvalifikacijos tobulinimo sistema (1919–1940 m.)". In Ažubalis, Algirdas (ed.). Karo pedagogika lietuvoje (1918–1940 m.) (in Lithuanian). Vilnius: Generolo Jono Žemaičio Lietuvos karo akademija. pp. 18–160. ISBN 978-9955-423-58-4.
- Žigaras, Feliksas (2008). Lietuvos kariuomenės karininkų rengimo ir jų kvalifikacijos kėlimo sistema 1919-1940 (PDF) (in Lithuanian). Vol. 2. Vilnius: Generolo Jono Žemaičio Lietuvos karo akademija. ISBN 978-609-8074-87-1.
