= Order of the Cross of Vytis =

Lithuanian presidential award

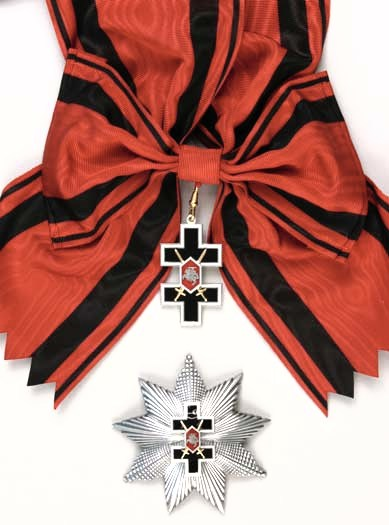
- Sash, badge, and star of the Order of the Cross of Vytis
- Type: State Decoration
- Founded: 30 July 1919
- Country: Lithuania
- Awarded for: Heroic defense of Lithuania's freedom and independence

Precedence
- Next (higher): Order of Vytautas the Great
- Next (lower): Order of the Lithuanian Grand Duke Gediminas
- Related: Medal of the Order of the Cross of Vytis

The Order of the Cross of Vytis (Lithuanian: Vyčio Kryžiaus ordinas) is a Lithuanian presidential award conferred for heroic defence of Lithuania's freedom and independence. November 23 is a holiday in honour of the Order of the Cross of Vytis.

== History ==
=== Interwar period ===
==== Rejected initial design ====
The order was first established on 30 July 1919 as the Cross for the Homeland (Kryžius "Už Tėvynę") when the newly established Lithuanian Army was engaged in the Lithuanian–Soviet War. The initial design was based on the Polish Virtuti Militari with an addition of crossed swords, but no such crosses were actually produced. At the time of the Polish–Lithuanian War, the design was criticized for following Polish traditions.

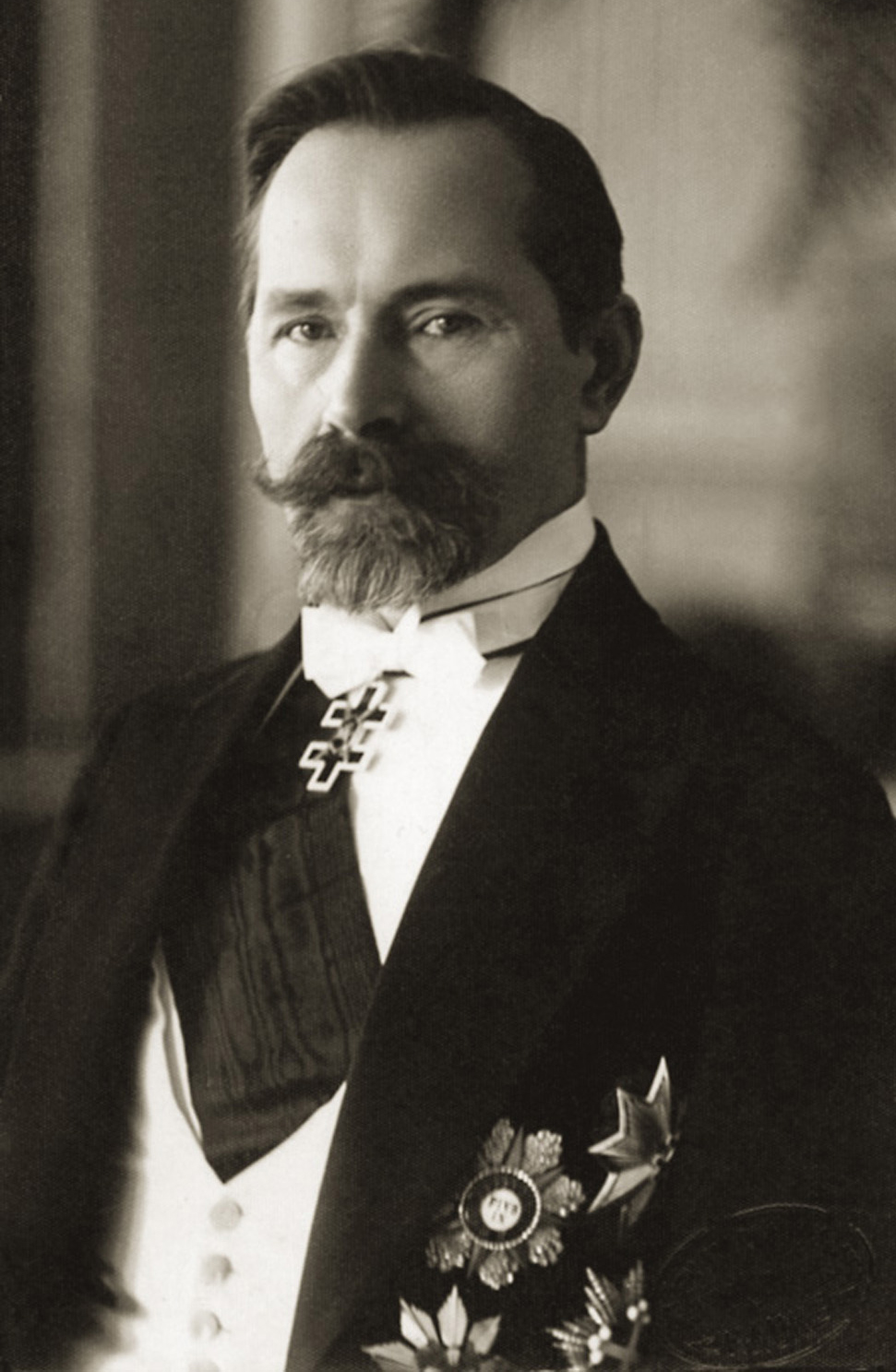
Antanas Smetona wearing the interwar Cross of Vytis, alongside other awards

==== New version ====
On 26 November 1919, the design was changed to the Cross of the Jagiellons, one of the varieties of the Cross of Lorraine found on the Coat of arms of Lithuania. On 3 February 1920, the name was changed to the Cross of Vytis. The order had two types: the first type had the crossed swords, and the second type was without the swords. Each type had three classes (the 1st class was the lowest, 3rd class was the highest).

=== After 1991 ===
The Order of the Cross of Vytis was the first state decoration of the pre-war Lithuania reinstated after the restoration of independence. The award was established on 15 January 1991. The first to receive the order were the victims of the Soviet attack on the Vilnius TV Tower and on the border post in Medininkai. Other recipients included leaders of the Supreme Committee for the Liberation of Lithuania, representatives of the world Lithuanian community, officers of the Lithuanian Armed Forces for contributing to the withdrawal of the Red Army from Lithuania, and Lithuanian policemen and prosecutors for distinction in combating organised crime. According to the Law on State Awards, adopted in 2002, the Order of the Cross of Vytis is conferred for heroic defence of Lithuania's freedom and independence, including armed and unarmed resistance to the 1940–90 occupations and service during the independence movement in 1988–90, and other acts of valor and bravery.

== Classes ==
The Order of the Cross of Vytis is awarded in five classes:

1. Grand Cross
2. Commander's Grand Cross
3. Commander's Cross
4. Officer's Cross
5. Knight's Cross
