= Antanas Rėklaitis =

Colonel of the Lithuanian Army

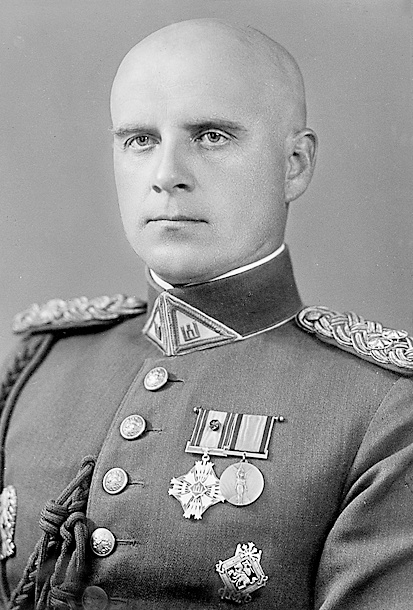
- Rėklaitis photographed with uniform of the Lithuanian Army and state awards
- Born: 24 December 1897; Daugirdėliai, Alytus County, Russian Empire
- Died: 30 April 1977 (aged 79); Breese, Illinois, United States
- Education: Veiveriai Teachers' Seminary (1918), War School of Kaunas (1919), Higher Officers' Courses (1924), Academy of the General Staff of Czechoslovakia (1933)
- Military career
- Allegiance: Lithuania; Nazi Germany
- Branch: Lithuanian Armed Forces (1919–1940); Lithuanian Auxiliary Police (1941–1942); Lithuanian Territorial Defense Force (1944)
- Service years: 1919–1944
- Rank: Colonel (Lithuania)
- Awards: Medal of Independence of Lithuania (1928); Officer's Cross of the Order of the Lithuanian Grand Duke Gediminas (1929); Officer's Cross of the Order of Vytautas the Great (1937)
- Other work: Lecturer

Antanas Simanas Rėklaitis (24 December 1897 – 30 April 1977) was a Lithuanian colonel, lecturer. In the interwar Lithuania, he was well known for his command of the Lithuanian cavalry units.

During the German occupation of Lithuania in World War II, Rėklaitis was Chief of the Staff of the Lithuanian Auxiliary Police in 1941–1942. Post-war, he emigrated to the United States.

== Personal life ==
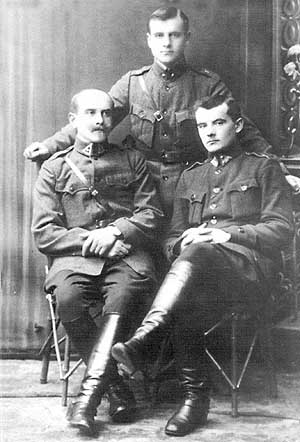
The Rėklaitis brothers: Vladas, Antanas, Mikas

Simonas, the father of Rėklaitis, was married with Teofilė and had nine children – five sons and four daughters. Simonas Rėklaitis told his children the history of his family even from the 17th century. According to his father, the Rėklaičiai family came from free peasants and never went to corvée. His parents were educated people, thus all their children graduated from studies. Three of them: Vladas Rėklaitis, Antanas, and Mikas Rėklaitis became officers.

Antanas Rėklaitis brothers colonel Vladas Rėklaitis and division general Mikas Rėklaitis also served in the Lithuanian Armed Forces, all three brothers were arrested by the Soviets following the Soviet occupation of Lithuania in 1940, however they were later liberated and emigrated.

== Early years ==
Rėklaitis was born on 24 December 1897 in Daugirdėliai, Alytus County, Russian Empire. In 1918, he graduated from the Veiveriai Teachers' Seminary which was evacuated to Ukraine.

== Interwar Lithuania ==
After returning to Lithuania, Rėklaitis worked as a teacher from January 1919 onward.

In December 1919, Rėklaitis graduated from the War School of Kaunas. In 1921, he participated in the Lithuanian Wars of Independence with the Polish Armed Forces in the section of Kalvarija–Lazdijai.

In November 1921, Rėklaitis was appointed Adjutant of the 1st Border Regiment.

In 1923, Rėklaitis participated in the Klaipėda Revolt.

In 1924, Rėklaitis graduated from the Higher Officers' Courses of Vytautas the Great.

Following his graduation from the Academy of the General Staff of Czechoslovakia in 1933, Rėklaitis served as Commander of the Hussar Regiment, and since 1934 as Commander of the Uhlan Regiment. Since June 1934, he was Chief of the Cavalry Staff.

In October 1934, Rėklaitis was transferred to the Third (Operations) Division of the Defence Staff Board.

In 1935–37, Rėklaitis was Commander of the Dragoon Regiment.

Rėklaitis lectured at the War School of Kaunas and the High School of Military of Vytautas the Great. He drafted the Statute of Cavalry Tactics.

== Occupations and World War II ==
Following the Soviet occupation of Lithuania in June 1940, Rėklaitis was fired from the Lithuanian Armed Forces in July 1940. He was arrested by the NKVD in 1941. He was liberated following the start of the Soviet–German War during the June Uprising in Lithuania in June 1941.

During the German occupation, Rėklaitis was Chief of the Staff of the Lithuanian Auxiliary Police in 1941–42.

In 1943, Rėklaitis rejected the proposal of the occupying Nazi German authorities to form a Lithuanian Legion of the Waffen-SS.

In 1944, Rėklaitis was appointed Chief of Division of the Staff of the Lithuanian Territorial Defense Force.

== Emigration ==
In 1944, Rėklaitis departed to Germany. In 1949, he emigrated to the United States and lived in Chicago.

Rėklaitis was one of the founders of the Lithuanian Union of Freedom Fighters and the Union of Lithuanian Soldiers Veterans Ramovė, and was the Secretary of the Board of the Ramovė Center. Moreover, he mainted contacts with the Supreme Committee for the Liberation of Lithuania. In 1963, Rėklaitis became involved in the activities of the Lithuanian Front as he was its fund secretary and executive vice-chairman. Rėklaitis collaborated with the magazine Karys, raised funds for its publishing. In 1962, Rėklaitis wrote the book Lietuvių Veteranų Sąjungos Ramovės pirmasis dešimtmetis, 1950–1960.

Rėklaitis died Breese, Illinois, at age 79 after suffering a heart attack at a wedding reception.
