= Vladas Rėklaitis =

Lithuanian colonel and lecturer

Colonel Vladas Rėklaitis
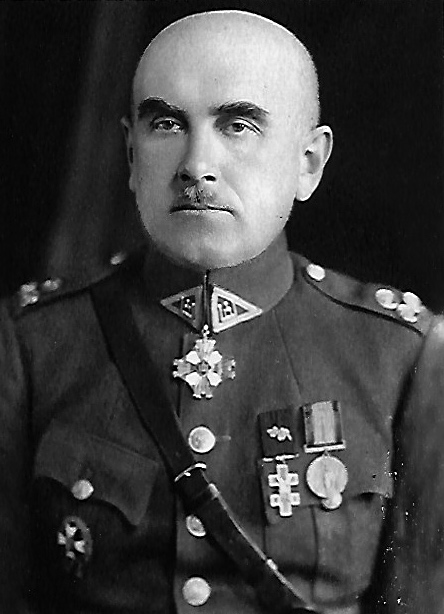
- Rėklaitis photographed with uniform of the Lithuanian Army and state awards
- Born: 18 January 1888; Daugirdėliai, Alytus County, Russian Empire
- Died: 4 April 1952 (aged 64); Chicago, Illinois, United States
- Alma mater: Higher Officers' Courses (1923)
- Military career
- Allegiance: Imperial Russian Army (1910–1919); Lithuanian Armed Forces (1919–1940); Lithuanian Territorial Defense Force (1944)
- Service years: 1910–1944
- Rank: Colonel
- Awards: Knight's Cross of the Order of the Cross of Vytis (1928); Medal of Independence of Lithuania (1928); Commander's Cross of the Order of the Lithuanian Grand Duke Gediminas (1928)
- Other work: Burgomaster of Ukmergė

Vladas Juozas Rėklaitis (18 January 1888 – 4 April 1952) was a Lithuanian colonel, lecturer of the Higher Officers' Courses, Burgomaster of Ukmergė.

== Personal life ==
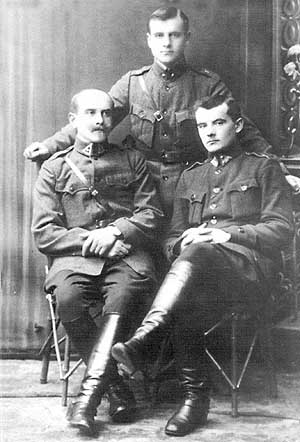
The Rėklaitis brothers: Vladas, Antanas, Mikas

Simonas, the father of Rėklaitis, was married with Teofilė and had nine children – five sons and four daughters. Simonas Rėklaitis told his children the history of his family even from the 17th century. According to his father, the Rėklaičiai family came from free peasants and never went to corvée. His parents were educated people, thus all their children graduated from studies. Three of them: Vladas, Antanas Rėklaitis, and Mikas Rėklaitis became officers.

Vladas Rėklaitis brothers colonel Antanas Rėklaitis and division general Mikas Rėklaitis also served in the Lithuanian Armed Forces, all three brothers were arrested by the Soviets following the Soviet occupation of Lithuania in 1940, however, they were later liberated and emigrated.

== Early life ==
In 1910, Rėklaitis was drafted into the Imperial Russian Army and in 1911 graduated from a military school. He fought on the front during World War I, and was wounded several times.

== Interwar Lithuania ==
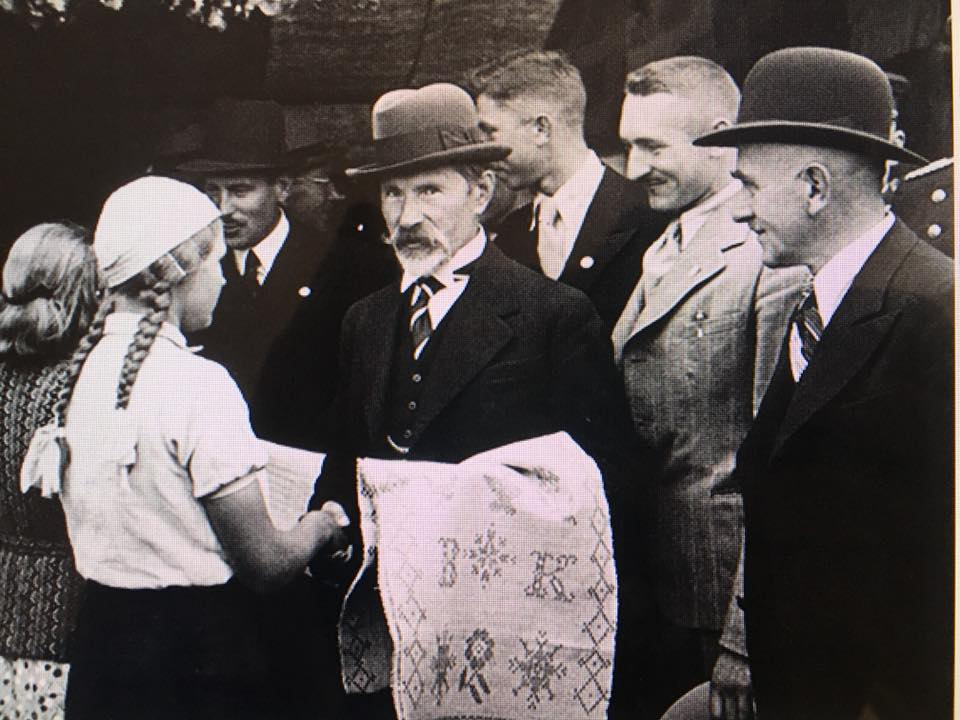
Rėklaitis, being burgomaster, welcomes President Antanas Smetona to Ukmergė in 1935

In February 1919, Rėklaitis returned to Lithuania and joined the Lithuanian Armed Forces.

In July 1919, Rėklaitis was appointed the commandant of the city of Šakiai and Šakiai County.

In 1920, Rėklaitis participated in the Lithuanian Wars of Independence with the Polish Armed Forces. In 1920–1921, he served as Commander of the Seventh Infantry Regiment, and from 1921 he was Commander of the Fifth Infantry Regiment.

In 1923, Rėklaitis graduated from the Higher Officers' Courses of the Grand Duke Vytautas the Great, and since 1926 was its lecturer.

In 1928, Rėklaitis was appointed Special Affairs Officer of the Ministry of National Defence of Lithuania.

In 1929, Rėklaitis went into reserve.

In 1931–1940, he was the Burgomaster of Ukmergė.

== Occupations and World War II ==
Following the Soviet occupation of Lithuania in June 1940, Rėklaitis was arrested in July 1940 and imprisoned in Ukmergė. He was liberated following the start of the Soviet–German War during the June Uprising in Lithuania in June 1941.

In 1944, Rėklaitis was appointed Commandant of the Lithuanian Territorial Defense Force in Ukmergė.

== Emigration ==
In 1944, Rėklaitis departed to Germany. In 1949, he emigrated to the United States, where he died in 1952.
