= Mikas Rėklaitis =

Lithuanian division general

Division general Mikas Rėklaitis
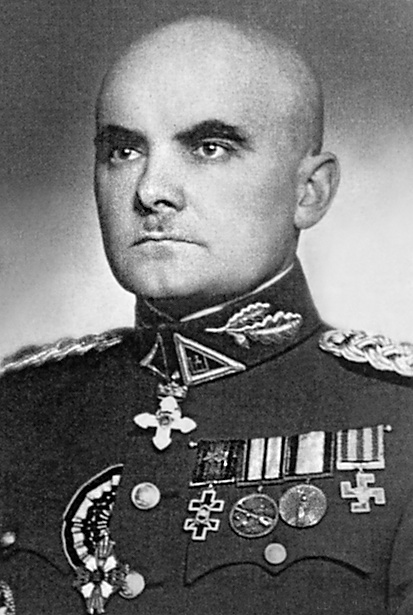
- Rėklaitis photographed with uniform of the Division General of the Lithuanian Army and state awards
- Born: 6 September 1895; Daugirdėliai, Alytus County, Russian Empire
- Died: 31 March 1976 (aged 80); Chicago, United States
- Burial place: Chicago, United States
- Alma mater: Veiveriai Teachers' Seminary (1915), Moscow War School of Alexey, War School of Kaunas (1922), Higher Officers' Courses (1930)
- Military career
- Allegiance: Imperial Russian Army (1916–1917); Lithuanian Armed Forces (1919–1940)
- Service years: 1916–1940
- Rank: Division general
- Awards: Knight's Cross of the Order of the Cross of Vytis (1919); Medal of Independence of Lithuania (1928); Latvian Liberation War 10th Anniversary Participants Medal (1928); Commander's Cross of the Order of the Lithuanian Grand Duke Gediminas (1928); Commander's Cross of the Order of Vytautas the Great (1937); Cross of Merit of the Aizsargi (1939)
- Other work: Provisional Government of Lithuania

Mikas Rėklaitis (6 September 1895 – 31 March 1976) was a Lithuanian division general. He was chief of supply of the Lithuanian Armed Forces.

== Personal life ==
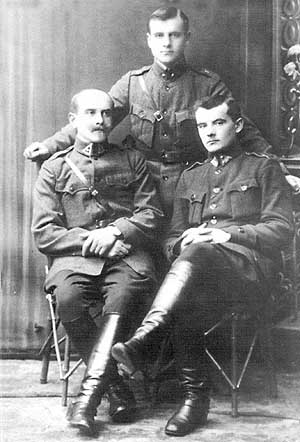
The Rėklaitis brothers: Vladas, Antanas, Mikas

Simonas, the father of Rėklaitis, was married with Teofilė and had nine children—five sons and four daughters. Simonas Rėklaitis told his children the history of his family even from the seventeenth century. According to his father, the Rėklaičiai family came from free peasants and never went to corvée. His parents were educated people, thus all their children graduated from studies. Three of them (Vladas Rėklaitis, Antanas Rėklaitis, and Mikas) became officers.

Mikas Rėklaitis brothers colonel Antanas Rėklaitis and colonel Vladas Rėklaitis also served in the Lithuanian Armed Forces. All three brothers were arrested by the Soviets, following the Soviet occupation of Lithuania in 1940; however, they were later liberated and first emigrated to Germany, later to the United States.

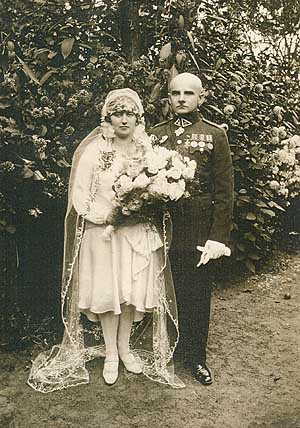
Rėklaitis with his wife Adelė

Rėklaitis married Adelė.

== Early life ==
Rėklaitis was born on 6 September 1895 in Daugirdėliai, Alytus County, Russian Empire. In 1915, he graduated from the Veiveriai Teachers' Seminary.

During the World War I, Rėklaitis was mobilized into the Imperial Russian Army in 1916 and fought on the front. He graduated from the War School of Alexey in Moscow.

== Interwar Lithuania ==
After returning to Lithuania at the end of 1918, Rėklaitis worked as the commander of the Alytus County Militia.

In January 1919, Rėklaitis joined the Lithuanian Armed Forces as a volunteer and participated in the Lithuanian Wars of Independence with the Russian SFSR in Kurkliai – Panevėžys operation and Zarasai operation, in 1920 – with the Polish Armed Forces. On 17 October 1919, he was awarded the rank of infantry captain and was appointed commander of a training company. On 20 October 1920, he was appointed commander of the battalion, and on 30 January 1922, he was elevated to a military rank of major.

In 1922, Rėklaitis graduated from the higher officers' courses at the War School of Kaunas and contributed to the drafting of the Statute of the Infantry Order (Part 2, 1922–23).

In 1923, Rėklaitis was appointed chief of staff of the First Military District.

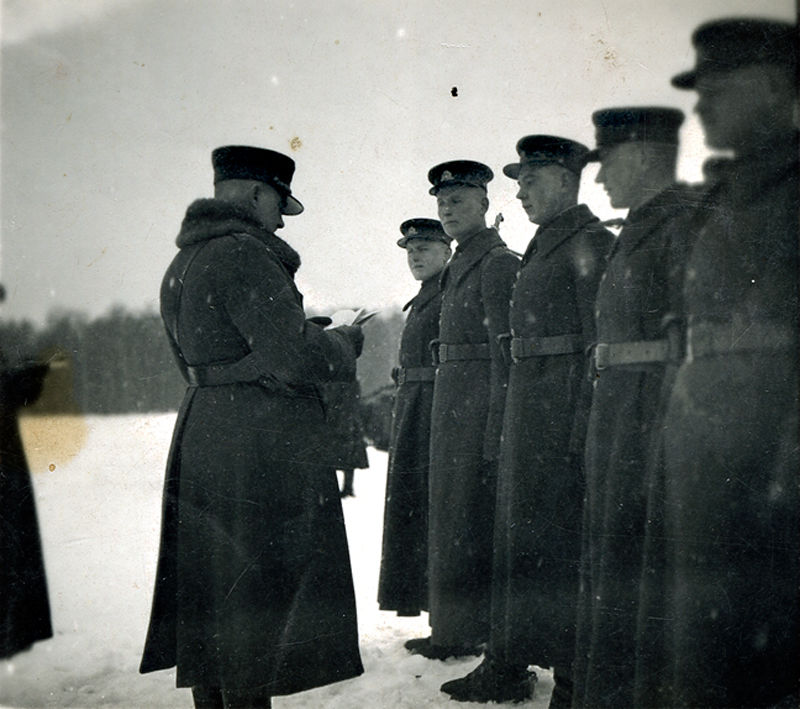
Rėklaitis inspects the complaints of the soldiers being a division general

Since 1927, Rėklaitis was the commandant of the Kėdainiai military area, later the commandant of the Kėdainiai County.

In 1930–35, Rėklaitis was the commander of the First Infantry Regiment. In 1930, he graduated from the Higher Officers' Courses. In 1935, he was appointed Commander of the Third Infantry Regiment.

On 23 November 1935, Rėklaitis was promoted to lieutenant general.

In 1938, Rėklaitis was awarded the military rank of division general and served as chief of supply of the Lithuanian Armed Forces.

== Occupations and World War II ==
In October 1939, Rėklaitis led the Lithuanian military delegation in negotiations with the Soviet Union on the deployment of Soviet troops in Lithuania. He was appointed Chief of the Lithuanian State Commission to coordinate all matters related to the placement of Soviet crews. In this position, Rėklaitis demonstrated tact and nobility. The Soviet-side had claims to expand its bases widely throughout Lithuania, as well as in Kaunas and Šiauliai districts; however, the Lithuanian State Commission was principled and achieved that the headquarters of the Red Army would not be located in Vilnius but in Naujoji Vilnia and that at least half of the entire Red Army forces would be kept in the Vilnius Region. In January 1940, Rėklaitis was appointed a representative of the Ministry of National Defence of Lithuania to maintain relations with the Red Army.

On 6–12 June 1940, Rėklaitis accompanied Prime Minister Antanas Merkys in Moscow; however, he was not allowed to participate in the negotiations of the Soviet–Lithuanian Mutual Assistance Treaty in Moscow Kremlin. Unaware of Vyacheslav Molotov threats to Merkys and the Molotov–Ribbentrop Pact, Rėklaitis did not immediately understand the real Kremlin's intentions.

Following the Soviet occupation of Lithuania, Rėklaitis was fired from the Lithuanian Armed Forces in June 1940. On the night of 11 June 1941, he was arrested by the NKVD and imprisoned in Kaunas. Rėklaitis's family was later arrested and taken away, while he met the first day of the war in the security cellars of Kaunas. He was liberated following the start of the Soviet–German War during the June Uprising in Lithuania.

Rėklaitis was appointed as a member of the National Defense Council and chief of staff of the Armed Forces by the Provisional Government of Lithuania.

== Emigration ==
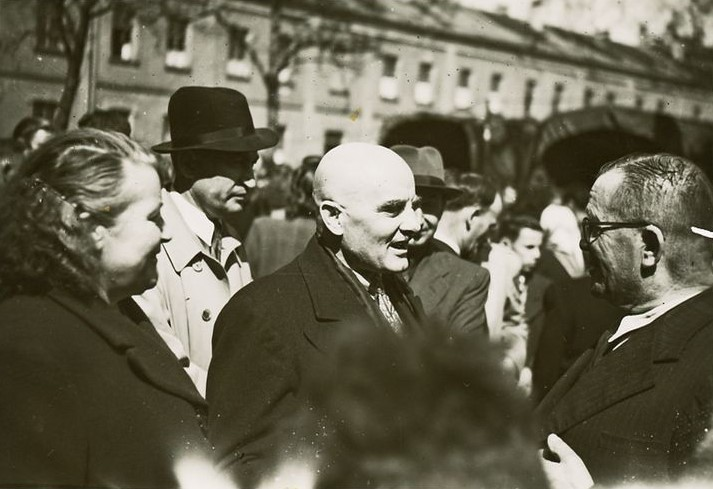
Rėklaitis leaves the refugee camp in Augsburg before his departure to the United States

In 1944, Rėklaitis departed to Germany, and in 1949, he emigrated to the United States.

Rėklaitis actively participated in the activities of the Lithuanian diaspora. He was vice-chairman of the Board of the Ramovė Center of the Lithuanian Veterans' Union, led the establishment of the Union of Freedom Fights Museum (1958), led the construction committee during the construction of the Lithuanian Freedom Fights Monument in Chicago (1960), and was chairman of the commission for the preparation of the book Kovos dėl Lietuvos nepriklausomybės, 1918–1920 (1 volume, 1972), and he collaborated with press of the Lithuanian Americans.

Rėklaitis died on 31 March 1976 in Chicago and was buried there.
