= Battle of Graużyszki =

1944 battle of World War II

- Part of Polish-Lithuanian Ethnic Conflict
Date	6 May 1944
Location	Graużyszki and Adamowszczyzna, Poland under occupation by the Nazi Germany(General Government) 54°19′41″N 25°50′28″E
Result	Polish victory

Belligerents
Home Army (Armia Krajowa)	Lithuanian Territorial Defense Force

Commanders and leaders
Adam Walczak (partisan)	Antanas Andriūnas

Units involved
8th Oszmiana Home Army Brigade; 13th Mołodeczno Home Army Brigade	10th LVR batalion; 308th LVR batalion

Casualties and losses
3 killed and 20 wounded	36 killed, 12 seriously and 26 lightly wounded, 224 taken prisoner
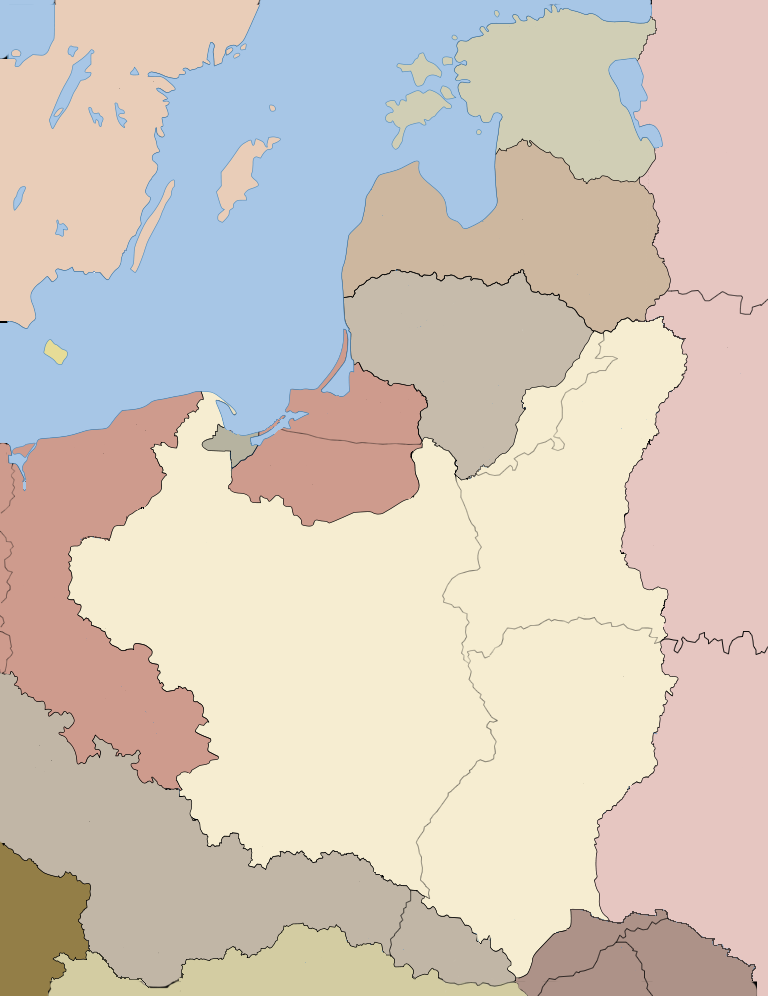
- Location within Poland

The battle of Graużyszki took place on 6 May 1944 near the Villages of Graużyszki, Adamowszczyzna and Sieńkowszyzna. Polish forces from the 8th and 13th Oszmiana Brigade of the Home Army (Armia Krajowa) under the command of Adam Walczak engaged units of the Lithuanian Territorial Defense Force under the command of Antanas Andriunas. The battle ended with a Polish victory.

== Background ==
Lithuanian–Polish relations during the interbellum period were strained since they both laid claim to the Vilnius Region. During World War II, these tensions were exacerbated by different allegiances: Lithuanian administration and paramilitary units were leaning towards Nazi Germany while Polish resistance waged an active partisan war against the Nazis. Thus from 1943, the Home Army launched attacks on Lithuanian police garrisons. One of these attacks took place at the end of 1943 on Turgiele and Taboryszki, where Polish units attacked the Lithuanian police post and took control of the villages. One of the units fighting against the Lithuanian Auxiliary Police, was Romuald Raj's unit in the 3rd Wilno Brigade. His unit on 13 March attacked the Lithuanian police garrison in Graużyszki and after a short fight the poles captured the village. The Lithuanians lost 1 man and 28 were taken captive.

In late April and early May 1944, the German authorities decided to transfer a significant part of the police duties in Lithuania to the newly created LTDF formation, which was ordered to initiate a wide anti-partisan operation against the Polish and Soviet partisans in the area. Polish units were commanded to not attack the Lithuanian Territorial Defense Force; however, the Lithuanians attacked Polish villages. On May 4, the LTDF launched an assault on the village of Paulava, murdering the local Polish community; however, the Unit of "Szczerbiec" attacked the Lithuanian force, killing 12 people and executing 8 after the battle, including the commander Vytautas Narkevicius.

== Course of battle ==
On 6 May, the 10th Battalion of the Plechavicius Corps, under the command of Major Antanas Andriunas, arrived at the village of Senkovshchina from the Oszmiana-Graużyszki route and began murdering civilian residents and burning buildings for no reason. Lieutenant "Żagla's" platoon from the 8th Brigade, going to the aid of the murdered village struck with fury at the Lithuanians. The Lithuanians, being outnumbered, could not stop the assault and began to retreat. The brigade, supported in part by forces of the 13th Brigade under the command of Adam Walczek "Nietoperz", completely smashed the Lithuanian company of the 308th Battalion.

== Aftermath ==
According to sources the Lithuanians lost a total of 36 soldiers, 12 seriously and 26 lightly wounded, and 224 were taken prisoner. Polish losses amounted to 3 killed and 20 wounded. According to Hubert Kuberski, 37 Lithuanians were killed, 60 were wounded and 30 were taken prisoner. After the battle, an investigation was conducted and the culprits for the murder of 8 Polish peasants were determined. These individuals were executed.

In just two battles near Pawłowo and Graużysszki half of the LTDF battalions were dispersed. Only two battles were fought between Home Army and LTDF units after this, in Koniawa (inconclusive) and Murowana Oszmianka where the Poles won and dispersed the final LTDF units fighting against them. Only a few skirmishes and two massacres where fought between Polish and Lithuanian forces in World War II. The fighting was only interrupted by Soviet intervention.
