= Erikas Pempė =

Lithuanian educator, physical-education specialist (1911-1990)

Pempe upon arrival in the USA, 1949

Erikas Pempė (20 January 1911 – 15 February 1990), also known as Erich Pempė and later Eric Pempe, was a Lithuanian educator, physical-education specialist, and reserve army officer from the Klaipėda Region (German: Memelland) of Lithuania. He taught physical education at the Vytautas Magnus Gymnasium in Klaipėda and later worked at schools and higher-education institutions elsewhere in Lithuania. In 1944 he served as an interpreter and officer for special duties with the Vilnius Command of the Lithuanian Territorial Defense Force (Lietuvos vietinė rinktinė). As the Red Army advanced into Lithuania later that year, he fled westward with his family. He lived as a displaced person in Germany before immigrating to the United States in 1949.

Pempė's life and writings provide a personal perspective on the political and cultural tensions of the interwar Klaipėda Region, a former German territory incorporated into Lithuania in 1923 and administered autonomously until Nazi Germany annexed it in 1939. (Note: Following World War I, the Klaipėda Region (Memel Territory) was separated from Germany and placed under Allied administration, administered by France. In January 1923, Lithuania organized and supported a staged “revolt” that brought the territory under Lithuanian control. The Allied powers subsequently recognized Lithuanian sovereignty, and the 1924 Klaipėda Convention established the region as an autonomous territory within Lithuania.)

Raised in a German-speaking environment but increasingly identified with Lithuania, Pempė experienced the region's competing national and political loyalties directly. These tensions were reflected throughout his own life, including in his language, education, citizenship, military service, and professional choices. His subsequent experiences of German annexation, Soviet occupation, and wartime displacement further reflected the wider upheavals that transformed Lithuania and other European border regions during World War II.

At some point after leaving Lithuania, Pempė wrote an autobiographical account of his experiences in the Klaipėda Region and Lithuania in the 1930s, focusing particularly on questions of nationality, citizenship, and identity. Written under the name John Winglap, it was published in English as A Reluctant Citizen: Making a Life in German-Occupied Memel and Lithuania 1932–1940 (2017) and in Lithuanian as Tapatybės kryžkelėje: Tarp vokiškumo ir lietuvybės 1932–1940 m. (2021).

== Early life and education ==
Pempė was born on 20 January 1911 in Pagėgiai (German: Pogegen), then part of East Prussia in the German Empire, not far from Memel (present-day Klaipėda, Lithuania). His parents were Dovydas (David) Pempė, a blacksmith, and Berta Kasperaitytė. He was the youngest of six children. The family was Lutheran.

Pempė was raised in a German-speaking environment and received his elementary education entirely in German from 1917 to 1925. According to his memoir, he completed German elementary school at the age of 14 without knowing Lithuanian. Intending to continue his education at the Lithuanian Teachers' Seminary in Klaipėda, he attended Lithuanian-language courses to prepare for its entrance examinations. He was accepted at the age of 15, making him one of the youngest applicants admitted to the seminary.

Pempė graduated from the Klaipėda Teachers' Seminary in the spring of 1932. Even before completing his final examinations and formally receiving his diploma, he received his first teaching assignment in March at a Lithuanian-language school in Klaipėda. In his memoir, Pempė attributed the appointment to his examination performance: he had received marks equivalent to "very good" in all of his written examinations, including Lithuanian. He subsequently taught at the Kristijonas Donelaitis Primary School in Klaipėda.

In September 1932, Pempė was called up for compulsory military service in the Lithuanian Army. He chose to fulfill his military obligation through officer training at the Military School in Kaunas. On 15 September 1933, he was commissioned a reserve junior lieutenant in communications.

Following his military service, Pempė returned to teaching in the Klaipėda Region, working at the Paleičiai and Plikiai primary schools.

On 1 July 1934, he began studying at the Higher Physical Education Courses in Kaunas, a university-level institution for the training of physical-education specialists. He studied there until 15 September 1936. His diploma work was entitled Mokyklinė mankšta Austrijoje ("School Gymnastics in Austria").

From 1936 to 1938, Pempė continued his professional specialization abroad on a Lithuanian state scholarship. His military-officer biography records that he spent a semester each at higher schools of physical education in Vienna, Stockholm, and Amsterdam. During his studies in Sweden in 1936, Pempė encountered orienteering and later introduced the activity into his physical-education teaching in Lithuania, organizing monthly orienteering competitions for his pupils. His activities coincided with the beginnings of orienteering in Lithuania.

== Teaching career in Klaipėda ==
On 1 April 1938, Pempė began working as a physical-education teacher at the Vytautas Magnus Gymnasium in Klaipėda.

Historian and pedagogue Albertas Juška described Pempė as a Lithuanian Army reserve officer and a physical-education teacher who was well liked by his pupils. Former pupil Vilius Ašmys similarly remembered him as a teacher who approached physical education comprehensively and was popular among students.

Pempė's approach to physical education differed from what he regarded as the prevailing emphasis on competitive results, elite athletic performance, and military-style exercises. He placed less importance on competition, believing instead that physical education should contribute to the development of the whole student, including fostering character traits such as independence, confidence, determination, and the ability to make decisions. His studies abroad, particularly his exposure to Swedish methods, reinforced this approach.

Pempė also organized student folk-dance groups, teaching Lithuanian, German, and Swedish dances. In his memoir, he recalled learning the Swedish dances while studying in Stockholm. He also directed a Lithuanian male choir and prepared music for school and community performances.

During his studies in Kaunas, Pempė participated in the sports activities of the Lithuanian National Youth Union Young Lithuania (Jaunoji Lietuva), including its volleyball team. In his memoir, however, he expressed discomfort with the politicization of sport and with placing victory above fair competition.

== German annexation of Klaipėda and displacement ==
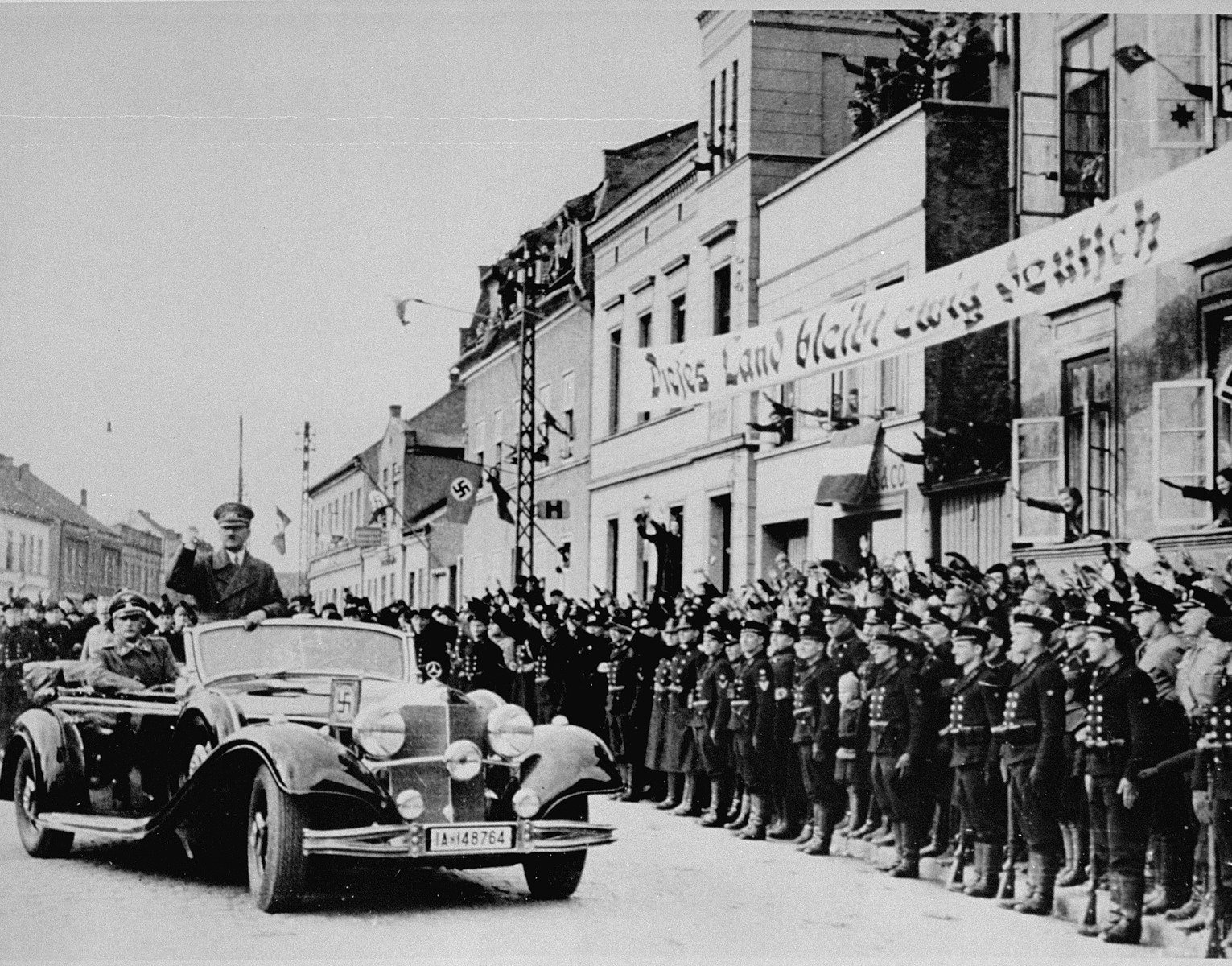
Adolf Hitler in Klaipėda, 23.03.1939

In March 1939, Nazi Germany demanded that Lithuania surrender the Klaipėda Region. On 20 March, German foreign minister Joachim von Ribbentrop presented Lithuanian foreign minister Juozas Urbšys with an ultimatum demanding the region's transfer to Germany. Lithuania acquiesced to the demand, and the transfer agreement was signed in Berlin on 22 March. Adolf Hitler arrived in Klaipėda the following day, an event Pempė personally witnessed.

According to his memoir, Pempė was offered the possibility of retaining his teaching position under German rule if he accepted German citizenship. Instead, he left the annexed territory for Lithuania.

Pempė also recalled being troubled by the changed attitudes of some Lithuanian teachers and community figures following the annexation. According to his memoir, some colleagues who had previously encouraged his Lithuanian identification and use of the Lithuanian language decided to stay in the region after the German annexation and would no longer speak Lithuanian with him. Pempė regarded this reversal as particularly striking given his own German-language upbringing and the effort he had made to learn Lithuanian. The experience intensified his uncertainty about the relationship between nationality, culture, citizenship, and political loyalty.

The annexation also displaced the Vytautas Magnus Gymnasium where Pempė was still working. The school initially moved from Klaipėda to Kretinga, then to Šventoji, and eventually settled in Palanga under the name Šventoji Vytautas Magnus Gymnasium.

Interned Polish soldiers in Palanga, 02.11.1939

Pempė continued teaching at the school when it finally relocated to Palanga. The contemporaneous student publication Birutės tėviškė identified him as the teacher supervising student sports and as a teacher of gymnastics and military preparedness. The May 1940 issue reported that about 80 of the 540 students who had attended the gymnasium in Klaipėda were studying at the relocated school in Palanga, which had a total enrollment of approximately 250.

Following the outbreak of World War II in September 1939, Pempė encountered Polish military personnel who had fled Poland and were subsequently interned in Palanga. In his memoir, he recalled seeing soldiers and officers moving around the resort in groups and frequenting local coffee houses during the autumn of 1939 and winter of 1940.

== Pasvalys and the first Soviet occupation ==
Soviets enter Pasvalys, 17.06.1940

On 1 April 1940, Pempė was appointed a junior teacher at the Petras Vileišis State Gymnasium in Pasvalys. Birutės tėviškė reported his transfer from the school in Palanga to Pasvalys. Pempė had joined the Lithuanian Riflemen's Union in 1939, and, effective 15 April 1940, he was appointed commander of the gymnasium's Riflemen's unit.

Pempė was living and working in Pasvalys when Soviet forces entered Lithuania in June 1940. In his memoir, he described watching Red Army tanks pass through the town and seeing a group of young people greeting the Soviet soldiers. He was disturbed both by the welcome given to the troops and by the absence of Lithuanian military resistance.

Pempė remained employed at the Pasvalys gymnasium during the first months of Soviet occupation. Effective 1 September 1940, he left the school at his own request and was appointed a junior teacher at the Vilnius IV Mixed Secondary School and the Vilnius VIII Polish Secondary School.

== Life in German-occupied Vilnius ==
Following the German invasion of the Soviet Union and the occupation of Lithuania in June 1941, Pempė continued his teaching career in Vilnius. During the German occupation, he taught at the Vilnius Pedagogical Institute and Vilnius University, with his teaching including physical education and German. He also taught German at the Kunigaikštienė Birutė Gymnasium in Vilnius.

Erikas and Sofija in the Alps, 1942

In 1941, Pempė met Sofija Fledžinskaitė in Vilnius. Through her mother, Aleksandra Zubovaitė-Fledžinskienė, Sofija was descended from the Zubov noble family; her father was Jonas Fledžinskas. She was studying physical education at Vilnius University at the time. They married on 3 April 1943, and their first child, Saulius, was born in Vilnius on 27 December 1943.

On 17 March 1943, the German occupation authorities closed Vilnius University and other Lithuanian institutions of higher education in retaliation for Lithuanian resistance to mobilization into an SS legion. Pempė's employment at those institutions thus ended. A month later, on 16 April, he took up employment with the Vilnius municipal fire and air-raid protection administration.

The following year, on 12 April 1944, Pempė was appointed to the Vilnius Command of the Lithuanian Territorial Defense Force as a translator and officer for special duties. His appointment ended on 23 May 1944, when the command was dissolved.

As Soviet forces advanced into Lithuania later in 1944, Pempė and his family prepared to flee westward. A former student, Dalia Sruogaitė, later recalled unexpectedly encountering him during this period and described him as deeply shaken. According to Sruogaitė, Pempė told her that a relative of his wife Sofija had been sexually assaulted and brutally killed by Soviet soldiers near Šiauliai. Pempė left Lithuania with his pregnant wife and their infant son Saulius, fleeing westward into Germany.

== Displaced persons in Germany ==
The Pempė family reached Germany during the final phase of the Second World War. Their daughter Rūta was born in the small town of Greiz, Thuringia, on 7 May 1945.

Pempė and his family continued south to Bavaria, which became part of the American occupation zone, where they lived as displaced persons for several years. His postwar displaced-person registration records identify his profession as a university lecturer, document his family circumstances and language abilities, and list his desired destination in 1945 as “Lithuania only when independent or USA.”

During the postwar period, Pempė worked with displaced persons and refugees in Germany. A 1950 account of his professional background recorded that he served as camp director and club leader at the Wunsiedel DP camp, as an employment officer with the United Nations Relief and Rehabilitation Administration (UNRRA), as director of YMCA schools at Wartenburg, and as a YMCA field secretary at Rosenheim.

Pempe's DP Record Card, 1945

At Rosenheim, he organized and administered a rehabilitation program for several hundred homeless boys who had become associated with American military units during the war and were described in the American press as "GI mascots."

== Immigration to the United States ==
Pempė and his family immigrated to the United States in 1949. The Lithuanian-American newspapers Darbininkas and Dirva listed Erich Pempė, Sophia, Rūta, and Saulius Pempė among displaced persons who arrived in New York on 9 August 1949 aboard the USAT General R. L. Howze. Their stated destination was Lynbrook, Long Island, New York.

After a short period in New York, the family moved to Helper, Utah, where Pempė became the city's director of recreation. Newspaper reports emphasized his background in education and physical education, his experience living and working in several European countries, and his knowledge of six European languages. Drawing on these experiences, he spoke to local organizations about postwar Germany and Poland, the United Nations, the Marshall Plan, and other European and international affairs.

Pempė later worked for about two years in the coal mines at Dragerton, Utah, before changing careers. The family later moved to Pocatello, Idaho, where he worked as a draftsman with the Westvaco Mineral Products Division. Pempė pursued technical studies through the International Correspondence Schools of Scranton, Pennsylvania, while maintaining his full-time employment. In 1959 he received a diploma after completing a course in mechanical engineering.

Sofija (Sophie) Pempė also developed a professional career in education and youth work. She had studied physical education at Vilnius University and later pursued postgraduate study at Idaho State College. She earned a master's degree in applied behavioral sciences from Whitworth College in 1976. In Idaho she became professionally active with the Girl Scouts, directing camping and outdoor-education programs and eventually serving as executive director of the Silver Sage Girl Scout Council. Contemporary newspaper reports document her direction of activities at Camp Tendoy and other outdoor programs for girls.

The Pempė family grew during their years in the United States. Sons John and Peter were born in 1951 and 1954, respectively. In 1960, the family moved to the Seattle, Washington, area where Pempė continued his technical career. Sophie continued her professional work with the Girl Scouts after the move. In 1961, Eric and Sophie adopted Werner, a four-year-old orphan from Germany who was related to Eric's family there.

== Memoir and views on identity ==
Questions of nationality, citizenship, and belonging form a central theme of Pempė's memoir. He distinguished between nationality and citizenship, regarding citizenship as politically changeable while viewing nationality as more enduring. He illustrated the distinction through his own experience: although born a German citizen and raised speaking German, he traced his family origins to Lithuania and described his gradual identification with Lithuania as a process of rediscovery rather than a simple change from one nationality to another. His account reflects broader patterns identified in scholarship on the Klaipėda Region, including the coexistence of German cultural influences with Lithuanian and regional identities.

This identification did not erase his German cultural upbringing. Pempė acknowledged that German was the language of his childhood and that German cultural influences remained familiar to him even after he had chosen Lithuanian citizenship and entered Lithuanian institutions. His position left him open to distrust from both sides: he recalled Germans regarding his Lithuanian orientation as a rejection of his German background, while some Lithuanians continued to regard him as a Memelländer whose German upbringing made his loyalty questionable.

Eric Pempe, c. 1990

Pempė also distinguished political allegiance from a sense of home. At one point he described Lithuania as his country but not his home, while elsewhere he wrote of having lost his homeland after the annexation of the Klaipėda Region. Nevertheless, he regarded Lithuania as having a claim on his loyalty. He believed that the education and professional opportunities provided to him by the Lithuanian state, including support for his studies abroad, created an obligation to contribute in return. His identification with Lithuania was therefore presented not only in terms of ancestry or sentiment, but also as a matter of personal choice and duty.

Pempė wrote his autobiographical account in English and in the third person, using fictionalized names and the author name John Winglap. His wife Sophie later stated that the work represented Eric Pempė's life through 1940, although she did not know why he had chosen the pseudonyms used in the manuscript. The publisher of the Lithuanian edition likewise identifies John Winglap as Erikas Pempė and presents the work as autobiographical.

The memoir was published posthumously in 2017, edited by his daughter Rūta Pempė Sevo, as A Reluctant Citizen: Making a Life in German-Occupied Memel and Lithuania 1932–1940. A Lithuanian translation was published in 2021 as Tapatybės kryžkelėje: Tarp vokiškumo ir lietuvybės 1932–1940 m. ("At the Crossroads of Identity: Between Germanness and Lithuanianness, 1932–1940").

== Death ==
Pempė died in Seattle, Washington, on 15 February 1990, less than a month before Lithuania declared the restoration of its independence on 11 March 1990.
