= Pagėgiai =

- Town
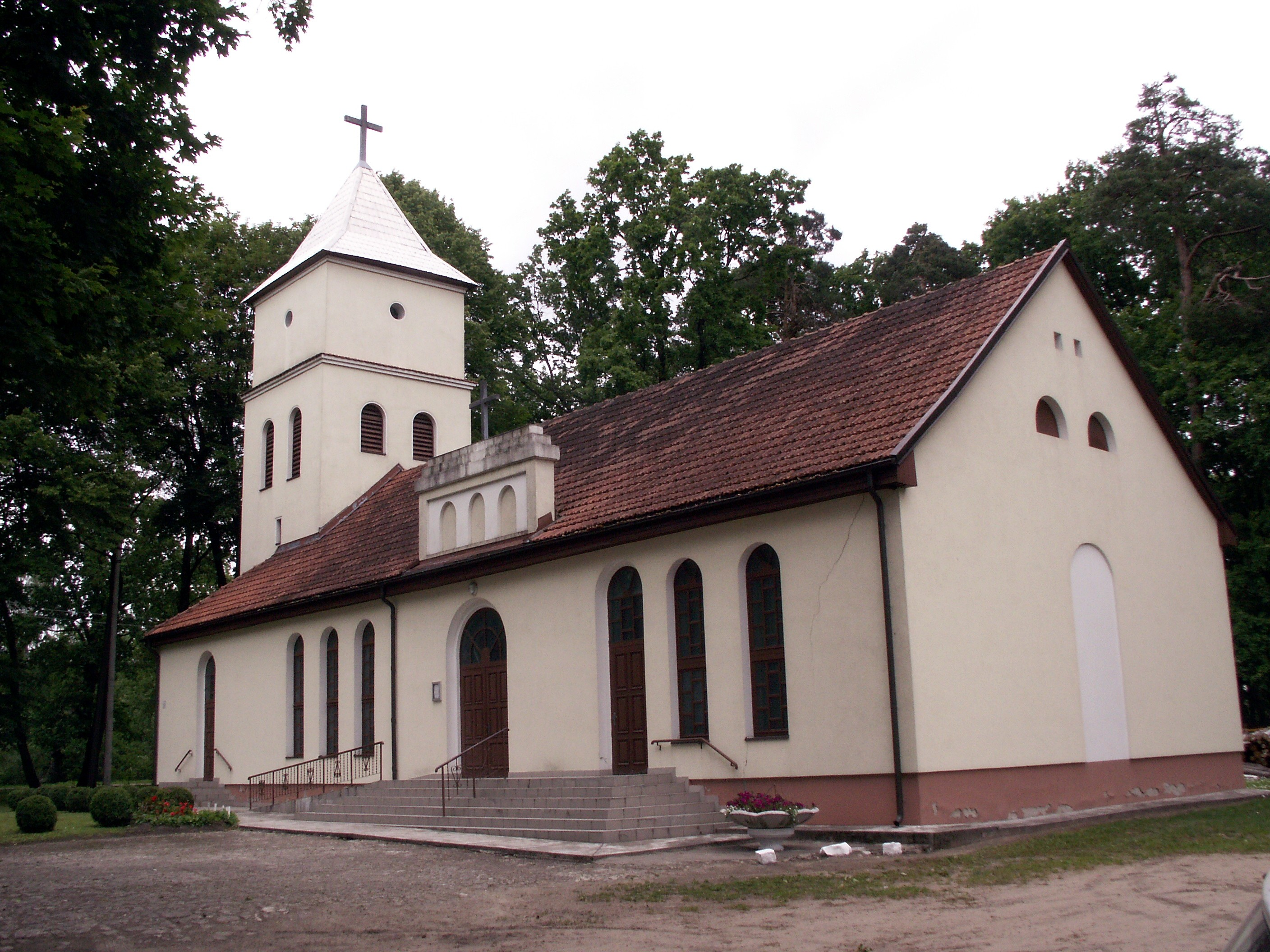
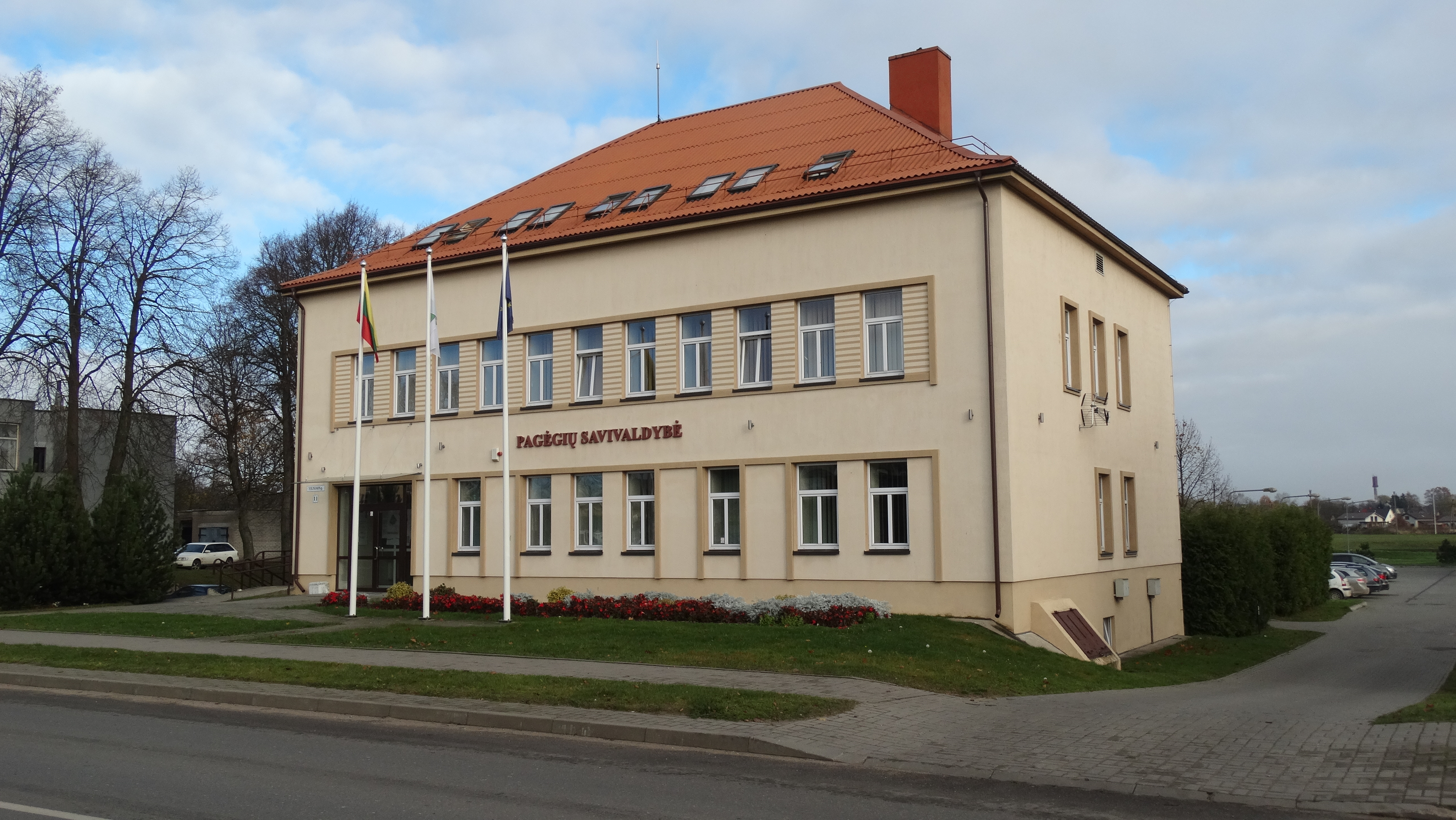
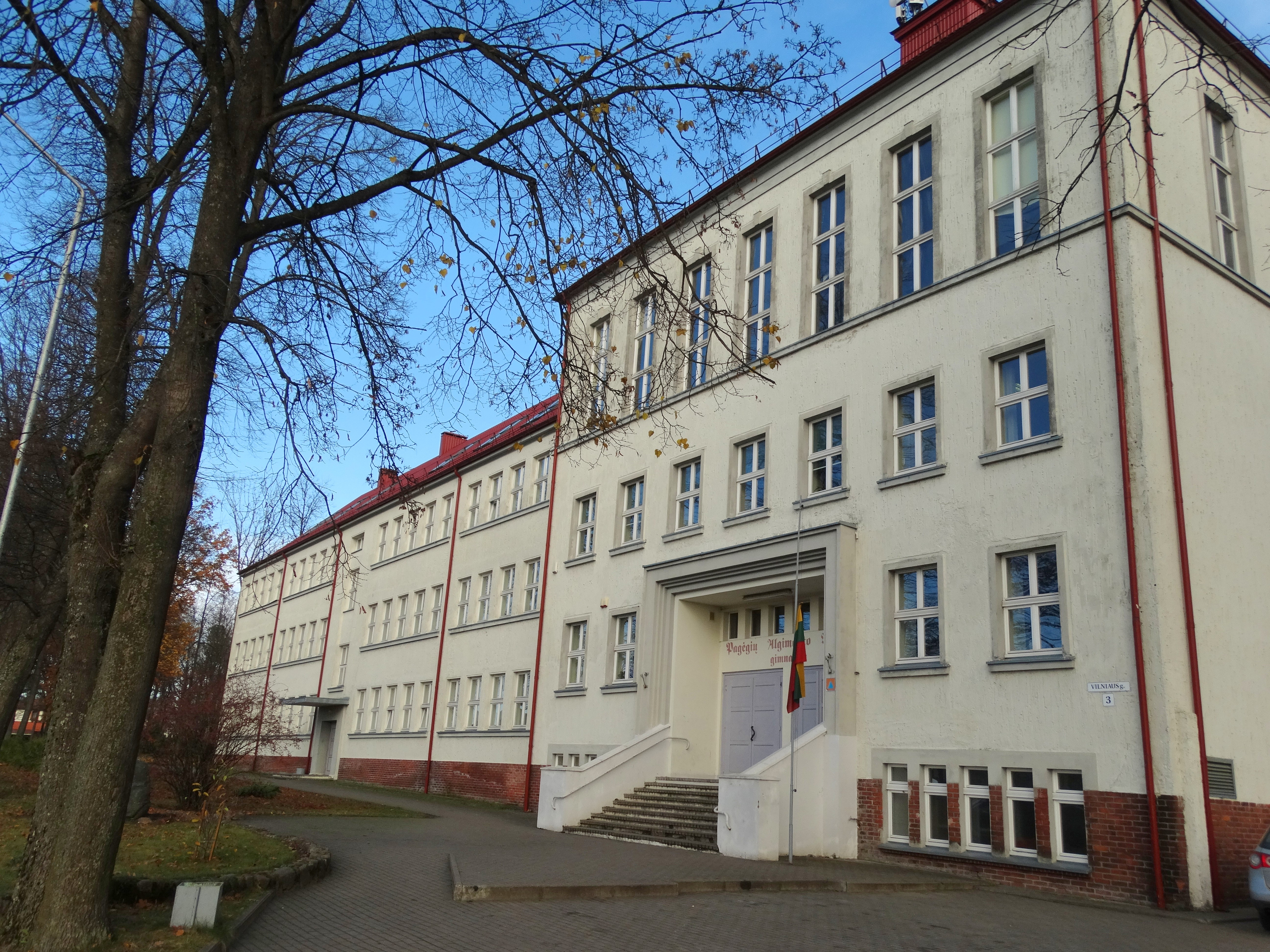
- Evangelical Lutheran Church Roman Catholic Church of the Holy Cross Pagėgiai Municipality Building Pagėgiai Algimantas Mackus Gymnasium

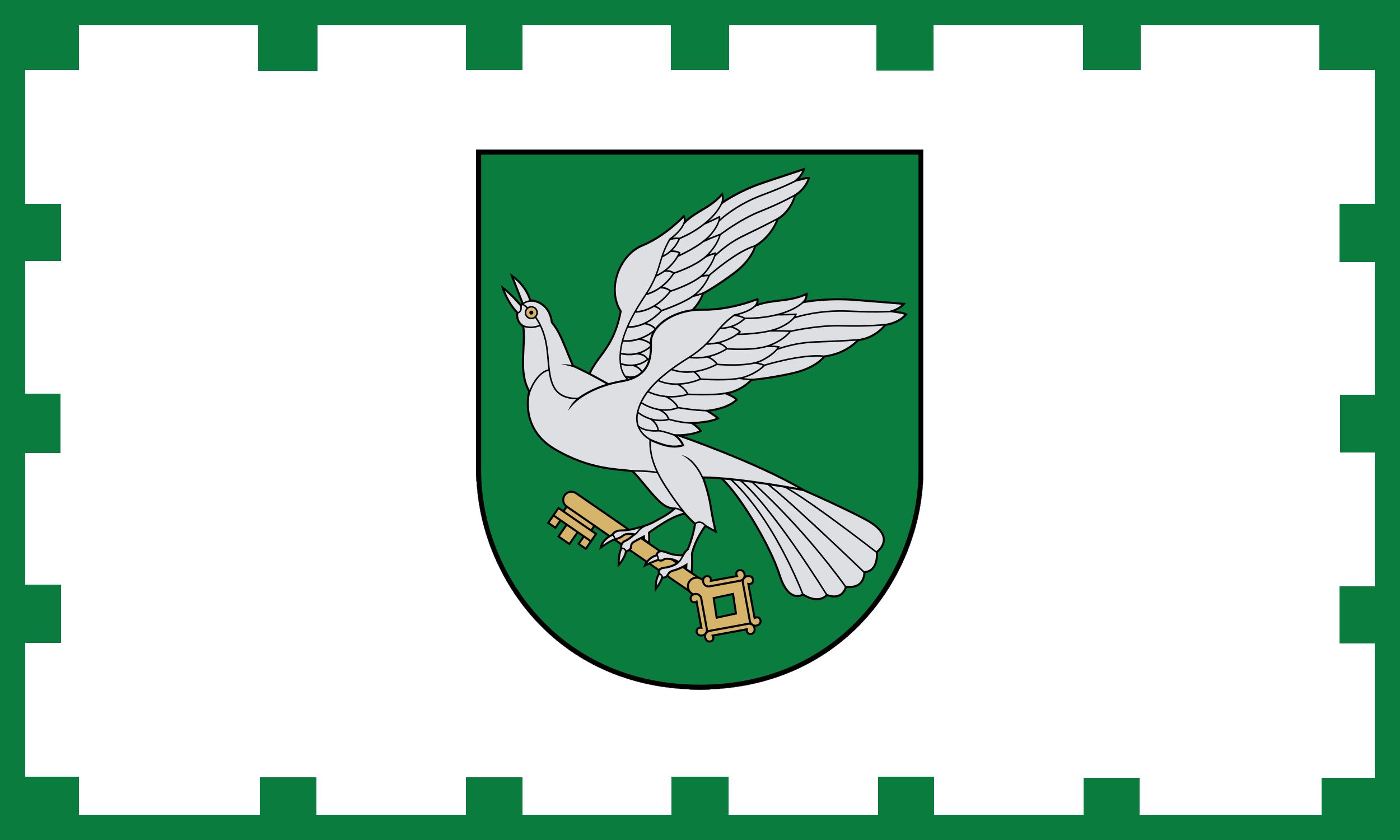
- Flag Coat of arms

- Location of Pagėgiai
- Coordinates: 55°8′0″N 21°55′0″E
- Country: Lithuania
- Ethnographic region: Lithuania Minor
- County: Tauragė County
- Municipality: Pagėgiai municipality
- Eldership: Pagėgiai eldership
- Capital of: Pagėgiai eldership
- Granted city rights: 1923

Population (2021)
  - Total: 1,576
- Time zone: UTC+2 (EET)
  - Summer (DST): UTC+3 (EEST)
- Website: http://www.pagegiai.lt

Pagėgiai (German: Pogegen) is a town in south-western Lithuania. It is located in the medieval region of Scalovia in the historic region of Lithuania Minor. It is the capital of Pagėgiai municipality, and as such it is part of Tauragė County.

== Name ==
The name of the town literally means "at Gėgė" (gegis: grove of alders, hay meadows, fields) and it is believed that the Gėgė river (also Gäge, Jäge) once flowed through the town.

== History ==
The settlement dates back to the Middle Ages. In 1454, King Casimir IV Jagiellon incorporated the region to the Kingdom of Poland upon the request of the anti-Teutonic Prussian Confederation. After the subsequent Thirteen Years' War (1454–1466) the village was a part of Poland as a fief held by the Teutonic Knights, and thus was located within the Polish–Lithuanian union, later elevated into the Polish–Lithuanian Commonwealth. From the 18th century, it was part of the Kingdom of Prussia, and from 1871 it was also part of Germany, within which it was administratively located in the province of East Prussia. In the late 19th century, the village had an almost exclusively Lithuanian population of 662, which was mostly employed in agriculture, cattle and horse breeding, butter production and fishing.

=== Interwar period ===
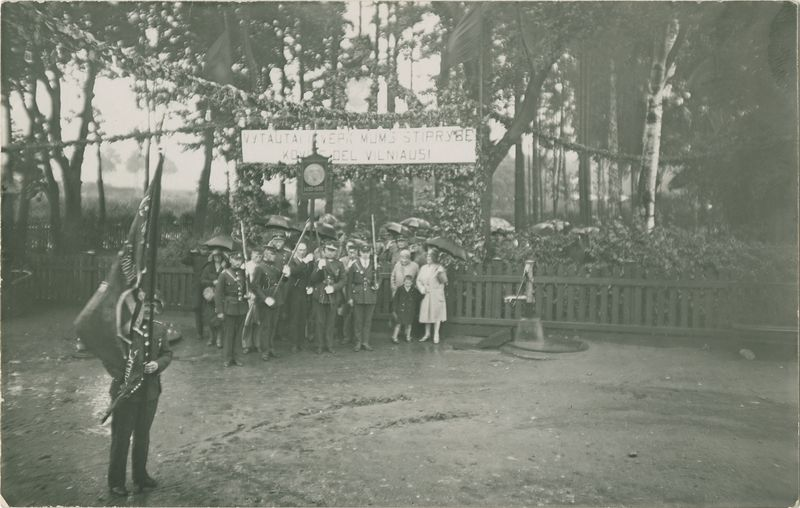
The 1930 procession of the painting of Vytautas the Great from Pagėgiai to Šilutė

When the Treaty of Versailles came in effect in January 1920, Memelland (Klaipėda Region) and the city, located north of the Niemen River were detached from East Prussia and placed under a League of Nations protectorate. In early 1921 attempts for a Customs Union between Memel and Lithuania were adjourned, mainly due to the de facto position of both State and government of Lithuania at that point in the eyes of the Western Allies.

The northern trans-Niemen parts of the East Prussian Kreis Ragnit and both Landkreis and Stadtkreis Tilsit, which had been established in 1818, as well as Gutsbezirk Perwallkischken were combined on 27 January 1920 into a new Kreis Pogegen, with Pogenen as the county town.

Achieving formal State recognition, Lithuania, on January 10, 1923, imitating the Polish seizure of Vilnius, made a surprise attack upon the Memel territory and city, still under League protection, forcing, with some street fighting, the League's French High Commissioner and his troops there to surrender and evacuate. The Allies and the League of Nations confronted with another fait accompli were forced to accept another humiliation.

Lithuania renamed the Memelland region Pagėgiai Apskritis.

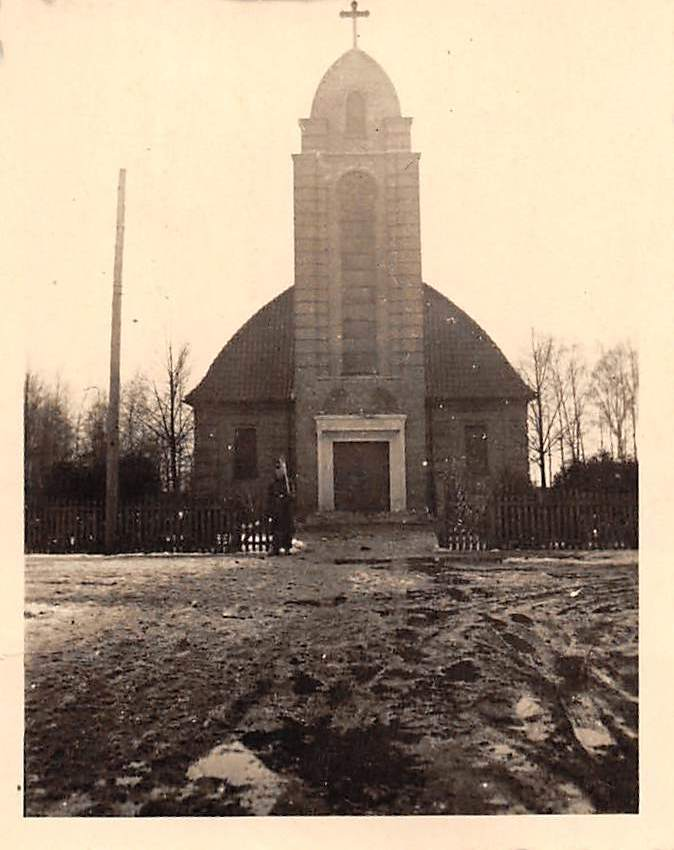
Holy Cross Church in 1941

The majority German population in Memel never ceased agitating for a return to Germany of both city and the Memelland, and after conferences between the German and Lithuanian government representatives in March 1939, an Agreement was reached and signed on March 23 transferring Memel and her territory back to German sovereignty. The former name "Landkreis Pogegen" was resumed. It consisted of 164 Landgemeinden with less than 2,000 inhabitants, and 34 Gutsbezirke. The largest community was Schmalleningken with a pop. of 1,700. Pogegen and the community of Wischwill had 1,400 each.

Landkreis Pogegen was dissolved on 1 October 1939 in order to re-unite the area with the larger cities south of Niemen river, and structures similar to pre-1920 were established.

During World War II, the Germans operated a subcamp of the Stalag I-D prisoner-of-war camp for Allied POWs in the town until 1943, and the Oflag 53 prisoner-of-war camp for Allied officers from 1943 to 1945.

=== After World War II ===
When Lithuania was occupied by the Soviet Union for the second time in 1944 and the Subdivisions of Lithuania were changed into that of districts, Pagėgiai became one of only a few towns that were interwar apskritis capitals which did not become district capitals. When the municipality reform took place in independent Lithuania in 2000, Pagėgiai municipality was carved out of Šilutė district and thus Pagėgiai became the capital of an administrative unit again.

The coat of arms of the town and the municipality depicts a bird with a key, which symbolises the border nature of the area (now with Kaliningrad Oblast of Russia). A Lithuanian border guard unit is stationed in Pagėgiai.

=== Notable people ===
- Erikas Pempė (1911–1990), Lithuanian educator, physical-education specialist, and reserve army officer

== Twin towns – sister cities ==
Pagėgiai is twinned with:

- Bad Iburg, Germany
- Iława, Poland
- Kose Parish, Estonia
- Lomma, Sweden
- Zbarazh, Ukraine

Former twin towns and friendly towns (until 2022):

- Kaliningrad, Russia
- Sovetsk/Tilsit, Russia
