= Administrative divisions of Lithuania =

Lithuania is a country in the Baltic region of Europe.

== Grand Duchy of Lithuania (1251–1569) ==
In the earliest stages of the formation of the Lithuanian state, the area included several "lands" (Lithuanian: plural – žemės, singular – žemė), such as Nalšia, Deltuva and Lietuva (as well as others), each ruled by a regional duke. When King Mindaugas (r. 1251–1263) unified the state, he killed, expelled, or subjugated most of the regional dukes. The lands were either added to the new ruler's domain or granted to members of his family.

As the Grand Duchy of Lithuania expanded into Slavic lands, title to the acquired principalities was given to the Grand Duke's offspring or to others of his relatives. For example, Mindaugas granted Black Ruthenia with its center in Navahrudak to his son Vaišvilkas, Grand Duke Gediminas (1316–1341) sent his brother Teodoras to Kiev. This system had major disadvantages: the principalities remained semi-independent with loose ties to the central government. Rulers of these principalities could operate as powerful rivals to the Grand Duke, a situation that led to frequent power-struggles.

In early-15th century Grand Duke Vytautas the Great (r. 1392–1430) initiated administrative reforms. He replaced regional dukes and princes with trustworthy nobles who depended on the favor of the Grand Duke. This marked the rise of Lithuanian nobility. In 1413 the Lithuanians and the Poles signed the Union of Horodło; Vilnius and Trakai Voivodeships formed in ethnic Lithuanian lands, copying the Polish system. The Eldership of Samogitia had a special semi-autonomous status. Former Slavic principalities and duchies largely preserved their old political, social, administrative features; they slowly became incorporated into the administration of the Grand Duchy. The Kiev Voivodeship was established in 1471, five other voivodeships were set up between 1504 and 1514. The Smolensk Voivodeship, the largest of all, was established in 1508, but was lost to the Grand Duchy of Moscow in 1514.

Voivodeships (Lithuanian: plural – vaivadijos, singular – vaivadija), ruled by appointed officials – voivodes, were further subdivided into powiats (Lithuanian: plural – pavietai, singular – pavietas).

Major administrative reforms took place in 1564–1566 in preparation for the second Statute of Lithuania of 1566 and the overhaul of the judicial system. The entire territory of the Grand Duchy, with exception of Samogitia, was divided into 12 voivodeships.

Rulers of the principalities of Lithuania in 1385. Jogaila Jagiełło is the Grand Duke.

Administrative divisions of Lithuania in 1430

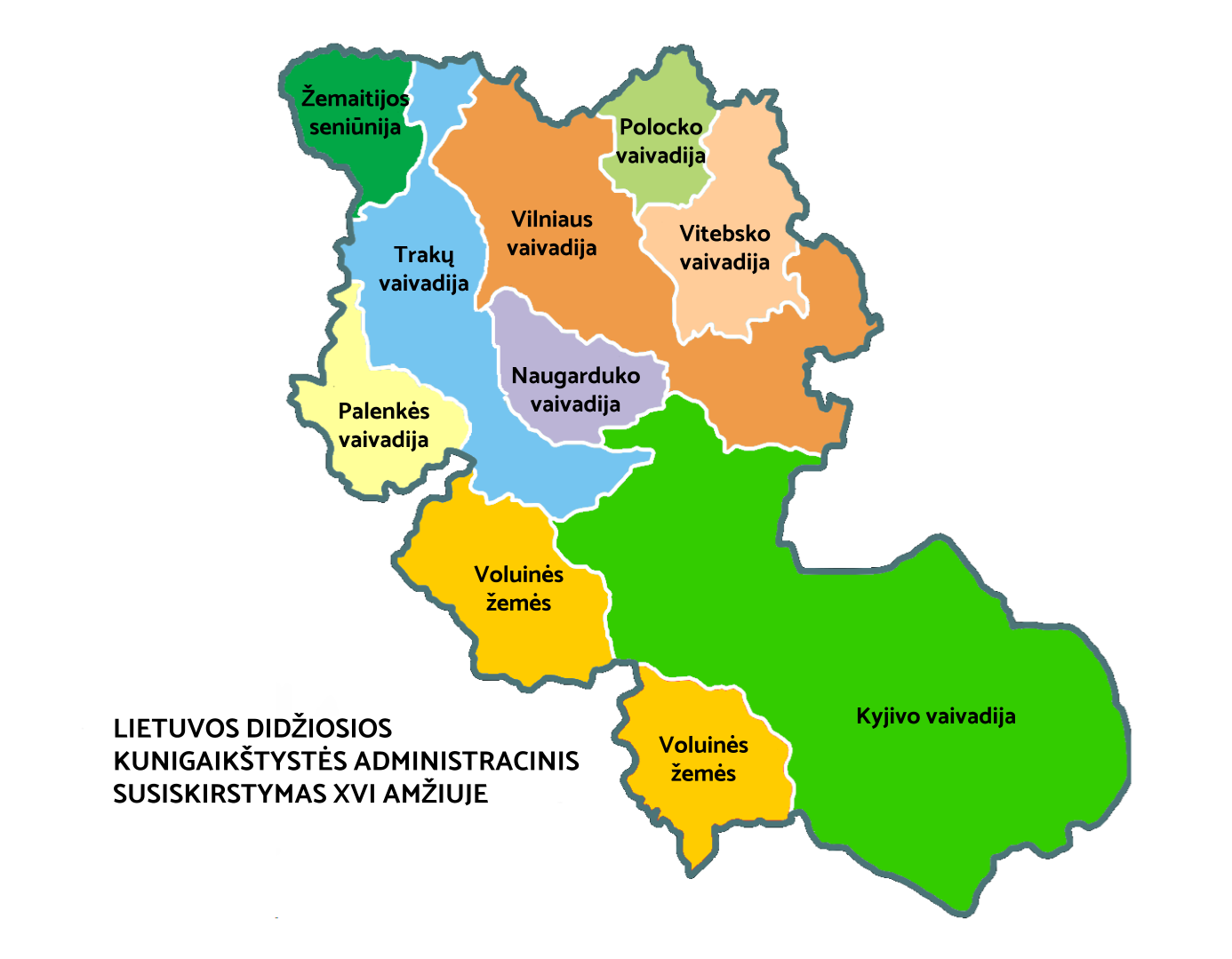
Administrative divisions of Lithuania in the first half of the 1500s

== Grand Duchy of Lithuania (1569–1795) ==
Just before the Union of Lublin (1569), four voivodeships (Kiev, Podlaskie, Bracław, and Wołyń) of the Grand Duchy of Lithuania were transferred to the Polish Crown by direct order of Sigismund II Augustus while the Duchy of Livonia, acquired in 1561, became a condominium (joint domain) of both Lithuania and Poland. This left Lithuania with eight voivodeships and one eldership:

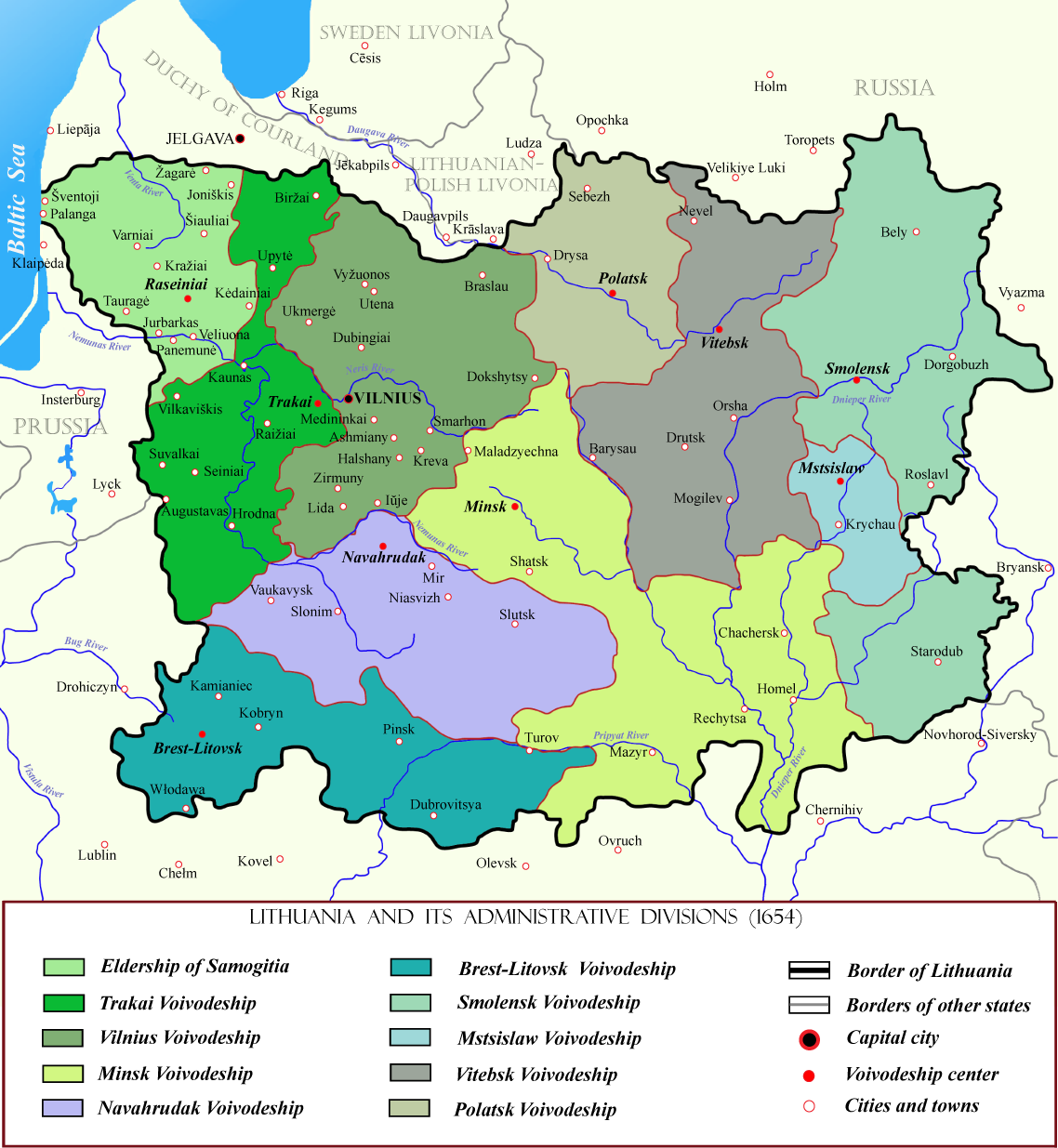
Map of the Grand Duchy of Lithuania and its administrative divisions in the 17th century

Voivodeship after 1569	Capital	Year established	Number of powiats	Area (km^{2}) in 1590
Brest Litovsk Voivodeship	Brest	1566	2 powiats	40,600
Minsk Voivodeship	Minsk	1566	3 powiats	55,500
Mstsislaw Voivodeship	Mstsislaw	1566	1 powiat	22,600
Nowogródek Voivodeship	Navahrudak	1507	3 powiats	33,200
Polotsk Voivodeship	Polotsk	1504	1 powiat	21,800
Samogitian Eldership	Raseiniai	1411	1 powiat	23,300
Trakai Voivodeship	Trakai	1413	4 powiats	31,100
Vilnius Voivodeship	Vilnius	1413	5 powiats	44,200
Vitebsk Voivodeship	Vitebsk	1511	2 powiats	24,600

After the Livonian War (1558–1582), Lithuania acquired the vassal state of Duchy of Courland with its capital Jelgava. This administrative division remained without any major changes until the partitions of the Polish–Lithuanian Commonwealth in the late 18th century.

== Russian Empire (1795–1914) ==
Map of Vilna and Slonim Governorates in 1795

Map of Lithuania in the Russian Empire (1867–1914)

Under the Russian Empire, the territory of the former Grand Duchy of Lithuania was divided into governorates (Russian: guberniya, Lithuanian: gubernija) and districts (Russian: uyezd, Lithuanian: apskritis). Such system was introducing in Russia during the reforms of 1775. The first governorates, Vilna Governorate (consisting of eleven districts) and Slonim Governorate, were established after the third partition of the Polish–Lithuanian Commonwealth. Just a year later, on December 12, 1796, they were merged into one governorate, called Lithuania Governorate, with capital in Vilnius. In 1801 Lithuania Governorate was split into Lithuania-Vilna Governorate and Lithuania-Grodno Governorate. Forty years later the word "Lithuania" was dropped from the two names and official maps of Europe. The territory of the former Grand Duchy of Lithuania became known as the Northwestern Krai. In 1843 another administrative reform took place, creating Kovno Governorate out of seven western districts of the Vilna Governorate. Vilna Governorate received three additional districts: Vileyka and Dzisna from Minsk Governorate and Lida from Grodno Governorate.

In 1837 Augustów Governorate was established in the territories of the Congress Poland, a state in personal union with Russia. Lithuanian Suvalkija was included into this governorate. After the January Uprising, Augustów Governorate was split into Suwałki Governorate and Łomża Governorate (see Administrative division of Congress Poland). This way most of the present-day territory of Lithuania fell into three governorates (Vilna, Kovno, and Suwałki). Two more governorates included some small Lithuanian territories. In 1819 a narrow coastal strip with Palanga and Šventoji was transferred to the Courland Governorate. This territory was acquired from Latvia after an international arbitration in 1920. Small areas in northernmost Grodno Governorate were given to Lithuania after it "joined" the Soviet Union in 1940.

In 1861, after announcing the abolition of serfdom, peasants acquired civil rights, among them a right to self-governmence. To facilitate such a right townships (Russian: volost, Lithuanian: valsčius) and elderates (Russian: mir, Lithuanian: seniūnija) were established. By the end of 1861 there were 1,479 elderates in 181 townships of Vilna Governorate and 1,033 elderates in 153 townships of Kovno Governorate. The elderates would elect an elder (Russian: starosta, Lithuanian: seniūnas) and representatives to a township council (Lithuanian: valsčiaus sueiga). However, these institutions had very little power and were dependent on the local nobles. The power was concentrated in the hands of governors, all of whom were appointed by the tsar.

== Interwar (1918–1940) ==
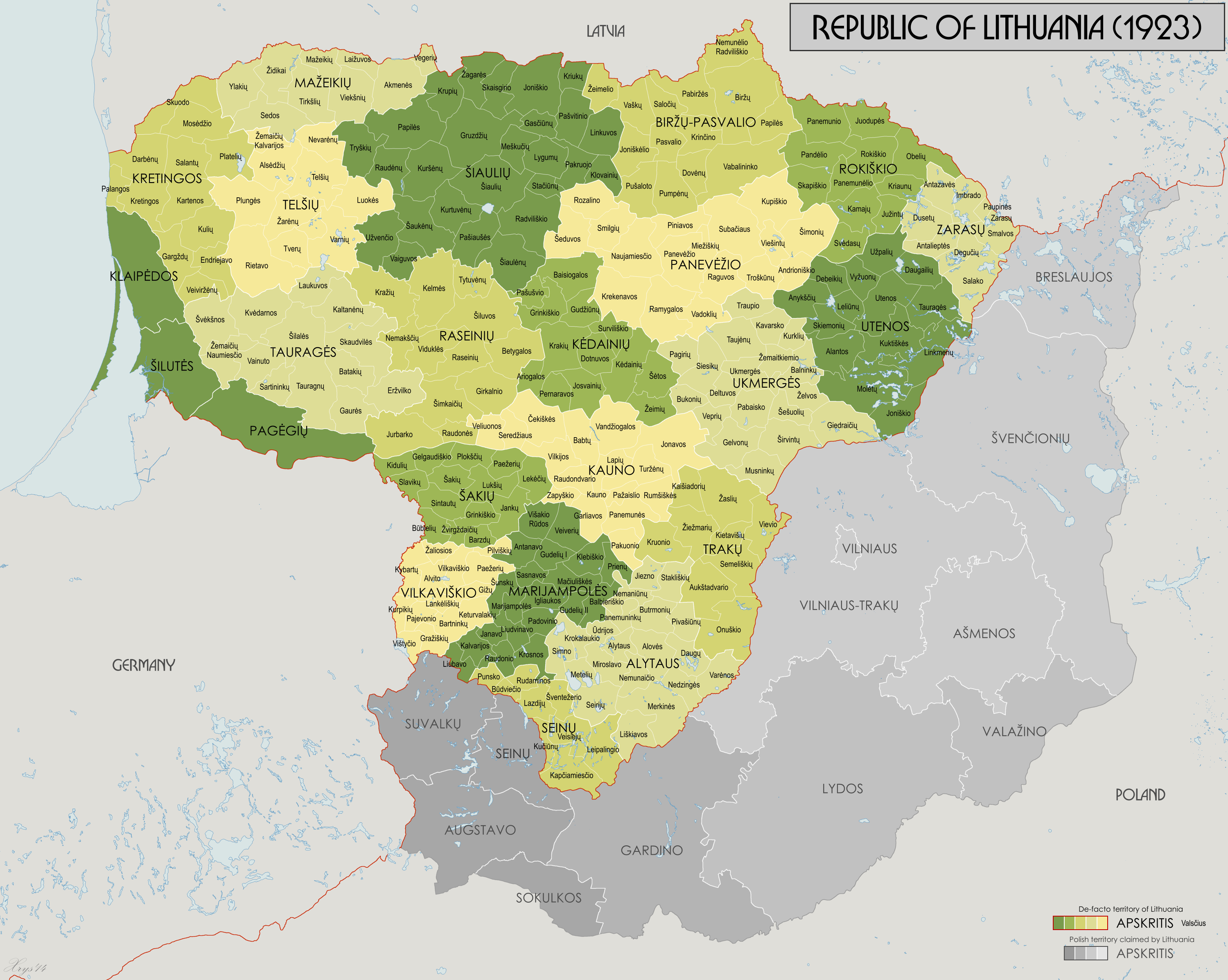
Administrative divisions in 1923

During the interwar period, Lithuania regained independence. The first law on administrative sub-units was passed on July 1, 1919. It declared that Lithuania was divided into twenty counties (Lithuanian: singular – apskritis, plural – apskritys). Several more counties (including Zarasai, Naujieji Švenčionys, Vilnius, Eišiškės, Lida, Ashmyany and Hrodna) were reserved for territories in the Vilnius Region, that Lithuania had claims to, but were under Polish or Russian control. Later on Suwałki county was lost to Poland, but Zarasai (also known as Ežerėnai) county was acquired. Two of the designated counties, Trakai and Sejny, had their proclaimed capitals outside the de facto borders of Lithuania and had their temporary capitals established at Kaišiadorys and Lazdijai. After the Klaipėda Region was acquired in 1923, it was divided into three counties (Klaipėda, Šilutė and Pagėgiai). That way the number of counties increased to twenty three and remained stable until 1939. According to a law passed in 1931 eleven first-class cities became independent of county administration and had their own government. In March 1939, after an ultimatum from Hitler, Lithuania lost the Klaipėda Region with its three counties. In October Soviet Union returned one fifth of the Vilnius Region in exchange for Red Army stations in Lithuania. Acquired Vilnius Region was divided into three counties (Vilnius, Eišiškės, and Naujieji Švenčionys). Therefore, at the end of 1939 Lithuania again had twenty three counties. Counties were further subdivided into townships (Lithuanian: singular – valsčius, plural – valsčiai). In 1933 there were 365 townships. The townships were further subdivided into elderates (Lithuanian: seniūnija).

The counties were governed by a county governor (Lithuanian: apskrities viršininkas), appointed by the Minister of Interior. Being almost the only link between the central government and the local population, governors were first responsible for a wide range of duties. They were to collect all property left by the retreating German army, organize local government, recruit local army groups, ensure security and stability in the county, etc. In 1920 they were also entrusted to preside over county police. In 1931, in an effort to centralize the government, county governors also became the chairmen of a three-member county governing body (Lithuanian: apskrities valdyba), an executive institution of a county council. That way power in a county became centralized in the hands of a governor. County councils (Lithuanian: apskrities taryba) were elected by local population for a three-year term. The number of representatives from a township depended upon the number of residents in that township.

These were the counties, their territory and residents according to the 1923 census:

#	County	Area (km^{2})	Residents	Notes
1	Alytus county	2,849	116,000	Part of this county was inside the Polish-controlled Vilnius Region; it was expanded in 1939
2	Biržai–Pasvalys county	3,268	115,186	Originally it was named just Biržai county
3	Kaunas county	2,618	191,364	
4	Kėdainiai county	2,403	93,514	
5	Klaipėda county	823	66,213	This county was in the Klaipėda Region, therefore administered by Lithuania in 1923–1939
6	Kretinga county	2,579	93,875	
7	Marijampolė county	2,199	103,749	
8	Mažeikiai county	2,070	75,404	
9	Pagėgiai county	938	38,613	This county was in the Klaipėda Region, therefore administered by Lithuania in 1923–1939
10	Panevėžys county	3,972	138,917	
11	Raseiniai county	3,087	113,294	
12	Rokiškis county	2,255	87,545	
13	Sejny county	1,263	38,207	Part of this county, including its capital, was under Polish control as part of the Suvalkai Region; a temporary capital of the county was in Lazdijai
14	Šakiai county	1,773	69,518	
15	Šiauliai county	5,714	198,015	
16	Šilutė county	643	36,099	This county was in the Klaipėda Region, therefore administered by Lithuania in 1923–1939
17	Tauragė county	3,351	116,435	
18	Telšiai county	2,601	85,233	
19	Trakai county	2,191	78,636	Part of this county, including its capital, was under Polish control as part of the Vilnius Region; a temporary capital of the county was in Kaišiadorys until 1939
20	Ukmergė county	3,199	126,309	Part of this county was inside the Polish-controlled Vilnius Region; it was expanded in 1939
21	Utena county	3,090	108,960	
22	Vilkaviškis county	1,412	86,909	
23	Zarasai county	1,314	46,442	Part of this county was inside the Polish-controlled Vilnius Region; it was expanded in 1939. It is also known as Ežerėnai county after an old name for Zarasai

== Soviet system (1940–1994) ==
Lithuania was occupied by the Soviet Union on June 15, 1940. However, due to ensuring World War II the authorities did not introduce major changes to the administrative divisions, just elderates were renamed to apylinkė. After the second occupation in 1944, the number of counties grew from 26 to 41: eleven counties were added in 1946–47 and four more were introduced in 1949. At the end of 1947 there were 37 counties subdivided into 320 townships that were further subdivided into approximately 2,900 apylinkės.

The entire interwar system was scrapped for the 10th anniversary of the first occupation. The new system matched that of other Soviet Republics. On July 20, 1950 Lithuanian SSR was divided into four regions (Russian: oblast, Lithuanian: sritis). The regions were further subdivided into 87 districts (Russian: raion, Lithuanian: rajonas): Kaunas Region with 23 districts, Klaipėda Region with 16 districts, Šiauliai Region with 24 districts, and Vilnius Region with 24 districts.

The townships were abolished and the districts were further subdivided into apylinkės. In 1984 there were 527 apylinkės in Lithuania. Both regions and districts were named after their capitals. Three exceptions were: Smėliai District had its capital in Ukmergė (also capital of Ukmergė district), Panemunė District – capital Garliava, and Klaipėda District – capital Gargždai. In addition to districts, there were five (Vilnius, Kaunas, Klaipėda, Šiauliai, and Panevėžys) region-administered cities (Lithuanian: srities pavaldumo miestas). They had similar rights as a district.

The regions were short-lived and on May 28, 1953, they were abolished, leaving the districts as the first-level administrative division. The number of districts was reduced several times, and in 1962 it settled at 44. The region-administered cities were renamed to republic-administered cities (Lithuanian: respublikinio pavaldumo miestas). The number of such cities grew to eleven in 1979. These cities became the city municipalities after the reform in 1994.

== Division of modern Lithuania (since 1994) ==
See: Counties of Lithuania, Municipalities of Lithuania, Elderships.

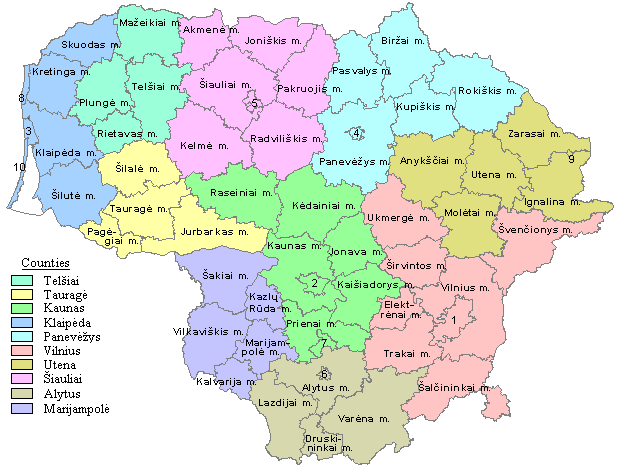
Counties and municipalities of Lithuania; 1. Vilnius, 2. Kaunas, 3. Klaipėda, 4. Panevėžys, 5. Šiauliai, 6. Alytus, 7. Birštonas, 8. Palanga, 9. Visaginas, 10. Neringa

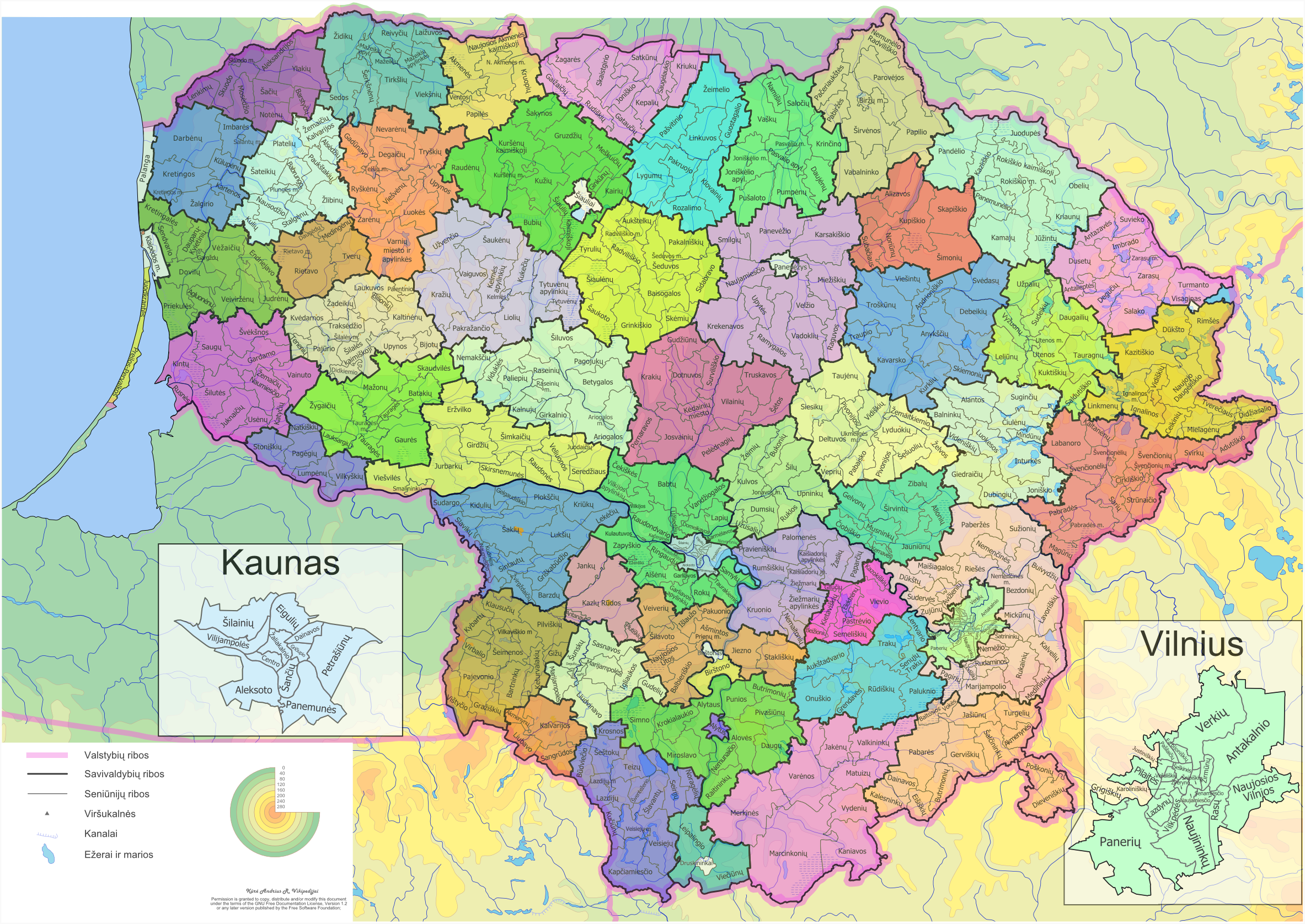
Elderships of Lithuania

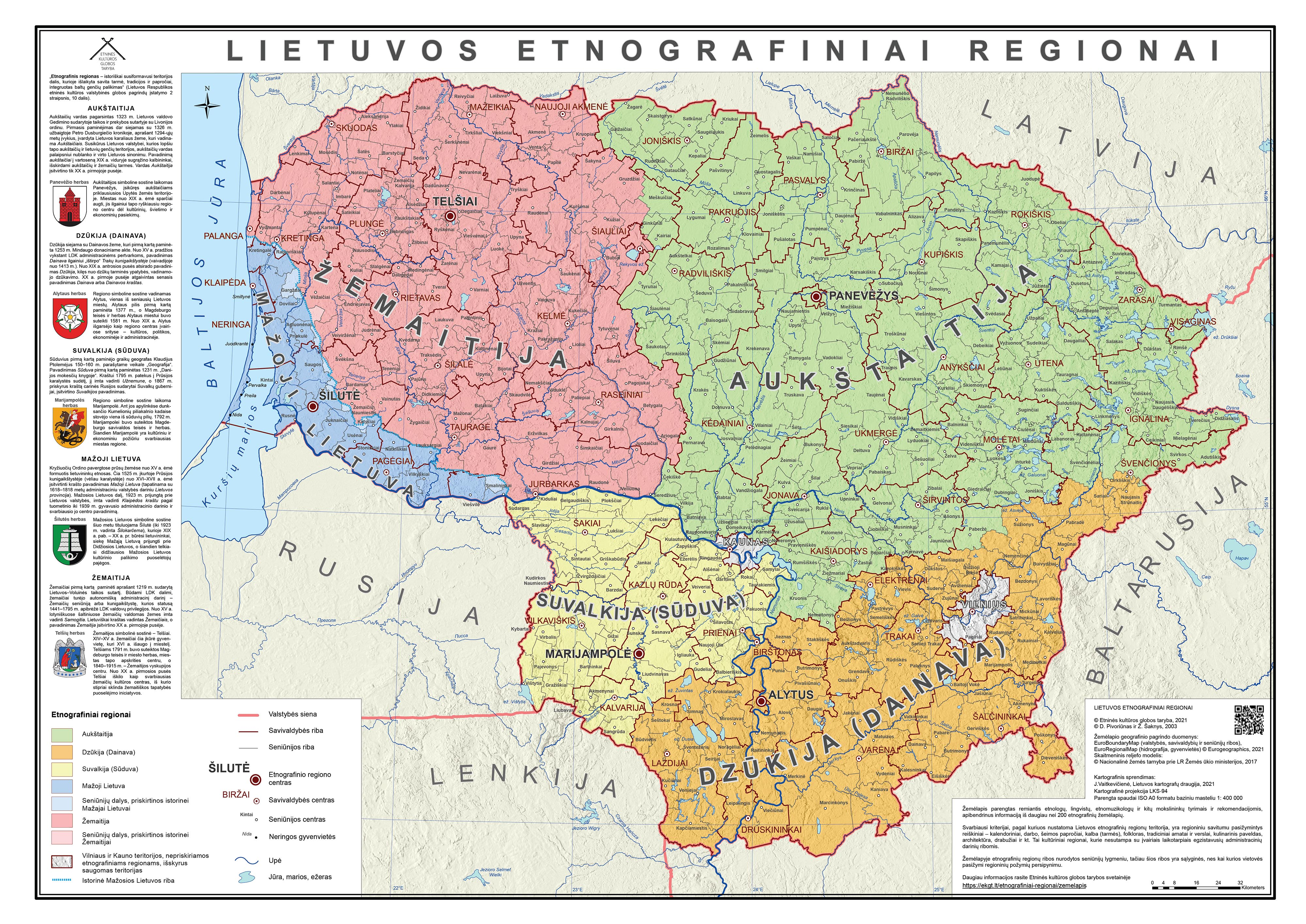
Cultural regions of Lithuania with all municipalities, elderships, cities and towns

In 1994, an administrative division of Lithuania into 10 new counties as the first level of administration was created. However, the structure was modified in 2010 with the abolishment of counties administrations. (The counties continue to be used for statistical and reporting purposes, however.) Lithuania is divided into:

- 10 counties (Lithuanian: plural – apskritys, singular – apskritis), each named after their principal city (see: Counties of Lithuania). These apskritys should not be confused with apskritys that existed in the interwar period.
- the counties are subdivided into 60 municipalities (Lithuanian: plural – savivaldybės, singular – savivaldybė). There are three types of municipalities:
  - 43 district municipalities (Lithuanian: rajono savivaldybė). They roughly correspond to districts (raions) that existed under the Soviet rule. Before 1994 they were known just as districts and still are commonly referred to as districts. The word "municipality" was added in effort to diminish the Soviet heritage (there were districts [raions] throughout the Soviet Union);
  - 7 city municipalities (Lithuanian: miesto savivaldybė). They are situated around major or important cities. In common language they are referred to as just cities or as just municipalities (because word "municipality" in Lithuanian language is associated more with cities and city rights than with districts);
  - 10 municipalities. They were all established after 1994 and they do not have the word "district" associated with them.
- municipalities consist of over 500 elderships (Lithuanian: plural – seniūnijos, singular – seniūnija).

Each municipality's government is elected in democratic elections of municipality councils. Initially, the elections took place every three years; constitutional amendments in 2002 extended the tenure to four years. The municipality mayors are elected by municipality councils. Also, municipality councils appoint elders to be in charge of an eldership. Currently it is proposed that both mayors and elders should be elected in direct elections.

Counties were ruled by apskrities viršininkas (officially translated as "governor") who was appointed by the central government in Vilnius. Their primary duty was to ensure that the municipalities obey the laws of Lithuania and the constitution. They did not have great powers vested in them, and so it was suggested that 10 counties were too many for Lithuania (the smallest county had only four municipalities). There were proposals to replace the counties with four or five lands, a new administrative unit, based on the ethnographic regions of Lithuania and centered on the country's five major cities.

On 1 July 2010, the county administrations were abolished, with counties remaining highest level territorial units of Lithuania.

== Comparison of post-1918 systems ==
Measure	Interwar (1937)			Soviet times (1989)			Independence (2004)		
Measure	Level 1	Level 2	Level 3	Level 1	Level 2	Level 3	Level 1	Level 2	Level 3
Lithuanian name	Apskritis	Valsčius	Seniūnija	–	Rajonas	Apylinkė	Apskritis	Savivaldybė	Seniūnija
How many?	23	260	2545	–	44	423	10	60	524
Self-governing?	Yes	Yes	No	–	Yes*	Yes*	No	Yes	No
Average population (in thousands)	110.9	9	1	–	27.3**	2.5	348.4	39.0**	6.6
Average territory (in km^{2})	2420	214	22	–	1449	132	6530	1088	125
* Nominally, in reality all self-governing institutions were orchestrated by the Communist Party of Lithuania ** Without major cities

== See also ==
- Counties (Lithuanian: singular – apskritis, plural – apskritys)
- Municipalities (Lithuanian: plural – savivaldybės, singular – savivaldybė)
- Elderships (or wards) (Lithuanian: plural – seniūnijos, singular – seniūnija).
- Seniūnaitija (sub-eldership, a 4th-level subdivision)
- Cities (Lithuanian: plural – miestai, singular – miestas)
- Towns (Lithuanian: plural – miesteliai, singular – miestelis)
