= Lithuanian Territorial Defense Force =

- Vietinė Rinktinė
- Active: February 16/March 1, 1944 – May 15, 1944
- Country: Lithuania
- Role: Infantry
- Size: ~10,000
- Colors: Yellow, Green, Red
- Engagements: Battle of Murowana Oszmianka; Battle of Graużyszki

Commanders
- First and only commander: Povilas Plechavičius

The Lithuanian Territorial Defense Force (LTDF; Lithuanian: Lietuvos vietinė rinktinė, LVR^{[a]}) was a short-lived Lithuanian volunteer military formation established in February 1944 in German-occupied Lithuania under the command of General Povilas Plechavičius. It was created following negotiations between Lithuanian representatives and the German occupation authorities, at a time when Germany sought additional Lithuanian manpower for security duties and the Eastern Front. Lithuanian organizers, however, regarded the force as a means of creating a nationally commanded armed formation that would operate only within Lithuania and might eventually form the basis of a restored Lithuanian army.

The LVR enjoyed a limited degree of autonomy under Lithuanian officers but was armed, supplied and authorized by the German occupation authorities. Its units were deployed primarily in southeastern Lithuania, where they fought Soviet partisans and the Polish Home Army. During these operations, members of the force were also responsible for violence against Polish civilians.

In May 1944, after serious defeats in fighting with the Home Army and growing German attempts to place the formation under direct German command and deploy its personnel outside Lithuania, Plechavičius ordered his troops not to comply and to disperse. The German authorities subsequently arrested the LVR leadership and forcibly disarmed and dissolved the remaining units. During the subsequent repressions, the German occupiers sent 52 officers to the Salaspils concentration camp, executed 86 LTDF members in Paneriai, and deported 1,089 to Stutthof and Oldenburg concentration camps.

Many former members of the LVR later participated in the anti-Soviet resistance after the Soviet reoccupation of Lithuania. The Soldiers' Union of the Lithuanian Territorial Defense Force (Lithuanian: Lietuvos vietinės rinktinės karių sąjunga), a veterans' organization, was founded in 1997.

== Background ==
=== Earlier failed mobilisation attempts ===
After Nazi Germany lost the Battle of Stalingrad in early 1943 and the Eastern Front began moving westwards, the occupying German authorities became concerned with mobilizing the population of occupied lands and revised its policy to allow Lithuanians to mobilize themselves after attempts failed to mobilize youths into the Waffen-SS and Wehrmacht units.

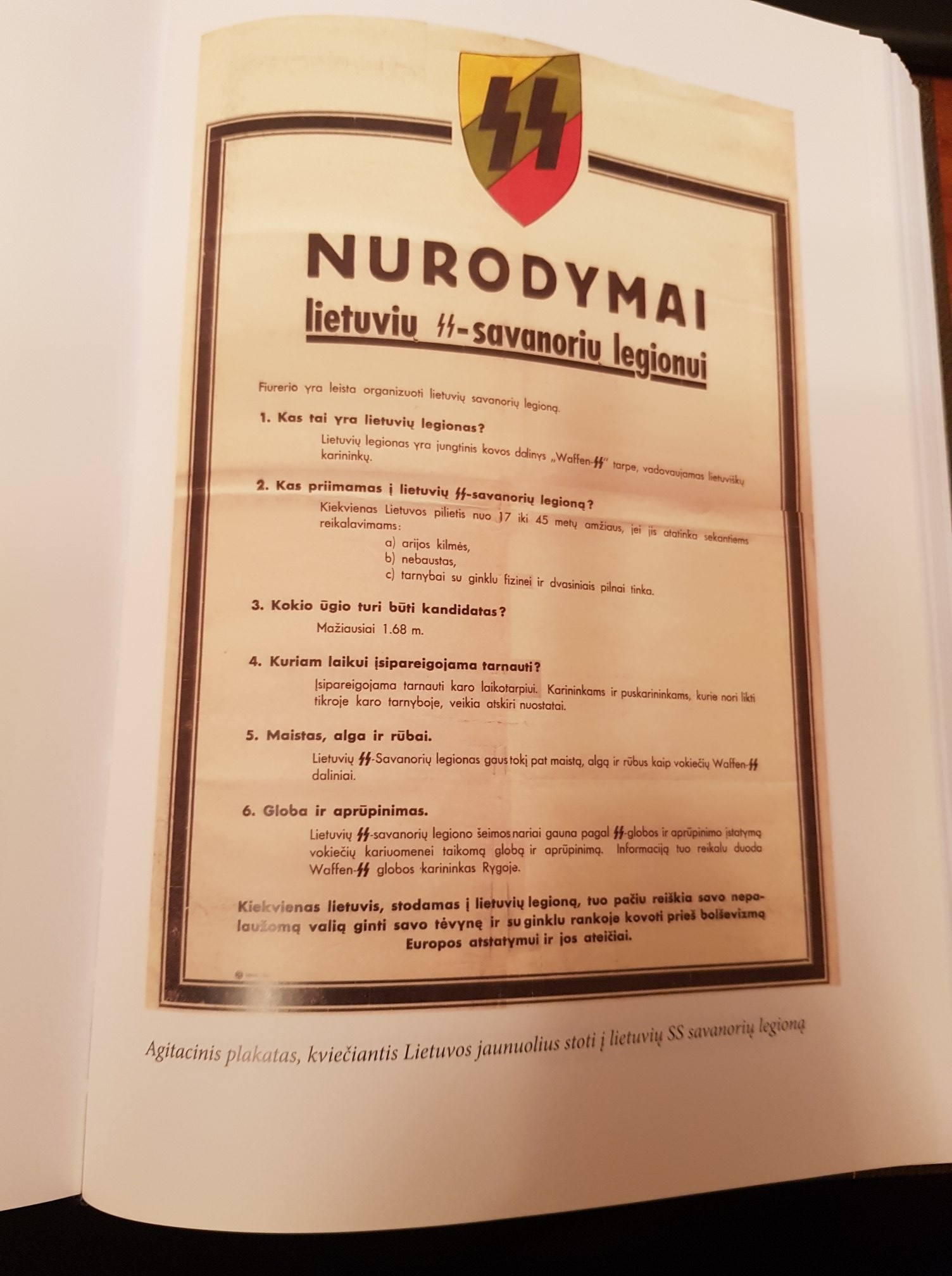
Poster calling Lithuanians aged 17-45 to the Waffen-SS

Lithuanians boycotted mobilization to the Waffen-SS in 1943; fewer than 300 men reported. The Nazis carried out reprisals against the population and deported 46 prominent figures and members of the intelligentsia to Stutthof concentration camp. The Nazis closed all Lithuanian higher education institutions March 18–19 and intensified their hunt for Lithuanian youth for forced labour in Germany.

At the end of January 1944, a compromise was reached and the Lithuanian Territorial Defence Force was established. On January 31, the Reich SS and police leader (SSPF) signed an order on the organization of Lithuanian battalions to fight against "banditry". On February 1, General Povilas Plechavičius was appointed commander of the LTDF.

=== Late 1943 ===
By late 1943, German leadership was forced to negotiate with Lithuanian representatives on the formation of a Lithuanian unit, which refused German demands to organize an SS legion. November 23–24, 1943, the Nation's Council rejected the proposal to establish an SS legion. Instead, they advocated for a national Lithuanian army, following the principles outlined by Lithuanian general Stasys Raštikis, that the Lithuanian Army consist of all types of units and weaponry, be commanded by a reliable Lithuanian officer and led by Lithuanian officers, and that all Lithuanians serving in other military units and police be allowed to join. It would only operate in Lithuania, defending it from a Bolshevik invasion, and initially consist of 60,000 soldiers. In addition, mobilization for the army would be initiated by the commander of the Lithuanian army.

=== January 1944 ===
Theodor Adrian von Renteln, General Commissioner of Lithuania, returned from Berlin during Christmas 1943 and met with first councillor Petras Kubiliūnas, professor Mykolas Biržiška, and general Antanas Rėklaitis and explained the German position to them. While agreeing to permit a Lithuanian division, the Germans refused to allow the Lithuanians to form a national army. They required that a German lead the division and a petition from Lithuanians to create it. They also demanded that the name of the inspector general of the Lithuanian armed forces be used as the name.

On 3–4 January 1944, the general councillors discussed the draft petition, in whose preamble they wrote:

"Violently breaking the solemn promises given to the Republic of Lithuania to respect the "sovereignty and territorial integrity and inviolability of Lithuania under all circumstances" (1926 treaty between the Republic of Lithuania and the Union of Socialist Soviet Republics, Article 2) on 15 June 1940, the Soviet Union's government, having militarily occupied Lithuania, falsifying the will of the Lithuanian people, and joining the territory of Lithuania to the Soviet Union with the help of the Red Army, is now again using Stalin's lips to 'liberate' the Republic of Lithuania."

They then requested permission to form the 1st Lithuanian Division, commanded by a senior Lithuanian officer, who would be called the inspector general. The division would be created by mobilization and would be tasked with the defence of Lithuanian territory from the Soviet invasion. The German administration's behaviour was assessed by the anti-Nazi Lithuanian Front's bulletin:

"Such German tendencies still show two things: first, that they do not trust the Lithuanians and do not want to allow them a larger, more independent armed force; secondly, that they are still only pursuing their unilateral interests (military and political), disregarding the interests of Lithuanians. Militarily, they want to get people to plug the gaps in their army; politically - to announce to the world that Lithuanians are asking to be accepted under German leadership and protection to fight for the New Europe."

The Lithuanians understood their interests, did not identify them with Nazi plans and refused to be blindly used by the German occupiers. Adrian von Renteln summoned general Povilas Plechavičius on January 7, 1944 to convince him that Lithuanian forces were necessary to combat Bolshevism. Plechavičius informed Renteln on January 9 that he would protect his countrymen if he was given the freedom to form and lead the Lithuanian units with independent leadership. Since military formations could only be constituted in occupied territory with the approval of Reich SSPF Heinrich Himmler, Renteln pledged to speak with Berlin.

==== Plechavičius' conditions on January 31 ====
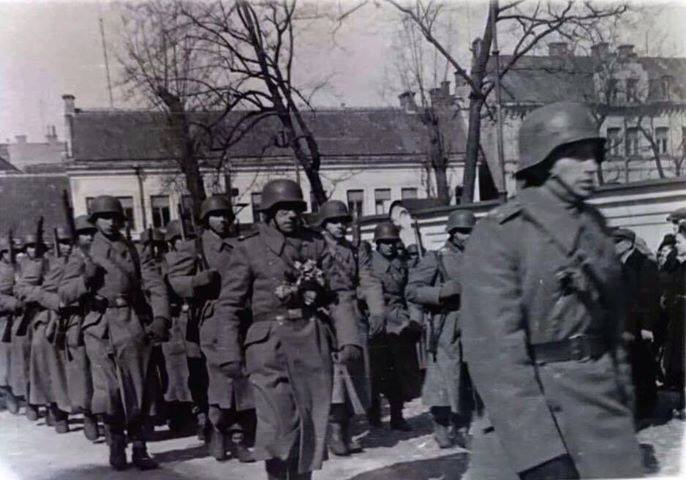
LTDF marching in the Vilnius Old Town on April 1, 1944

Plechavičius wrote to Petras Kubiliūnas, the first general councillor, on January 31, setting out the following conditions for his command of the Lithuanian unit. The minimum 10,000-strong future brigade was to be the centre of the future Lithuanian armed forces for the anti-Bolshevik fight, exclusively controlled by the brigade's commander, and employed only inside the territory of the General District of Lithuania. On Lithuanian military mobilization, certificates for a person's irreplaceability in the economy and such would be removed. The brigade's military court would follow the Lithuanian interwar military court law to enforce discipline. The brigade would be tasked with protecting strategic military sites, if not protected by the Wehrmacht, while Ukrainian and other foreign units would leave Lithuania. If needed, the commander could employ other Lithuanian units in the Lithuanian General District and confiscate vehicles. Lithuanian Police would obey the brigade commander's orders to ensure security and order in Lithuania.

The German establishment would not issue direct orders to the brigade or use individual units at will and would not hamper its creation. Deportation of Lithuanians for forced labour in Nazi Germany would stop during the brigade's creation. The Lithuanians would be armed, clothed and equipped along the lines of the German army, while the relatives of their dead and wounded would be treated identically to those of the German army. The General Commissioner of Lithuania would appoint the brigade commander, who would author the text of the oath, together with the head of the General Commissariat's police department.

That same day, Hermann Harm, SSPF in Lithuania, wrote Kubiliūnas a letter about Plechavičius' conditions, many of which were unmet, such as transfer of officers from police battalions, but Plechavičius agreed regardless to be the LTDF's leader. According to Lithuanian general Stasys Raštikis' memoirs, there were three candidates for the commander, himself, Antanas Rėklaitis, and Povilas Plechavičius. After the first two refused, Plechavičius became commander on February 1.

On 31 January 1944, the SSPF headquarters signed an order for the organization of Lithuanian battalions to fight against banditry. That same day, the Reich SSPF Heinrich Himmler issued an order to recruit 50,000 Lithuanians for the Wehrmacht's Army Group North.

=== Anti-Nazi resistance and negotiations ===
Long negotiations between SSPF Ostland Friedrich Jeckeln, Hermann Harm, and Lithuanians led to an agreement about a 5,000-man (later 10,000) unit called the Lithuanian Territorial Defence Force, recruited from Lithuanian self-organized military headquarters (Lithuanian: komendatūra) with military units assigned to it. The soldiers would wear Lithuanian insignia. The formal agreement was signed on February 13.

Lithuanian anti-Nazi resistance organizations supported the LTDF, which they wanted to use to fight against Soviet partisans in Lithuania and the Soviet Red Army when Nazi Germany was defeated. The LTDF was to be the nucleus of these military units to restore the Lithuanian state, on which the army of the Republic of Lithuania would be based. The Nazi occupation authorities viewed the LTDF differently and termed its units police battalions, planning to use them for Eastern Front battles and only minimally to fight Soviet partisans. The Germans also wanted to recruit tens of thousands of Lithuanians into the Wehrmacht auxiliary units through the LTDF.

=== Situation in eastern Lithuania ===
During the German occupation of eastern Lithuania from 1941 to 1944, there were four different military groups, whose goals differed greatly; the incompatibility of the goals led to inevitable confrontation and conflict between the groups. Fighters from the anti-Nazi Lithuanian underground and Polish Home Army attempted to negotiate a joint struggle against the Nazi occupation but failed.

Soviet partisans wanted to return Lithuania to Soviet occupation and were opposed to the others: the Lithuanian Territorial Defence Force, the occupying German troops, and the Home Army. However, Soviet partisans had similar enemies to the latter group, even if their goals differed. The Polish Home Army wanted to restore the Polish state within its pre-1939 borders.

From 1943, Polish partisan units began to be established in the Vilnius region, 15 of them between April and June 1944. Polish partisans attacked the German and Lithuanian police as well as Soviet partisans. From the end of 1943, the Polish Home Army escalated its activity and began attacking towns and district centres, terrorizing Lithuanians, whether local government officials, teachers or other civilians. Sometimes, the Polish Home Army de facto ruled some areas in eastern Lithuania. The LTDF's main assignment was to fight against bandits and partisans, widespread in eastern Lithuania. On Lithuanian territory, Soviet partisans operated from two main camps, one near Narach and another in Rūdninkai forest, from which the partisan groups reached even Samogitia. Even more numerous were the Home Army's Polish partisan units. There were also other marauding gangs. Seven LTDF battalions were sent to eastern Lithuania to fight Soviet partisans and the Polish Home Army. In the battles against the Polish Home Army on 5 May 1944, about 70 LTDF soldiers were killed, and several hundred were taken prisoner. Roughly 30 were shot after a Polish Home Army court-martial, while others were disarmed and released.

== Formation and organization ==
=== February ===
The formation of the LTDF began from its headquarters. On February 3, Colonel Oskaras Urbonas was appointed the LTDF's chief of staff. On February 4, the following were invited as heads of departments of the headquarters:

Rank	Individual	Department
General Staff Colonel	Antanas Rėklaitis	I
General Staff Lieutenant Colonel	Aleksandras Andriušaitis	II
General Staff Colonel	Antanas Šova	III
Lieutenant Colonel	Vladas Grudzinskas	IV

Captain Justinas Liaukus was appointed adjutant of the LTDF's staff. By February 8, the headquarters were almost completely formed. Then began the formation of local military headquarters, whose task it was to organize the LTDF's volunteer units. On February 10–12, 25 county commandants were appointed. The Germans agreed to form 10 battalions, each of about 500 men. It was planned to increase the number of battalions to 20. The Germans promised to provide the LTDF with weapons, ammunition, and food.

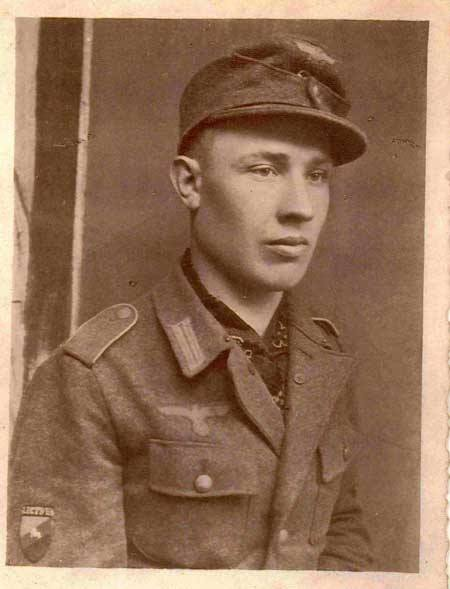
Young Lithuanian volunteer in Wehrmacht uniform

On February 16, Lithuanian Independence Day, Plechavičius made a radio appeal to the nation for volunteers. This day can be considered as the founding day of the LTDF. The appeal was very successful and estimates put the number of volunteers between 20,000 and 30,000. On February 21, the county commandant offices started registering volunteers.

Seven battalions stationed in Marijampolė, Kalvarija, and Seredžius were to form the core of the LTDF and would be used for larger operations according to Plechavičius' orders. Small units were kept at the disposal of county commandants. A training battalion in Marijampolė was planned for the training of officer cadres and non-commissioned officers. The Supreme Committee for the Liberation of Lithuania that was the anti-Nazi resistance in Lithuania also approved the organization of the LTDF.

The Germans were surprised by the number of volunteers, as their previous appeals had gone unheeded. Possibly perceiving the growing popularity of the unit as a threat, they began to interfere, contrary to the signed agreement. On March 22, SS Obergruppenführer and SD General Friedrich Jeckeln called for 70–80,000 Hiwis for the Wehrmacht. Chief-of-Staff of the Northern Front Field Marshal Walter Model further demanded that the Lithuanians provide personnel for 15 security battalions for military airports. General Commissioner of Lithuania Theodor Adrian von Renteln added his demand for labourers to be sent to work in Germany. They were not the only German officials to issue demands for Lithuanian personnel. Plechavičius rejected and resisted such demands.

=== March ===
By March 1, more than 19,500 men had already registered. It was decided to organize 13 battalions, numbered 301st, 302nd, 303rd, 304th, 305th, 306th, 307th, 308th, 309th, 310th, 241st, 242nd and 243rd, and a separate training battalion. March 1 can be considered the beginning of the LTDF. On March 3, the LTDF already had 553 officers, 1,522 non-commissioned officers, and 3,879 who had served in the pre-war Lithuanian army, while the remaining soldiers had not served before.

The creation process was not smooth because Germans did not trust the LTDF. They ordered the reorganization of already formed battalions of four companies into battalions of three companies and were constantly delaying delivery of arms, munitions, transportation, and communication. Because the SS did not trust the Lithuanian officers, they demanded that German officers called Zahlmeisters be inserted into LTDF units.

An oath, similar to one used by the Lithuanian armed forces, was prepared in early March, which read:

I, a volunteer soldier of the Territorial Defence Force, swear before Almighty God that I will not spare my strength and life, and will defend the land of Lithuania from the Bolshevik hordes. To this end, I will diligently carry out all the orders of my superiors, be brave and honestly perform my duties, as befits a decent and honorable Lithuanian soldier. So help me, God.

SSPF Hermann Harm rejected this oath and altered it to include a personal oath to Hitler. The Lithuanian leadership, knowing that such an oath was unacceptable to Lithuanian soldiers, delayed the ceremony repeatedly and consciously, and thus the oath had not been taken by the time that the formation disbanded.

=== April ===
On April 6, Plechavičius was given an order to mobilize the entire country. He refused, saying that it was impossible until the formation of his existing detachment was finished; this increased the Germans' displeasure with him. Plechavičius wrote in his postwar memoirs that in late April, German plans to mobilize Lithuanians into the Wehrmacht became obvious, and LTDF headquarters began secretly organizing underground armed forces, to include Lithuanian Army officers, veterans of the Lithuanian Wars of Independence, and former members of Lithuanian Riflemen's Union all across Lithuania. The plans were to assemble around 75–80,000 men. Most of the organizational structure was laid, and it served as a basis for the armed anti-Soviet resistance.

According to the LTDF commander's order of 28 April 1944, nine of the LTDF's battalions were combined into larger units. The 303rd, 305th, 306th, and 309th Battalions were combined into the Vilnius Infantry Regiment. Before that, the movement of the battalions to their intended destinations began. The 303rd Battalion was moved from Marijampolė to its new garrison in Trakai on April 15 General Staff Colonel Jonas Šlepetys was appointed commander of the Vilnius Infantry Regiment after being dismissed as commander of the 306th Battalion. Reserve officer Erikas Pempė served as an interpreter and special-duties officer with the Vilnius Command during April and May 1944.

The 301st, 308th, and 310th Battalions were combined into the Kaunas Infantry Regiment, with Colonel Tomas Vidugiris as its commander. At the beginning of May, the regimental commander received an order for the regiment to go to Vilnius. There, at the request of the SS leadership, the regiment was to be split up and deployed in companies.

In April, the Polish AK in the Vilnius region attempted to begin negotiations with Plechavičius, proposing a non-aggression pact and cooperation against Nazi Germany. The Lithuanians refused and demanded that the Poles either abandon the disputed Vilnius region or subordinate themselves to the Lithuanians in their anti-Soviet struggle. Justina Smalkyté claims that the 305th Battalion, together with Lithuanian auxiliary policemen, was involved in the round-up of peasants from a predominantly Polish village on April 29 who were ultimately deported as forced labourers to Germany. In early May, the LTDF initiated a widespread anti-partisan operation against the Polish and Soviet partisans in the area.

Even before the combat against Polish partisans, Plechavičius issued an order condemning unkind or even brutal treatment of any inhabitants of Lithuania, no matter what language they spoke, meaning that he forbade anti-Polish actions. Still, reports within the Polish Home Army (AK) accused the LTDF of anti-Polish aggression and murdering Polish civilians. The Lithuanian historian Arūnas Bubnys wrote that these casualties were most likely collateral damage in the crossfire between the Polish AK and the LTDF. Paweł Rokicki, however, states that 11 people were murdered in attacks on Polish localities, many others were beaten, and farms were also burned down, including the entire village of Adamowszczyzna.

== Kaunas Infantry Regiment ==
By May 3–4, all three battalions of the Kaunas Infantry Regiment were already in the Vilnius region and deployed as companies. All battalions were composed of volunteers with no previous military service, poorly armed and equipped. Despite their unpreparedness, they faced the Polish partisan units active in that area on May 4.

=== May 4 ===
On May 4, the 310th Battalion's 2nd Company, marching from Jašiūnai to Turgeliai, was attacked by Polish partisans from the 3rd AK Brigade and forced to withdraw to Jašiūnai. Company commander Major Vytautas Narkevičius and two soldiers were captured and shot by Polish partisans because civilians had been killed in Merkinė (also referred to as Paulava, Polish: Pawłów).

=== May 5 ===
Polish historian Piotr Łossowski claims that the Lithuanian 301st Battalion suffered 47 casualties at Hraŭžyški, and was dispersed by the 8th and 12th AK Brigades on May 5.

=== May 6 ===
On May 6, two companies of the 308th Battalion, marching to Hraŭžyški (Lithuanian: Graužiškės; Polish: Graużyszki), fought with Polish partisans from the 8th, 9th and 13th AK Brigades. Henryk Piskunowicz claims that the unit burned the villages of Sienkaŭščyna and Adamkaŭščyna and murdered their inhabitants. With about 20 people killed, 15 wounded and 70 captured, the battalion retreated to Ashmyany. The Poles returned their captives to Ashmyany wearing only their underwear.

=== May 13 ===
On the night of May 13, large groups of Polish partisans surrounded two companies of the 301st Battalion in Muravanaja Ašmianka (Lithuanian: Ašmenėlė; Polish: Murowana Oszmianka) and one company in Talminava (Lithuanian: Tolminovas; Polish: Tołminowo) The company, surrounded, was almost completely destroyed by the Poles.

The AK organized a concentrated assault against the fortified Lithuanian positions around Muravanaja Ašmianka. The defences, reinforced with concrete bunkers and trenches, were manned by the 301st Battalion. During the night of May 13–14, the 3rd AK Brigade assaulted the village from the west and north-west, while the 8th and 12th Brigades attacked from the south and east. The remainder of the Polish forces, the 13th and 9th Brigades, secured the Muravanaja Ašmianka–Talminava road. During the battle, the Lithuanian force lost 60 men, while 170 were taken prisoner. Another 117 Lithuanian soldiers were taken prisoner later that night in the nearby village of Talminava. After the battle, all Lithuanian prisoners were disarmed and set free wearing only their long johns and helmets. Polish historian Rafał Wnuk says that the weapons and uniforms taken from the Lithuanians significantly improved the equipment of the Polish forces. The Poles used the element of surprise because the Lithuanians had around 150 more soldiers. The disparity in size, and the fact that Lithuanians no longer felt safe inside their own barracks, added to the importance of the defeat.

Both sides incurred heavy losses. Of the LTDF's 301st Battalion, 30 men were killed, including the commander of the 2nd Company, Capt. Počebutas. Five were wounded, and about 350 were captured. The captives were later brought back disarmed and stripped to their underwear.

=== May 15 ===
On May 15, German Lieutenant Colonel Dietl issued an order to the battalions to which he was attached to go to Vilnius. On their way, the 310th Battalion was surrounded by SS units and disarmed. When the disarmed battalion arrived at the Vilnius airfield, the Germans selected 12 men and took them away. After some time, they announced that those taken away had been shot and that the guilt of the battalion had been "atoned for". In addition, 41 soldiers of the LTDF who were in the guard-house in Vilnius were killed by the Germans.

Also that day, having arrived with two motorized companies in Ashmyany, Dietl gathered Lithuanian officers in Ashmyany and took them to the divisional headquarters of the 221st Security Division. There, they were told that the units of the regiment were completely demoralized and unfit for combat, so the regiment was disarmed, put in trucks, and returned to Kaunas for training. The officers were arrested; most of them were later sent to the Salaspils concentration camp.

== Vilnius Infantry Regiment ==
The 305th Battalion of the Vilnius Regiment was transferred to Eišiškės, where 14 soldiers of the battalion were killed in fighting with the AK, and three soldiers on a reconnaissance mission were bayonetted.

Two companies of the 306th Battalion were sent from Vilnius to Rūdninkai. From the battalion, 17 men were shot by the Germans, and the soldiers were forcibly taken to Germany. However, one company successfully avoided capture by the Germans and returned home.

The 309th Battalion, sent to Varėna, was more successful in escaping German capture, and two of the battalion's companies managed to withdraw to their homeland with their weapons.

== Marijampolė Military School ==
About 2,000 men gathered at the Marijampolė military school. As the situation worsened and relations with the Germans worsened, Plechavičius ordered the military school to disband in early May. As the LTDF began to be liquidated on May 15, only about 160 people were in the military school. On the morning of May 16, all those who remained were arrested by the Germans and the officers were separated from the cadets and soldiers. A few days later, the Germans took 106 cadets to the Stutthof concentration camp in trucks.

== Tensions with the Germans ==
Beginning in March, Germans constantly tried to use LTDF to mobilize Lithuanians for labour in Germany for the Wehrmacht and the Hiwis, but Plechavičius blocked this. As tensions between Germans and LTDF grew, Plechavičius even sent a resignation request and suggested demobilising the LTDF on April 12. Demands and tension continued to grow. At the end of April, Plechavičius secretly blocked the creation of a list of conscripts into the German army. He opposed the mobilization, announced at the beginning of May and scheduled to be complete on May 8. The mobilization failed completely; only 3–5% of the men of conscription age, most of whom were unfit for military service, reported to the German authorities. Plechavičius personally ordered his officers in territorial branches to ignore the mobilization order.

Starting in April, the Germans considered transforming the LTDF into an auxiliary police service of the SS. On May 9, 1944, after the unsuccessful attempt to mobilize, Friedrich Jeckeln ordered units in the Vilnius region to recognize his direct authority. All other units of LTDF were to become subordinate to the regional German commanders. Jeckeln demanded that the troops take an oath to Hitler. Furthermore, the detachment was to wear SS uniforms and use the Heil Hitler greeting.

On hearing of this order and being informed that it had been signed by Jeckeln as early as April 15, Plechavičius opposed this challenge to his authority and rejected the demands. On May 9, he ordered cadets training in Marijampolė to return home. He also ordered LTDF battalions in the Vilnius region to stop hostilities with AK forces and return to their assigned garrisons. Plechavičius ordered his men to disband and disappear into the forests with their weapons and uniforms. The Lithuanian headquarters directed their units in the field to obey only the orders of the Lithuanian chain of command. On May 12, Plechavičius refused to meet with the newly-appointed Kurt Hintze and instead sent his chief of staff, Colonel Oskaras Urbonas, who told Hintze that Plechavičius refused to be an SS officer, or ever serve in that structure. Plechavičius refused Jeckeln's suggestion that the LTDF fight on the Western Front. The failures of the operation against the Polish Home Army, culminating in the LTDF defeat in the Battle of Murowana Oszmianka on May 13–14, gave the Germans another excuse to assert control over the formation.

== Persecutions ==
Plechavičius and Urbonas were arrested on May 15. Jeckeln and Hintze delivered a speech before the remaining LTDF officers, accusing them of banditry, sabotage, and a political agenda, and threatening them with execution ot transfer to concentration camps. Jeckeln announced that the LTDF would be disbanded and disarmed. Soldiers of the LTDF would be transferred to German air defence forces in the Luftwaffe. Anyone who deserted would be shot on sight and their families punished.

Together with other members of the LTDF staff, Plechavičius was deported to Salaspils concentration camp in Latvia. Altogether, 52 LTDF officers were sent to Salaspils. To make an example, Germans publicly executed 12 randomly selected soldiers from a Vilnius line-up of some 800 men. 84 or 86 members of the LTDF were shot in Paneriai. While some of the arrested men were being transported to Kaunas, one of the NCOs was executed on the spot. Germans sent 106 cadets to Stutthof, and 983 soldiers to Oldenburg concentration camp.

Most of the soldiers were to be disarmed and arrested by the Germans, but they succeeded in disarming only four out of 14 battalions. On May 16, German units arrived to liquidate the Marijampolė officers' school, but found only a dozen soldiers. A firefight began when they tried to disarm them, and four or five soldiers were killed.

About 3,500 members of the LTDF were drafted by force into other Nazi formations: several infantry battalions under Colonel Adolfas Birontas were sent to the Eastern Front, some became guards at Luftwaffe installations outside Lithuania, and others were sent to Germany as forced labour. LTDF was the last large mobilization attempt by the Nazis.

Many soldiers managed to evade the Germans and disappear with their weapons, forming the core of the armed anti-Soviet resistance, which waged a guerrilla war for the next eight years. In 1944, the Soviets already covertly planned to destroy the remnants of Plechavičius' army, and the Soviets executed or imprisoned LTDF soldiers they captured.

== Assessment ==
There are differing opinions about the actions of the Lithuanian Territorial Defence Force during its brief existence. The Lithuanian historian Saulius Sužiedėlis wrote that the LTDF was not collaborationist, because:

"In establishing the Force, the Lithuanians were clearly making an effort to do the opposite of what Jan T. Gross has defined as collaboration, that is, granting the occupier authority. They were trying to siphon power and authority away from the Germans. Thus, the creation of the Force was not an act of collaboration. The non-Communist resistance understood this and made the appropriate distinctions between those who had betrayed the interests of the group and those who had not. One of the most striking aspects of the Local Force is how quickly it moved from conditional cooperation to active resistance as circumstances changed, utilizing a relatively sophisticated network of underground contacts within the society, the Lithuanian officer corps and the native administration."

The motivation to create the LTDF was not to aid the German occupation whose replacement by Soviet occupiers they foresaw, but to prepare an anti-Soviet resistance by creating a nucleus for the future Lithuanian army. Former cadet Kazys Blaževičius wrote:

"The short and dramatic history of the force's soldiers - LTDF lasted for almost three months - proves that neither gen. P. Plechavičius, nor his officers were German collaborators."

In contrast, Justina Smalkytė said that the LTDF was a case of military collaboration, and that post-1990 Lithuanian scholarship produced "biased historical accounts that are highly nationalist in tone". Polish researcher Paweł Rokicki also describes the LTDF as "collaborationist". According to Joachim Tauber, the LTDF is a specific example of Lithuanian collaboration, the result of German-Lithuanian negotiations, whose creation was supported by the Lithuanian anti-Nazi resistance movement. The organisation itself was used to pursue its own ethnic-national goals, not always congruent with German objectives.

== See also ==
- German occupation of Lithuania during World War II
- Lithuanian partisans

== Notes ==
a Vietinė rinktinė has several translations into English, which can cause some confusion. Translations include: Territorial Defense Force, Home Army, Home Defense, Local Defense, Local Lithuanian Detachment, Lithuanian Home Formation, etc. The German term German: Litauische Sonderverbände means Lithuanian Special Group.

== Bibliography ==
=== Secondary sources ===
In English

- Lane, Thomas (2001). Lithuania: Stepping Westward. Routledge. ISBN 0-415-26731-5.
- Mackevičius, Mečislovas (Winter 1986). "Lithuanian resistance to German mobilization attempts 1941–1944". Lituanus. 4 (32). ISSN 0024-5089. Archived from the original on 17 July 2002.
- Ivinskis, Zenonas (1965). "4. Lithuania During the War: Resistance Against the Soviet and the Nazi Occupants". In Vardys, V. Stanley (ed.). Lithuania under the Soviets: Portrait of a Nation. New York, U.S.A.: Frederick A. Praeger Publishers. LCCN 65-14060.
- Peterson, Roger D. (2001). Resistance and Rebellion: Lessons from Eastern Europe. Cambridge University Press. ISBN 0-521-77000-9.
- Piotrowski, Tadeusz (1997). Poland's Holocaust. McFarland & Company. ISBN 0-7864-0371-3.
- Sužiedėlis, Saulius (1990). "The military mobilization campaigns of 1943 and 1944 in German-occupied Lithuania: Contrasts in resistance and collaboration". Journal of Baltic Studies. 21 (1): 33–52. doi:10.1080/01629778900000231. ISSN 0162-9778.
- Smalkyté, Justina (2022). "Gender, Ethnicity, and Multidirectional Violence in the Last Months of the German Rule in Lithuania: A Case Study of Local Force Battalions". In Konrád, Ota; Barth, Boris; Mrňka, Jaromír (eds.). Collective Identities and Post-War Violence in Europe, 1944–48. Cambridge University Press. ISBN 978-1-139-42816-3.
- Tauber, Joachim (2021). "Collaboration in Lithuania". In Bitunjac, Martina; Schoeps, Julius H. (eds.). Complicated Complicity: European Collaboration with Nazi Germany during World War II. Walter de Gruyter GmbH & Co KG. ISBN 978-3-11-067118-6.

In Lithuanian

- Anušauskas, Arvydas (2005). Lietuva 1940–1990: okupuotos Lietuvos istorija (in Lithuanian). Vilnius: Lietuvos gyventojų genocido ir rezistencijos tyrimo centras. ISBN 9986-757-65-7.
- Blaževičius, Kazys (2004a). "Žemaitijos valdovas". XXI amžius (in Lithuanian). 6 (1209).
- Blaževičius, Kazys (2004b). "Tiesa glūdi ne tik archyvuose". XXI amžius (in Lithuanian). 86 (1289).
- Bubnys, Arūnas (1998). Vokiečių okupuota Lietuva (1941-1944) (PDF) (in Lithuanian). Vilnius: Lietuvos gyventojų genocido ir rezistencijos tyrimo centras. ISBN 9986-757-12-6.
- Bubnys, Arūnas (2002-08-14). "Armija Krajova". Universal Lithuanian Encyclopedia (in Lithuanian).
- Bubnys, Arūnas (2018-08-30). "Vietinė rinktinė". Universal Lithuanian Encyclopedia (in Lithuanian).
- Bubnys, Arūnas; Žygelis, Dalius (2014). "Lietuvos vietinė rinktinė. Įkūrimo ir kovos istorija" ["Lithuanian national team. History of foundation and struggle"] (PDF). Karys (in Lithuanian). 2 (2018).
- Čekutis, Ričardas; Žygelis, Dalius (2006-02-06). ""Laisvės kryžkelės" (II) – Povilas Plechavičius ir Lietuvos vietinė rinktinė" (in Lithuanian).
- Knezys, Stasys (2001). "Karininkai Vietinėje rinktinėje". In Žalienė, Dalia; Gudienė, Danguolė (eds.). Lietuvos kariuomenės karininkai (1918-1953) (in Lithuanian). Vol. I. Vilnius: National Museum of Lithuania. ISBN 9955-415-10-X.

In Polish

- Banasikowski, Edmund (1988). Na zew ziemi wileńskiej (in Polish). Paris: Editions Spotkania. ISBN 9782869140356. OCLC 18528462.
- Łossowski, Piotr (1991). Polska–Litwa: ostatnie sto lat (in Polish). Warsaw: Oskar. ISBN 83-85239-06-5.
- Piskunowicz, Henryk (1996). "Armia Krajowa na Wileńszczyżnie". In Komorowski, Krzysztof (ed.). Armia Krajowa: Rozwój organizacyjny (in Polish). Bellona Publishing House. ISBN 83-11-08544-7.
- Piskunowicz, Henryk (1997). "Działalnośc zbrojna Armi Krajowej na Wileńszczyśnie w latach 1942–1944". In Strzembosz, Tomasz (ed.). Armia Krajowa na Nowogródczyźnie i Wileńszczyźnie (1941–1945) (in Polish). Warsaw: Institute of Political Sciences, Polish Academy of Sciences. OCLC 38532177.
- Rokicki, Paweł (2015). Glinciszki i Dubinki. Zbrodnie wojenne na Wileńszczyźnie w połowie 1944 roku i ich konsekwencje we współczesnych relacjach polsko-litewskich [Glinciszki and Dubinki. War crimes in the Vilnius Region in mid-1944 and their consequences in contemporary Polish-Lithuanian relations] (PDF). Monografie (in Polish). Warsaw: Institute of National Remembrance. ISBN 978-83-8229-224-4.
- Wnuk, Rafał (2018). Leśni bracia. Podziemie antykomunistyczne na Litwie, Łotwie i w Estonii 1944-1956 [Forest Brothers. Anti-communist underground in Lithuania, Latvia and Estonia 1944-1956] (in Polish). Lublin.

=== Memoirs ===
- Jurgėla, Petras (1978). Gen. Povilas Plechavičius (PDF) (in Lithuanian). Brooklyn, New York.
