= Veiveriai Teachers' Seminary =

Coordinates: 54°46′00″N 23°43′45″E

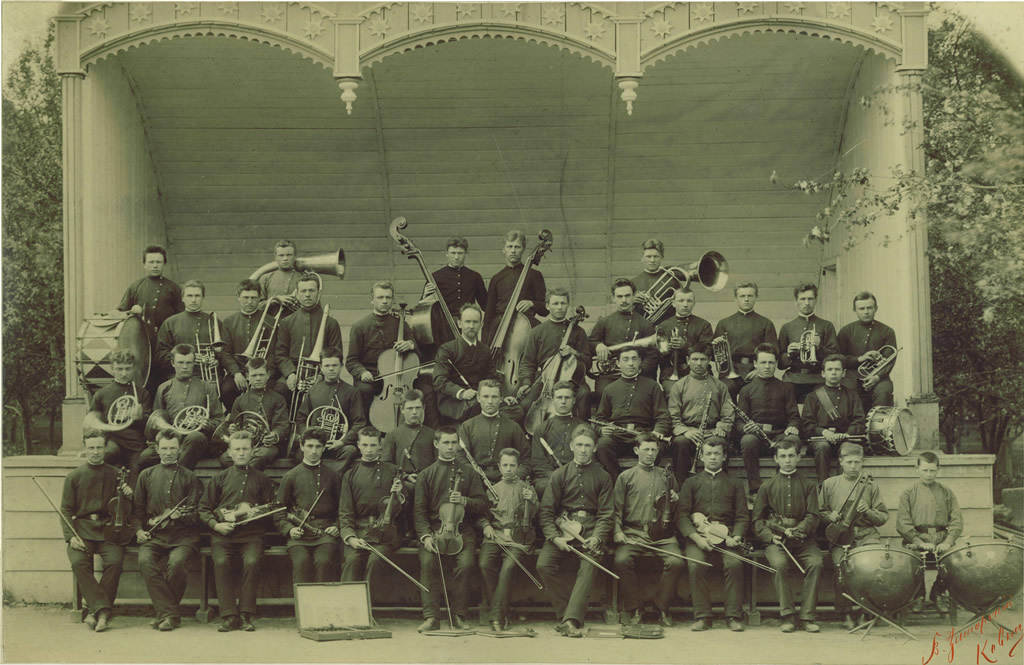
Orchestra of the Veiveriai Teachers' Seminary

Veiveriai Teachers' Seminary was a teachers' seminar in Veiveriai, Suwałki Governorate, Congress Poland (now Lithuania). It was established as teachers' courses in 1866 and reorganized into a seminary in 1872. It prepared teachers for elementary schools in the Suwałki Governorate. During World War I, the seminary was evacuated into Russia and subsequently disbanded. During its existence, the seminary prepared 1,025 teachers, some of which later became prominent figures in Lithuanian education, politics, and culture.

== Background ==
After the Uprising of 1863, Tsarist authorities closed all institutions of higher education in Lithuania and implemented a radical Russification program. According to this program, Lithuanian schools would be closed or replaced with Russian schools. To prepare teachers for these new Russian schools, two teachers' seminaries were established: one in Veiveriai for the Suwałki Governorate and another in Panevėžys for the Vilna and Kovno Governorates. The Veiveriai Seminary was open only to Catholics of Lithuanian origin, while the seminary in Panevėžys was open only to Eastern Orthodoxs. It was hoped that these Lithuanian teachers prepared in Russian spirit would work in Polish provinces and would turn their students away from Polish language and culture.

== History ==
Veiveriai Seminary was established in two-story brick post office building, left empty since the office closed after the Warsaw – Saint Petersburg Railway was opened. The seminary was a three-year school, that accepted 30 students annually. Therefore, it had about 90 students at any given time. The curriculum was taught in the Russian language and included religion, pedagogy, Lithuanian and Russian languages, history, mathematics, biology and geography, cursive, music, etc. Students also had to complete a certain number of hours in the seminary's gardens growing fruits and vegetables. The seminary also boasted a choir and an orchestra. After graduation students would be assigned work in Polish provinces; those who received scholarships had to complete at least 4 years at the designated location.

Despite strict prohibitions on speaking in Lithuanian and hopes that the seminary would become a center of Russification, Veiveriai became an important center of the Lithuanian National Revival. Tomas Ferdinandas Žilinskas, who helped to found the seminary and worked there for 37 years, was one of the activists in the revival movement. Despite official rules, Žilinskas encouraged his students to read banned Lithuanian books and speak in Lithuanian. Other students took part in illegal book smuggling, hiding the books under the altar of a cemetery chapel. Starting in 1881 students even published 10 issues of a Lithuanian-language monthly Laimės valandos (Hours of Happiness).

During the Russian Revolution of 1905, students demanded to change the subject language from Russian to Lithuanian. The seminary was temporarily closed and 37 students were arrested; the teaching language policy was not changed, but it was allowed to speak Lithuanian in public. In 1915, during World War I, the seminary was evacuated into Russia, but never returned. Its last class graduated on March 1, 1918. Its former building was used to establish a secondary school, which was named after Žilinskas. The school operates to this day.

== Alumni ==
- Mykolas Krupavičius, Minister of Agriculture
- Kazys Skučas, Minister of the Internal Affairs
- Antanas Žmuidzinavičius, painter
