= Voldemarininkai =

The voldemarininkai were a group of supporters of Augustinas Voldemaras, former Prime Minister of Lithuania, active in Lithuania from 1929 to 1941. The group stemmed from the militarised Iron Wolf organisation established in 1927 to help suppress opponents of President Antanas Smetona and Prime Minister Voldemaras. When Voldemaras was ousted in September 1929, the Iron Wolf was closed, but its members remained loyal to Voldemaras and became known as voldemarininkai. Many of them were officers in the Lithuanian Army. Voldemarininkai effectively became the third major opposition force to Smetona's regime (the other two were the Lithuanian Christian Democratic Party and the Lithuanian Popular Peasants' Union).

In 1929–1940, voldemarininkai planned eight coups against Smetona. The largest and most threatening attempt was on 6–7 June 1934. Voldemarininkai became more active again after Lithuania accepted the Polish ultimatum of March 1938. They increasingly sympathised and collaborated with Nazi Germany. After the German occupation of Lithuania in June 1941, voldemarininkai reestablished Iron Wolf and gained control of the Lithuanian police and the Lithuanian TDA Battalion, which participated in the Holocaust and killed about 26,000 Jews between July and December 1941.

== Background ==
The democratically elected government of Lithuania was deposed during the military coup d'état of December 1926. It was replaced by the government of President Antanas Smetona and Prime Minister Augustinas Voldemaras. After two unsuccessful counter-coups in 1927, the new government felt insecure and established the militarised Iron Wolf organisation to help the new regime fight its opponents. It was inspired by the Blackshirts, an Italian fascist organisation loyal to Benito Mussolini. By June 1929, it grew to 4,164 members, of which 56% had served in the military.

Iron Wolf was loyal to Voldemaras, and rumours suggested he might use it to oust Smetona. However, Smetona acted first and removed Voldemaras as Prime Minister on 19 September 1929. Iron Wolf split into two – those loyal to Smetona and those loyal to Voldemaras. Several most active members of Iron Wolf were exiled from Kaunas to the province. After his dismissal, Voldemaras gave interviews to the opposition press and made vague hints about plans to return to power. On 30 November 1929, the office of the Supreme Staff of Iron Wolf was bombed, giving Smetona an impetus for a full-scale prosecution of Voldemaras supporters. By early 1930, about 60 supporters of Voldemaras were dismissed from government or military jobs, about 100 demoted, and 67 deported to the province. Iron Wolf's newspaper Tautos kelias was closed. As a result, voldemarininkai began organising clandestine cells, most active in Samogitia. Smetona and his supporters attempted to reorganise remaining loyal members of Iron Wolf, but the organisation was in total disarray and was officially closed on 24 May 1930.

== Anti-government plots in 1930 ==
=== Coup plans ===
The State Security Department collected information on voldemarininkai activities. According to a report by Augustinas Povilaitis, they planned an anti-Smetona coup already in November 1929, but it fell apart because Petras Kubiliūnas, the Chief of the General Staff of Lithuania, refused to support it. The coup was planned for early July when Smetona and his wife were visiting Lipová-lázně resort in Czechoslovakia.

Another coup was planned in June 1930 to take place on 24 July 1930. A key conspirator was aviation captain Antanas Mačiuika. The plans called for 300–400 voldemarininkai to march to President Smetona and demand the reinstatement of Voldemaras as Prime Minister. General Povilas Plechavičius later testified that he was offered to lead the coup, but he refused. When the coup failed, Voldemaras was forcibly exiled to Plateliai on 24 July 1930.

Voldemarininkai then planned another coup during the traditional celebration of Grand Duchess Birutė in Palanga on 15 August 1930. Soldiers of the 7th Infantry Regiment from Klaipėda were to arrest Smetona on his way to the festivities. However, Smetona was warned in time and remained in Kaunas. The First Lady Sofija Smetonienė and several government ministers attended the celebrations instead.

=== Attempted assassination of Steponas Rusteika ===
Steponas Rusteika, chief of the criminal police who exiled Voldemaras and warned Smetona not to travel to Palanga, became the next target of voldemarininkai. Rusteika was a member of Iron Wolf but remained loyal to Smetona and, in the eyes of voldemarininkai, was a traitor who deserved the death penalty. An attempt on his life was made on 19 August 1930 by Julius Vaitkevičius and Antanas Pupaleigis. Rusteika was hit in the head with a revolver and stabbed, but escaped with relatively minor injuries.

The government then arrested Voldemaras and 24 of his most active supporters. Their trial started on 17 August and continued to 31 August 1931. Only three defendants received prison sentences; Rusteika's attackers Vaitkevičius and Pupaleigis received 15 and 12 years, respectively, and captain Juozas Gineitis received one year. Voldemaras was acquitted, while others received mostly suspended prison sentences. After six years in prison, Vaitkevičius received a presidential pardon and was released.

== Attempted coup in June 1934 ==
=== Coup background ===
After the failed attempts in 1930 and the trial in 1931, voldemarininkai were relatively quiet until 1934. Voldemaras lived in exile while the police closely monitored the most prominent voldemarininkai. Nevertheless, voldemarininkai began returning from internal exile and reestablishing their contacts with the military. Many of the younger officers supported Voldemaras. Jonas Karutis even managed to reestablish voldemarininkai newspaper Tautos kelias (later Tautos balsas). In February 1934, Voldemaras published an article in Tautos balsas criticizing the government policies in the Klaipėda Region and worsening relations with Nazi Germany. For this article, Voldemaras faced a trial which was to convene on 12 June 1934.

During the night of 6 to 7 June 1934, military officers stationed in Kaunas began the coup. About 100 officers and 500–700 soldiers participated. The men captured several strategic sites and sent a delegation to Smetona to negotiate replacing Prime Minister Juozas Tūbelis with Voldemaras. Smetona was supported by some of the officers and refused to negotiate. He could agree to some government changes but flatly refused to consider Voldemaras' return, calling him a "political bandit". Lacking resolve, the soldiers returned to their barracks.

=== Coup aftermath ===
Voldemaras, although there is no evidence that he was involved in planning the coup, was sentenced to 12 years in prison. He was released in 1938 on the condition that he would depart Lithuania. Five people, including Petras Kubiliūnas, were sentenced to death by a military tribunal presided over by Edvardas Adamkavičius. Still, Smetona commuted the sentences to imprisonment, and all five were released in 1937. In total, 111 officers faced disciplinary action (reassignments, demotions, dismissals). However, the government supported the dismissed officers and helped them find new employment. The government feared that financial difficulties would push the disgraced officers into various anti-government organisations.

Smetona replaced the key military commanders with those who demonstrated loyalty during the coup, including those with personal connections to Smetona. The new commanders monitored soldiers' moods more closely and tried to root out any politicking. Prime Minister Juozas Tūbelis (Smetona's brother-in-law) tendered his resignation, but Smetona did not accept it. Instead, a new cabinet of ministers was installed on 12 June 1934. The new government retained the Prime Minister and Minister of Finance Tūbelis, Minister of Internal Affairs Steponas Rusteika, and Minister of Agriculture Jonas Pranas Aleksa.

== Coup plans in 1934–1935 ==
Voldemaras's supporters attempted two other coups in 1934, one in August and one in October. The coup in August was organised by junior officers (primarily Stepas Jakubickas), who, in addition to the political demands of returning Voldemaras to power, wanted to improve the economic and social conditions of junior officers. Authorities discovered the coup before it began, and they tried eight men. Seven of them received prison sentences ranging from 2 to 15 years. However, the government did take steps to improve economic conditions.

In October 1934, voldemarininkai planned to free imprisoned comrades from Kaunas Prison and use force to overthrow the government. Again, authorities discovered the plan, and organisers received prison sentences of 4 to 12 years. Reportedly, this attempt was organized by the State Security Department to identify active members and leaders of voldemarininkai.

Voldemarininkai attempted to stage another coup in December 1935. Authorities also discovered and liquidated it before it began. On 19 January 1936, three of its organisers received death sentences (Jonas Karutis, Petras Skurauskas, and Aleksandras Sinkevičius), but they received presidential pardons and their sentences were commuted to life imprisonment. However, all three were released in 1938. The other four coup organisers received prison sentences of 8 to 15 years, while two were acquitted.

== Anti-Smetona coalition ==
=== Axis ===
As tensions were rising in Europe and Lithuania received an ultimatum from Poland in March 1938, anti-Smetona opposition became more active and began to coalesce. Voldemarininkai also became more active and began planning another coup, but they were quickly discovered. Members of the Lithuanian Christian Democratic Party and Lithuanian Popular Peasants' Union formed an informal coalition known as Axis (Lithuanian: Ašis). By November 1938, thanks to the efforts of Pranas Dielininkaitis, Christian Democrats and Popular Peasants agreed on a joint platform and searched for ways to publicize it. They decided to publish the newspaper Žygis (later Bendras žygis) in the Klaipėda Region because there was no government censorship there. Members of this effort became known as žyginingai after the newspaper. Around this time, voldemarininkai joined the Axis and Algirdas Sliesoraitis, former head of Iron Wolf, agreed to move to Klaipėda. Many members of the Axis were reluctant to ally with voldemarininkai but felt that they needed some military force in case things turned violent.

According to Aleksandras Merkelis, Smetona tried to appease voldemarininkai when two ministers sympathetic to voldemarininkai causes (Kazys Germanas and Jonas Gudauskis) were selected for the new cabinet on 5 December 1938. On 10 December, the Axis organised student protests in Kaunas and Klaipėda. Students, agitated by Juozas Pajaujis-Javis and Leonas Prapuolenis, called for a general strike. There were hopes that the strike would grow into wider civil unrest and that voldemarininkai could rally the military. However, in Kaunas, where the government had greater control, the strike was quickly extinguished. In Klaipėda, strikers held out until mid-January 1939. Leonas Bistras and Pranas Dielininkaitis were arrested and sent to a few months of internal exile.

=== Lithuanian Activist Union ===
On 29 December 1938, a meeting of 37 people established the Lithuanian Activist Union (Lietuvių aktyvistų sąjunga or LAS) in Klaipėda. Sliesoraitis was elected general secretary, while Pajaujis, Valerijonas Šimkus, and Jonas Štaupas became board members. Augustinas Voldemaras, who lived in France at the time, was invited but refused to join the LAS. The LAS took over Bendras žygis, while Sliesoraitis and other voldemarininkai quickly took control of the LAS. The LAS showed clear fascist tendencies and attempted to adopt a militarised structure and discipline.

The LAS attempted to establish contacts with Nazi Germany via Ernst Neumann, chief defendant in the Trial of Neumann and Sass. In exchange for financial and political support which would result in a Voldemaras-led government, the LAS promised that Lithuania would enter a military alliance with Germany and Italy. Germany provided some financial support (2,000–3,000 German marks per month), but did not take the LAS seriously. The LAS was liquidated after the Klaipėda Region was incorporated into Nazi Germany as a result of the German ultimatum to Lithuania of 23 March 1939.

== Coup plan in 1940 ==
At the start of the Invasion of Poland in September 1939, voldemarininkai demanded that Lithuania abandon neutrality and seize the opportunity to capture its historical capital, Vilnius, which Poland had controlled since 1920. When Smetona continued to maintain neutrality, voldemarininkai threatened another coup, but it was disrupted by mobilisation. Augustinas Voldemaras returned to Kaunas from his exile in France at the end of August 1939, but was quickly arrested and left the country by January 1940.

After popular general Stasys Raštikis was removed as the commander of the Lithuanian forces in early 1940, discontent rose among the ranks and voldemarininkai started organising another coup, but voldemarininkai leader lieutenant Antanas Mačiuika opposed the coup. After his death in March 1940, voldemarininkai joined forces with Christian Democrats and planned to arrest Smetona and other government officials, force them to resign, and replace them with a government led by Leonas Bistras. Reportedly, three generals, including Kazys Ladiga, helped organise the coup. The coup kept getting postponed, likely due to a lack of manpower. On the night of 26–27 May 1940, warning bells were rung in the barracks of the 1st Hussar Regiment. Such warning bells signified the start of the coups in 1926 and 1934. The next morning, Lithuanian police arrested eight leaders of voldemarininkai, including Algirdas Sliesoraitis, Jonas Karutis, and Klemensas Brunius. Seven of them were sent to a forced labour camp.

== Soviet occupation ==
When the Soviet Union occupied Lithuania on 15 June 1940, Voldemaras returned to Lithuania but was quickly arrested and died in Butyrka prison in December 1942. The Soviets arrested many other Lithuanian activists and members of the Lithuanian army. Voldemarininkai were listed among groups targeted by the NKVD. A number of voldemarininkai escaped to Germany, where they joined Kazys Škirpa in organising the Lithuanian Activist Front (LAF). There were six or eight voldemarininkai among the 27 founders of LAF.

== German occupation of Lithuania ==
When Germany invaded the Soviet Union on 22 June 1941, Lithuanians organised a anti-Soviet uprising, declared independence, and the LAF formed the Provisional Government of Lithuania. Instigated by Franz Walter Stahlecker, commanding officer of Einsatzgruppe A, a group of voldemarininkai, including Algirdas Klimaitis and Kazys Šimkus, launched the Kaunas pogrom on 25–27 June 1941.

Despite their substantial participation in the uprising and the LAF, no members of voldemarininkai or the Lithuanian Nationalist Union were selected for the Provisional Government. Voldemarininkai became much more active and organised their own political party, the Lithuanian Nationalists Party (Lietuvių nacionalistų partija or LNP), officially established in early August 1941. To support the party, they also reestablished Iron Wolf. It was supposed to be similar to the Nazi SA or SS. Voldemarininkai presented a list of 100 candidates for various police and government jobs to the Provisional Government, but only two men were accepted to advisory roles in the Provisional Government. This fueled voldemarininkai dissatisfaction with the Provisional Government.

On the night of 23–24 July, voldemarininkai and men from the 3rd Company of the Lithuanian TDA Battalion attempted to arrest Kaunas commandant Jurgis Bobelis. As a result of this coup, supported by the Gestapo, voldemarininkai gained control of the Lithuanian forces; Stasys Kviecinskas became the new commandant of Kaunas, while Kazys Šimkus became the new commander of the TDA Battalion. The Provisional Government, deprived of any meaningful power, suspended its activities on 5 August 1941. Voldemarininkai took key positions in the Lithuanian Security Police, TDA Battalions (later reorganised into the Lithuanian Auxiliary Police), and local police forces in the province. Petras Kubiliūnas, leader of the 1934 coup, became the general counsellor, the highest-ranking Lithuanian in the German administration. This facilitated the Holocaust in Lithuania. According to the Jäger Report, the TDA battalion's members killed about 26,000 Jews between July and December 1941.

After August 1941, the Lithuanian Nationalists Party remained the only legal Lithuanian political organisation. Despite its friendliness to the Germans, it was not allowed to publish its own newspaper and was officially closed on 17 December 1941. As activists became disillusioned with the Germans, some former voldemarininkai joined the anti-Nazi resistance. For example, Stasys Puodžius, de facto leader of the Lithuanian Nationalists Party, opposed the mobilisation of Lithuanians into a Waffen-SS unit and died in the Stutthof concentration camp.

== Ideology ==
Voldemarininkai were far-right radical activists who supported fascist ideas and totalitarianism. They sought to ally with Germany and used force in attempts to gain power. Except for the 1935 Suvalkija farmers' strike, all internal disturbances in Lithuania in 1930s were caused by voldemarininkai. They were the radical wing of Smetona's Lithuanian Nationalist Union but did not develop a more distinct ideology.

In Soviet historiography, voldemarininkai were invariably presented and condemned as Nazi collaborators. In independent Lithuania, historian Gediminas Rudis presented the Iron Wolf and voldemarininkai as tools Voldemaras used to advance his political ambitions. More recent scholarship by Kęstutis Kilinskas and Jonas Vaičenonis attempts to show that voldemarininkai had support among the military because junior officers hoped to use Voldemaras to get rid of the older officers who, among other things, were often not Lithuanian.

=== Anti-Semitism ===
In the 1930s, voldemarininkai were anti-Semitic but did not call for violence against the Jews. In its internal documents, Iron Wolf prohibited any excesses against the Jews, but worked on a program to reduce Jewish economic influence and to support Lithuanian-owned businesses (i.e. to "free Lithuanians from economic subjugation by the Jews"). Despite the official program, members of Iron Wolf beat a number of Jews during the night from 1 to 2 August 1929 in the Vilijampolė district of Kaunas. Twelve of the perpetrators were later sentenced to up to nine months in prison.

Despite some pressure from Germany, the Lithuanian Activist Union maintained the same non-violent stance. Their most anti-Jewish action was a petition by students in Kaunas to separate Lithuanian and Jewish students. Historian Romuald J. Misiunas stated that "though anti-Semitism became part of their programme, it was, before the Russian occupation, more a matter of strategy than a primary aim to be pursued above all."

== See also ==
- Plečkaitininkai

== Bibliography ==
- Anušauskas, Arvydas (30 January 2004). "Sovietinis genocidas ir jo padariniai". Tremtis (in Lithuanian). Lietuvos gyventojų genocido ir rezistencijos tyrimo centras.
- Bubnys, Arūnas (1998). Vokiečių okupuota Lietuva (1941–1944) (in Lithuanian). Vilnius: Lietuvos tautinis kultūros fondas. ISBN 9986-757-12-6.
- Bubnys, Arūnas (2004). "The Holocaust in Lithuania: An Outline of the Major Stages and Results". The Vanished World of Lithuanian Jews. Rodopi. ISBN 90-420-0850-4.
- Bukelevičiūtė, Dalia (2010). Lietuvos ir Čekoslovakijos dvišalių santykių dinamika 1918–1939 metais (PDF) (in Lithuanian). Vilnius: Vilniaus universiteto leidykla. ISBN 9789955335283.
- Eidintas, Alfonsas (2015). Antanas Smetona and His Lithuania: From the National Liberation Movement to an Authoritarian Regime (1893–1940). On the Boundary of Two Worlds. Translated by Senn, Alfred Erich. Brill Rodopi. ISBN 9789004302037.
- Eidintas, Alfonsas; Žalys, Vytautas; Senn, Alfred Erich (1999). Tuskenis, Edvardas (ed.). Lithuania in European Politics: The Years of the First Republic, 1918–1940 (Paperback ed.). New York: St. Martin's Press. ISBN 0-312-22458-3.
- ELTA (10 February 1936). "Karo lauko teismo prendimas Karučio, Skurausko, Sinkevičiaus ir kt. byloje" (PDF). Naujienos (in Lithuanian). Vol. 34, no. XXIII. p. 4.
- Gailius, Bernardas (2007). "Prano Šileikos byla (II): Sąmokslų teorija ir praktika". Naujasis Židinys-Aidai (in Lithuanian). 5–6: 259–266. ISSN 1392-6845.
- Jurevičiūtė, Aušra (2003). "Lietuvos kariuomenės kūrėjų savanorių sąjunga ir jos vaidmuo vidaus politikoje 1927–1940 metais". Karo Archyvas (in Lithuanian). 18: 209–255. doi:10.47459/ka.2003.18.7. ISSN 1392-6489.
- Jurevičiūtė, Aušra (2007). "Karo invalidų organizacijos Lietuvoje 1923–1940 m." Kauno istorijos metraštis (in Lithuanian). 8: 7–54. ISSN 1822-2617.
- Kilinskas, Kęstutis (2018). Civilinės ir karinės valdžios sąveika Lietuvoje, 1918-1940 m. (PhD thesis) (in Lithuanian). Vilniaus universiteto leidykla.
- Knezys, Stasys (2000). "Kauno karo komendantūros Tautinio darbo batalionas 1941 m." Genocidas ir Rezistencija (in Lithuanian). 7 (1). ISSN 1392-3463.
- Kulnytė, Birutė, ed. (2007). Lietuvos kariuomenės karininkai 1918–1953 (in Lithuanian). Vol. VII. Vilnius: Lietuvos nacionalinis muziejus. ISBN 978-9955-415-11-4.
- Lukšas, Aras (16 August 2013). "Nevykę "vilkų" žaidimai". Lietuvos žinios (in Lithuanian).
- Markevičius, Kęstutis (2012). Voldemarininkų politinis judėjimas 1929–1934 m. (PDF) (Master's thesis) (in Lithuanian). Kaunas: Vytautas Magnus University.
- Misiunas, Romuald J. (January 1970). "Fascist Tendencies in Lithuania". The Slavonic and East European Review. 48 (110): 88–109. JSTOR 4206165.
- Petronis, Vytautas (2013). "Po sporto priedanga: Radikalus dešinysis judėjimas ir "Geležinio Vilko" Sporto Sąjunga Lietuvoje (1928-1930)" (PDF). Lietuvos istorijos metraštis (in Lithuanian). 1: 101–120. ISSN 0202-3342.
- Petronis, Vytautas (2018). "Guarding the Honor of the Nation and the Prosperity of the State: National Defense of Lithuania "Iron Wolf" (1928-1930)". Journal of Baltic Studies. 2 (49): 215–239. doi:10.1080/01629778.2017.1421241. ISSN 1751-7877.
- Rudis, Gediminas (1992). "Augustinas Voldemaras ir voldemarininkai". Pastabos saulėlydžio valandą. By Voldemaras, Augustinas (in Lithuanian). Vilnius: Mintis. ISBN 5-417-00343-3.
- Rudis, Gediminas (1996). "Jungtinis antismetoninės opozicijos sąjūdis 1938–1939 metais" (PDF). Lietuvos istorijos metraštis (in Lithuanian). ISSN 0202-3342.
- Rudis, Gediminas (1997). "Petro Kubiliūno malonės prašymai (1934–1937 m.)" (PDF). Lietuvos istorijos metraštis (in Lithuanian). ISSN 0202-3342.
- Rudis, Gediminas (1998). "Lietuvos karininkijos nuotaikų 1934 m. analizė" (PDF). Lietuvos istorijos metraštis (in Lithuanian). ISSN 0202-3342.
- Rudis, Gediminas (31 May 2006). "Antisemitinės tendencijos voldemarininkų judėjime 1928–1940 m." (in Lithuanian). International Commission for the Evaluation of the Crimes of the Nazi and Soviet Occupation Regimes in Lithuania. Archived from the original on 11 March 2007.
- Rukšėnas, Alfredas (2021). "Holokaustas Lietuvoje: 1941 m. birželio 25-29 d. žydų pogromai Kaune" (PDF). Genocidas ir Rezistencija (in Lithuanian). 2 (50): 37–79. doi:10.61903/GR.2021.202. ISSN 1392-3463.
- Senn, Alfred Erich (2007). Lithuania 1940: Revolution from Above. Rodopi. ISBN 978-9042022256.
- Stoliarovas, Andriejus (2016). "Vidiniai neramumai Lietuvos Respublikoje 1919–1940 metais" (PDF). Acta Historica Universitatis Klaipedensis (in Lithuanian). XXXII: 99–117. doi:10.15181/ahuk.v32i0.1463. ISSN 2351-6526.
- Svarauskas, Artūras (2006). "Lietuvos politinės dešinės radikalizacija XX a. ketvirtajame dešimtmetyje". Parlamento Studijos (in Lithuanian). 7: 53–72. ISSN 1648-9896.
- Trimonienė, Rūta (December 2017). "Steponas Girdžiūnas-Gegužis" (PDF). Atmintinos datos (in Lithuanian). Genocide and Resistance Research Centre of Lithuania.
- Vaičenonis, Jonas (2003). Lietuvos kariuomenė valstybės politinio gyvenimo verpetuose 1927–1940 (in Lithuanian). Versus Aureus. ISBN 9955-601-04-3.
- Valiukevičius, Augustinas (2020). "Radikalieji Lietuvių nacionalistai – voldemarininkai" (PDF). Kardas (in Lithuanian). 4 (488): 2–9. ISSN 1392-9437.
- Zabielskas, Vytautas (29 January 2024) [2018]. "Stasys Puodžius". Visuotinė lietuvių enciklopedija (in Lithuanian). Mokslo ir enciklopedijų leidybos centras.
