= Stasys Raštikis =

Lithuanian general (1896–1985)

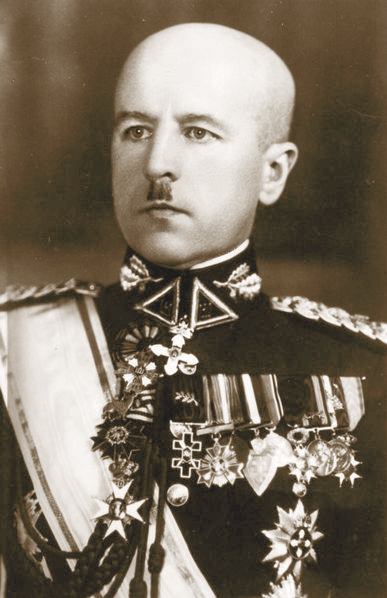
- Born: September 13, 1896; Kuršėnai, Kovno Governorate, Russian Empire
- Died: May 3, 1985 (aged 88); Los Angeles, California, United States
- Burial place: Petrašiūnai Cemetery
- Military career
- Allegiance: Imperial Russian Army (1914–18); Lithuanian Armed Forces (1919–40)
- Service years: 1914–1940
- Rank: Major (August 1927); Papulkininkis (Nov. 1932); Pulkininkas (Nov. 1934); Brigadier general (Nov. 1937); Divisional general (April 1940)
- Commands: Commander of the Lithuanian Army
- Conflicts: World War I; Eastern Front; Caucasus Campaign; Lithuanian–Soviet War

Stasys Raštikis (September 13, 1896 – May 3, 1985) was a Lithuanian military officer, ultimately obtaining the rank of divisional general. He was the commander of the Lithuanian Army from September 21, 1934, to April 23, 1940.

During World War I, he served in the Imperial Russian Army mostly in the Caucasus Campaign. After return to Lithuania in 1918, he joined the newly formed Lithuanian Army and fought in the Lithuanian–Soviet War. He was severely injured and spent 20 months in Soviet captivity. He returned to the 5th Infantry Regiment and later joined the Intelligence Department of the General Staff. The coup d'état of December 1926 brought his future wife's uncle, Antanas Smetona, to power, which propelled his career. Raštikis completed military education in Germany and, after the failed military coup in 1934, became Chief of the General Staff and Commander of the Armed Forces. He undertook an extensive military reform to standardize, streamline, and modernize the army during the period of increasing militarization and rising tensions in Europe. He placed particular attention on soldiers' and officers' education, organizing and personally commanding various military exercises.

Raštikis attempted to distance himself and the army from politics and did not support the ruling Lithuanian Nationalist Union. After the Polish ultimatum of March 1938, Raštikis became Minister of Defense and was increasingly drawn into the political arena. He was a negotiator of the Soviet–Lithuanian Mutual Assistance Treaty by which Lithuania regained a portion of the Vilnius Region but virtually sacrificed its independence. A conflict with Prime Minister Antanas Merkys led to Raštikis' resignation in April 1940. When the Soviet Union presented its ultimatum in June 1940, he was briefly considered for prime minister in the new pro-Soviet People's Government. Fearing arrest by the NKVD, Raštikis escaped to Nazi Germany.

Raštikis returned to Lithuania when Germany invaded the Soviet Union in June 1941. He was named Minister of Defense in the short-lived Provisional Government of Lithuania. However, it soon became clear that the Germans would not allow Lithuanian autonomy, and Raštikis obtained a job organizing army archives at the Lithuanian War Museum. Toward the end of the war, he retreated to Germany and emigrated to the United States in 1949. He taught Russian and Lithuanian languages at the Defense Language Institute in Monterey, California. Raštikis published a four-volume memoir.

== Biography ==
=== Active military duty ===
Raštikis was born in Kuršėnai, but his family soon moved to Dūkštas where his father worked as a sacristan. Raštikis attended primary school in Dūkštas and then a progymnasium in Zarasai. At the time, Lithuania was part of the Russian Empire. At the outbreak of World War I, he volunteered for the Imperial Russian Army and was assigned to the 75th Infantry Regiment stationed in Varėna (part of the 10th Army). In summer 1915, the regiment withstood about ten days of German attacks along Merkys but then began retreating east towards Berezina River. After training in Tula, the regiment was sent to the front in Romania. Raštikis completed training courses with the 10th Army, was promoted to non-commissioned officer, and was sent for further studies to Tbilisi. After graduation, he was promoted to the rank of praporshchik and spent the remainder of the war in the Caucasus campaign with the 279th Infantry Regiment.

After the Russian Revolution, the Imperial Army slowly disintegrated and Raštikis began looking for a way back to Lithuania. Pranas Dailidė, representative of the Council of Lithuania in Caucasus, obtained permission from the Germans for Lithuanian refugees and military personnel to return. Raštikis traveled via ship from Poti to Constanța, spent two weeks in quarantine in a prisoner camp in Pitești, and reached Vilnius in June 1918. Encouraged by his family, Raštikis entered the Catholic Kaunas Priest Seminary. The Lithuanian–Soviet War started in December 1918 and Lithuania began hastily organizing its own army by mobilizing all military officers. Raštikis reported for duty and was assigned to the Vilnius Battalion organized by Kazys Škirpa (later the 5th Infantry Regiment of Grand Duke Kęstutis). The battalion was sent to the front near Žiežmariai and Žasliai on March 31, 1919. On April 27, he saw action near Vievis against the Polish. On August 28, during the final attacks towards Turmantas, Raštikis was shot in the shoulder and leg in the present-day Latvia. He was taken prisoner by the Red Army and spent 20 months in captivity. He was transported to hospitals in Daugavpils and Rybinsk, later to prison camps in Tula and Lubyanka prison in Moscow.

=== From drill instructor to commander of the General Staff ===
Released from captivity in April 1921, Raštikis received a warm welcome in Kaunas – the train with the 17 former prisoners was greeted by guards of honor, a choir, and a banquet hosted by Minister of Defense Konstantinas Žukas. Raštikis was assigned to the same 5th Infantry Regiment, now stationed along the Lithuania–Poland border, as a drill instructor. He broke the same leg that was injured in 1919 – it continued to bother him for the rest of his life – and spent time recovering in a hospital. He returned to the same duties, but due to conflicts with the regiment's commander was reassigned to the Intelligence Department of the General Staff in March 1922. His participation in the Klaipėda Revolt of January 1923 is little understood: he did receive two state awards conferred to participants of the revolt, but his involvement is not mentioned in his extensive memoirs or known from other documents. While working, he attended an evening school and obtained a high school diploma. In 1925, he enrolled in the Kaunas University.

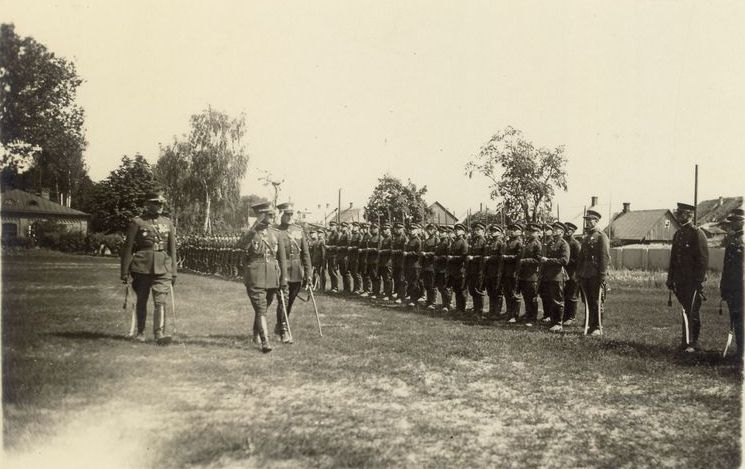
Raštikis inspects Lithuanian troops

During the coup d'état of December 1926, Raštikis was promoted from the director of the Polish Section to the director of the entire Intelligence Department by Povilas Plechavičius. The promotion was made official by a March 1927 decree of Antanas Merkys, Minister of Defense. On August 1, 1927, he was promoted to the rank of major. Raštikis continued his university studies and graduated with a veterinary degree in spring 1929. In June 1929, he married Elena Marija, niece of Antanas Smetona, President of Lithuania. The wedding took place at the St. Michael the Archangel Church, Kaunas and was officiated by Vladas Mironas. This family connection proved instrumental in his future career. From early 1930 to June 1932, Raštikis attended the officer's courses of the General Staff of Reichswehr (German: Führergehilfenausbildung). He did not complete the courses, but obtained a recommendation that allowed him to work at the General Staff. In exchange for the financial support during his studies, he had to complete six years of military duty.

Upon his return, he was promoted to lieutenant colonel (pulkininkas) and assigned to the 5th Infantry Regiment as a trainee of its commander Colonel Juozas Vidugiris. In September 1933, Raštikis took over the command of the regiment. At the same time he lectured at the Higher Officers' Courses (including a course on military history) and contributed to military press becoming a member of the editorial board of Karys, the magazine of the Lithuanian military. In early 1934, mutinous moods spread in the military and commanding officers were reshuffled in an attempt to forestall further disturbances. Raštikis became the commander of the 3rd Infantry Division stationed in Šiauliai. On June 7, 1934, General Petras Kubiliūnas, commander of the General Staff, and other members of the Iron Wolf organization attempted a coup d'état against President Smetona. In an attempt to find trustworthy and reliable officers, Smetona replaced Zenonas Gerulaitis with Raštikis as the director of the General Staff Directorate. At the same time, Jonas Jackus, the new Chief of the General Staff, was ill and resigned in September 1934. Raštikis was promoted in his place. He was also promoted to colonel (pulkininkas) in November 1934. In his memoirs, Raštikis later wrote that he was not satisfied with these promotions as he felt he did not have enough education and command experience.

=== Commander of the Armed Forces ===
==== Military reforms ====
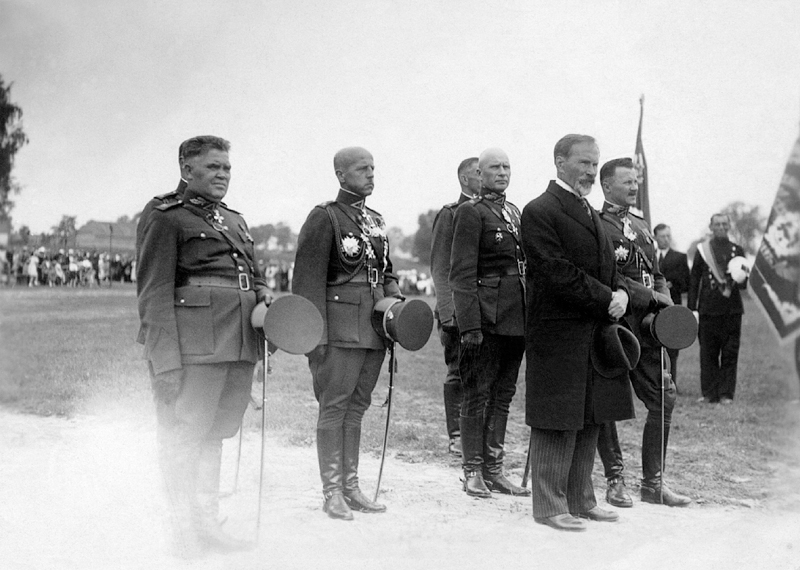
Raštikis (second from left) stands behind President Smetona during a military ceremony in Tauragė in August 1937

The first task of Raštikis as the new Chief of the General Staff was to prepare a military reform. Within a month together with other officers he prepared a proposal which emphasized the need to modernize the army – enlarge armored units, increase anti-aircraft artillery, improve military aviation (led by Antanas Gustaitis), establish the 2nd Engineer Battalion, strengthen officers' education, and other measures. At the same time, the command structure was reorganized to more clearly separate the duties and responsibilities of the Ministry of Defense (political representation, military tribunal, and defense procurement) and the General Staff (command and structure of the army). A new position of the Commander of the Armed Forces was established and Raštikis took the role effective January 1, 1935. One of the goals of the new structure was to make the General Staff less politically involved hoping that it would make the command more stable: there were 20 commanders of the General Staff before Raštikis and the army lagged behind the newest developments. The reforms were opposed by Juozas Tūbelis, Minister of Finance, as they required significant additional funding to the army that already consumed about 18–19% of the Lithuanian budget. But President Smetona approved the reforms, except for the proposed military alliance with Latvia and Estonia, and they proceeded.

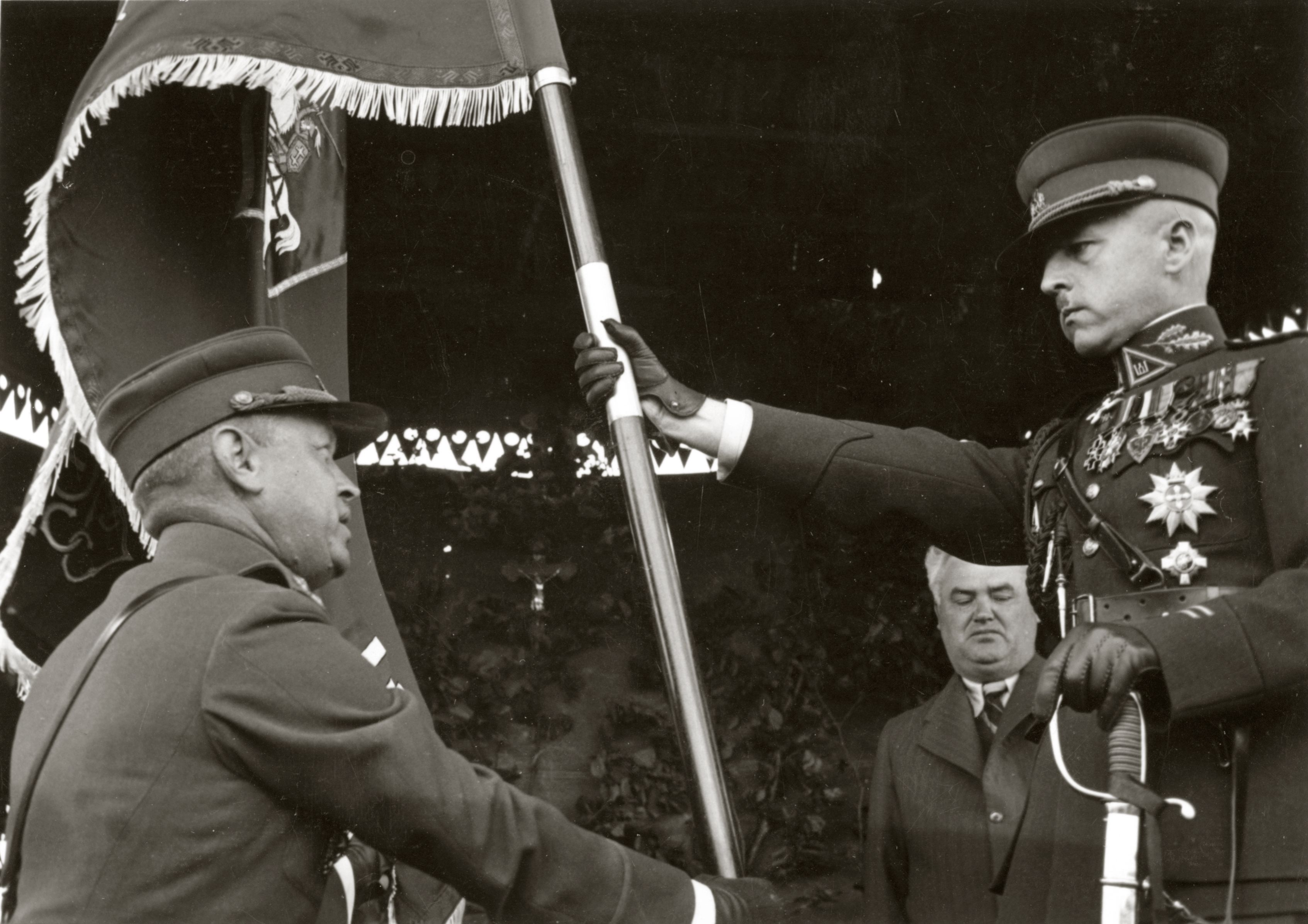
Raštikis with the Lithuanian Armed Forces flag during a ceremony in 1939

Raštikis first undertook the issue of military education. Numerous new statutes were prepared (some 90 statutes were issued in 1935–40) and the education program was revamped to standardize and coordinate activities of the various branches of the armed forces (artillery, infantry, aviation, etc.) Raštikis personally commanded mandatory military exercises and simulations. He emphasized discipline and loyalty within the army and built the trust and authority of the army within the civilian population. He opposed the martial law which was in effect in Lithuania since 1918 as the military was forced to intervene in civilian law enforcement which distracted military officials from their primary duties and earned distrust of the general population. (The martial law was lifted in November 1938 due to German pressure in the months before the ultimatum of March 1939.) The army also acquired new equipment, including light tanks (including 36 Carden Loyd tankettes) and anti-tank and anti-aircraft artillery (including 9 Vickers Model 1931 and 151 Oerlikon 20 mm cannons). The Lithuanian Riflemen's Union was restructured so that it fell more easily at the disposal of the Commander of the Armed Forces. Great efforts were made to reduce the time for mobilization from 8–10 days to less than 48 hours, and to develop comprehensive defense plans code-named L (against Poland) and V (against Germany).

==== Foray into politics ====
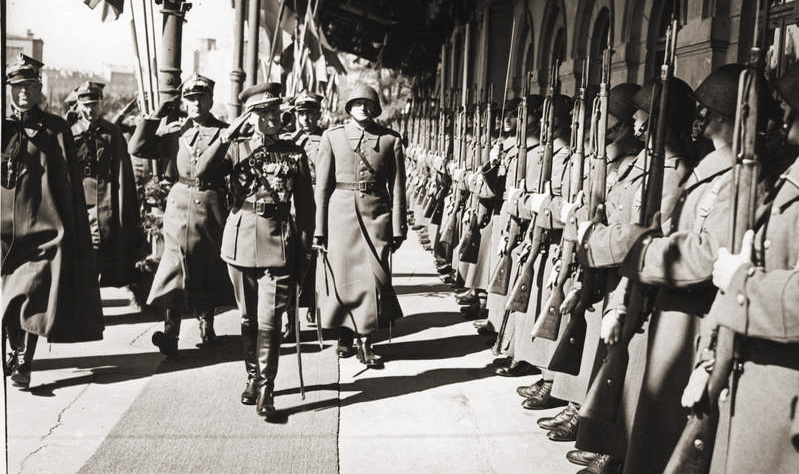
Raštikis during his visit in Poland in May 1939

Raštikis had a tenuous relationship with the Lithuanian Nationalist Union, the ruling political party in Lithuania. He was not a member of the party and was generally favorable to the opposition. The Union disapproved of Raštikis' attempts at keeping the army impartial, his prohibition of officer involvement in politics, and his growing prestige and popularity among Lithuanians. In particular, the Union wanted to turn the Lithuanian Riflemen's Union into the party organ by merging it with Young Lithuania, party's youth organization, but Raštikis opposed such plans and the Riflemen remained open to everyone.

In March 1938, when Poland presented an ultimatum, Raštikis spoke decisively for its acceptance and against armed resistance. In the ensuing government crisis, he became the acting minister of defense in the government of Vladas Mironas. He refused to take the position permanently, perhaps afraid that he would lose the position of the Commander of the Armed Forces. After eight months, he was replaced by Kazys Musteikis. After the German ultimatum in March 1939 and loss of the Klaipėda Region, Mironas's government resigned and Raštikis was offered to become the new prime minister, but refused. The new government included four generals, including Prime Minister Jonas Černius. Raštikis, as Commander or the Armed Forces, had great influence over these ministers, and his relationship with President Smetona became increasingly tense. Smetona resented Raštikis' popularity.

During his tenure, Raštikis made several official visits to foreign countries. In May 1937, Raštikis attended the coronation of King George VI and Queen Elizabeth in London. In February 1939, during the celebration of the 20th anniversary of Estonia's independence, Raštikis visited Johan Laidoner, commander of the Estonian Army, and inspected several Estonian military installations. On his way back, he stopped in Latvia and met with Jānis Balodis and Krišjānis Berķis. More politically sensitive, in light of the two ultimatums, were the visits to Nazi Germany on the occasion of Hitler's 50th birthday in April 1939 and to the Second Polish Republic in May 1939.

==== Start of World War II and resignation ====
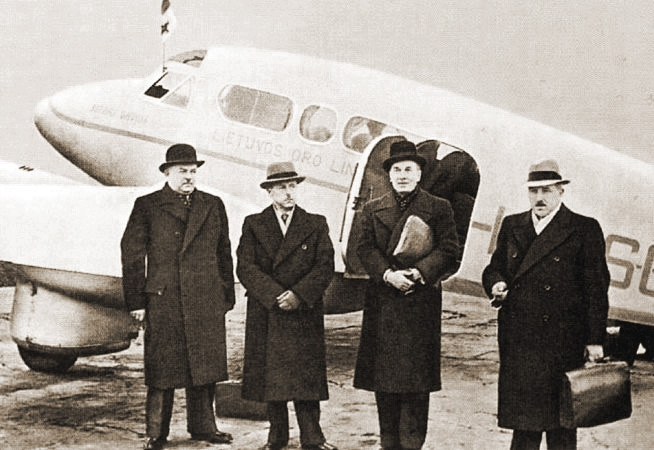
Lithuanian delegation to Moscow (Raštikis is second from left) during the negotiations for the Soviet–Lithuanian Mutual Assistance Treaty

World War II started on September 1, 1939, with the Invasion of Poland. Lithuania declared strict neutrality but, as the war was approaching its borders, it declared and executed partial mobilization on September 17. Citing financial difficulties, the mobilized men were released on October 2. At the same time, negotiations began for the Soviet–Lithuanian Mutual Assistance Treaty: Soviet Union promised to cede a portion of Vilnius Region to Lithuania in exchange for stationing 20,000 Soviet troops in the country. Raštikis was a member of the Lithuanian delegation to Moscow, but he did not lead the Lithuanian troops who entered Vilnius for the first time since 1920 on October 28. It was the first public sign that Raštikis was losing favor with Smetona's regime. In November, Černius was replaced by Antanas Merkys who had been openly critical of Raštikis in the past. In addition to being prime minister, Merkys wanted to become minister of defense (a position he already held in 1919 and 1927), but Raštikis protested and Musteikis retained his post.

Around the New Year, Raštikis published his thoughts on the recent developments in the magazine Kardas. In it, he complained that a mayor (Merkys' position before becoming Prime Minister) or other civil servants earned more than the Commander of the Armed Forces. The issue was taken out of circulation and Raštikis tendered a letter of resignation. However, fearing public backlash, he was officially given a three-month vacation for "health reasons". In his duties, Raštikis was replaced not by his deputy divisional general Stasys Pundzevičius, but by Vincas Vitkauskas who had no higher military education. After the vacation, Raštikis resigned and refused any other military positions. On April 23, 1940, Smetona promoted him to divisional general and accepted the resignation. Raštikis used the free time to visit his family in Dūkštas which was part of the ceded Vilnius Region.

=== Soviet and Nazi occupations ===
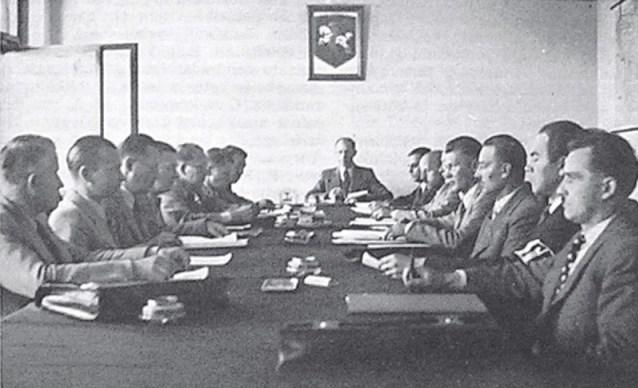
Session of the Provisional Government of Lithuania in Kaunas chaired by Raštikis

As the Winter War between Finland and Soviet Union concluded by March 1940, Soviet Union began increasing diplomatic pressure on Lithuania. Raštikis was invited back to the military, but he agreed only to take the position of director of the Higher War School of Kaunas on June 7. A week later he was called to the emergency government meeting discussing the Soviet ultimatum. He opined that mounting military resistance when Soviet troops were already in the country was impossible. He also opposed diplomatic protests as such empty actions would do no more than antagonize the Russians and invite repressions. In accordance with the Soviet demand of a new more pro-Soviet government (which became known as the People's Government of Lithuania), Raštikis was slated to become the new prime minister, but he was not acceptable to Moscow and the selection of another candidate was supervised by Molotov's deputy Vladimir Dekanozov.

Lithuania lost its independence and was gradually converted into a soviet socialist republic. Concurrently, the Lithuanian army was gradually transformed into units of the Red Army. The work at the military academy ceased when men were called back to their units, but Raštikis was not allowed to resign. He was assigned to the 29th Rifle Corps and appointed deputy chairman of the commission in charge of the liquidation of the Lithuanian military. He was discharged from active duty only on December 20. On February 13, 1941, fearing an arrest by NKVD as an "enemy of the people", Raštikis left his wife and three young daughters in Kaunas and departed towards Germany. It was the last time he saw his daughters who were deported to Siberia in June. He crossed the border during the night of March 19 and was well received by the Germans. With the help of various Lithuanians, he settled in Berlin. There he joined Kazys Škirpa in organizing the Lithuanian Activist Front (LAF). In particular, he edited the statute of LAF and drafted plans on liberating Lithuania.

On June 22, 1941, Germany invaded the Soviet Union. At the same time, Lithuanians organized an anti-Soviet uprising and organized the Provisional Government of Lithuania in hopes of reestablishing independent Lithuania. Raštikis was named as the minister of defense. Together with Heinz Gräfe, an officer with Ausland-SD, Raštikis flew to Kaunas on June 27. He joined the Provisional Government but there was no ministry or army for him to command – as minister of defense he issued only two orders, the second being disbandment of the ministry. According to Raštikis memoirs, he, as a member of the Provisional Government, approached the Kaunas War Field Commandant General Oswald Pohl and the Military Command Representative General Karl von Roques in an attempt to help the Jews, however they replied that the Gestapo was handling these issues and that the German military could not help. The government was not recognized by the Germans and was gradually deprived of any meaningful authority and self-disbanded on August 5. Raštikis was offered a position as General Counsel in the Reichskommissariat Ostland but refused (the position was taken by Petras Kubiliūnas).

Raštikis was left without a job. With the help of General Vladas Nagevičius, he got a job at the Lithuanian War Museum and began organizing army archives. In early 1943, Germans unsuccessfully attempted to organize a Lithuanian Waffen-SS unit and called for a Lithuanian conference to discuss the recruiting. Raštikis was a chairman of the five-member organizational committee for the conference. Once it became clear that the conference was meant only to rubber-stamp German directives, Raštikis and the rest of the committee resigned. The Gestapo started spying on Raštikis due to suspicions that he joined the resistance.

=== Refugee and immigrant to United States ===
In summer 1944, the Eastern Front was closing in on Lithuania and Raštikis and his wife retreated to Regensburg in Germany. He worked at a factory and his wife worked as a nurse. He later got a job at an office of an electrical company until the city fell into the American occupation zone. At that point he joined a Lithuanian Committee and Lithuanian Section of the Red Cross helping Lithuanian refugees. In May 1946, Raštikis and other Lithuanians were moved to a displaced persons camp in Scheinfeld. In May 1949, he and his wife emigrated to the United States.

In the United States, Raštikis obtained a job as a factory worker and became an active member of various Lithuanian American organizations. He delivered speeches and lectures, contributed articles to the Lithuanian press, and participated in various events. In April 1951, he got a teaching position at Syracuse University. He taught the Russian language to military aviation students. From November 1952 to September 1953, Raštikis was employed by the Supreme Committee for the Liberation of Lithuania (VLIK) and lived in London and Reutlingen. He was also associated with the AEPOLE project of the CIA, which was active in 1949–1959 and sought to strengthen anti-communist resistance in Lithuania via radio broadcast, mailing operations, emigre organizations, and political and psychological briefings for legal travelers.

Upon his return to the United States, Raštikis moved to Monterey, California, and joined the Defense Language Institute as an instructor of Russian and Lithuanian. Monterey was far from centers of Lithuanian culture and Raštikis became a lot less active in Lithuanian cultural life. He concentrated on writing his memoirs. He retired in 1968 and died of myocardial infarction in 1985. Originally interred in Los Angeles, his and his wife's remains were returned to Kaunas in November 1993 and reburied in Petrašiūnai Cemetery with full military honors.

== Family ==
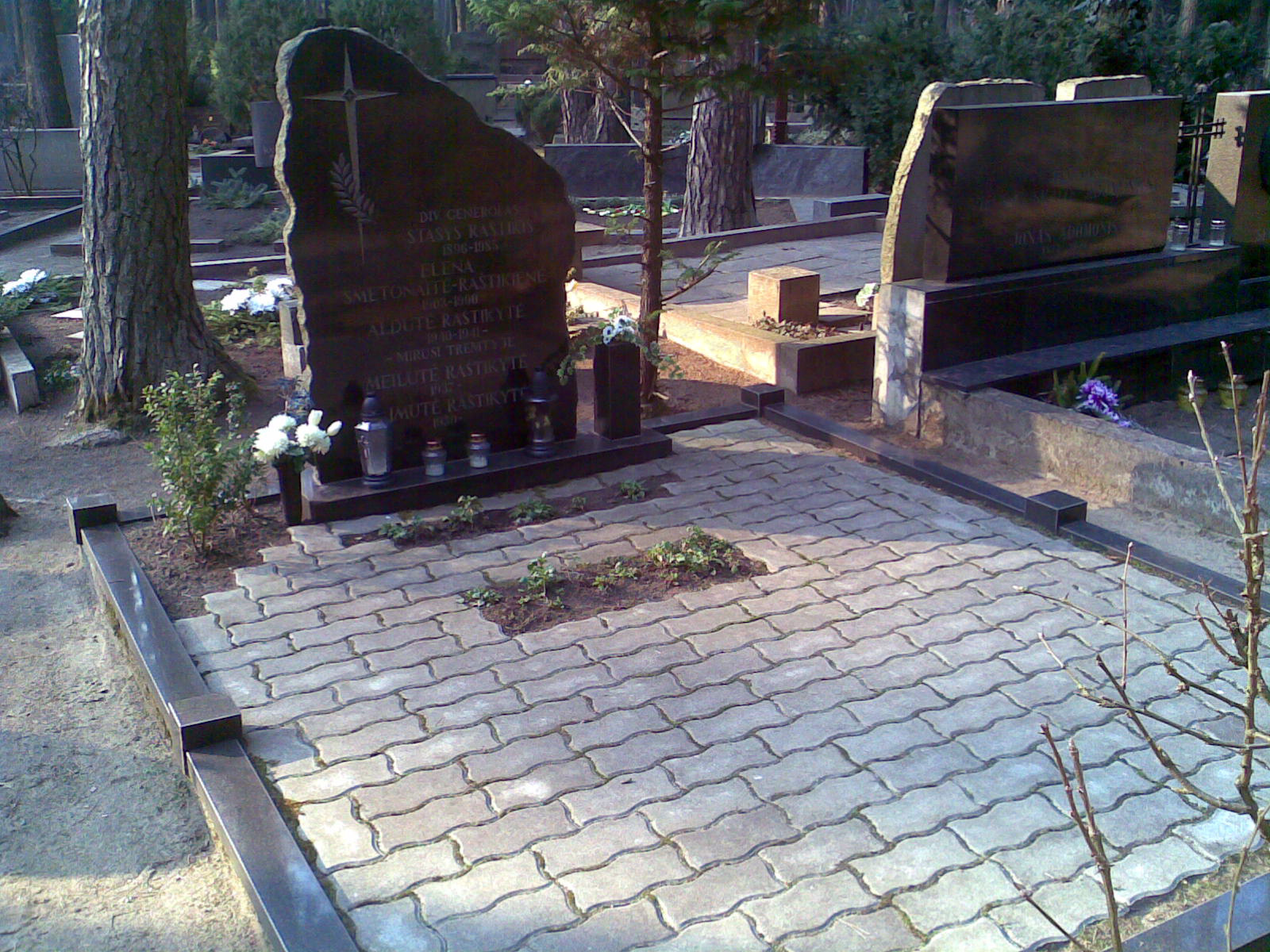
Raštikis family grave at the Petrašiūnai Cemetery

Raštikis married Elena Marija Smetonaitė, niece of Antanas Smetona, on 29 June 1929. She was a teacher and worked in Žiežmariai, Jonava, Kaunas. They had three daughters: Laima, Meilutė Marija, and Aldona. When Raštikis escaped to Germany in February 1941, he left his family behind. His wife was arrested on May 27 and interrogated in an attempt to find out his location. She was imprisoned in Kaunas Prison and awaited deportation to a gulag in Kazakhstan but was freed during the uprising of June 1941. Their daughters (at the time, ages 11, 4, and 1) and their maternal grandparents were deported to Kamen-na-Obi and Pavlovsk in Altai Krai during the June deportation. Other family members were deported as well, including two brothers of Smetonaitė and parents and three siblings of Raštikis, a total of 15 people. The youngest daughter Aldona and her grandfather died in exile.

The two elder daughters and their grandmother were returned to Lithuania in 1946. Agents of MGB made them write letters to Raštikis asking him to return to Lithuania. When the pace of Soviet deportations picked up in 1948, the grandmother was deported to Siberia for the second time and died in exile. Laima and Meilutė went into hiding, changing their names and obtaining fake papers. Meilutė graduated from Kaunas Medical Institute and became a pediatrician. The sisters reconnected with their parents in 1957 and exchanged a few letters. Raštikis died before seeing his daughters again. The sisters visited their ill mother in a Los Angeles hospital in 1989. Smetonaitė died on January 14, 1990.

== Published works ==
Raštikis contributed about 1,000 articles to various Lithuanian newspapers and magazines on various topics ranging from veterinary to military strategy to official proclamations. He wrote five military textbooks. He kept detailed diaries for most of his life. Some of the pre-1941 diaries were destroyed by him to avoid their falling into the Soviet hands, but he recreated some of the key moments as soon as he fled to Nazi Germany in 1941. While in United States, he published four volumes of valuable memoirs:

- Kovose dėl Lietuvos (In the Struggles for Lithuania; two volumes; Los Angeles, 1956 and 1957; Vilnius, 1990)
- Įvykiai ir žmonės (Events and People; Chicago, 1972; Vilnius, 1996)
- Lietuvos likimo keliais (On the Paths of Lithuania's Fate; Chicago, 1982; Vilnius, 1996)

== Selected awards ==
=== Lithuanian awards ===
- Order of the Cross for the Homeland (December 1919)
- Order of the Cross of Vytis (August 1921)
- Order of Vytautas the Great
- Order of the Lithuanian Grand Duke Gediminas
- Independence Medal
- Riflemen's Star of the Lithuanian Riflemen's Union

=== Foreign awards ===
- French Legion of Honour, 2nd degree
- Swedish Order of Vasa, 3rd Class (Commander) (1934)
- Swedish Order of the Sword, 4th Class (Chevalier) (1928)
- Latvian Order of the Three Stars
- Latvian War of Independence 10 Year Medal
- Estonian Order of the Cross of the Eagle, 1st class (February 1939)
- Polish Order of Polonia Restituta, 1st degree

== Bibliography ==
- Anušauskas, Arvydas; et al., eds. (2005). Lietuva, 1940–1990 (in Lithuanian). Vilnius: Lietuvos gyventojų genocido ir rezistencijos tyrimo centras. ISBN 9986-757-65-7.
- Central Intelligence Agency (June 2007). "Research Aid: Cryptonyms and Terms in Declassified CIA Files. Nazi War Crimes and Japanese Imperial Government Records Disclosure Acts" (PDF). The U.S. National Archives and Records Administration.
- Dobkevičius, Kazimieras (2006-09-20). "Pagarba Lietuvos karvedžiui". XXI amžius (in Lithuanian). 70 (1470). ISSN 2029-1299.
- Jankauskas, Juozas (2007-07-04). "Ar visuomet graži išorė reiškia gražų ir turiningą vidų?". XXI amžius (in Lithuanian). 51 (1548). ISSN 2029-1299.
- Jankauskas, Juozas (2010). 1941 m. Birželio sukilimas Lietuvoje: pagrindiniai sukilimo organizatoriai, vadovai, ryšininkai ir pasiuntiniai. Vilnius: Lietuvos gyventojų genocido ir rezistencijos tyrimo centras. ISBN 978-609-8037-05-0.
- Jonaitis, Mindaugas (2012). Struktūriniai pokyčiai Lietuvos kariuomenėje 1934-1940 (Stasio Raštikio reformos) (Bachelor's) (in Lithuanian). Šiauliai University.
- Kalnėnas, Jonas, ed. (1938-03-31). "Nauja Lietuvos vyriausybė. Ministras pirmininkas – Vl. Mironas". Trimitas (in Lithuanian). 13 (902). ISSN 1392-4753.
- Kuodys, Modestas (2011). "Lietuvos visuomenės reakcija į karo padėties atšaukimą šalyje 1938 m. lapkričio 1 d." Istorija. Mokslo darbai (in Lithuanian). 83: 37–45. ISSN 1392-0456.
- Lesčius, Vytautas (2004). Lietuvos kariuomenė nepriklausomybės kovose 1918–1920 (PDF). Lietuvos kariuomenės istorija (in Lithuanian). Vilnius: General Jonas Žemaitis Military Academy of Lithuania. ISBN 9955-423-23-4.
- Lukoševičienė, Regina; Šaparavičienė, Nijolė, eds. (2000). "Raštikis Stasys". Jonavos krašto žmonės (in Lithuanian). Jonava: Linotipas. pp. 142–144. ISBN 9986-9328-5-8.
- Misiunas, Romuald J.; Taagepera, Rein (1993). The Baltic States: Years of Dependence 1940–1990 (expanded ed.). University of California Press. p. 19. ISBN 0-520-08228-1.
- Račkauskas, Kazys (2013-06-21). "Kai Elena Marija Smetonaitė mokytojavo Žiežmariuose". Kaišiadorių aidai (in Lithuanian).
- Ruzas, Vincas (2002). "Karininkai Vyčio kryžiaus kavalieriai 1919-1926". Karo Archyvas (in Lithuanian). 17: 100–143. doi:10.47459/ka.2002.17.4. ISSN 1392-6489. S2CID 240238824.
- Starinskas, Kęstutis (2006-09-16). "Lemtingi metai generolo Raštikio dienoraščiuose". Lietuvos žinios (in Lithuanian).
- Stonys, Marius (2011-05-26). "Generolo Raštikio šeimą visam likusiam gyvenimui išskyrė karas ir perversmai". Santarvė (in Lithuanian).
- Surgailis, Gintautas (1992). Lietuvos kariuomenės vadai (in Lithuanian). Vilnius: Mintis. ISBN 5-417-00513-4.
- Sužiedėlis, Saulius A. (2011). Historical Dictionary of Lithuania (2nd ed.). Scarecrow Press. ISBN 978-0-8108-7536-4.
- Vaičenonis, Jonas (2000). "Lietuvos kariuomenės modernizacija (1926-1939)". Darbai ir dienos (in Lithuanian). 21: 131–176. doi:10.7220/2335-8769.21.8. ISSN 1392-0588. S2CID 253003965.
- Vardys, Vytautas (1973). "Generolo Raštikio memuarai ir jo vaidmuo Lietuvos politikoje". Aidai (in Lithuanian). 4: 145–153. ISSN 0002-208X.
- Vitas, Robert (1984). "The Polish–Lithuanian Crisis of 1938: Events Surrounding the Ultimatum". Lituanus. 20 (2). ISSN 0024-5089. Archived from the original on March 23, 2008.
- Zubreckas, Alfonsas (2003-08-20). "Nepalūžusi gyvenimo audrose. Elenos Raštikienės gimimo 100-osioms metinėms". XXI amžius (in Lithuanian). 63 (1167). ISSN 2029-1299.
