= Lithuanian coup =

Lithuanian coup can refer to:

- 1919 Polish coup d'état attempt in Lithuania
- 1926 Lithuanian coup d'état
- 1934 Lithuanian coup d'état attempt
