= War School of Kaunas =

Historic Lithuanian military academy

Coordinates: 54°51′30″N 23°57′07″E

- Kauno karo mokykla
- Motto: Mūsų ginklas, mūsų mokslas – Lietuvai tėvynei
- Motto in English: Our weapon, our science - for the homeland Lithuania
- Type: Military academy
- Active: January 25, 1919–September 15, 1940
- Affiliations: President of Lithuania (after 1929)
- Commander: Jonas Juodišius (last)
- Students: 4,216 (total graduates)
- Location: Kaunas, Lithuania

War School of Kaunas (Lithuanian: Kauno karo mokykla) was a military school for junior officers in Kaunas, the temporary capital of Lithuania. It was established in January 1919 during the Lithuanian Wars of Independence copying the example of Russian 4-month praporshchik schools established during World War I. Despite difficult circumstances and lack of some of the basic supplies, between March 1919 and October 1920, the school prepared three classes of 434 men who were sent to the front. 15 of these graduates were killed in action. The cadets also participated in suppressing several anti-government coups, including by the Polish Military Organisation in 1919 and by the Voldemarininkai in 1934. As a reliable and loyal force, they were used to guard the Constituent Assembly of Lithuania when it convened in 1920 or the former Prime Minister Augustinas Voldemaras during his trial.

After the wars, the length of study was extended to one year in 1920, two years in 1922, and three years in 1935. Starting in 1926, the school began aspirant courses for the reservists. Courses for more senior officers were offered by the Higher Officers' Courses. From 1932, the school published journal Kariūnas (Cadet) every two months. Before the occupation of Lithuania by the Soviet Union in June 1940, the school prepared 20 classes of 1,631 junior officers and 14 classes of 2,585 reserve officers. The last 21st class graduated already after the occupation. The school was moved to Vilnius and reorganized into an infantrymen school for the Red Army.

== History ==
=== Establishment ===
Lithuania declared independence in February 1918, but began forming the Lithuanian Army only in December 1918 at the outbreak of the Lithuanian–Soviet War. Officers of the new military units were mostly Lithuanians who had served in the Imperial Russian Army during World War I. After the Uprising of 1863, Russian government considered Lithuanians to be unreliable and would not admit them to Russian military academies or promote them to commanding officers. During World War I, due to lack of officers, these restrictions were relaxed and a number of Lithuanians graduated from temporary 4 to 5-month military courses and were promoted to junior officers (usually to praporshchik) though only a few managed to get to more senior positions. Mobilization of these former Imperial Russian officers was announced on 15 January 1919, but only about 400 responded instead of the expected 800 to 1,000.

On the same day, daily Lietuva announced admission procedures to the war school in Kaunas, but at that time the school had neither staff nor premises. Its first director, polkovnik Jonas Galvydis-Bykauskas, was appointed only ten days later. His deputy, Pranas Tvarionas, copied the curriculum from a 4-month praporshchik school he attended in Chistopol, found premises on Donelaitis Street near the St. Michael the Archangel Church, hired lecturers and staff, and acquired supplies from kitchen utensils to textbooks to national coat of arms. British and French Military Representatives provided some limited support; for example, French captain René Cohendet taught physical education while British colonel Henry Rowan-Robinson and General Frank Percy Crozier attended tactical practices. The cadets were initially referred to by a Russian–German term junker until philologist Kazimieras Būga proposed Lithuanian equivalent kariūnas which was officially adopted in May 1922.

Graduates of the War School
Class	Graduation date	Junior officers	Aspirants
1st	6 July 1919	96	
2nd	16 December 1919	224 + 32 aviators	
3rd	17 October 1920	82	
4th	18 December 1921	209	
5th	15 October 1923	79	
6th	28 September 1924	48	
7th	7 September 1925	53	
8th	7 September 1926	21	
	1 December 1926		14
9th	8 September 1927	56	
	30 October 1927		46
10th	8 September 1928	44	
	2 November 1928		86
11th	6 October 1929	44	
	6 November 1929		81
12th	25 October 1930	67	
	1 November 1930		229
13th	24 October 1931	78	
	29 October 1931		475
	15 September 1932		240
14th	31 October 1932	78	
15th	15 September 1933	85	187
16th	15 September 1934	56	144
17th	15 September 1935	59	132
18th	15 September 1936	130	212
	15 September 1937		254
19th	12 May 1938	140	
	27 September 1938		239
20th	16 September 1939	108	
	18 September 1939		246
21st	19 August 1940	72	
	2 October 1940		284
Total		1,829 + 32	2,869

=== First three classes ===
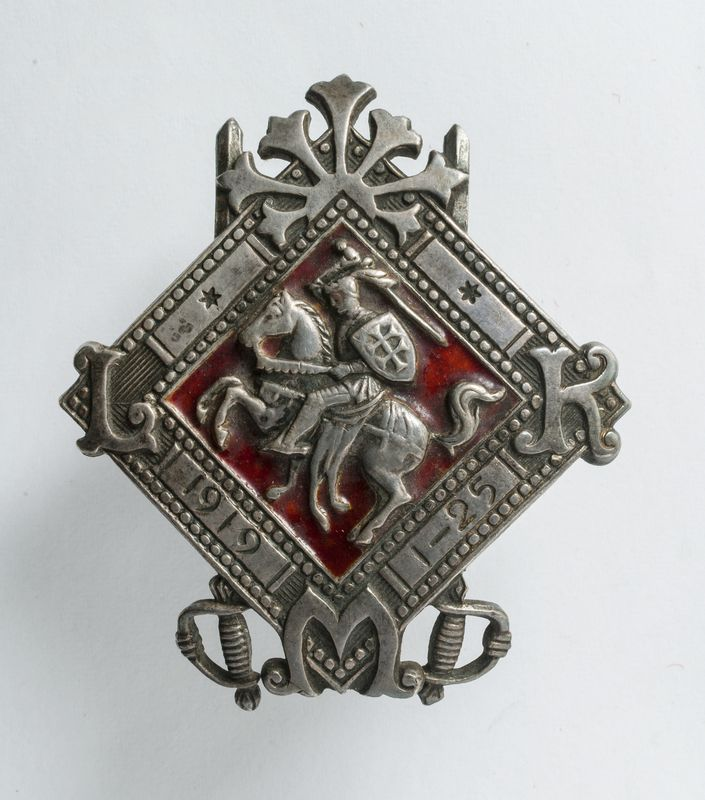
Graduation insignia, 1919

The school began operations on 8 March and on 1 April had an official opening ceremony attended by many officials, including Chairman of the Council of Lithuania Antanas Smetona and Minister of Defence Antanas Merkys. Its first class had 124 cadets who each received a monthly salary of 10 German marks and later 50 Lithuanian auksinas. This class was the youngest: cadets were mostly 17–19-year-olds. Cadets could choose their specialty: infantry, machine gun, artillery, cavalry, pioneer. In addition to their studies, the cadets also guarded various strategic objects if needed and participated in ceremonial events (e.g. inauguration of the first president). 96 of them graduated on 6 July and later were promoted to lieutenants. The class was sent to the front in the Lithuanian Wars of Independence where five of them died and 28 were awarded the Order of the Cross of Vytis.

The second class of 300 cadets began their studies on 31 July 1919. They were chosen from some 800 candidates. Due to particularly difficult situation in the front, the cadets guarded and patrolled Kaunas and participated in the liquidation of the coup d'état attempt by the Polish Military Organisation. Upon graduation on 16 December, 200 men were promoted to lieutenants and 24 to sub-lieutenants. Ten men of the second class died in the front, 15 were awarded the Order of the Cross of Vytis, and 23 received the Order of the Lithuanian Grand Duke Gediminas. The second class was joined by 34 cadets of the Military Aviation School. It was the only class of aviation students as the Military Aviation School was liquidated on 18 December.

The third class of 152 cadets began their studies on 16 January 1920. At the time, there was a lull in the front and the lack of officers was less urgent. Therefore, the length of study was extended to one year. A new school statute was adopted in March which made the school a direct subordinate of the General Staff. When soldiers of Kaunas garrison, affected by poor living conditions and socialist revolutionary moods, began a mutiny on 21–23 February 1920, the cadets were a reliable force that the government could use against the garrison. They also guarded the Constituent Assembly of Lithuania when it convened on 15 May. After Soviet Union handed Vilnius to Lithuania according to the Soviet–Lithuanian Peace Treaty, the school relocated to Vilnius on 25 September. There it took the abandoned building of the former Vilnius Military School of the Russian Empire. However, just two weeks later, it was forced to hastily evacuate back to Kaunas due to the Żeligowski's Mutiny leaving much of its supplies and equipment behind. In order to stop the Polish advance, 75 lieutenants and 7 sub-lieutenants from the third class were sent to the front on 17 October.

=== Post-war curriculum ===
The fourth class was hastily assembled and classes commenced on 15 November 1920. At 400 men it was the largest incoming class, but only 209 graduated on 18 December 1921. Among the graduates were several aviators including Steponas Darius. Since Lithuania was no longer engaged in any active conflicts, the education curriculum was expanded to include greater variety of military specialties and extended to two years starting in 1922. The school reoriented itself from catering to urgent needs of the front to more long-term strategic goals. In December 1922, the school was relocated from the city center to Panemunė which was better suited to military needs. Two companies of cadets of 81 and 69 men participated in the Klaipėda Revolt in January 1923.

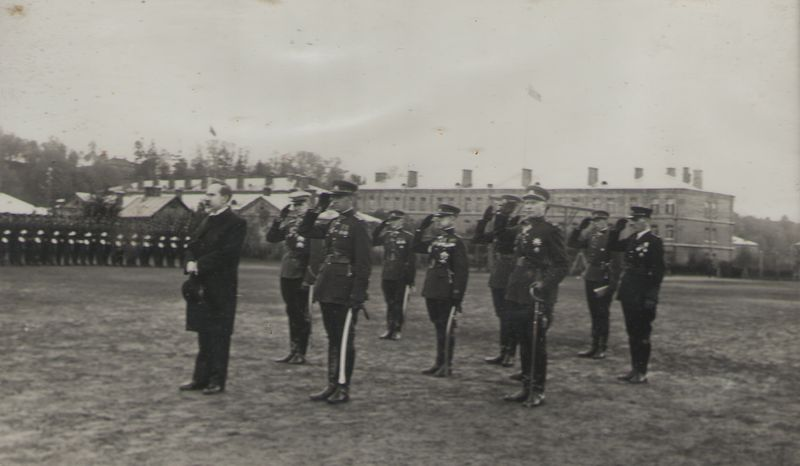
President Antanas Smetona visiting the war school in 1934

To eliminate inconsistencies and contradictions in the curriculum, the War School was temporarily for about two years subordinated to the Higher Officers' Courses in November 1923. Due to the chaotic first years, the curriculum was not well planned and depended for most part on the instructor. As some cadets had only three or four years of prior education, they lacked some basic knowledge of mathematics and other general subjects to master the more specialized military topics such as artillery or topography. Therefore, in 1924, the school began a 3-year preparatory course for those with less than six years of prior education. In 1928, this preparatory course was eliminated reserving admissions only to those with an 8-year school diploma. To gain admission, men had to take and pass exams in Lithuanian language and history as well as pass medical examination. Therefore, only a small number of candidates would be admitted. For example, in 1928, out of approximately 150 applicants only 52 were admitted.

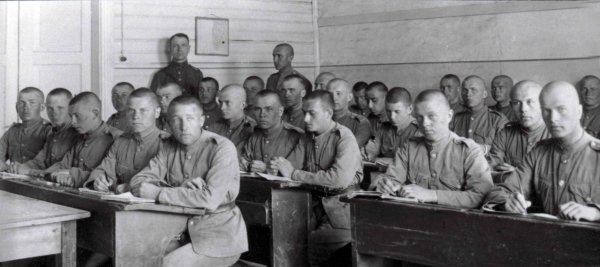
Lectures in 1925

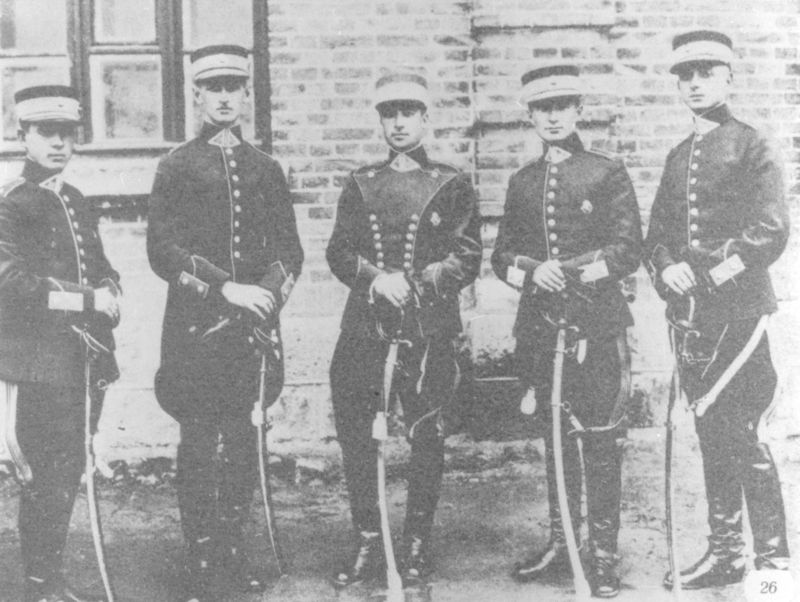
Lithuanian uhlan officers, following their graduation of the school in 1925

Initially, the curriculum lacked such basic classes as military history or military geography due to lack of qualified instructors. However, the curriculum was continuously improved and by 1927–1928 it was comparable to those of similar military schools in other countries. Many officers of the General Staff were assigned a teaching position. In 1924, classes included religious education, tactics, military equipment, machine guns, mortars, shooting range, military administration, military law, military history, topography, fortifications, artillery, Lithuanian language and literature, knowledge of the homeland, physics and chemistry, algebra, trigonometry, typology, hygiene, world history, French and German languages, physical education (gymnastics). In 1932, classes included religious education, general tactics, infantry tactics, military history, military law, military psychology, military organisation, commissariat, topography, pioneer subjects, chemistry, artillery, cavalry, aviation, mortars, heavy machine guns, communications, German language, physical education, dance and singing.

As part of a broader military reform was initiated by Stasys Raštikis, a new school statute was adopted in July 1935. The studies were extended to three years. After an initial 2–3 week training in school, the men would be sent for a 7-month in-the-field training in various regiments. There they familiarized with realities of the armed forces, learned weapons, and participated in field practices. Then they returned to the school to study military history, tactics (general, infantry, artillery, cavalry), military engineering (pioneer), topography, communications, military law, shooting, hygiene, explosives, chemical weapons, physical education, horse riding, religious education, German and Russian languages, dancing and singing, etiquette. During all three years, cadets participated in foot drills. In January 1940, the school had 55 instructors.

=== Aspirant and other courses ===
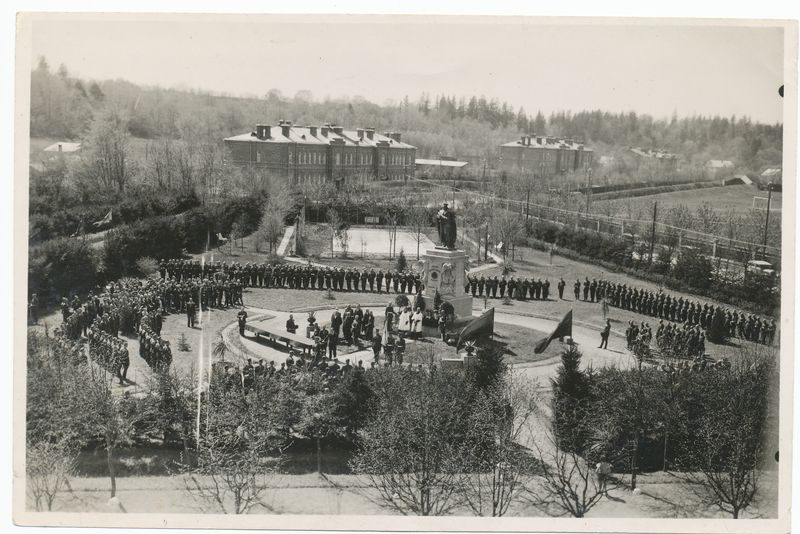
Graduation ceremony in the 1930s, showing the statue of Vytautas the Great

Starting in 1926, the school began aspirant courses for the reservists. The first aspirant class started its studies on 15 January 1926 and 14 men graduated on 1 December. Initially, the aspirant courses lasted for 12 months (two months of initial training in units, 6.5 months of theoretical courses at the War School, and 3.5 practice in units). In spring 1937, the aspirant courses were extended to 15 months. Starting with the fifth class which graduated in November 1930, the number of aspirant students grew substantially to account for the military needs in case of a mobilization. Graduates of aspirant courses were promoted to reserve junior lieutenants or reserve lieutenants. They were offered additional training which could lead to higher rank (up to captain). However, aspirants were criticized for their lack of skills and knowledge – the practical training was too short and skills atrophied few years after leaving the school. If called to serve, they would not be able to capably command their units. There were several discussions and proposals how to reform and improve the aspirant courses.

The school organizer special courses for weapons specialists. Four classes completed this course: 10 men graduated in July 1932, 17 men in 1933, about 30 men in December 1937, and 17 men in May 1940. Topics covered included ballistics, pyrotechnics, functions and maintenance of all the different weapons used by the Lithuanian military. In 1934, after the unsuccessful coup d'état attempt by the Voldemarininkai, the school organized a special 10-month course for aspirant course graduates who after graduation were promised an active military position. Over 300 men applied, but only 110 were admitted. The curriculum, in essence, was the same as the regular 2-year course for cadets, only shortened to 10 months, which did not take into account the previous experience and education of these men. 103 of them graduated on 10 May 1936.

=== Cultural life ===
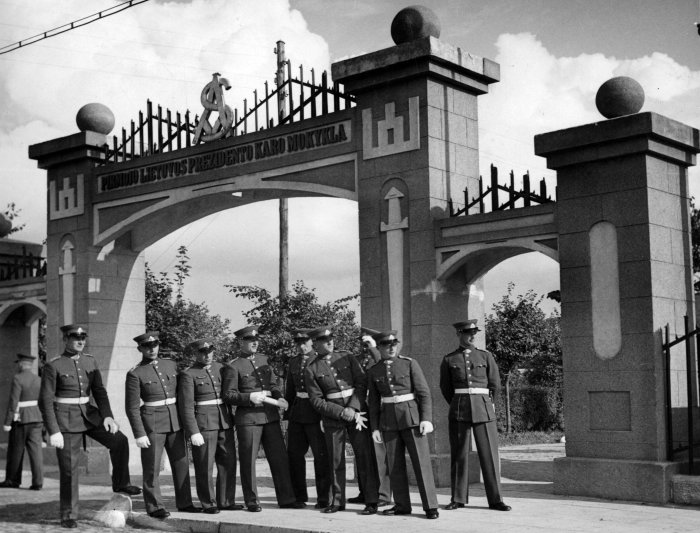
Cadets at the gate of the school in 1938. The gate is decorated with monogram AS for President Antanas Smetona and with Columns of Gediminas.

The school emphasized discipline. The cadets were always required to wear clean and orderly uniforms, more so if making a trip to the city as the school wanted to maintain its reputation among the city residents. Antanas Kučingis, cadet in 1920 and future opera singer, organized singing lessons for the cadets. Each Sunday, the men attended a Catholic mass at the St. Michael the Archangel Church and then marched back to the school singing mainly songs by Maironis and attracting public attention. When the school was moved out of the city center in December 1922, it became less noticeable by the city residents. Nevertheless, the cadets attended every more significant state event and organized annual parades on 16 February (Independence Day) and 23 November (Day of the Lithuanian Army). The school also commemorated 9 October (the start of the Żeligowski's Mutiny in 1920) and 17 December (the military coup d'état in 1926) – alarm was sounded in the middle of the night and the cadets had to dress in full gear to showcase their readiness.

The main event celebrated by the school was the graduation and the promotion of cadets to officers. The first ceremonies were rather simple. They included a Catholic mass, reading of the order promoting cadets to officers, congratulatory speeches by officials, and an official lunch. The first more elaborate graduation ceremony took place in October 1923. After congratulatory speeches, the cadets returned to school where they dressed in their new officer uniforms. President Aleksandras Stulginskis then presented each new officer with a ceremonial sword telling them Do not lift [the sword] without reason, do not lower [it] without honour (Be reikalo nekelk, be garbės nenuleisk). The swords were engraved with the Lithuanian coat of arms and the dates of the major victories of the Lithuanian military since the Battle of Saule in 1236. Later ceremonies added kneeling on one knee when receiving the sword, the president touching one shoulder with the sword, the graduate kissing the sword, and a speech by the valedictorian. Graduating aspirants did not receive the swords.

In 1929, celebrating the school's 10th anniversary, the school was officially renamed as the War School of the First President of Lithuania (Pirmojo Lietuvos prezidento karo mokykla abbreviated as PLP karo mokykla) and President Antanas Smetona became the school's chief. Since then, school's officer and cadet parade uniforms included monogram AS after the initials of Smetona. The president also presented the school with a flag with his image. The flag became a part of the graduation ceremony – the graduating class would transfer the flag for protection to the younger class.

In September 1932, cadets started publishing their own illustrated journal Kariūnas (Cadet). It was published every two months. School director Kazys Musteikis was particularly supportive of the publication.

=== Liquidation ===
World War II started on 1 September 1939 and Lithuania declared partial mobilization on 17 September. The third-year cadets were given orders to report to various units. However, soon the army was demobilized and cadets returned to their studies. In May 1940, the graduating cadets successfully passed final exams and were sent for training to a proving ground north of Pabradė. The training included 502 men who were armed with seven field artillery guns, two Oerlikon 20 mm cannons, two mortars, 12 heavy and 14 light machine guns. On 15 June, the morning after the Soviet ultimatum to Lithuania, the men returned to Kaunas by train via Vilnius. The army, including the War School which had some 600 men, was ordered not to resist the Red Army that was entering the country.

The Soviet Union began the gradual process of turning the Lithuanian Army into units of the Red Army. On 14 August, the Politburo of the Communist Party of the Soviet Union adopted a secret resolution to turn the Lithuanian Armed Forces to the 29th Territorial Rifle Corps and the War School to an infantrymen school for the Red Army. However, changes were evident earlier. Already on 19 June, the school's name and symbols were changed to remove references to President Antanas Smetona. The school also received a political commissar. The graduation ceremony of the 21st class on 15 July was attended by officials, including acting President Justas Paleckis, Minister of Foreign Affairs Vincas Krėvė-Mickevičius, and Minister of Defence Vincas Vitkauskas, but was rather simple. There were no masses or parades, the national anthem was replaced by The Internationale, the ceremonial swords and Lithuanian insignia on uniforms were removed. Officially, 72 graduates were promoted to junior lieutenants and assigned to various units on 19 August 1940.

On 30 August, the Council of People's Commissars of the Lithuanian SSR officially ordered the reorganization of the War School into the infantrymen school. On 12–14 September, the school relocated to Vilnius. Two days later, it officially adopted the statute that was copied from Red Army schools. Cadets showed dissatisfaction with the new regime; for example, they sang Tautiška giesmė or tossed communist posters. Therefore, the Soviets started removing politically unreliable cadets. The school hastened the completion of studies for the 22nd class (69 cadets were assigned to the 29th Territorial Rifle Corps on 15 September). The 23rd class was enlarged by 52 cadets on 8 September only to be dispersed in November. The Russian curriculum did not provide for aspirants and the last class of the reservists graduated on 2 October. On 13 November 1940, the school was officially transferred to the jurisdiction of the Red Army thus marking the official termination of the War School.

On 20 September, Russian polkovnik Georgij Sokurov became the school director. This foreshadowed massive changes in school's personnel: out of 45 officers on 1 September only 18 were left by the end of December. During that time, 56 Lithuanian officers, including General Stasys Raštikis, were temporarily reassigned from their units to the school. In November, two batches of 601 (all Russians) and 454 (about 90% Lithuanians) students were admitted. Lithuanian cadets had to have at least four years of primary education and had to present a reference from the Communist Party of Lithuania, Lithuanian Komsomol, or trade unions. Their length of study was reduced to two years and they were taught by mostly Russian instructors. In early 1941, the school had about 1,000 students, 200 instructors, and 50 political commissars.

This Red Army infantry school evacuated to Vitebsk when Germany invaded the Soviet Union in June 1941. On the way, a few times the cadets engaged with the advancing Germans. Many Lithuanian cadets deserted and on occasion joined the anti-Soviet June Uprising. A report from 15 July stated that 403 men could not be accounted for. Based on incomplete data, three Lithuanian officers and 12 cadets died during the retreat. There is some evidence that three men were executed by the Soviets (Alfonsas Gricius, Vytautas Cijūnėlis, Vaclovas Levūnas). The school later moved to Stalinsk (Novokuznetsk) and continued to train the remaining cadets. The graduates later joined the 16th "Lithuanian" Rifle Division.

== School directors ==
School directors were:

- 1919: Jonas Galvydis-Bykauskas
- 1920–1921: Pranas Tvaronas
- 1922–1926: Jonas Galvydis-Bykauskas
- 1926–1928: Pranas Kaunas
- 1928–1930: Petras Jurgaitis
- 1930–1934: Jonas Jackus
- 1934: Jonas Černius
- 1934: Albinas Čepauskas
- 1934–1939: Kazys Musteikis
- 1939: Kazys Skučas
- 1939–1940: Jonas Juodišius
- Post-occupation:
  - 1940: Vincas Kiršinas
  - 1940: Izidorius Kraunaitis
  - 1940: Georgij Sokurov

== Notable alumni ==
- Jonas Černius, Prime Minister
- Steponas Darius, pilot who died in the attempt to cross the Atlantic Ocean
- Jacob Gens, Jewish head of Vilna Ghetto
- Jonas Noreika, Lithuanian partisan
- Adolfas Ramanauskas, Lithuanian partisan
- Adolfas Šapoka, historian
- Jonas Žemaitis, Lithuanian partisan, posthumously recognized as President of Lithuania

== Bibliography ==
- Ašmenskas, Viktoras (1997). Generolas Vėtra (PDF) (in Lithuanian). Genocide and Resistance Research Centre of Lithuania. ISBN 9986-757-08-8.
- Bubnys, Arūnas; Jegelevičius, Sigitas; Knezys, Stasys; Rukšėnas, Alfredas (2011). Žaldokas, Alfonsas (ed.). Lietuvių tautos sukilimas: 1941 m. birželio 22–28 d. (in Lithuanian). Vilnius: Lietuvos gyventojų genocido ir rezistencijos tyrimo centras. ISBN 978-609-8037-16-6.
- Dobkevičius, Kazimieras (12 March 2009). "Lietuvos ketvirtasis prezidentas. Laisvės Kovos Sąjūdžio vadui, partizanų generolui Jonui Žemaičiui-Vytautui – 100". XXI amžius (in Lithuanian). ISSN 2029-1299.
- Gudienė, Danguolė; Žalienė, Dalia, eds. (2003). Lietuvos kariuomenės karininkai (in Lithuanian). Vol. 3. Lietuvos nacionalinis muziejus. ISBN 9955-415-30-4.
- Jakštys, Gintautas (2013). "Karo mokykla Kauno visuomeniniame ir politiniame gyvenime 1919–1940 m." (PDF). Kauno istorijos metraštis (in Lithuanian). 13. ISSN 1822-2617.
- Jakštys, Gintautas (2014). "Vilniaus pėstininkų mokykla 1940-1941 m. Pastangos Lietuvos kariūnus paversti sovietiniais kursantais" (PDF). Acta humanitarica universitatis saulensis (in Lithuanian). 19. ISSN 1822-7309.
- Jakštys, Gintautas (2015). "Lietuvos karo mokyklos tradicijos (1919–1940 m.)" (PDF). Karo Archyvas (in Lithuanian). XXX. ISSN 1392-6489.
- Jokubauskas, Vytautas (2014). "Lietuvos kariuomenės "R" planas (1939–1940 m.)". Istorija. Mokslo darbai. 93. ISSN 1392-0456.
- Ramanauskaitė-Skokauskienė, Auksutė (27 February 2020) [2011]. "Adolfas Ramanauskas". Visuotinė lietuvių enciklopedija (in Lithuanian). Mokslo ir enciklopedijų leidybos centras.
- Vaičenonis, Jonas (11 November 2019) [2006]. "Karo mokykla". Visuotinė lietuvių enciklopedija (in Lithuanian). Mokslo ir enciklopedijų leidybos centras.
- Žigaras, Feliksas (2007). "Lietuvos kariuomenės karininkų rengimo ir jų kvalifikacijos tobulinimo sistema (1919–1940 m.)". In Ažubalis, Algirdas (ed.). Karo pedagogika lietuvoje (1918–1940 m.) (PDF) (in Lithuanian). Vilnius: Generolo Jono Žemaičio Lietuvos karo akademija. pp. 18–160. ISBN 978-9955-423-58-4.
