= Iron Wolf (organization) =

Lithuanian militarized organization

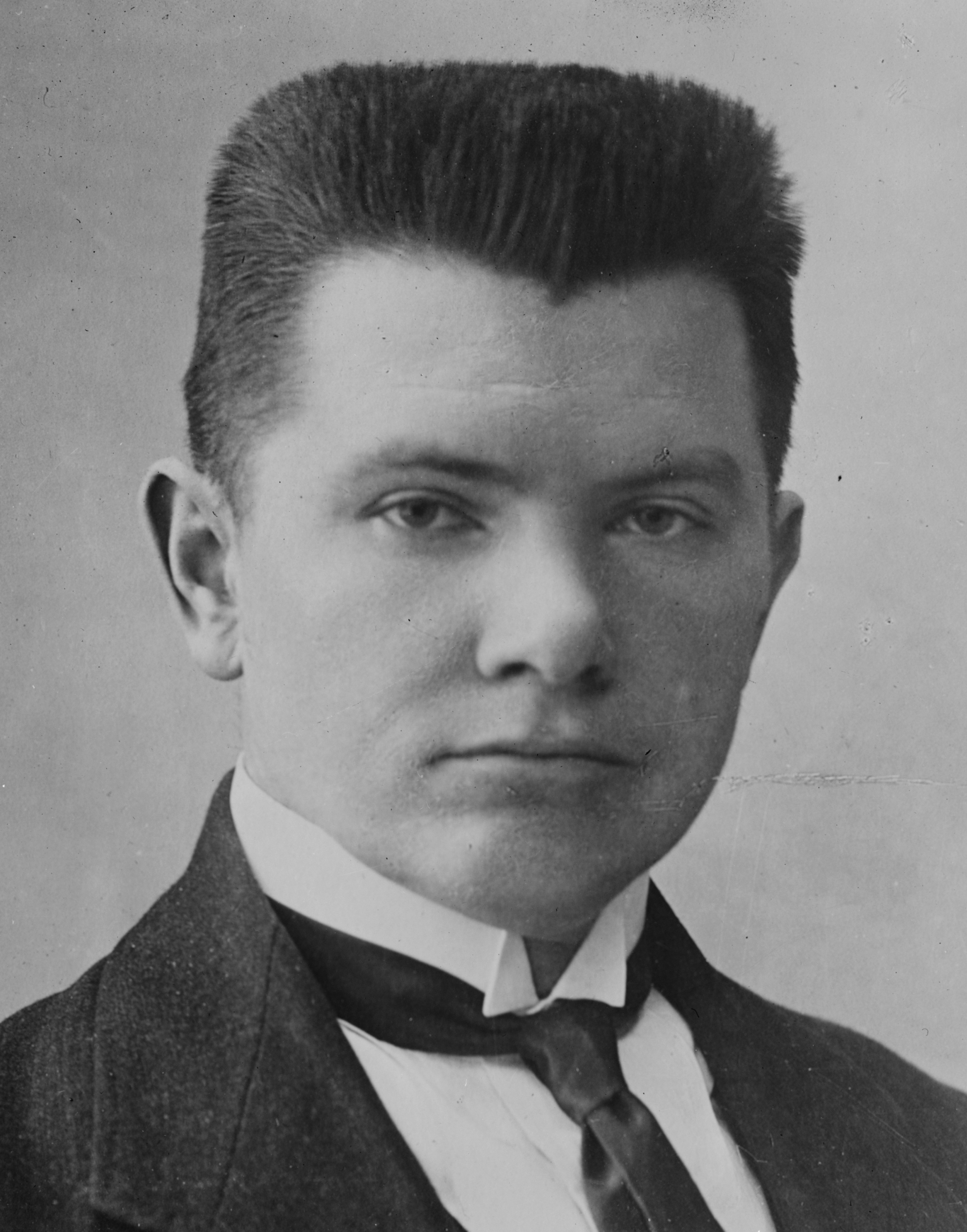
Prime Minister Augustinas Voldemaras, chief of Iron Wolf

Iron Wolf (Lithuanian: Geležinis Vilkas) was a semi-official Lithuanian militarized organization active in 1928–1930, led by Prime Minister Augustinas Voldemaras. Established at the end of 1927 by the ruling Lithuanian Nationalist Union to help suppress its opposition, it was inspired by the Blackshirts, an Italian fascist organization. The organization was secret; it was officially a sports union from May 1928. The organization spied on its political opponents, engaged in limited physical coercion, and launched propaganda initiatives. It had more than 4,000 members.

When Voldemaras was removed as prime minister in September 1929, Antanas Smetona attempted to install his men. When that failed, the organization was officially closed on 24 May 1930. However, supporters of Voldemaras remained active and became known as Voldemarininkai ("Voldemarians", "Voldemarists"). They planned several anti-Smetona coups, became increasingly sympathetic to fascism, and often collaborated with Nazis during the German occupation of Lithuania. Iron Wolf was briefly reestablished in 1941 to support the pro-Nazi Lithuanian Nationalist Party.

== Establishment and organization ==
Iron Wolf membership as of 1 June 1929
By profession	Number	%
Farmers	1,631	39.1%
Government employees	1,024	24.6%
Police employees	551	13.2%
Students	523	12.6%
Craftsmen	192	4.6%
Workers	98	2.7%
Others	145	3.5%
By age	Number	%
Under 21	418	10%
21 to 40	3,426	82.3%
Over 40	320	7.7%
By military service	Number	%
Reserve officers	194	4.7%
Reserve soldiers	2,126	51%
Active military	15	0.4%
No military	1,829	43.9%
Total	4,164	100%

The Lithuanian Nationalist Union came to power as a result of the December 1926 coup d'état. Two unsuccessful counter-coups were staged in 1927, one in March by Juozas Pajaujis and another in September (see Tauragė Revolt). Thus, the nationalists felt insecure. Iron Wolf, named after the howling iron wolf featured in the legend on the founding of Vilnius, was established to help the new regime fight its opponents. The organization was officially established on 8 January 1928 though preparations started few months earlier. It was inspired by the Blackshirts, an Italian fascist organization loyal to Benito Mussolini. Initially, Iron Wolf was a secret organization. On 26 May 1928, it established the Iron Wolf Sports Union, chaired by Jonas Pyragius, which became its public front organization. It was the only militarized sports club in interwar Lithuania. The secret organization, to distinguish it from the legal sports union, was referred to as the National Defense of Lithuania "Iron Wolf" (Lietuvos tautinė apsauga "Geležinis vilkas") or simply Defense (Apsauga). Despite secrecy, existence of Iron Wolf became known.

While its chief was Prime Minister Augustinas Voldemaras, the organization was headed by the Supreme Staff (Vyriausiasis štabas) commanded by Algirdas Sliesoraitis. The structure of Iron Wolf was based on military order and hierarchy. The organization attracted police officers, soldiers, government employees as well as students and teachers. In January 1929, it had about 3,500 members and 1,500 candidates divided into 252 groups. By June 1, it grew to 4,164 members. Iron Wolf was funded from the special government funds by the Ministry of the Interior. Its motto was "Nation's honor and State's prosperity" (Tautos garbė, valstybės gerovė).

== Activities ==
Members of Iron Wolf were assigned one of three main tasks:

- activist (taking verbal or physical action when ordered)
- spying (report on private conversations and infiltrate other organizations),
- propaganda (openly propagate Iron Wolf's ideology).

=== Use of force ===
The members collected information about the political opponents of the new regime and the overall situation and mood of the general public. The reports were forwarded to the Supreme Staff, which decided on further actions. If called, the members were supposed to help the Lithuanian Nationalist Union suppress protests, coups, or other anti-government disturbances. Detail plans were drawn up on rapid response to threats; in this regard Iron Wolf duplicated the functions of the police and the military. It does not appear that these plans were used in practice except, perhaps, on 6 May 1929 when suspects were apprehended after an unsuccessful assassination attempt against Voldemaras.

Members of Iron Wolf used intimidation tactics against political opponents. However, very little is known about the violent activities of Iron Wolf as most of these records were destroyed when the organization was liquidated in 1930. They patrolled city streets, followed activists, on occasion engaged in public scuffles, particularly with members of national minorities (Poles and Jews). There is no evidence that Iron Wolf murdered anyone.

Iron Wolf was suspected of kidnapping and torturing newspaper editor Kazys Bridžius in August 1928. Bridžius refused to submit a complaint to the police and resigned; the newspaper Momentas (Moment) was taken over by members of Iron Wolf. In early 1929, a group of Iron Wolf members vandalized Jewish store signs in Kaunas; this was done without approval from superiors and the perpetrators were threatened with disciplinary sanctions. The number of incidents increased after the May 1929 assassination attempt on Voldemaras. The Supreme Staff lost control of some of the more extreme members and started purging the ranks.

The most serious incident occurred during the night from 1 to 2 August 1929 in the Vilijampolė district of Kaunas. During the day, communists organized a protest and the police arrested 81 people, including 76 Jews. During the night, several men (officially identified as members of the Lithuanian Riflemen's Union) started patrolling the streets and asking Jews for identification documents. When Jews refused, the men started beating every passing Jew. Next morning, 30 Jews submitted a complaint to the police. Initially, the official press of the Lithuanian Nationalist Union defended and excused the perpetrators. But later they were condemned and 17 men were tried in May 1932. Twelve of them were sentenced to prison for two to nine months. While Iron Wolf was not mentioned in any proceedings, behind the scenes Minister of the Interior Ignas Musteikis blamed leaders of Iron Wolf for the failure to contain their men.

Iron Wolf developed a strategy for dealing with its political opponents. Together with the police and other authorities, members of Iron Wolf searched and apprehended members of openly anti-government organizations (e.g. members of the Communist Party of Lithuania or the so-called Plečkaitininkai). Members of the popular and influential Lithuanian Christian Democratic Party and the Lithuanian Popular Peasants' Union were recruited to join organizations established by nationalists – the Lithuanian Catholic Union (Lietuvos katalikų sąjunga) and the Lithuanian Farmers Unity (Lietuvos ūkininkų vienybė). The nationalists did not establish an organization to siphon members of the Social Democratic Party of Lithuania as very few members of Iron Wolf were workers.

=== Propaganda and indoctrination ===
Iron Wolf emphasized and demanded absolute obedience from its members. Iron Wolf declared itself to be an apolitical organization – it did not have a political program and only stood active guard against anti-government threats. However, very quickly leaders of Iron Wolf developed their own ideology that rejected democracy for radicalism and nationalism. Members were required to promote the ideas of Iron Wolf – participate in pro-government gatherings, publish articles, etc. – to create an illusion of the popular support to the new regime. Its propaganda efforts were referred to as the wolfization (suvilkinimas) of the society. From 1928 to December 1929, Iron Wolf published its periodical Tautos kelias (Path of the Nation) twice a month. In total, 84 issues were published. It was a lot more radical than other periodicals published by the Lithuanian Nationalist Union. In this periodical, Iron Wolf did not defend that it was chauvinist but rejected any accusations that it was anti-Semitic. In its internal documents, Iron Wolf prohibited any excesses against the Jews but worked on a program to reduce Jewish economic influence and to support Lithuanian-owned businesses (i.e. to "free Lithuanians from economic subjugation by the Jews"). Tautos kelias published some articles exposing corruption or lack of patriotism based on secret reports submitted to the Supreme Staff. The newspaper was sued several times for publishing false information and slander.

The members were mandated to join the Lithuanian Riflemen's Union which had somewhat similar goals of creating a people's militia. Joining the riflemen allowed members to acquire and practice weapons without raising suspicion. Eventually, Iron Wolf planned to infiltrate the riflemen and "cleanse" it of "ideologically unreliable" personnel. Iron Wolf promoted sports, particularly those that were related to military preparedness. Special attention was paid to shooting sports and weapons instruction. Iron Wolf hired military instructors and requisitioned three machine guns. Starting in fall 1928, Iron Wolf started creating sections of the sports union in various schools to recruit youth into the organization. When Iron Wolf sections were blocked by legal obstacles, the organization worked with school groups organized by Young Lithuania, the youth branch of the Lithuanian Nationalist Union. In April 1929, Minister of Education Konstantinas Šakenis approved school curriculum on military preparedness and removed legal obstacles for Iron Wolf to organize student groups. In parallel, Iron Wolf worked to infiltrate and "cleanse" Dr. Jonas Basanavičius Nationalist Teachers' Union and to remove "non-patriotic" teachers from schools.

== Disestablishment ==
Iron Wolf was loyal to Voldemaras and there were rumors that he might use it to oust President Antanas Smetona. Smetona acted first and removed Voldemaras as prime minister on 19 September 1929. Smetona demanded Sliesoraitis' resignation, but he refused and Iron Wolf split into two – those loyal to Smetona and those loyal to Voldemaras. Supporters of Voldemaras were persecuted and went underground; many other members resigned. On 30 November 1930, the office of the Supreme Staff was bombed, giving Smetona an impetus for a full-scale prosecution of Voldemaras supporters. The Lithuanian Nationalist Union installed new commanders, Kazys Matulevičius and Brunonas Štencelis, who attempted to cleanse and reorganize the severely reduced organization. Tautos kelias was renamed to Mūsų tautos kelias (Path of Our Nation). However, the organization was in total disarray and was officially closed on 24 May 1930. The sports union was disbanded on 7 November 1930.

The old Iron Wolf loyal to Voldemaras continued as an underground group known as Voldemarininkai. In 1934, its members attempted a failed coup d'état against President Smetona. Voldemaras was imprisoned, but was released in 1938 and emigrated to France. Nevertheless, Voldemarininkai continued to be active. They reestablished Iron Wolf after Lithuania was occupied by Germany in 1941. It was supposed to be similar to Nazi SA or SS and support the Lithuanian Nationalist Party (Lithuanian equivalent to the Nazi Party). However, the party was officially closed in December 1941.

== Bibliography ==
- Brandišauskas, Valentinas (25 February 2019) [2008]. "Lietuvių nacionalistų partija". Visuotinė lietuvių enciklopedija (in Lithuanian). Mokslo ir enciklopedijų leidybos centras.
- Knezys, Stasys (2000). "Kauno karo komendantūros Tautinio darbo batalionas 1941 m." Genocidas ir Rezistencija (in Lithuanian). 7 (1). ISSN 1392-3463.
- Petronis, Vytautas (2013). "Po sporto priedanga: Radikalus dešinysis judėjimas ir "Geležinio Vilko" Sporto Sąjunga Lietuvoje (1928-1930)" (PDF). Lietuvos istorijos metraštis (in Lithuanian). 1: 101–120. ISSN 0202-3342.
- Petronis, Vytautas (2018). "Guarding the Honor of the Nation and the Prosperity of the State: National Defense of Lithuania "Iron Wolf" (1928-1930)". Journal of Baltic Studies. 2 (49): 215–239. doi:10.1080/01629778.2017.1421241. ISSN 1751-7877. S2CID 149156249.
- Rudis, Gediminas (24 September 2018) [2004]. ""Geležinis Vilkas"". Visuotinė lietuvių enciklopedija (in Lithuanian). Mokslo ir enciklopedijų leidybos centras.
- Rudis, Gediminas (31 May 2006). "Antisemitinės tendencijos voldemarininkų judėjime 1928–1940 m." (in Lithuanian). International Commission for the Evaluation of the Crimes of the Nazi and Soviet Occupation Regimes in Lithuania. Archived from the original on 11 March 2007.
- Tapinas, Laimonas; et al., eds. (1997). "Tautos kelias" (PDF). Žurnalistikos enciklopedija (in Lithuanian). Vilnius: Pradai. p. 507. ISBN 9986-776-62-7.
