= 7th Infantry Regiment (Lithuania) =

Former Lithuanian Army formation (1919–40)

7th Infantry Regiment of the Samogitian Duke Butigeidis
- Active: January 9, 1919–October 26, 1940
- Country: Lithuania
- Branch: Lithuanian Army
- Type: Infantry
- Size: 1,500 men
- Part of: 3rd Division
- Garrison/HQ: Klaipėda and Šilutė after 1923, also Tauragė after 1934
- Engagements: Lithuanian Wars of Independence (1919-1920): War against Bermontians (Autumn 1919); Polish-Lithuanian War (Summer 1920); Żeligowski's Mutiny (Autumn 1920); Klaipėda Revolt (January 1923)

7th Infantry Regiment and later titled as the 7th Infantry Regiment of the Samogitian Duke Butigeidis was a Lithuanian Army infantry regiment that saw combat in the Lithuanian Wars of Independence. It was formed on 9 January 1919 and disbanded in 1940.

== History ==
The unit began forming on 9 January 1919, when a company was formed from the Kommandantur (Lithuanian: komendatūra) in and around Kaunas. This company later grew to be the Kaunas Battalion. Its commander was the officer J. Petrauskas.

The regiment was founded on 1 July 1919.

=== Lithuanian Wars of Independence ===
==== War against Bermontians ====
In October 1919, the Kaunas Battalion, led by officer Edvardas Adamkavičius, fought against the Bermontians near Baisiogala, Raseiniai and Tauragė.

==== Polish-Lithuanian War ====
On 9 January 1920, a year after the formation's beginning, the battalion was transformed into a regiment, being given the name of the Samogitian Duke Butigeidis. The regiment was moved to Ukmergė to defend the Vepriai-Kurkliai line against the Polish Army. On 15 July, while the Polish were running from the Bolshevik onslaught, a part of the regiment, commanded by lieutenant J. Černius marched into Vilnius, and on August 26, the whole regiment garrisoned Vilnius. Later, the regiment was moved near Gardinas, but after Polish victories, the regiment was driven back to Vilnius. There was a brief respite because of the Suwałki Agreement.

==== Żeligowski's Mutiny ====
Żeligowski's soldiers pushed the 7th Regiment out of Vilnius, from where it retreated towards Ukmergė. In addition to other Lithuanian units, the regiment took part in the Battle of Giedraičiai, where the Polish Army was heavily defeated, stopping its offensive to Kaunas.

According to the plan of the commanding officer of the 7th regiment's battalion Teodoras Balnas, on the night of November 18–19, 200 selected soldiers surrounded the Polish 81st Grodno Rifles Regiment, attacking from the flanks and behind. The Polish unit was surrounded from 3 sides and was severely defeated. The Lithuanians took 200 prisoners of war, 2 artillery guns, 24 HMGs, around 200 wagons, 50 horses, 250 rifles, 9 mortars and 24 field kitchens.

After the end of the war, the regiment guarded the demarcation line in the surroundings of Ukmergė and Trakai.

==== Klaipėda revolt ====
In 1923, parts of the regiment were involved in the Klaipėda revolt, and hence were stationed in Klaipėda and Šilutė. In Klaipėda, the regiment was in formerly German barracks, while in Šilutė, they were in the Macikas Manor.

=== Interwar ===
On 30 April 1934, the regiment's HQ and 2nd Battalion were moved from Klaipėda to Tauragė, and the 1st Battalion was used for the recreation the 6th Infantry Regiment of the Pilėnai Duke Margis.

After a short while, the 7th Infantry Regiment had two battalions again, with a total of 1,500 officers and men serving.

The regiment was part of the 3rd Infantry Division.

== Flag ==
In 1928, the regiment was given a flag of the 3rd class of the Order of Vytautas Cross with the inscription "Meilė Lietuvos mūs žingsnius telydi" (English: Love of Lithuania guides our steps).

== Armament ==
The regiment was armed with M98 rifles and MG 08 machine guns.

== Commanders ==
- 1920 - Colonel Edvardas Adamkavičius
- 1921 - Colonel Julius Čaplikas
- 1923 - Colonel Pranas Kaunas
- 1924 - Colonel Petras Genys
- 1939 - Colonel Antanas Breimelis

== Sources ==
=== Books ===
- Lesčius, Vytautas (2004). Lietuvos Kariuomenė Nepriklausomybės Kovose 1918–1920 (PDF) (in Lithuanian). Vilnius: Generolo Jono Žemaičio Lietuvos karo akademija. ISBN 9955-423-23-4.
- Surgailis, Gintautas (2021). Septintasis pėstininkų žemaičių kunigaikščio Butegeidžio pulkas. Lietuvos kariuomenės istorija (in Lithuanian). Vilnius: Generolo Jono Žemaičio Lietuvos karo akademija. ISBN 978-609-8277-17-3.
- Ruzgas, Vincas, ed. (1932). "VIII. Krašto apsauga". Visa Lietuva: Informacinė knyga 1931 m. (in Lithuanian). Kaunas: Spaudos Fondas.

== See also ==
- 7-asis pėstininkų Žemaičių kunigaikščio Butegeidžio pulkas 1929 metais (video)
- http://www.archyvai.lt/lt/fondai/kariuomene/lcva_f520.html
