= Juozas Pajaujis =

Lithuanian politician (1894–1973)

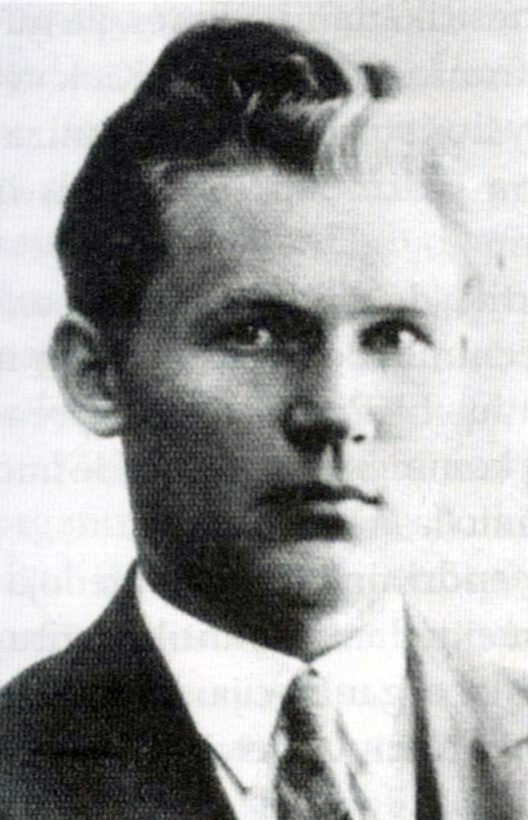
- Born: 14 March 1894; Cyrailė, Congress Poland
- Died: 10 June 1973 (aged 79); New York City, United States
- Other name: Juozas Pajaujis-Javis
- Education: Berlin University; Kiel University
- Occupations: Politician, translator
- Political party: Lithuanian Popular Socialist Democratic Party; Lithuanian Popular Peasants' Union

Juozas Pajaujis (14 March 1894 – 10 June 1973) was a Lithuanian politician, a long-term member of the Lithuanian Popular Peasants' Union, best known for his attempt to organize a coup against the president Antanas Smetona in spring 1927.

Pajaujis received doctorate in sociology and political science from Kiel University in 1926. He was elected to the Third Seimas in May 1926. He became a vocal critic of the coup d'état of December 1926 and started organizing a counter-coup to restore the ousted president Kazys Grinius. However, the plans were discovered and he along with two co-conspirators were sentenced to death in April 1927. His arrest in violation of the parliamentary immunity became the pretext to dissolve the Third Seimas. Pajaujis received presidential pardons and was freed in 1929, but ordered to leave Lithuania.

He returned to Lithuania in 1932 and taught at the Klaipėda Trade Institute. In late 1938, he returned to politics by joining the anti-Smetona coalition, known as Axis, which grew into the Lithuanian Activist Union. After the Soviet occupation in June 1940, Pajaujis was arrested by the NKVD but freed in February 1941 and given a teaching job at Vilnius University. In June 1941, he became the minister of work and social security in the short-lived Provisional Government of Lithuania. Pajaujis retreated to Germany in 1944 and moved to the United States in 1946. He worked at the University of Alaska (1950–1952) and the Library of Congress (1952–1967), and continued to be involved in Lithuanian political life.

== Biography ==
=== Education ===
Pajaujis was born on 14 March 1894 in Cyrailė near the present-day Lithuania–Poland border. His family were modest farmers who had four other children. He attended schools in Sejny and Suwałki, graduating from a commerce school in 1910. He then worked various jobs, including teaching at the first Lithuanian primary schools in Daugai and Varėna. He continued to study independently and passed gymnasium graduation exams as an external candidate in 1917. He then enrolled at the Faculty of Philosophy at the Leipzig University, but he was unable to start the studies due to the German revolution of 1918–1919.

Pajaujis began his university studies at the Law Faculty of Berlin University in 1920. He briefly abandoned the studies in Germany and returned to Lithuania to volunteer for the Lithuanian Army after the Żeligowski's Mutiny in October 1920. He studied at the War School of Kaunas but dropped out before graduating. In 1923, he transferred to Kiel University from which he graduated in 1926. He defended his thesis on the ideas of an economic union in the British Empire and earned doctorate in sociology and political science.

=== Early activism ===
As a school student in Sejny, Pajaujis joined a local group of Aušrininkai, a socialist-leaning group for Lithuanian youth. He published his first article in its magazine Aušrinė in 1912. Starting in 1917, Pajaujis began working with the Lithuanian press. He was a correspondent and editor of foreign news of Lietuvos aidas. According to the memoirs of Petras Klimas, the newspaper's key staff were Klimas, Pajaujis, and Peliksas Bugailiškis. In February 1918, Pajaujis played a role in getting the Act of Independence of Lithuania printed in Lietuvos aidas and hiding copies of the newspaper from the German censors.

In the first government of prime minister Mykolas Sleževičius, Pajaujis led the press and propaganda bureau and worked on recruiting volunteers into the newly established Lithuanian Army. In 1919, he assisted the Lithuanian delegation to the Paris Peace Conference in press affairs.

In August 1919, he attended the International Socialist Conference in Lucerne organized by the Berne International. Pajaujis was a member of the central committee of the Lithuanian Popular Socialist Democratic Party and led its electoral campaign in the April 1920 election to the Constituent Assembly of Lithuania. He was not a candidate in the election due to his university studies in Germany.

=== Seimas ===
Pajaujis was elected to the Third Seimas as a candidate of the Lithuanian Popular Peasants' Union in the May 1926 election. The Peasants' Union and the Social Democratic Party of Lithuania formed a coalition government. Pajaujis became a member of various parliamentary committees, including on economy, foreign affairs, finance and budget, and defence. In fall 1926, as a member of the Lithuanian Chamber of Agriculture, Pjaujis was a member of the Lithuanian delegation sent to Moscow to negotiate the Soviet–Lithuanian Non-Aggression Pact.

Pajaujis became a vocal critic of the coup d'état of December 1926. During the Seimas sessions, he spoke against the execution of four communists blamed for the coup and compared the new cabined of Augustinas Voldemaras to the German occupation during World War I. Pajaujis and several junior army officers began planning an armed counter-coup which would restore democratic norms and reinstate president Kazys Grinius. Pajaujis established contacts with senior lieutenant Erikas Tornau who served in the 1st Hussar Regiment. Tornau then agitated regiment's soldiers via secretary Juozas Žemaitis.

The counter-coup was scheduled for the night of 14–15 March 1927. However, their plans were amateurish and violating rules of conspiracy. The Lithuanian intelligence easily discovered the plans and Tornau was arrested on 14 March. Pajaujis was arrested on 4 April 1927. This caused a crisis between the government and the Seimas, which protested Pajaujis' arrest in violation of the parliamentary immunity. On 12 April 1927, Seimas passed a motion of no confidence in the cabinet of Vodemaras. In response, president Antanas Smetona dissolved the Seimas on the same day. The president had the constitutional right to do so, but new elections had to be called in 60 days. The next parliamentary elections were held only in 1936.

=== Klaipėda ===
Pajaujis and others who planned the coup were tried by a military court. On 28 April 1927, Pajaujis, Tornau, and Žemaitis were sentenced to death but received presidential pardon which commuted the sentence to life imprisonment. In August 1929, Pajaujis received further pardon – he was freed on a condition that he would leave Lithuania. He lived in France for three years and worked as a translator. In 1932, he was allowed to return to Lithuania and live in Klaipėda.

In Klaipėda, Pajaujis worked at an export company and taught at the Klaipėda Trade Institute established by Ernestas Galvanauskas. He attempted to resume political activity and criticism of the authoritarian regime of president Antanas Smetona, but was warned by the State Security Department of Lithuania.

On 11 December 1938, Pajaujis, as a representative of Lithuanian workers and craftsmen, was elected to the Parliament of the Klaipėda Region. On 12 December 1938, Pajaujis attended a student protest meeting at the Klaipėda Vytautas Magnus Gymnasium. As a result, he was dismissed from his teaching position at the Trade Institute.

In late 1938, Pajaujis joined Axis – the voldemarininkai-dominated coalition against president Smetona. Pajaujis mainly worked on its publications, including newspapers Žygis and Bendras žygis. On 29 December 1938, the Axis grew into the Lithuanian Activist Union (Lietuvių aktyvistų sąjunga or LAS). Pajaujis became its board member and director of its propaganda section. On 13 March 1939, the Lithuanian police opened a case against Pajaujis, Ernestas Galvanauskas, Leonas Prapuolenis, and Algirdas Sliesoraitis for organizing a coup. Reportedly, Pajaujis was to be sentenced to ten years in prison, but Lithuanian activities in Klaipėda ceased when Lithuania lost Klaipėda Region to Germany on 23 March 1939.

=== World War II ===
In spring 1939, Pajaujis moved to Kaunas and, after Lithuania gained Vilnius Region, to Vilnius. After the Soviet occupation of Lithuania on 14 June 1940, Pajaujis was arrested by the NKVD on 8 July 1940 and imprisoned at Lukiškės Prison. Thanks to the efforts of Felicija Bortkevičienė, Gabrielė Petkevičaitė-Bitė, and others, Pajaujis was freed on 22 February 1941 and even allowed to teach at Vilnius University, where he continued to work until 1944. He taught economic theory and political economy.

After the German invasion of the Soviet Union in June 1941, Lithuanians organized the anti-Soviet June Uprising. Pajaujis was selected as the minister of work and social security in the short-lived Provisional Government of Lithuania.

In 1944, Pajaujis temporarily sheltered Pesė Lifšicaitė, a young Jewish girl who had survived the Kinderaktion in the Kovno Ghetto on 27 March 1944. For this, he and his wife Emilija were posthumously awarded the Life Saving Cross in 1998.

In early September 1944, Pajaujis, general Teodoras Daukantas, and captain Ignas Vylius were on their way to a meeting in Kaltinėnai between Lithuanian resistance members and German military officials regarding organizing defence against the advancing Red Army. They were injured in a shootout with Soviet forces and received treatment in Klaipėda.

=== United States ===
In 1944, ahead of the advancing Red Army, Pajaujis and his family retreated to Germany. After emigrating to the United States in 1946, he spent six years teaching at the Berlitz School of Languages in New York City. From 1950 to 1952, he taught Russian language and economic geography at the University of Alaska. In 1952, he joined the Library of Congress, where he worked until his retirement in 1967, concluding his career as a senior technical abstractor in the Aerospace Technology Division.

Pajaujis continued to be active in Lithuanian political life. He was a member of the American Lithuanian Council, central committee of the Lithuanian Popular Peasants' Union and its representative at the International Peasant Union.

Pajaujis died on 10 June 1973 in New York City.

== Publications ==
=== Periodicals ===
Pajaujis was active in the Lithuanian press. In 1921, he became one of the founders and editors of the satirical newspaper Kultuvė which was published once a year on the April Fools' Day. He was an editor of the official daily Lietuva (1920–1921) and Klaipėdos žinios (1923). He contributed articles to various periodicals, including Lietuvos žinios, Trimitas, Tautos ūkis, Vakarai. In 1935, he became a correspondent on economy and foreign news for Lietuvos keleivis published in Klaipėda. In 1938, he was one of the editors of the anti-Smetona Bendras žygis.

Pajaujis was a member of the Lithuanian Journalists' Union. In May 1946, he was elected chairman of the reestablished union in Hanau, West Germany (he was replaced by Aleksandras Merkelis in 1947).

In the United States, he contributed articles to Naujienos, Nepriklausoma Lietuva, Sėja. In 1952, he was one of the founders of the magazine Varpas. He also contributed articles to Lietuvių enciklopedija, the Lithuanian encyclopedia published in Boston.

=== Books ===
Pajaujis translated and published several textbooks for Lithuanian schools, including:

- History of the Middle Ages and Modern History by Wincenty Zakrzewski (1919 and 1920)
- General Economic History by Max Weber (1929)
- Foreign Trade and Foreign Trade Policy by Franz Eulenburg (1931)
- A History of Economic Doctrines by Charles Gide and Charles Rist (1932)

He also translated works of fiction, including Penguin Island by Anatole France (1929), The Three Musketeers and its sequel Twenty Years After by Alexandre Dumas (1929 and 1941), A Novelist's Tour of the World by Vicente Blasco Ibáñez (1937).

While living in the United States, Pajaujis wrote two books which were published after his death. His English-language Soviet Genocide in Lithuania (published in 1980) documented Soviet repressions, particularly the Soviet deportations from Lithuania and Gulag camps. He equated Soviet atrocities with the Jewish genocide (cf. double genocide theory). His second book Mirties dekretas demokratijos gynėjams (Death Decree for Defenders of Democracy) about his trial in 1926 was completed by his daughter Danutė Pajaujytė-Anonienė and published by the historian Ričardas Čepas in 2001.
