= 1934 Lithuanian coup attempt =

1934 Lithuanian coup d'état attempt
Date	6–7 June 1934
Location	Kaunas, Lithuania
Result	Coup d'état suppressed

Belligerents
Voldemarininkai	Lithuanian government

Commanders and leaders
Petras Kubiliūnas	Antanas Smetona

Strength
600–800	

Casualties and losses
79 officers disciplined, 5 sentenced to death (sentences commuted)	None

The coup d'état attempt in 1934 (Lithuanian: 1934-ųjų pučas) was an attempt by voldemarininkai, supporters of the former Prime Minister Augustinas Voldemaras, to overthrow the government of President Antanas Smetona. While voldemarininkai planned several coups against the government, this coup was the largest and most threatening.

Voldemaras was ousted as Prime Minister in September 1929, but still enjoyed considerable support among the members of the liquidated Iron Wolf and many younger military officers. On 6–7 June 1934, several hundred soldiers captured several strategic objects, including the General Staff, in Kaunas and sent a delegation to negotiate with Smetona about reinstating Voldemaras and making other changes in the government. The coup was not directed against Smetona, but against the government of Prime Minister Juozas Tūbelis. Other military units and the police remained loyal to Smetona, who refused to negotiate. The rebels lacked resolve and stood down after receiving promises that they would not be prosecuted.

A total of 111 officers faced disciplinary actions; 32 were acquitted, while others were dismissed from the military or demoted. Voldemaras was sentenced to 12 years in prison. Five coup leaders and organizers, including Petras Kubiliūnas, were sentenced to death, but their sentences were commuted to prison sentences. All five later received presidential pardons and were released by 1937. Voldemaras was released in 1938 on the condition that he would depart Lithuania. He chose France and largely faded from public life.

== Background ==
The democratically elected government of Lithuania was deposed during the military coup d'état of December 1926. It was replaced by the government of President Antanas Smetona and Prime Minister Augustinas Voldemaras. After two unsuccessful counter-coups in 1927, the new government felt insecure and established the militarized Iron Wolf organization to help the new regime fight its opponents. Iron Wolf was loyal to Voldemaras and there were rumors that he might use it to oust Smetona. However, Smetona acted first and removed Voldemaras as prime minister on 19 September 1929. The Iron Wolf was officially liquidated but its members remained loyal to Voldemaras and continued as an underground group known as voldemarininkai. In 1929–1934, voldemarininkai planned six coups against Smetona and started one.

== Rising discontent ==
Lithuania was affected by the Great Depression. The agricultural exports plummeted, which stirred up discontent among Lithuanian farmers. At the same time, the funding for the Lithuanian Army was reduced. Many military officers sympathized with or supported Voldemaras. This was particularly true among the younger generation of officers, who compiled lists of "foreign" and thus "unreliable" older officers and tried to push them out of the military. After 1929, Smetona attempted to cleanse the military of Voldemaras supporters. After a few relatively calm and stable years, voldemarininkai began returning from internal exile and reestablishing their contacts with the military. In fall 1933, a group of young officers drafted six points of demands that called for the restoration of the spirit and goals of the December 1926 coup, removal of Prime Minister Juozas Tūbelis, reinstatement of Voldemaras, and reestablishment of the Iron Wolf. The officers were critical of Tūbelis' government, which had been in power since 1929. They saw it as stagnant, incapable, and nepotistic.

In February 1934, Voldemaras published an article in Tautos balsas criticizing the government policies in the Klaipėda Region and worsening relations with Nazi Germany. The article was banned in Lithuania and the issue of Tautos balsas was confiscated, but the article was somehow published in Preussische Zeitung in Germany. Voldemaras faced trial which was to convene on 12 June 1934. In March and May 1934, the democratic governments in Latvia (see 1934 Latvian coup d'état) and Estonia were overthrown. In May 1934, leaflets with the names of people who were allegedly spying for the State Security Department were distributed among the soldiers, causing much disturbance and discontent. At the same time, a delegation of young officers visited Smetona and demanded a government change. Rumors about the planned coup reached the president and the government, but they took little action and only ordered the police in Kaunas to be alert and strengthen its posts.

== Attempted coup ==
Many of the officers participated in the successful coup d'état of December 1926, therefore the coup of 1934 was very similar to the coup of 1926.

During the night of 6 to 7 June 1934, military officers stationed in Kaunas began the coup. They rang alarm bells mobilizing the soldiers. About 100 officers and 500–700 soldiers participated. Officers of the military aviation and hussar units as well as the 5th Infantry Regiment were particularly active.

Using three tanks, the military blocked bridges and the railway station, took control of the General Staff and the central phone station, and encircled the Ministry of Internal Affairs and the State Security Department. These and other strategic objects were taken without resistance. The police hurried to protect the Presidential Palace. It was protected by 127 police officers and 25 presidential guards, armed with carbines and automatic rifles. Voldemaras was flown from Zarasai to Kaunas, but he arrived after the coup had already failed. Petras Kubiliūnas, Chief of the General Staff of Lithuania, acted as a negotiator between the military and the president. There is no evidence that he knew of the coup beforehand but it is clear that he did not attempt to stop it and that he attempted to negotiate on behalf of the rebellious military. His decision to join the rebels is usually explained as a result of his conflict with Minister of Defence Balys Giedraitis who blocked Kubiliūnas' efforts to reform the Lithuanian Army. Giedraitis, who was a cousin of Smetona's wife Sofija, was particularly disliked by the younger officers. Officers saw him as a passive official without proper education or skills.

There were three rounds of negotiations between Smetona and the military. Smetona was supported by some of the officers and refused to negotiate. He could agree to some government changes but flatly refused to consider Voldemaras' return, calling him a "political bandit". Smetona's supporters managed to alert the War School of Kaunas and the 2nd Infantry Regiment. They planned to use artillery to clear the blockade on the Panemunė Bridge leading into the city. Lacking resolve, the soldiers returned to their barracks. In particular, some authors place the blame for the failed coup on Kubiliūnas, who lacked determination and strong will. This sentiment is reflected in bailys (coward) – a codename assigned to him by the State Security Department.

== Aftermath ==
Arrests started in the morning of 7 June. To bring the end to the coup, the president had promised not to prosecute people involved in the coup. To that end, the government passed a special law granting amnesty to the coup participants, but they were still subject to disciplinary actions. In total, 111 officers faced disciplinary action; 32 were acquitted, 5 were reassigned to new units, 6 were demoted, 46 were dismissed from the military, and 22 were demoted to privates and released to reserve. The ceremony demoting the 22 officers to privates took place on 10 July in witness of the 2nd Infantry Regiment and was conducted by the new commandant of Kaunas Kazys Skučas. However, the government supported the dismissed officers and helped them find new employment. The government was afraid that financial difficulties would only push the disgraced officers into various anti-government organizations.

The amnesty did not apply to the coup organizers. Voldemaras, although there is no evidence that he was involved in planning the coup, was sentenced to 12 years in prison on 17 June. Separately, he was tried for the article in Tautos balsas and received a six-month prison sentence in November 1934. He was released in 1938 on the condition that he would depart Lithuania. A military tribunal presided by Edvardas Adamkavičius handed out death sentences to Stepas Gerdžiūnas (reserve officer and member of the Lithuanian Riflemen's Union) and Vytautas Kostas Druskis (former employee of the State Security Department) on 20 June and to Petras Kubiliūnas (Chief of the General Staff of Lithuania), Juozas Narakas (deputy commander of military aviation unit), and Juozas Bačkus (commander of the Hussar Regiment) on 15 July 1934. However, Smetona commuted the sentences to life sentence for Kubiliūnas and imprisonment for 10–15 years for others. All five received presidential pardons and were released in 1937.

Smetona also replaced the key military commanders. Jonas Jackus, the director of the Kaunas War School who hurried to support Smetona, became the new Chief of the General Staff of Lithuania. Petras Šniukšta, a former classmate of Smetona at Mitau Gymnasium, became the new Minister of Defence. Many of the military commanders were also replaced by those who demonstrated loyalty during the coup or by those with personal connection to Smetona. The new commanders more closely monitored soldiers' moods and tried to root out any kind of politicking. For example, officers had to report any contact with officers who were disciplined after the coup. Supporters of Voldemaras attempted to stage two other coups in 1934, one in August and October, but these coups were discovered before they began and the organizers were arrested and sentenced to imprisonment for 2 to 15 years. To address officer shortages, a special 10-month course for reserve officers was organized by the War School of Kaunas. More than 300 men applied but only 110 were accepted and 103 graduated in May 1936.

Prime Minister Juozas Tūbelis tended his resignation, but Smetona did not accept it. Instead, a new cabinet of ministers was installed on 12 June 1934. The new government retained only the Prime Minister and Minister of Finance Tūbelis, Minister of Internal Affairs Steponas Rusteika, and Minister of Agriculture Jonas Pranas Aleksa.

== Bibliography ==
- Eidintas, Alfonsas (2015). Antanas Smetona and His Lithuania: From the National Liberation Movement to an Authoritarian Regime (1893–1940). On the Boundary of Two Worlds. Translated by Senn, Alfred Erich. Brill Rodopi. ISBN 9789004302037.
- Eidintas, Alfonsas; Žalys, Vytautas; Senn, Alfred Erich (1999). Tuskenis, Edvardas (ed.). Lithuania in European Politics: The Years of the First Republic, 1918–1940 (Paperback ed.). New York: St. Martin's Press. ISBN 0-312-22458-3.
- Indrašius, Vytautas (13 February 2018). "Prof. Augustinas Voldemaras tuokėsi Utenoje". Lietuvos aidas (in Lithuanian).
- Kilinskas, Kęstutis (2018). Civilinės ir karinės valdžios sąveika Lietuvoje, 1918-1940 m. (PhD thesis) (in Lithuanian). Vilniaus universiteto leidykla.
- Markevičius, Kęstutis (2012). Voldemarininkų politinis judėjimas 1929–1934 m. (PDF) (Master's thesis) (in Lithuanian). Kaunas: Vytautas Magnus University.
- Petronis, Vytautas (2018). "Guarding the Honor of the Nation and the Prosperity of the State: National Defense of Lithuania "Iron Wolf" (1928-1930)". Journal of Baltic Studies. 2 (49): 215–239. doi:10.1080/01629778.2017.1421241. ISSN 1751-7877. S2CID 149156249.
- Rudis, Gediminas (1997). "Petro Kubiliūno malonės prašymai (1934–1937 m.)" (PDF). Lietuvos istorijos metraštis (in Lithuanian). ISSN 0202-3342.
- Rudis, Gediminas (1998). "Lietuvos karininkijos nuotaikų 1934 m. analizė" (PDF). Lietuvos istorijos metraštis (in Lithuanian). ISSN 0202-3342.
- Stoliarovas, Andriejus (2016). "Vidiniai neramumai Lietuvos Respublikoje 1919–1940 metais" (PDF). Acta Historica Universitatis Klaipedensis (in Lithuanian). XXXII: 99–117. doi:10.15181/ahuk.v32i0.1463. ISSN 2351-6526.
- Trimonienė, Rūta (December 2017). "Steponas Girdžiūnas-Gegužis" (PDF). Atmintinos datos (in Lithuanian). Genocide and Resistance Research Centre of Lithuania.
- Vaičenonis, Jonas (2003). Lietuvos kariuomenė valstybės politinio gyvenimo verpetuose 1927–1940 (in Lithuanian). Versus Aureus. ISBN 9955-601-04-3.
- Žigaras, Feliksas (2007). "Lietuvos kariuomenės karininkų rengimo ir jų kvalifikacijos tobulinimo sistema (1919–1940 m.)". In Ažubalis, Algirdas (ed.). Karo pedagogika lietuvoje (1918–1940 m.) (PDF) (in Lithuanian). Vilnius: Generolo Jono Žemaičio Lietuvos karo akademija. pp. 18–160. ISBN 978-9955-423-58-4.
- Žilinskas, Antanas (3 February 2014). "Dukart nuteistas mirti savanoris". Santaka.lt (in Lithuanian).
