= Petras Kubiliūnas =

Lithuanian general and politician (1894–1946)

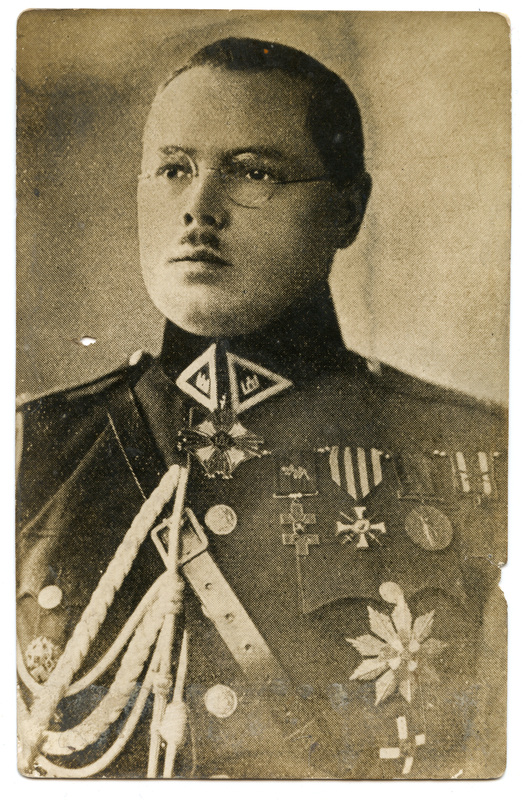
- Kubiliūnas in a Lithuanian uniform c. 1934
- Born: 16 May 1894; Švedukalnis, Russian Empire
- Died: 26 November 1946 (aged 52); Moscow, Soviet Union
- Military career
- Allegiance: Russian Empire; Lithuania
- Branch: Imperial Russian Army; Lithuanian Armed Forces
- Service years: 1914–1934
- Rank: Lieutenant general
- Commands: Chief of the Lithuanian General Staff
- Conflicts: First World War; Lithuanian Wars of Independence

Petras Kubiliūnas (16 May 1894 – 22 August 1946) was a Lithuanian lieutenant general, and Chief of the Lithuanian General Staff in 1929–1934.

During World War I, he served in the Imperial Russian Army. In 1919, he joined the Lithuanian Armed Forces and fought in the Lithuanian Wars of Independence. From 1929 to 1934, he was Chief of the Lithuanian General Staff. He received a death sentence for his role in the anti-government coup of June 1934. However, his sentence was commuted and he was released from prison in 1937. During the occupation of Lithuania by Nazi Germany in 1941–1944, he collaborated with the Nazis and was general counselor of the Generalbezirk Litauen. After the war, he fled to the British Occupation Zone but was kidnapped by NKVD agents and executed in Moscow in 1946.

== World War I ==
Kubiliūnas graduated from the Realgymnasium in Riga and continued his education at Vilnius Military School, graduating in December 1914. During World War I, he served in the Imperial Russian Army in the Eastern Front. He was assigned to the 2nd Riga Battalion of the Latvian Riflemen. He was awarded several Russian orders, including the Cross of St. George, and promoted to captain for his actions during the Christmas Battles in 1916.

In August 1919, Kubiliūnas was mobilized by the Lithuanian Armed Forces and participated in the Lithuanian–Soviet War until December 1919. He commanded a battalion of the 3rd Infantry Regiment and later became deputy commander of the 4th Infantry Regiment. In February 1920, Kubiliūnas was transferred to the 1st Border Guards Regiment, and in 1923, he became a commander of its battalion. In July 1922, he was promoted to colonel (pulkininkas). Kubiliūnas became commander of a tank battalion in January 1924 and a motorized battalion in March 1924.

== Independent Lithuania ==
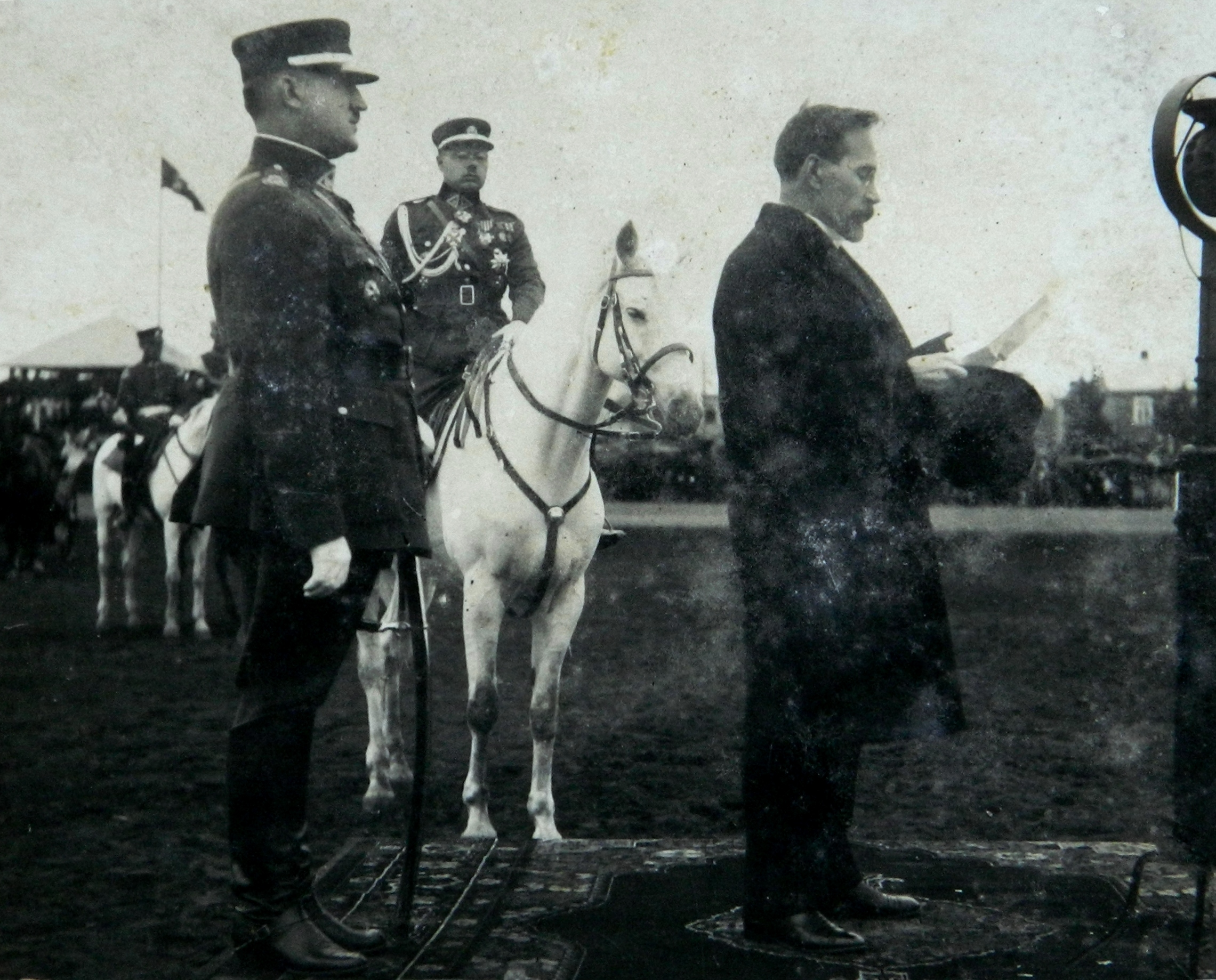
President Antanas Smetona gives a speech, the Minister of National Defense Balys Giedraitis is standing behind him, General Petras Kubiliūnas is sitting on a horse

Kubiliūnas continued his military education; he completed the Higher Officers' Courses in Kaunas in 1925, attended the War College in Prague in 1927, and took courses in Paris in 1929. From August 1927 to July 1934, Kubiliūnas served as an officer of the Lithuanian General Staff. In February 1929, he took the position of the Chief of the Lithuanian General Staff and was promoted to Lieutenant General in November. He was active in military education reforms, helping to transform the Higher Officers' Courses into a higher military school. He actively worked on improving weaponry and military equipment as well as preparing plans for mobilization and military operations. He initiated the establishment of the Gaižiūnai proving ground in 1930.

In 1934, for his support to the unsuccessful coup d'etat against President Antanas Smetona by followers of Augustinas Voldemaras, Kubiliūnas was sentenced to death by a military tribunal. Later, the punishment was changed to a life sentence in a heavy labor prison. Kubiliūnas was released from the Panevėžys Prison in 1937 and lived in his estate in the Šiauliai district.

== World War II ==
After the Soviet occupation in June 1940, he was arrested by the NKVD on 31 July 1940. He was interrogated and accused of counter-revolutionary activities and active suppression of the Communist Party of Lithuania. However, the Soviets lacked evidence and the case dragged on. Kubiliūnas was freed from prison after the revolt against the Soviets in June 1941.

During the occupation of Lithuania by Nazi Germany, he was the general counselor of the Confidence Council (Vertrauensrat), a collaborationist institution formed by the German administration of Generalbezirk Litauen in the Reichskommissariat Ostland, from late August 1941 till July 1944. He was the highest ranking Lithuanian in the German administration. He signed several documents on the forced mobilization of Lithuanians into Nazi SS forces.

Kubiliūnas fled to Germany and reached the British Occupation Zone. He lived on a farm in Bad Bramstedt, Province of Schleswig-Holstein. Soviet NKVD continued to look for "traitors" and kidnapped Kubilūnas in December 1945 or early 1946. There are several versions on how exactly he was kidnapped. He was transported to Moscow where he was interrogated and tried by the Military Collegium of the Supreme Court of the Soviet Union for treason under Article 58-1a of the Penal Code. He was found guilty and sentenced to death on 25 July 1946. The execution was carried out on 22 August 1946. His place of burial is unknown.

== Awards ==
Kubiliūnas received the following awards:

- Order of St. Anna, 4th and 3rd class
- Order of St. Stanislaus, 3rd and 2nd class
- Cross of St. George, 4th class (1916)
- Order of Lāčplēsis (1922)
- Order of the Lithuanian Grand Duke Gediminas, 2nd class (1928)
- Order of the Cross of Vytis, 5th class (1929)
