= Edvardas Adamkavičius =

Lithuanian military officer

Divisional general Edvardas Adamkavičius
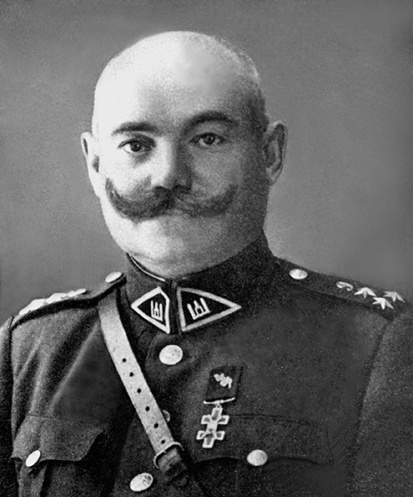
- Adamkavičius photographed with uniform of the Lithuanian Army and Order of the Cross of Vytis in the 1920s–1930s
- Born: 30 March 1888; Pikeliai, Židikai County
- Died: May 10, 1957 (aged 69); Worcester, Massachusetts
- Education: Vladimir Military School of Saint Petersburg (1914); War School of Kaunas (1930)
- Military career
- Allegiance: Imperial Russian Army (1912–1918); Separate Lithuanian Battalion (1918); Lithuanian Armed Forces (1918–1940)
- Service years: 1912–1940
- Rank: Division General
- Awards: Knight's Cross of the Order of the Cross of Vytis (1920)

Edvardas Adamkavičius (March 31, 1888 – May 10, 1957) was a Lithuanian divisional general.

== Early life ==
He was born in Pikeliai, Telšiai County, Lithuania.

== Interwar Lithuanian Army ==
He enlisted in the Lithuanian Army in 1918. He was made a lieutenant general on September 6, 1933, a brigadier general in 1936 and a divisional general on February 16, 1937. He retired in 1940.

== Occupation and emigration ==
After the occupation of Lithuania by the Soviet Union, he fled to Germany. He emigrated to the United States in 1949. He died in Worcester, Massachusetts.

== Family ==
He was the uncle of future President of Lithuania, Valdas Adamkus.

== Bibliography ==
- Visuotinė lietuvių enciklopedija, Bd. 1, S. 73.
