= Pranas Liatukas =

Lithuanian general

Lieutenant general Pranas Liatukas
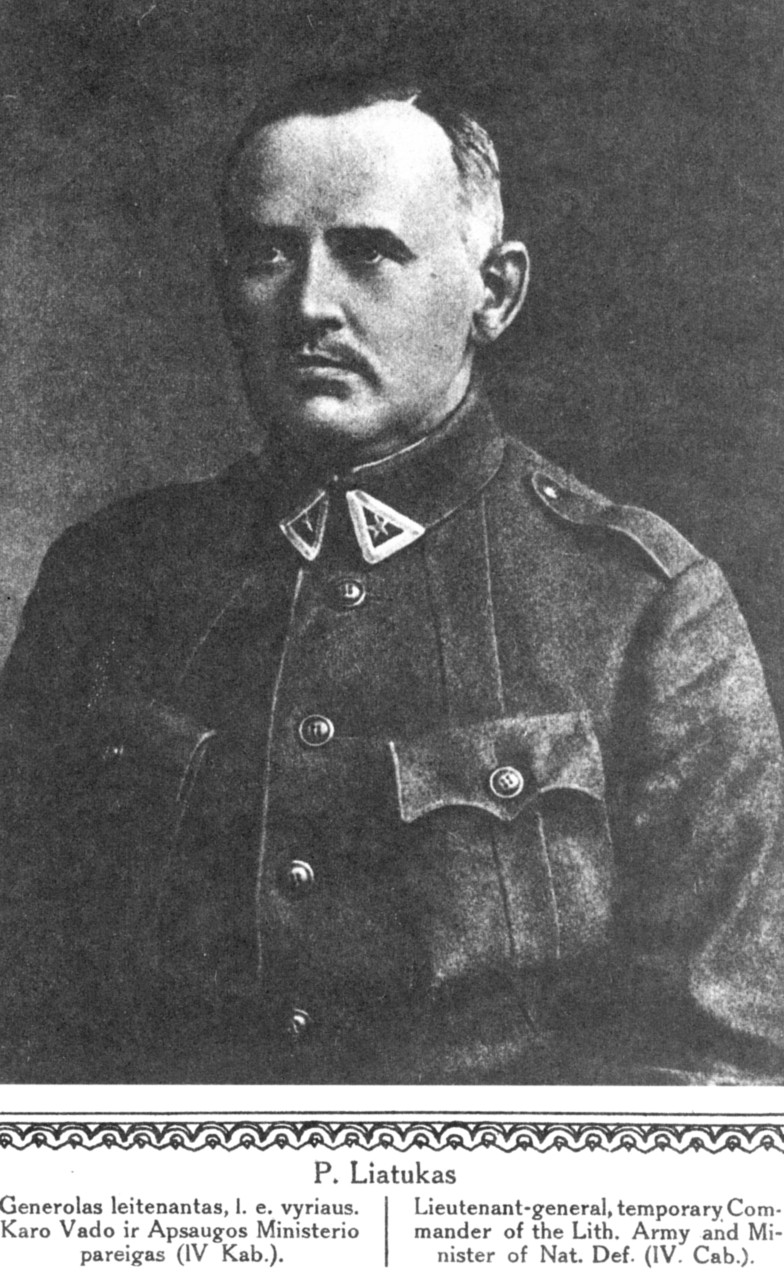
- Liatukas in Lithuania Album
- Born: 29 January 1876; Padievaitis, Russian Empire
- Died: 2 September 1945 (aged 69); Lukiškės Prison, Vilnius, Lithuanian SSR
- Alma mater: Vilnius Military School
- Military career
- Allegiance: Russian Empire (1902–1918); Lithuania (1918–1920)
- Rank: Lieutenant general
- Commands: 2nd Infantry Regiment; Chief of the General Staff; 3rd Infantry Regiment
- Conflicts: World War I Lithuanian Wars of Independence
- Awards: Order of the Cross of Vytis

Pranas Liatukas (29 January 1876 – 2 September 1945) was a Lithuanian lieutenant general. He was the acting commander of the Lithuanian Army from 7 October 1919 to 23 February 1920. At the same time, he acted as the minister of defence.

In 1902, Liatukas volunteered for the Russian Imperial Army and attended the Vilnius Military School. During World War I, he fought with the 80th Infantry Division in the Southwestern Front. He was shell shocked three times, but received Russian military orders and was promoted to polkovnik in September 1917. In 1918, he returned to Lithuania and volunteered for the newly established Lithuanian Army and became Chief of the Defence Staff on 24 December 1918. In March 1919, Liatukas became commander of the 2nd Infantry Regiment but was reassigned to the 3rd Infantry Regiment after soldiers insisted on returning Vincas Grigaliūnas-Glovackis to the command of the 2nd Infantry Regiment.

Liatukas worked to organize the 3rd Infantry Regiment and later joined the Lithuanian offensive in the Lithuanian–Soviet War. In July 1919, Liatukas was appointed commander of the 1st Brigade (1st and 3rd Infantry Regiments and three battalions) that pushed Soviet forces across the Daugava River by the end of August 1919. On 7 October 1919, he was promoted to lieutenant general and given command of the Lithuanian Army. He organized Lithuanian units to fight in the Lithuanian–Bermontian War and ensured that German units withdrew from Lithuania by the end of 1919. He resigned from the commander post on 23 February 1920 after a soldiers' mutiny in Panemunė and retired from the military on 5 August 1920.

Liatukas then worked at the Lithuanian treasury and Bank of Lithuania. He retired in 1926 and lived on a state pension. On 30 January 1945, he and his son Vytautas were arrested by the NKVD. They were accused of participating in the anti-Soviet Lithuanian Freedom Army. Liatukas died in Lukiškės Prison on 2 September 1945.

== Biography ==
=== Early life and education ===
Liatukas was born on 29 January 1876 to a family of Lithuanian farmers in Padievaitis near Kvėdarna which was then part of the Russian Empire (present-day Lithuania). His father owned 45 hectares (110 acres) of land. His mother was from a family of local petty nobles. Liatukas was the eldest of seven children in the family (three brothers and four sisters).

Liatukas attended the four-year Progymnasium in Palanga and the Nicholas I Gymnasium in Riga. In Riga, Liatukas found a small group of Lithuanian students, which included Kipras Bielinis. Together with others, Liatukas demanded to deliver sermons to Lithuanian students in Lithuanian. Liatukas received little support from his family and earned a living by tutoring other children.

=== Russian Imperial Army ===
In October 1902, a year before graduating from the gymnasium, Liatukas volunteered for the Russian Imperial Army and was assigned to the 163rd Lenkoran-Nasheburg Infantry Regiment. In September 1903, he was sent to study at the Vilnius Military School which he graduated as praporshchik in 1905. He was assigned to the 199th Svirsky Reserve Infantry Regiment and served in Medved in the Novgorod Governorate. He was sent to Kronstadt in November 1905 and to Borovichi in August 1907 to maintain public order. In 1908, he was transferred to the 178th Wenden Infantry Regiment in Liepāja. He was promoted to poruchik in September 1909 and to shtabs-kapitan in November 1913.

In July 1914, during the general mobilization, Liatukas was assigned to the newly formed 318th Chernoyarsk Infantry Regiment in Penza as commander of its 15th Company. The regiment was included in the 80th Infantry Division and fought in the Southwestern Front against German and Austrian units. Already in August 1914, Liatukas distinguished himself in battle and was awarded the Order of Saint Anna and Order of Saint Stanilaus. In September–October 1914, he fought in the Battle of the Vistula River and Battle of the San River.

On 21 March 1915, he was promoted to kapitan but two days later he was shell shocked. He recuperated in Kyiv and returned to battle in September 1915 as battalion commander. He was promoted to podpolkovnik in December 1915. He was shell shocked in March 1916 and returned to battle in July 1916. However, just three days later, during the Battle of Kowel near Rudka-Myrynska, he was again shell shocked. He was sent to hospitals in Rostov-on-Don and Kislovodsk. In March 1917, he was assigned to the 319th Bugulma Infantry Regiment as battalion commander. He was wounded in June 1917 in the territory of Romania. He was promoted to polkovnik in September 1917.

=== Lithuanian Army ===
==== Joining the army ====
Liatukas returned to his native village in Lithuania in August 1918. He was elected chairman of a local parish committee. When he learned about the efforts to organized the Lithuanian Army, he traveled to Vilnius and signed up as a volunteer on 5 December 1918. The same day, Liatukas was appointed commander of the 2nd Infantry Regiment which did not yet exist. He did not depart to Kaunas where the regiment was to be formed and remained in Vilnius. At the start of the Lithuanian–Soviet War, a government crisis brought Mykolas Sleževičius to power. The new minister of defence Mykolas Velykis appointed Liatukas as the Chief of the Defence Staff on 24 December 1918. However, at the time it was not a significant position as all issues were handled and decided by the minister of defence.

==== Against the Soviets ====
The 2nd Infantry Regiment was left in command of Vincas Grigaliūnas-Glovackis. He was well liked by soldiers but showed political ambitions. In particular, he conspired with Jurgis Aukštuolaitis to take control of Samogitia. As a result, Grigaliūnas-Glovackis was arrested and Liatukas assigned commander of the 2nd Infantry Regiment on 4 March 1919. However, unit's soldiers rebelled against such government actions. On 4 May, the unit freed Grigaliūnas-Glovackis and detained Liatukas.

The same day, Minister of Defence Antanas Merkys reassigned Liatukas to the 3rd Infantry Regiment which was being formed in Raseiniai. Liatukas worked to organize the unit and later participated in the Lithuanian offensive against the Soviets as part of the Vilkmergė Group. In July 1919, Vilkmergė Group was reorganized into the 1st Brigade (1st and 3rd Infantry Regiments and three battalions) and Liatukas was appointed its commander on 17 July 1919.

However, Liatukas asked Kazys Ladiga to continue to command the men as Ladiga was more familiar with the unit and the operation. In particular, Ladiga commanded the operation to retake Zarasai on 23 August as Liatukas was on short vacation due to the deaths of his father and brother. By the end of August, Soviet forces were driven across the Daugava River and the Lithuanian–Soviet front stabilized. On 27 September 1919, Liatukas and the entire staff of the brigade were captured by Polish forces in Birkineļi (present-day Latvia). However, Polish forces opted to avoid further confrontation and quickly released the staff.

==== Against the Bermontians ====
In the aftermath of the attempted Polish coup in August 1919, commander of the Lithuanian Army Silvestras Žukauskas was forced to resign due to his perceived friendliness towards Poland. The government considered replacing him with general Vladas Dionizas Slaboševičius, but he died of an illness. On 7 October 1919, Žukauskas was replaced by Liatukas who at the same time was the director of the Ministry of Defence (effectively, Liatukas was both minister of defence and chief commander of the armed forces at the same time). On the same day, he was promoted to lieutenant general.

In this role, Liatukas organized defence against the Bermontians that attacked northern Lithuania. He negotiated with German commander Walter von Eberhardt regarding the withdrawal of German troops from Lithuania. The last units that recognized orders from the German government withdrew on 15 November 1919. In combating the remaining units, Liatukas had to balance military threat posed by the Soviet Union and Poland and diplomatic issues (French general and delegate Henri Niessel, representing the Entente powers, demanded a peaceful solution the crisis). Nevertheless, Liatukas gathered Lithuanian forces and put Ladiga in charge of the offensive. After the decisive Battle of Radviliškis on 21–22 November 1919, German units retreated from Lithuania by mid-December 1919.

==== Panemunė mutiny ====
In December 1919, Liatukas signed order delegating Vladas Nagevičius to organize and establish the Vytautas the Great War Museum. The museum started operations in 1921.

In February 1920, soldiers stationed in Kaunas became restless due to poor conditions and provisions. The discontent was further instigated by the communists. On 22 February, soldiers marched towards the Church of St. Michael the Archangel and presented their demands to Liatukas who agreed to consider them. Appeased, most soldiers returned to their barracks, but soldiers in Panemunė continued to rebel.

Liatukas went to the barracks hoping to find a peaceful resolution, but was detained. Antanas Merkys, Kazys Ladiga, and Stasys Nastopka organized loyal military units (primarily the 6th and 8th Infantry Regiments) to put down the rebellion. Freed from the rebels, Liatukas submitted his resignation as commander of the army on 23 February 1920. He was replaced by Silvestras Žukauskas as the commander of the Lithuanian Army.

On 23 February 1920, Liatukas was assigned as commander of the newly formed Local Army Brigade (Vietinės kariuomenės brigada). The brigade encompassed all kommandaturas (military headquarters) in districts and cities that were responsible for public order. Liatukas took command of the brigade and issued the first order on 27 April 1920. On 15 July 1920, Liatukas was appointed officer of special affairs under the army commander, but resigned from the military three weeks later. He disliked and did not agree with Konstantinas Žukas, who became the chief army commander on 7 July 1920.

=== Civilian life ===
Liatukas resigned from the military on 5 August 1920. The following day, he became assistant treasurer of Lithuania. He was the acting treasurer from 15 July 1921 to 12 March 1922. In October 1922, Liatukas transferred to the Bank of Lithuania and worked to ensure the proper storage of the newly printed Lithuanian litas. At the bank, he met his wife Vanda Baranauskaitė (1903–1946) and they married in June 1923. They had two children, a son and a daughter.

From November 1924 to spring 1926, Liatukas was the director of the Šakiai county. He then retired and worked at his farms in his native Padievaitis and in Kurniškės near Žasliai. Around 1933, he returned to Kaunas. The family lived on Liatukas' state pension.

=== NKVD prison ===
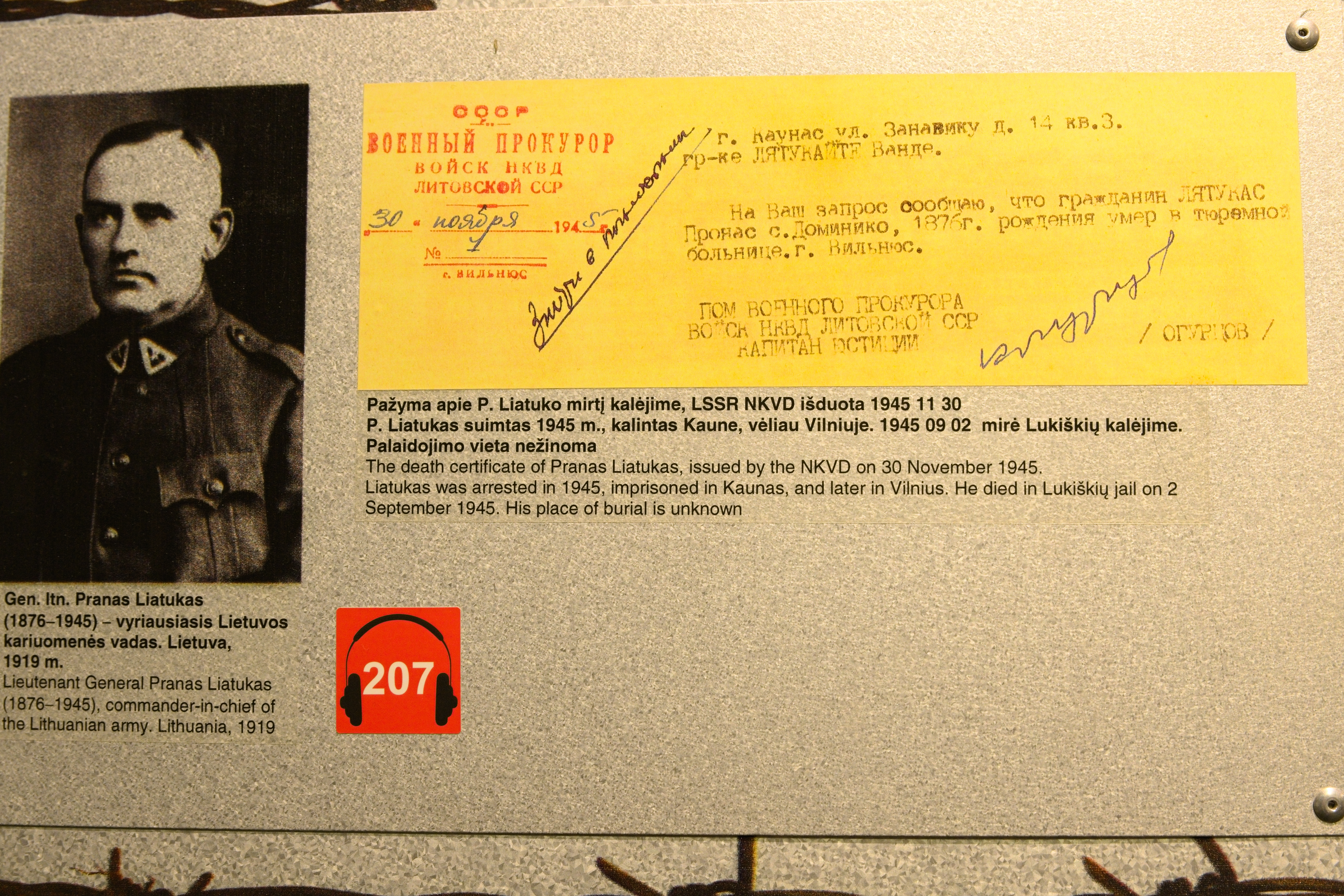
Death certificate of Liatukas issued by the NKVD on 30 November 1945

On 28 October 1940, Soviet NKVD searched Liatukas apartment and arrested his sixteen year-old son Vytautas. He was accused of participating in anti-Soviet student organization, but was released in February 1941 due to lack of evidence. In 1944, Liatukas and his son Vytautas volunteered for the Lithuanian Territorial Defense Force. Vytautas was accepted while Liatukas was refused due his old age.

In 1944, many Lithuanians retreated west escaping the advancing Red Army, but Liatukas and his family remained in Lithuania. On 30 January 1945, he and his son Vytautas were arrested by the NKVD. One of the arresting officers was Nachman Dushanski. They were accused of participating in the Lithuanian Liberty Army (LLA), an anti-Soviet resistance group. NKVD agents found blank forms to register new LLA recruits at Liatukas apartment. Liatukas denied any knowledge of the group or the forms.

In July 1945, he was transferred to the Lukiškės Prison in Vilnius. He died there on 2 September 1945. The official cause of death was registered as stomach cancer and heart disease due to old age. According to memoirs of fellow inmates, Liatukas was tortured because he refused to testify and remained stubbornly silent during interrogations. NKVD documents show that Liatukas could not be questioned as early as two days after his arrest "due to illness". His burial place is unknown. His son Vytautas was imprisoned in Sevzheldorlag but was released due to lack of evidence in 1947.

== Memorials ==
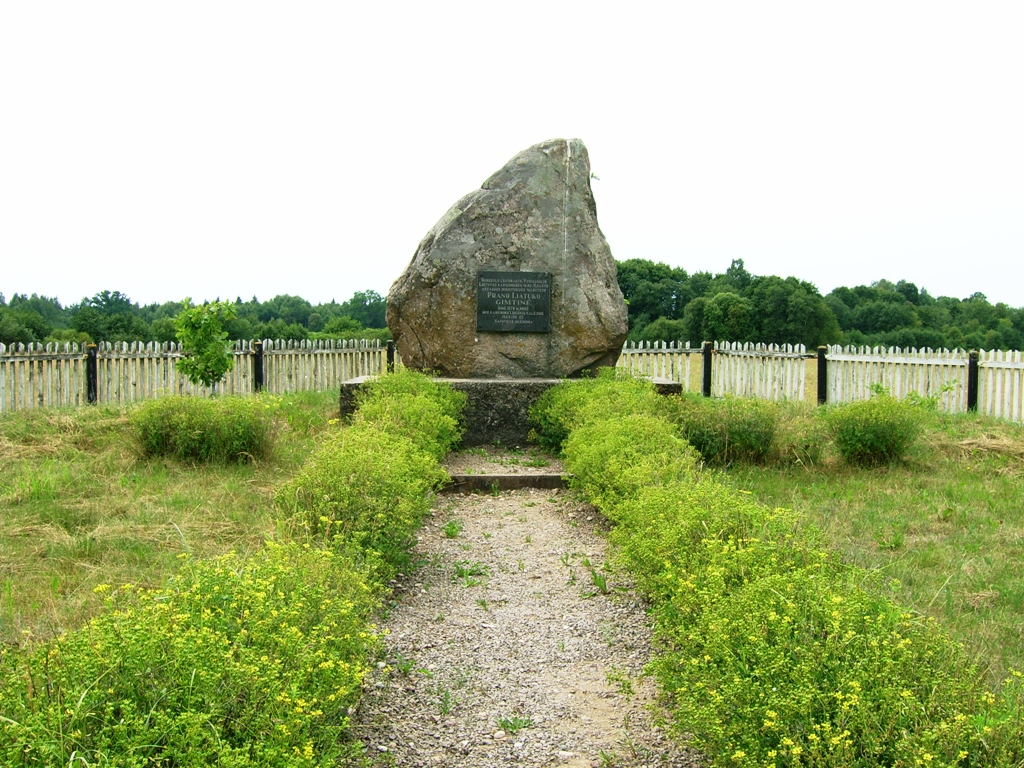
Memorial dedicated to Liatukas in Padievaitis

In 1995, his 50th death anniversary, a memorial stone was unveiled at Liatukas birthplace in Padievaitis. In May 2024, a memorial plaque was affixed to the outside wall of Lukiškės Prison.

== Awards ==
Liatukas received the following awards:

- Order of Saint Anna (3rd and 4th degrees, 1914)
- Order of Saint Stanilaus (3rd degree in 1914, 2nd degree in 1916)
- Order of the Cross of Vytis (5th degree, 1919)

== Bibliography ==
- Bitautas, Algis (2016). "Pranas Liatukas" (PDF). In Tamošaitis, Mindaugas; Bitautas, Algis; Svarauskas, Artūras (eds.). Lietuvos Respublikos 1918–1940 m. vyriausybių ministrų biografinis žodynas (in Lithuanian). Vilnius: Mokslo ir enciklopedijų leidybos centras. pp. 250–254. ISBN 978-5-420-01778-4.
- Kulnytė, Birutė, ed. (2005). Lietuvos kariuomenės karininkai 1918–1953 (in Lithuanian). Vol. V. Vilnius: Lietuvos nacionalinis muziejus. ISBN 9955-415-51-7.
- Liatukaitė-Černienė, Vanda Eleonora (2004). "Lietuvos kario ir jo šeimos istorija. Generolas leitenantas Pranas Liatukas". In Misius, Kazys (ed.). Kvėdarna (PDF). Lietuvos valsčiai (in Lithuanian). Vilnius: Versmė. ISBN 978-9955-589-97-6.
- Kaminskas, Raimundas (16 May 2024). "Pagerbtas Lietuvos generolas Pranas Liatukas (1876-1945)" (in Lithuanian). Voruta.
- Lesčius, Vytautas (2004). Lietuvos kariuomenė nepriklausomybės kovose 1918–1920 (PDF). Lietuvos kariuomenės istorija (in Lithuanian). Vilnius: General Jonas Žemaitis Military Academy of Lithuania. ISBN 9955-423-23-4.
- Likhotvorik, Alexey (21 July 2012). Лятук Франц Доминикович. Русская армия в Первой мировой войне (in Russian).
- Surgailis, Gintautas (1992). Lietuvos kariuomenės vadai (in Lithuanian). Vilnius: Mintis. ISBN 5-417-00513-4.
- Surgailis, Gintautas (2013). Trečiasis pėstininkų Didžiojo Lietuvos kunigaikščio Vytauto pulkas (PDF) (in Lithuanian). Vilnius: Generolo Jono Žemaičio Lietuvos karo akademija. ISBN 9786098074130.
- Vasiliauskas, Antanas (1937). "Žemaičių batalionas". Karo archyvas (in Lithuanian). 8: 211–244.
