= Jonas Vytautas Žukas =

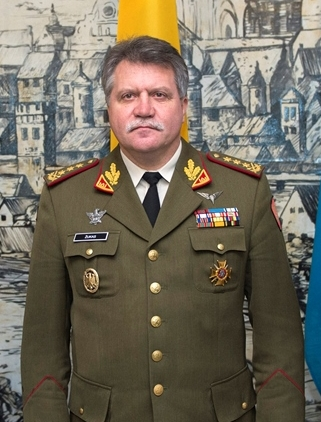
Žukas in 2015.

Jonas Vytautas Žukas (born 1 June 1962 in Kaunas) is a retired Lithuanian lieutenant general. From 2014 to 2019, he was the Chief of Defence.

== Early life ==
Žukas was born in Kaunas, the second largest city in the then Lithuanian SSR. From 1985 to 1991 he studied at the Faculty of History at Vilnius University.

== Military career ==
In the year he graduated, Žukas was appointed a major in the Department of National Defence, the predecessor of today's Ministry of Defence. After transferring to the rebuilding armed forces, he attended the Bundeswehr Command and Staff College in Hamburg from 1992 to 1994. Subsequently, with the rank of lieutenant colonel, he served as chief of staff of the Infantry Brigade Iron Wolf. A year later, in 1995, he was appointed its commander and promoted to colonel in 1997. From 2001, he served as military attaché in Berlin, where he was responsible for Germany, Austria, the Netherlands, and Luxembourg. From 2004, he commanded the Training and Doctrine Command.

In 2006 and 2007, he attended the NATO Defense College in Rome, after which he was promoted to Brigadier General on 23 November 2007. In this rank, Žukas was appointed Commander of the Lithuanian Land Forces on 23 April 2008 (which he had been leading on an interim basis since 2007). In 2010, he was promoted to Major General. From 6 August 2012, the general served as the representative of the Lithuanian Armed Forces to NATO and the European Union. In 2014, he was appointed by President Dalia Grybauskaitė as the new Chief of Defence (confirmed by Seimas on 26 June and formally sworn into office on 24 July). Just under a year later, on 22 June 2015, he was promoted to Lieutenant General. After the end of his five-year term of service, he was replaced as army chief by Valdemaras Rupšys in July 2019.

After leaving the army, Žukas initially became chief advisor on national security issues to President Gitanas Nausėda, but withdrew to private life after only a few months.

== Private life ==
He is married and the father of a son. Besides Lithuanian, he speaks English, German, and Russian.

== Awards ==
| Knight of the Order of the Vytis Cross (1998) |
| Officer of the Order of Merit of the Republic of Poland (2000) |
| Grand Cross of the Order of the North Star (2015) |
| Grand Cross of the Order of Viesturs (2016) |
| Grand Officer of the Order of the Vytis Cross (2018) |
| Commander Legion of Merit (2018) |
