= Commander of the Lithuanian Land Forces =

The Commander of the Lithuanian Land Forces (Lithuanian: Lietuvos sausumos pajėgos vadas) is the service chief of the Lithuanian Land Forces. They are the principal military advisor to the Chief of Defence of the Republic of Lithuania on matters pertaining to the Land Forces. The commander is typically the highest-ranking officer in the Land Forces and are at the head of Land Forces Command Headquarters.

== List of commanders ==
- Major General Valdas Tutkus (2001 – 2004)
- Brigadier General Arvydas Pocius (2004 – 2007)
- Brigadier General Jonas Vytautas Žukas (23 April 2008 – 6 August 2012)
- Major General Almantas Leika (6 August 2012 – 2016)
- General Valdemaras Rupšys (2016 – 2019)
- General Raimundas Vaikšnoras (24 July 2019 – 21 July 2022)
- Brigadier General Artūras Radvilas (21 July 2022 – 2025)
- Brigadier General Nerijus Stankevičius (4 August 2025 – Present)
