= Jonas Kronkaitis =

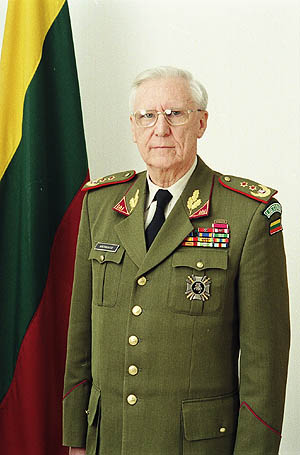
- Official portrait
- Born: Jonas Algirdas Kronkaitis; 1 February 1935 (age 91); Širvintos, Lithuania
- Allegiance: United States; Lithuania
- Branch: United States Army; Lithuanian Land Force
- Service years: 1959–1985; 1997–2004
- Rank: Major general

2nd Chief of Defence
- In office 1 July 1999 – 30 June 2004
- Preceded by: Jonas Andriškevičius
- Succeeded by: Valdas Tutkus

Major general Jonas Algirdas Kronkaitis (born 1 February 1935 in Širvintos) is a former Lithuanian military figure and ex-American military officer who served as the second Chief of Defence of Lithuania in the early 2000s.

== Early life and career in America ==
He was born in 1935 in Širvintos. In 1944, after the Soviet invasion of the Baltics, he left Lithuania with his parents, and in 1949 he moved to the United States, where he spent the rest of his youth. In 1959, he graduated from the University of Connecticut, that same year graduating from the Infantry Commanders and Ranger Course of the United States Army. From 1960–63 he served in military units of United States Army Europe in Germany, and from 1965–66 headed a Arms Division of the Army Headquarters in Vietnam. From 1970–71, he headed the Combat Support Base in Vietnam.

He graduated from Syracuse University in 1969 with a degree in Management and Business Administration. In 1968, he graduated from the United States Army Command and General Staff College, in 1978 from the United States Army War College, and in 1981 from the Defense Systems Management College. After graduating, he served as the commander of the Rock Island Arsenal and was heavily involved in the development of controlled projectile and artillery weapon systems until 1985 when he moved to the United States Army Reserve. During this period, he also participated in activities of the Lithuanian diaspora in the USA.

== Lithuanian service ==
In 1997, he came to Lithuania, that same year becoming the Deputy Minister of National Defense, serving in this position until 1999. That year, he became the Chief of Defence under President Valdas Adamkus. During this period, he led the preparation of the Lithuanian Armed Forces for NATO membership. He was dismissed in 2004.

== Post-military ==
In 2006, together with others, he founded the public organization Citizens' Gathering, being the chairman of its council.

In August 2006, politician Vytautas Pociūnas died under controversial circumstances, when he fell through the window of the hotel "Inturist" in Brest. A year later, Prime Minister Gediminas Kirkilas formed special work group to investigate the death circumstances repeatedly, which included Kronkaitis among others. In 2007, Kronkaitis resigned because of the inactivity of special commission. In May 2007, the Union of Citizens penned an open letter on the matter, of which the signatories was Kronkaitis.

== Awards ==
- Officer's Cross of the Order of Vytautas the Great (2003)
