= Vladas Dionizas Slaboševičius =

Lithuanian general

Major general Vladas Dionizas Slaboševičius
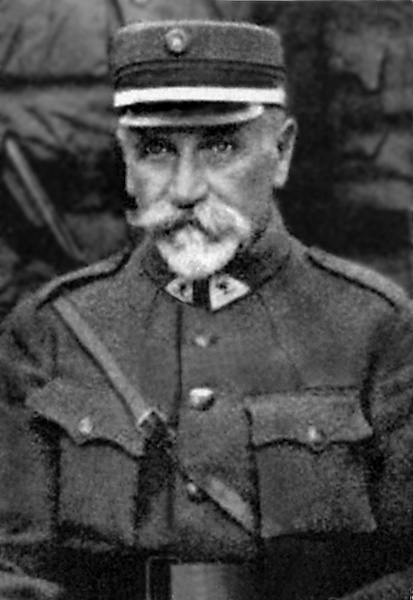
- Slaboševičius in uniform of the Lithuanian Army
- Born: 30 December 1860; Žynaŭcy, Russian Empire
- Died: 28 September 1919 (aged 58); Kaunas, Lithuania
- Alma mater: Paul's Military School
- Military career
- Allegiance: Russian Empire (1879–1918); Lithuania (1919)
- Rank: Major general
- Commands: 1st Pontoon Battalion
- Conflicts: Russo-Japanese War; World War I Lithuanian–Soviet War

Vladas Dionizas Slaboševičius (Russian: Владислав-Дионисий Целестинович Слабошевич; Polish: Władysław Słaboszewicz; 30 December 1861 – 28 September 1919) was a Lithuanian general who served in the Imperial Russian Army and briefly in the Lithuanian Army.

After graduating from the Paul's Military School in 1881, he was assigned to various engineer units of the Russian Imperial Army. He served in the Russo-Japanese War and distinguished himself during the Battle of Liaoyang. From January 1912 until the end of his career with the Russian army in early 1918 (the Imperial Russian Army essentially disbanded and disintegrated between late 1917 and early 1918 following the Bolshevik Revolution), he commanded the 1st Pontoon Battalion. He was promoted to general-mayor in December 1916. He was mobilized into the Lithuanian Army in July 1919 and was appointed chief commander of army as the replacement to Silvestras Žukauskas but died two days later of an illness.

== Biography ==
=== Family and origins ===
Slaboševičius was born on 30 December 1861 in Žynaŭcy near Lida in present-day Belarus. He was from a family of petty nobles. His family owned a manor in Butkaičiai near Kaltinėnai in Samogitia (some sources incorrectly identify Butkaičiai near Raseiniai).

His father was Celestyn Słaboszewicz, and his mother was Natalia née Bortkiewicz. He had four younger brothers and a sister. His youngest brother, Antoni Józef Kirn-Słaboszewicz, was a distinguished Polish engineer during the interwar period and the owner of the Paneriai estate near Vilnius and the Nowa Wieś estate near Wołomin.

=== Russian Imperial Army ===
In 1879, he graduated from the 2nd Military Gymnasium in Saint Petersburg and enrolled at the Paul's Military School. He graduated in 1881, was promoted to praporshchik, and assigned to the 3rd Engineer ("Sapper") Battalion. He served in various administrative and support functions – including instructor, head of bakery, treasurer, adjutant – in various engineer units. He served in the 15th Military Telegraph Park in 1885–1888, the 13th Joint Engineer Battalion in 1888–1894, and the 17th Engineer Battalion since 1894. In 1896, he was temporarily assigned to the coronation duty of Nicholas II of Russia.

He was promoted to shtabs-kapitan in 1893, to kapitan in 1897, and to podpolkovnik in 1904. During the Russo-Japanese War, he served with various units and distinguished himself during the Battle of Liaoyang. After the war, he was assigned to the 16th Engineer Battalion as assistant commander. In 1908–1909, he was the acting commander of the 3rd and 4th Engineer Battalions. In 1911, he was promoted to polkovnik and became the commander of the 4th Engineer Battalion.

From January 1912 until the end of his career with the Russian army, he commanded the 1st Pontoon Battalion. With this unit, he participated in World War I in the Northwestern Front. He was frequently assigned to battalion's military court, participated in military exercises and maneuvers, instructed others on military engineering. On 30 December 1916, he was promoted to general-mayor.

=== Lithuanian Army ===
Slaboševičius left the Russian Army in February 1918 as the army disbanded and disintegrated. He returned to Lithuania and was mobilized into the Lithuanian Army on 1 July 1919 during the Lithuanian–Soviet War. He was appointed head of the engineering unit attached to the General Staff but not granted the rank of general. On 26 September 1919, Silvestras Žukauskas was forced to resign as the chief commander of army due to the Polish plans of involving him in the attempted coup against the Lithuanian government. Slaboševičius was appointed as his successor, but became seriously ill with a heart condition and died two days later on 28 September. He was given an official funeral and was buried in Kaltinėnai.

He was survived by his wife, Maria Karolina d'O'Byrne, and their son, Bronisław.

== Awards ==
Slaboševičius received the following Russian orders:

- Order of Saint Vladimir (3rd degree in 1914, 4th degree in 1906 and 1915)
- Order of Saint Anna (2 degree in 1907, 3rd degree in 1896)
- Order of Saint Stanislaus (2nd degree 1902, 3rd degree in 1889)
- Silver Medal of the Coronation of Nicholas II and Alexandra Feodorovna (1896)
- Medal of the Romanov Tercentenary (1913)
