= Infantry Brigade Iron Wolf =

Infantry Brigade "Iron Wolf"
- Pėstininkų brigada "Geležinis Vilkas"
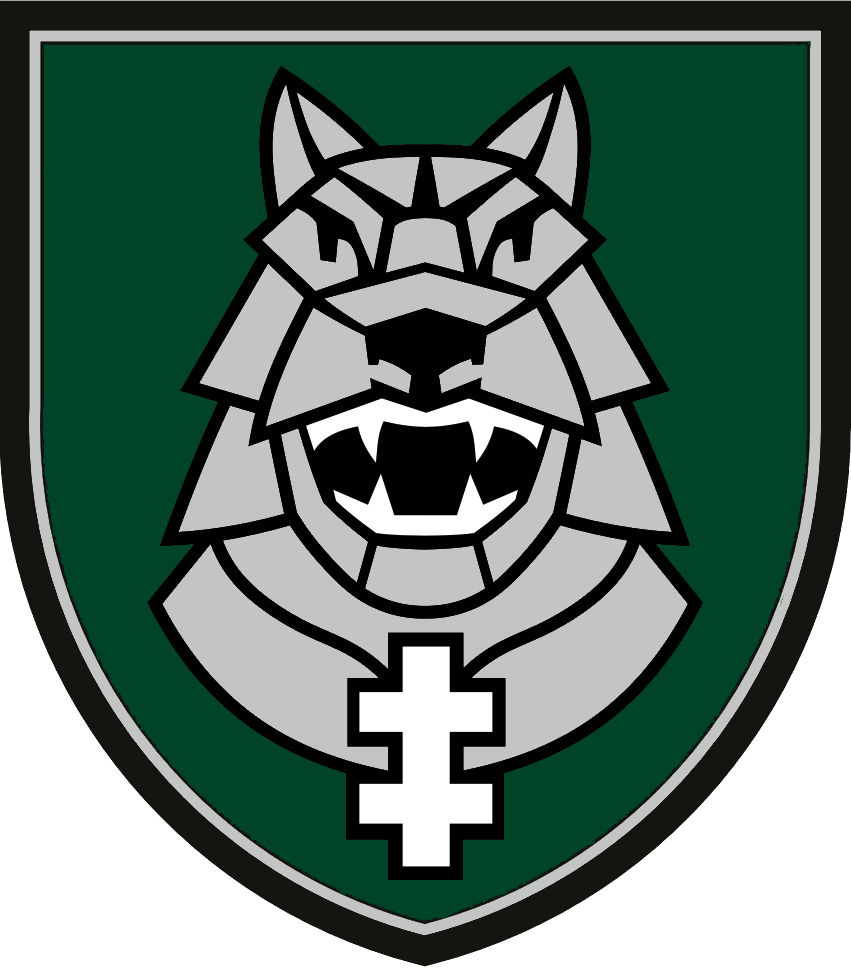
- Insignia of the Infantry Brigade "Iron Wolf"
- Active: 1992 – present
- Country: Lithuania
- Branch: Lithuanian Land Forces
- Type: Brigade
- Role: Mechanized infantry
- Size: 7 battalions
- Part of: 1st Division (Lithuania)
- Garrison/HQ: Rukla (Jonava district)
- March: Geležinio Vilko maršas
- Anniversaries: 6 June 1992
- Equipment: Lithuanian army equipment
- Website: Official site

Commanders
- Current commander: Colonel Darius Meilūnas
- Chief of Staff: Lieutenant Colonel Aurelijus Vrubliauskas
- Chief Warrant Officer: Command Sergeant Major Ruslanas Gulevas

Insignia
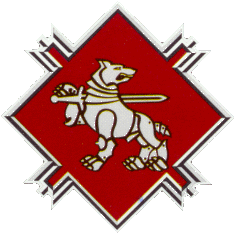
- Symbol of "Iron Wolf" Brigade Staff

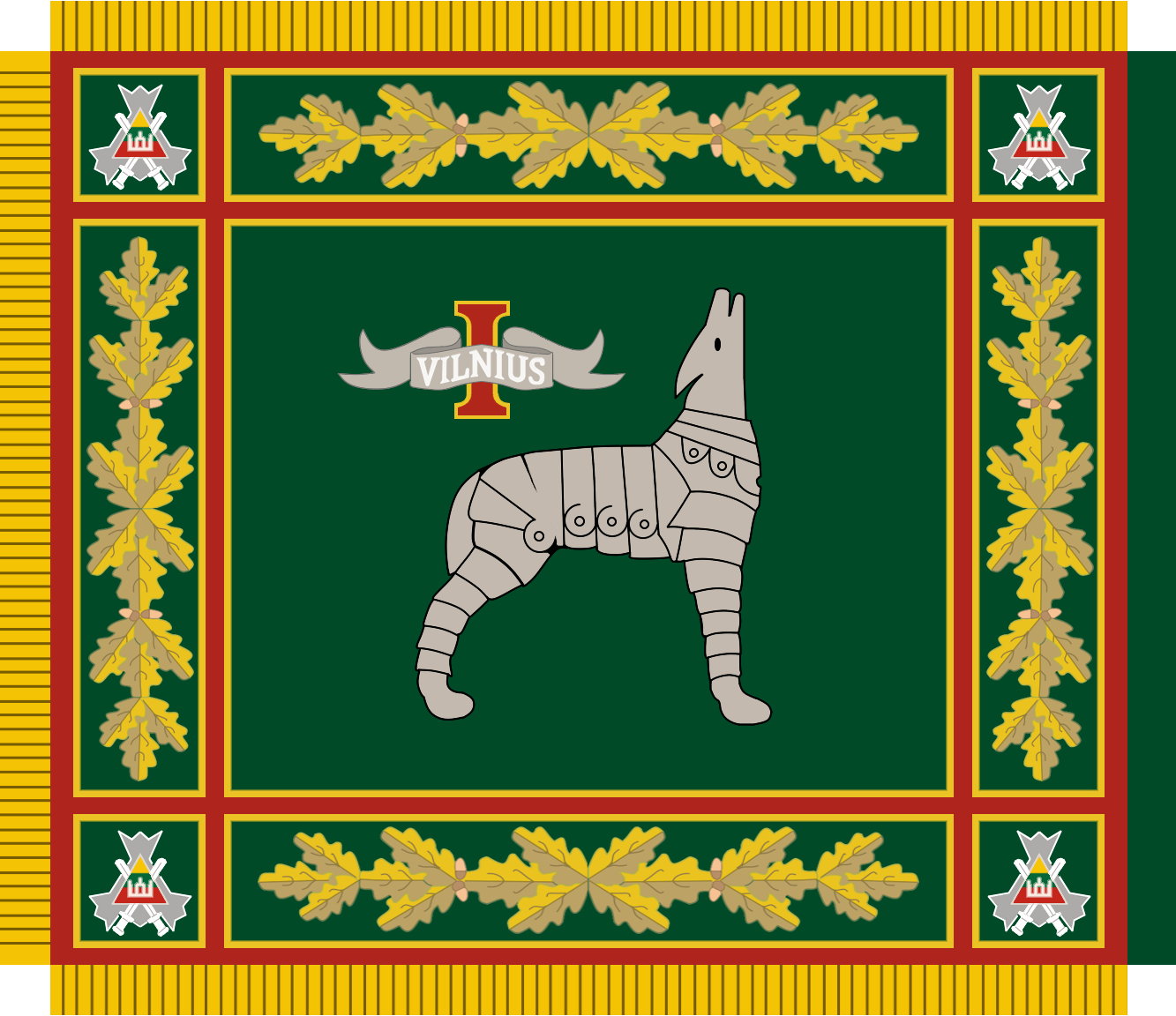
- Flag of "Iron Wolf" Brigade

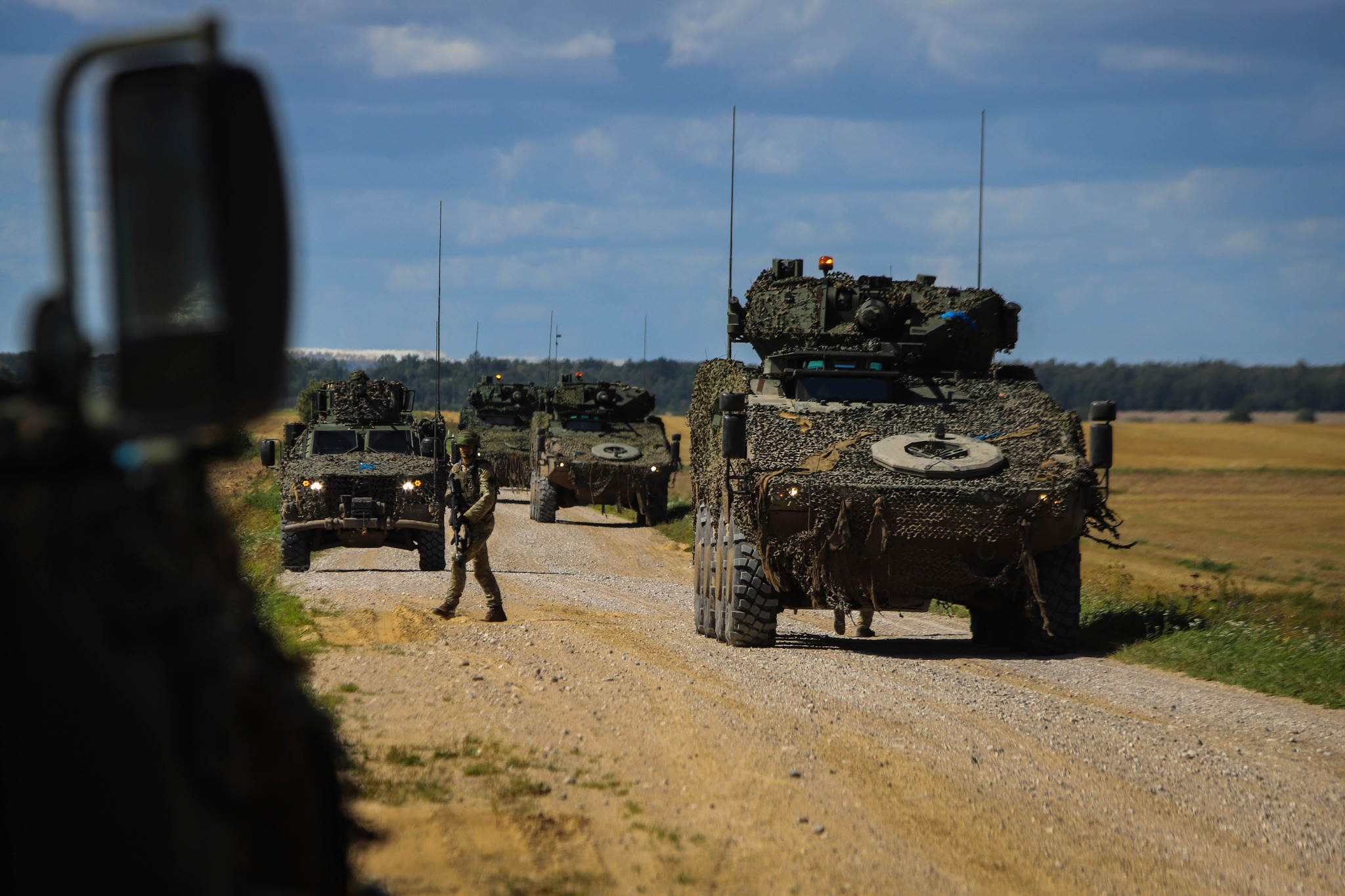
"Iron Wolf" Brigade military exercises

Infantry Brigade "Iron Wolf" ("Iron Wolf" Brigade) (Lithuanian: Pėstininkų brigada "Geležinis Vilkas") is the core unit of the Lithuanian Army and forms the country's contribution to NATO collective defence. The name of the brigade relates to the Lithuanian mythical character from the medieval foundation legend of the Vilnius city.

== Function ==
MIB "Iron Wolf" main mission is to maintain required capabilities as stated in national defense guide in order to defend Republic of Lithuania sovereignty, its territorial integrity, participate in NATO and international peace support operations, plan and conduct brigade staff and units training, main effort preparation for peace support operations in accordance with international commitments.

Main tasks:

- Plan and conduct the tasks related to military operations;
- Prepare training and activity plans of "Iron Wolf" brigade;
- Organize, conduct, evaluate and analyze training of subunits in order to achieve specify tasks and essential tasks of the mission;
- Control readiness of subunits of IB "Iron Wolf" to conduct stated missions and essential tasks of the mission;
- Coordinate main spheres of activity with the commander of "Iron Wolf" brigade;
- Take part in national and international military operations, exercises and projects of the military cooperation;
- Collect information on experience gathered during exercises and make suggestions to Brigade commander;
- Provide information and reports to the higher headquarters concerning implementation of training and activity plans;
- Provide assistance to state and municipal institutions by responding to threats of a non-military nature;
- Maintain close relationship with local society and participate in their activities.

== Structure ==
MIB "Iron Wolf" is the largest unit of land forces of the Lithuania Armed Forces, consists of the command, its elements and six battalions stationed across Lithuania and named after Lithuanian Great Dukes and Duchesses as the tradition of the Lithuanian Armed Forces goes:

- Iron Wolf Infantry Brigade, in Rukla
  - Headquarters and Headquarters Company, in Rukla
  - Tank Battalion, in Rukla (Initial Command Element)
  - King Mindaugas Hussar Battalion (Lithuanian: Karaliaus Mindaugo husarų batalionas), in Panevėžys
  - Grand Duchess Birutė Uhlan Battalion (Lithuanian: Didžiosios kunigaikštienės Birutės ulonų batalionas), in Alytus
  - Grand Duke Algirdas Infantry Battalion (Lithuanian: Lietuvos didžiojo kunigaikščio Algirdo pėstininkų batalionas), in Rukla
  - Duke Vaidotas Infantry Battalion (Lithuanian: Kunigaikščio Vaidoto pėstininkų batalionas), in Rukla
  - General Romualdas Giedraitis Artillery Battalion (Lithuanian: Generolo Romualdo Giedraičio artilerijos batalionas), in Rukla
  - Lieutenant general Jokūbas Jasinskis Logistics battalion (Lithuanian: Generolo leitenanto Jokūbo Jasinskio logistikos batalionas), in Rukla
  - Reconnaissance Company, in Rukla
  - Signal Company, in Rukla

== History ==
The unit originated in June 1990, when a separate Defence Squad was created. Same year, in autumn, the Honors Guards Company was created.

- January 13, 1991 – both the Defence Squad and the Honors Guard Company defend the Lithuania's parliament building, the Hall of Press, the Ministers' Council building, the Vilnius TV Tower, and other buildings during the January Events;
- February 22, 1991 – a Training Regiment (Lithuanian: Mokomasis junginys) is created;
- November 14, 1991 – the Training Regiment reorganized as Rapid Reaction Mechanized Infantry Brigade (Lithuanian: Greitojo reagavimo motodesantinė brigada). Brigade's subunits, stationed in various parts of Lithuania, are considered equal to battalions;
- Spring, 1992 – First draftees are assigned to the newly formed Brigade, with battalions stationed Vilnius, Kaunas, Klaipėda, Šiauliai, Tauragė, and two companies are stationed in Alytus and Marijampolė (the two latter later growing into full battalions);
- January 2, 1992 – Renamed as Field army 1st Mechanized Airborne Brigade (Lithuanian: Lauko kariuomenės 1-oji motodesantinė brigada);
- June 6, 1992 – Unit's first parade in the Cathedral Square, Vilnius; Brigade is awarded the name "Iron Wolf" (Lithuanian: "Geležinis Vilkas");
- April 1, 1995 – Klaipėda's battalion is reassigned under the Navy command; Kaunas's battalion reassigned under the Army HQ's command;
- January 26, 1996 – Field Infantry Brigade reorganized as "Iron Wolf" Mechanized Infantry Brigade (Lithuanian: Motorizuotoji pėstininkų brigada "Geležinis Vilkas");
- October 27, 1996 – Brigade's battalions in Šiauliai (the "Grand Duke Vaidotas" battalion) and Tauragė (the "Grand Duke Kęstutis" battalion) are reassigned as separate units;
- In 2004 – the bilateral project between Denmark and Lithuania LITBRIG has started;
- August 31, 2006 – in Haderslev, Denmark, the Chief of Defense of Lithuania Maj. Gen. Valdas Tutkus and Chief of Defense of Denmark Gen. Hans Jasper Helsø signed the Memorandum of MIB "Iron Wolf" affiliation with Danish Division.
- In March 2023, Gen. Valdemaras Rupšys, the chief of defence of Lithuanian Armed Forces has announced the plans to acquire up to 54 main battle tanks, and plans to transform the hussar battalion into a tank battalion, as part of an effort to create a Lithuanian division by 2030.

=== Commanders ===
- Col. Česlovas Jezerskas (February 22, 1991 – January 27, 1995)
- Col. Jonas Vytautas Žukas (January 27, 1995 – August 21, 2001)
- Col. Vitalijus Vaikšnoras (August 21, 2001 – October 1, 2003)
- Col. Gediminas Jurgutis (October 1, 2003 – May 19, 2005)
- Col. Darius Užkuraitis (May 19, 2005 – June 27, 2008)
- Col. Vilmantas Tamošaitis (June 27, 2008 – June 29, 2011)
- Col. Valdemaras Rupšys (June 29, 2011 – July 4, 2013)
- Col. Raimundas Vaikšnoras (July 4, 2013 – January 8, 2016)
- Col. Mindaugas Steponavičius (January 8, 2016 – November 27, 2019)
- Col. Mindaugas Petkevičius (November 27, 2019 – August 3, 2022)
- Col. Aurelijus Motiejūnas (August 3, 2022 – June 6, 2025)
- Col. Darius Meilūnas (June 6, 2025 - present)

== International cooperation ==
The soldiers of the brigade participate in exercises of various levels in Lithuania as well as abroad. In addition, they are conducting peacekeeping operations in Afghanistan and stand by period in NATO Response Force and Battlegroup of the European Union. The Brigade constantly takes part in joint projects, international operations, and wargames together with other countries' military units. Among those are the British Armed Forces, the Army of Denmark, the Army of the Czech Republic, the United States Military, Poland and Germany.

=== International joint projects ===
- ARTBALT, a joint project with Denmark to create an artillery battalion in Lithuania
- BALTBAT, a multinational project aimed to create and train a joint infantry battalion between Lithuania's, Latvia's, and Estonia's militaries. The project is executed in cooperation with several Scandinavian nations, Great Britain, and the United States.
- LITPOLBAT, a project to create a joint battalion with Poland's military.
- LITBAT, a project aimed to reorganized the Grand Duke Algirdas Battalion into a mechanized infantry battalion, capable of operating together with NATO forces. Executed with the help of Denmark's military instructors.
- Grunwald Wind, a biannual military practice in Poland. The Brigade's HQ and the Duchess Birtutė Battalion take part in those.
- The biannual Amber Hope military practice, together with other BALTBAT members.
- The NATO military practice Strong Resolve 2001 and Strong Resolve 2002 in Poland.
- The Cooperative Lantern 2002 military practice in the Netherlands, attended by soldiers from the Brigade HQ and the King Mindaugas Battalion.

=== International peacekeeping missions ===
- UNPROFOR (Croatia);
- IFOR (Bosnia and Herzegovina);
- SFOR (Bosnia and Herzegovina);
- KFOR (Kosovo).
- OIF (Iraq)
