= Stasys Knezys =

3rd Chief of the Defence Staff of Lithuania

- Born: 20 November 1948; Zarasai District Municipality, Lithuania
- Died: 25 August 2011 (aged 62); Vilnius, Lithuania
- Burial place: Antakalnis Cemetery
- Alma mater: Tver Anti-Aircraft Defense Commanders Military Academy
- Military career
- Allegiance: Lithuania; USSR
- Service: Soviet Army; Lithuanian Land Force
- Service years: 1966–2011
- Rank: Colonel
- Awards: Order of the Cross of Vytis
- Other work: Book author

3rd Chief of the Defence Staff of Lithuania
- In office 1 February 1993 – 3 January 1994
- President: Algirdas Brazauskas
- Preceded by: Valdas Tutkus
- Succeeded by: Valdas Tutkus

Colonel Stasys Knezys (Lithuanian: [/ˈstɑːsɪs ˈknɛzɪs/]; 20 November 1948–25 August 2011) was a Lithuanian military colonel, a historian of warfare, and a doctor of technical sciences. He began his military career in the Soviet Army in 1966, serving until its dissolution in 1991. Knezys also authored several notable works on military history.

== Education ==
He began his studies at the Vilnius Military School in 1966, where he received foundational training in military sciences. After Lithuania regained its independence in 1990, Knezys continued his academic pursuits, earning a doctorate in technical sciences. His scholarly work focused on military history and technical aspects of warfare, reflecting his commitment to both practical and theoretical aspects of military studies.

== Career ==
From 1966 to 1991, Stasys Knezys served in the Soviet Army. From 1969 to 1977, he was the chief technician and later the commander of an anti-aircraft missile division. From 1980 to 1985, he served as the chief of staff for a regiment stationed in Ulan-Ude (Buryatia).

In 1992, he became the head of the Operational Department of the Joint Staff of the Ministry of Defence of the Republic of Lithuania, holding the rank of colonel. Between 1992 and 1993, he was the Lithuanian government's representative responsible for overseeing the withdrawal of the Russian military from Lithuanian territory. From 1 February 1993 to 3 January 1994, he served as the Chief of the Lithuanian Armed Forces Staff. From 1994 to 1996, he was the General Inspector of the Armed Forces. In 1997, he became the Defence Advisor to the President of Lithuania and Secretary of the National Defence Council. From 2001 to 2002, he was the senior advisor to the National Security and Defence Committee of the Lithuanian Parliament. Since 2002, he has been the head of the National Security Department in the Government of the Republic of Lithuania.

Since 2001, Knezys has been the chairman of the Reserve Officers Union. He is also a member of the Lithuanian Independent Writers Union and a member of the editorial board and co-author of the encyclopedic publication "Lithuanian Army Officers 1918-1953" (2001–2011).

== Death ==
Stasys Knezys died on 25 August 2011, at the age of 62.

== Books ==
- The War in Chechnya. Co-authored with Romanas Sedlickas, this 1999 book offers a comprehensive military analysis of the Chechen conflict.
- Laisvės saulei tekant. Published in 1999, this work, co-authored with Jeronimas Naprys and Vytautas Indrašius, explores themes of freedom and independence.
- Lietuvos nepriklausomieji rašytojai. Edited by Vytautas Indrašius in 1998, this book includes contributions from Knezys, focusing on Lithuanian independent writers.
