= Juozas Stanaitis =

Lithuanian general

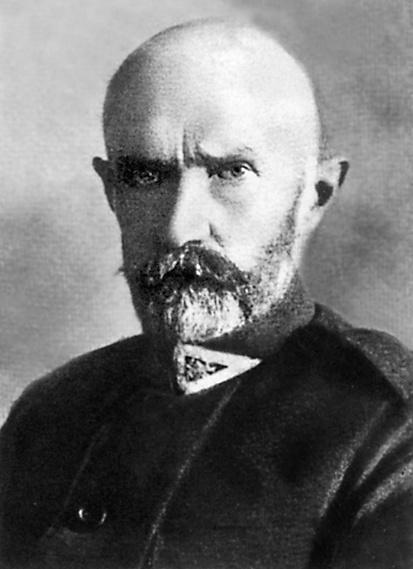
- Stanaitis in the Lithuanian Army
- Born: 13 August 1865; Matarnai, Congress Poland
- Died: 12 July 1925 (aged 59); Matarnai, Lithuania
- Alma mater: Kazan Military School; Officers' Rifle School
- Military career
- Allegiance: Russian Empire (1893–1917); Lithuania (1921–1923)
- Branch: Russian Imperial Army; Lithuanian Army
- Rank: Lieutenant general
- Commands: 3rd Infantry Division; Lithuanian Army
- Conflicts: World War I
- Awards: Order of the Cross of Vytis

Juozas Stanaitis (13 August 1865 – 12 July 1925) was a Lithuanian general who served in the Imperial Russian Army and later in the Lithuanian Army. He was the acting supreme commander of the Lithuanian Army from 11 February 1922 to 5 June 1923.

Stanaitis joined the Russian Imperial Army and served in the 12th Astrakhan Granadier Regiment for about 30 years. He graduated from the Kazan Military School and the Officers' Rifle School and rose to the rank of colonel. He fought in World War I and was injured six times. He left the Russian army after the October Revolution and returned to Lithuania in early 1921. He was mobilized in the Lithuanian Army. He was appointed commander of the 3rd Infantry Division in May 1921 and supreme commander of the army in February 1922. He was promoted to lieutenant general in August 1922. However, failing health forced him to resign and retire from the military in December 1923.

== Biography ==
=== Russian Empire ===
Stanaitis was born on 13 August 1865 in the village of Matarnai in Congress Poland (present-day Šakiai District Municipality in Lithuania). He studied at Marijampolė Gymnasium and passed entrance exams to the Polytechnic and Agricultural-Forestry Institute in Puławy (according to other sources, he studied at and graduated from the institute).

However, he chose to join the Russian Imperial Army in 1887. He was assigned to the 12th Astrakhan Granadier Regiment. To further his military career, he converted from Roman Catholicism to Eastern Orthodoxy. He graduated from the Kazan Military School in 1899 and from the Officers' Rifle School in Oranienbaum in 1909. At the 12th Astrakhan Granadier Regiment, he commanded a reconnaissance group for eight years, a company for eight and a half years, and a battalion for five years. He was promoted to lieutenant colonel in August 1912.

During World War I, Stanaitis fought against the Austrians in the Battle of Galicia and the Germans near Baranovichi. He was injured six times, including shell-shocked twice, injuries to both legs, and broken ribs. This had a lasting impact on his health for the rest of his life. He was awarded several Russian orders and reportedly nominated for the Order of Saint George. In 1917, he was promoted to colonel. After the October Revolution, he left the military and for some time lived in Moscow at the Lithuanian diplomatic office.

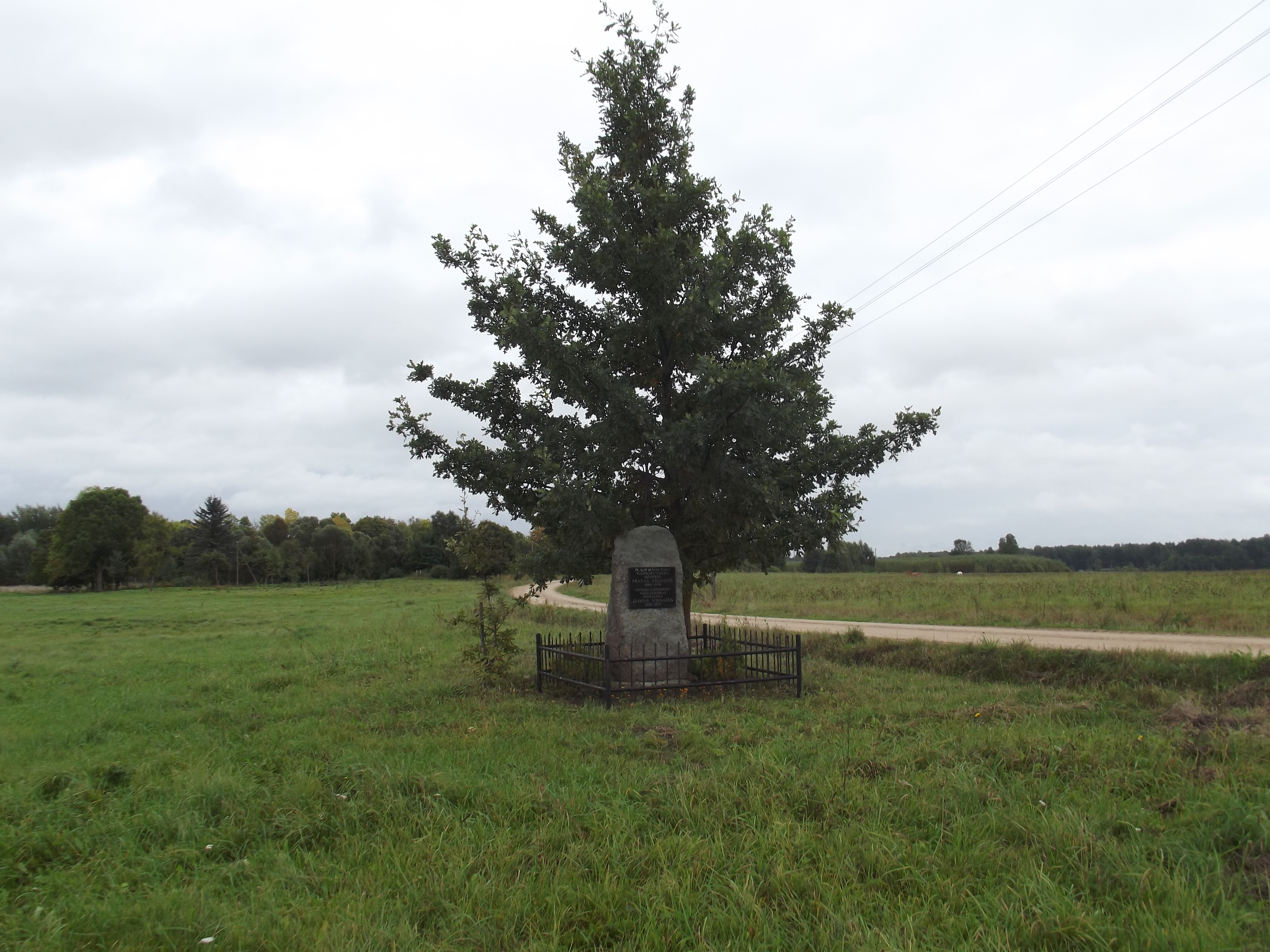
Monument to brothers Stanaitis in Matarnai

=== Independent Lithuania ===
Stanaitis returned to Lithuania in early 1921 and was mobilized to the Lithuanian Army on 1 April 1921, already after the end of the Lithuanian Wars of Independence. He was first assigned to the General Staff, but was reassigned as commander of the 3rd Infantry Division on 29 May 1921.

On 11 February 1922, he became the supreme commander of the Lithuanian Army. He was promoted to lieutenant general in August 1922. He tried to instill strict discipline and paid particular attention to soldiers' education. He emphasized the importance of knowing history, developing patriotic feelings, and religion. During his tenure, Lithuanian Army engaged in several skirmishes in the Polish–Lithuanian Neutral Strip. Due to deteriorating health, he was removed from the command of the army on 5 June 1923 and given a four-month leave for medical treatments. He was released to the reserves on 31 December 1923. He was granted a state pension in April 1924.

Stanaitis moved to his native village of Matarnai Where he died on 12 July 1925. He was buried in nearby cemetery of Slabadai. A monument to Stanaitis and his brother engineer Pranas Stanaitis was erected at their birthplace.

== Awards ==
Stanaitis received the following awards for his military service:

- Order of Saint Stanislaus (3rd class in 1902, 2nd class in 1913)
- Order of Saint Anna (3rd class in 1909, 2nd class with swords in 1915)
- Order of Saint Vladimir (4th class with swords and bow in 1915)
- Order of the Cross of Vytis (2nd type, 1st degree in 1923)
