= Land Forces Command Headquarters =

The Lithuanian Land Forces Command Headquarters (Lithuanian: Lietuvos kariuomenės Sausumos pajėgų vadovybės štabas) is the highest military unit of the Lithuanian Land Forces. Its job is to assist the Commander of the Lithuanian Land Forces in making decisions and implementing them by preparing Land Forces military units for the military protection and defense of the state's land territory, capable of participating in international operations, ensuring effective administration of Land Forces units, their combat training and combat readiness.

== Structure ==
The Land Forces Command Headquarters consists of:

- Land Forces Command
- Budget Department
- Security Department
- Chief of Staff
- 6 Deputy Chiefs of Staff (G1-G6)
- G9 Headquarters Departments
- Headquarters Supply Company and Communications Company.

== History ==
On 19 February 1999, the first posts of the Field Forces Headquarters were approved by order of the Minister of National Defence Česlovas Stankevičius. On 11 October 2001, the Field Forces Command (LFC) of the Lithuanian Armed Forces was registered with the Department of Statistics under the Government of Lithuania. On 19 November 2001, the Field Forces Command insignia was approved by order of the Minister of National Defence Linas Antanas Linkevičius. On 1 January 2002, the Field Forces Command was renamed the Field (Land) Forces Command. At the end of 2002 , the Field (Land) Forces Command moved from the Defence Headquarters building to larger premises at 36 Viršuliškių Street in Vilnius, where it is located to this day.

On 18 June 2004, the Field Force Commander was presented with the Field Force Command Battle Flag. On 23 September 2005, during a special exercise, the NATO Europe Land Component Headquarters positively assessed the Field Force Headquarters and recognized it as capable of planning and executing operations and operating smoothly with Allied forces. On 1 September 2008, the Field (Land) Forces Headquarters was renamed the Land Forces Headquarters. On 1 September 2008, the Land Forces Headquarters transferred the functions of planning, command and support of international operations to the Joint Staff of the Lithuanian Armed Forces (now the Defence Staff).
