= Arvydas Pocius =

Lithuanian lieutenant general (born 1957)

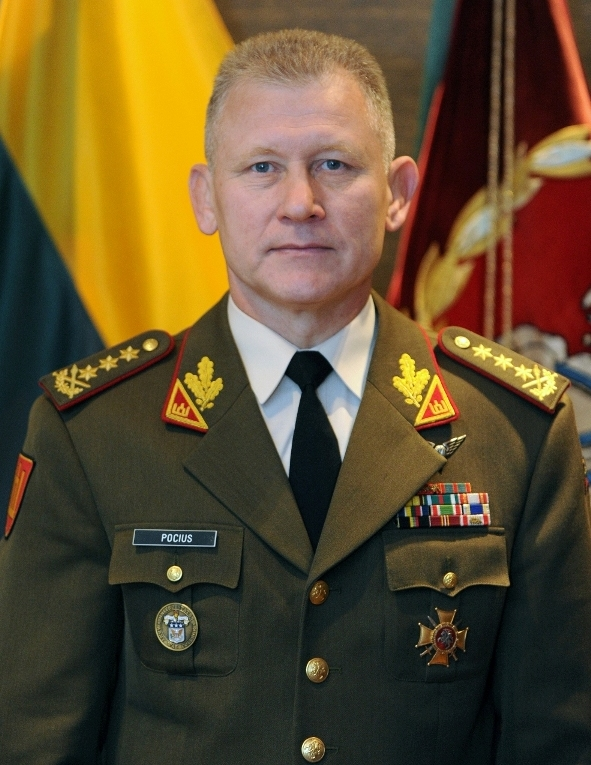
- Born: May 14, 1957 (age 69); Klaipėda, Lithuanian SSR, Soviet Union
- Military career
- Allegiance: USSR; Lithuania
- Branch: Soviet Army; Lithuanian Land Force
- Service years: 1979–2014
- Rank: Lieutenant general
- Commands: Chief of Defence of Lithuania; Commander of the Lithuanian Land Force; Commander of the Eastern Military District of the Lithuanian Armed Forces; Chief of Staff of Voluntary Service of National Defence
- Awards: Order of the Cross of Vytis; Medal of January 13; Medal of the Founders Volunteers of the Lithuanian Armed Forces; Commemorative Badge of Russian Army withdrawal from Lithuania; Medal of Merit of National Defence System

Member of the Seimas
- Incumbent
- Assumed office 14 November 2024
- Constituency: Baltijos

4th Chief of Defence of Lithuania
- In office 24 July 2009 – 24 July 2014
- President: Dalia Grybauskaitė
- Minister: Rasa Juknevičienė
- Preceded by: Valdas Tutkus
- Succeeded by: Jonas Vytautas Žukas

Director of the State Security Department of Lithuania
- In office 30 April 2004 – 12 June 2007
- Preceded by: Mečys Laurinkus
- Succeeded by: Povilas Malakauskas

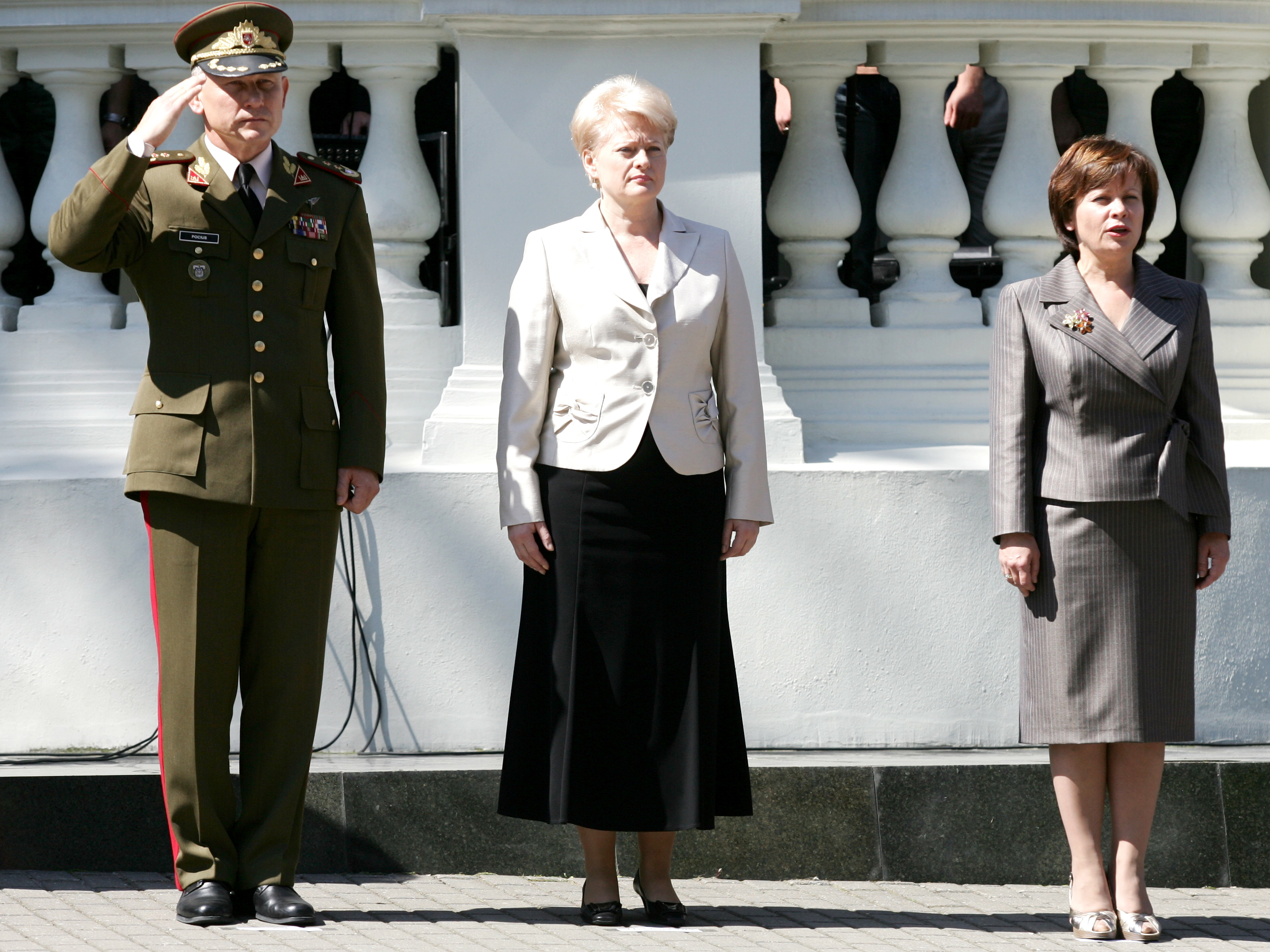
Arvydas Pocius, President of Lithuania Dalia Grybauskaitė and Minister of Defense Rasa Juknevičienė

Lieutenant General Arvydas Pocius (born 14 May 1957) is a former Chief of Defence of Lithuania. During his military career, Pocius has held various positions, including Chief of Staff of Voluntary Service of National Defence, and Commander of the Lithuanian Land Forces. Pocius was Lithuanian champion of freestyle wrestling in junior, youth and adult groups.

== Early years ==
Pocius was born on 14 May 1957 in the port city of Klaipėda. In 1971, as a schoolboy he entered a free-style wrestling section and later became Lithuanian champion in junior, youth and adult groups. In 1975, Pocius graduated from high school and started studies in Physical Education Academy. During the studies he actively participated in sports, especially in judo, Sambo and free-style wrestling. Pocius achieved the title of Honored Master of Sports of USSR in judo and free-style wrestling. In 1979, he graduated from the Academy and worked as a coach of free-style wrestling, later judo.

== Soviet career ==
In 1979 after graduation from the reserve officer course in Kaliningrad, he gained the Soviet Army Mechanized infantry platoon leader qualification and was commissioned to the rank of lieutenant.

In 1988 while working in Lithuanian Physical Culture and Sports Committee as chief coach of judo and Sambo, Pocius joined Sąjūdis as a security guard in so called Green Armlet Group. He guarded leaders of Sąjūdis and ensured order during Freedom Movement demonstrations. On 16 February 1990 during the protest demonstration at the Supreme Council he officially resigned his commission in the Soviet Armed Forces. For this reason, Soviet defense minister Dmitry Yazov ordered that he be down-graded to the rank of private.

== Career after independence ==
On 11 January 1991, Pocius swore an oath to the Republic of Lithuania in the restored Parliament. As a soldier-volunteer he defended Parliament of Lithuania the January Events and the August coup. In March 1991 he joined Voluntary Service of National Defence. On 30 December 1991, as Deputy Chief of Staff of Voluntary Service of National Defence, Pocius was promoted to the rank of Major. In 1993, Pocius was promoted to the rank of lieutenant colonel. In 1994, Pocius was assigned as a commander of Voluntary Service of National Defence.

Pocius joined Command and General Staff Course, Bundeswehr Command and Staff College in Hamburg, Germany in 1996. After graduation he was promoted to the rank of colonel and took over a position of Commander of National Defence Volunteer Service in 1998. Pocius was assigned to Command the Eastern Military District of the Lithuanian Armed Forces in 2002.

In 2003–2004 Pocius studied at US Army War College and completed the course of strategic studies. On 30 June 2004 Arvydas Pocius was promoted to the rank of brigadier general and was assigned as a commander of the Lithuanian Land Forces.

In June 2007, Pocius graduated from Vilnius University Institute of International Relations and Political Science and gained master's degree in political science. In autumn of the same year Pocius was assigned as Deputy Assistant Chief of Staff (DACOS) of the Joint Education and Training Sub-Division at the NATO HQ Allied Command Transformation.

On 24 July 2009, Pocius was assigned as Chief of Defence and was promoted to the rank of major general. On 28 July 2011. Pocius was promoted to the rank of lieutenant general.

== Post-military ==
In September 2014, President Dalia Grybauskaitė made him ambassador to Romania. Since 2019, he has been a member of Homeland Union, and since 2020, Chairman of the Homeland Union's Klaipėda branch.

== Awards ==
Pocius, during his 20 years of service in the Lithuanian Armed Forces, he was awarded the Order of the Cross of Vytis, the Medal of January 13, Medal of the Founders Volunteers of the Lithuanian Armed Forces, Commemorative Badge of Russian Army withdrawal from Lithuania, Medal of Merit of National Defence System.

Seimas
Preceded by Naglis Puteikis	Member of the Seimas for Danė electoral district 2020–present	Incumbent
