= Valdas Tutkus =

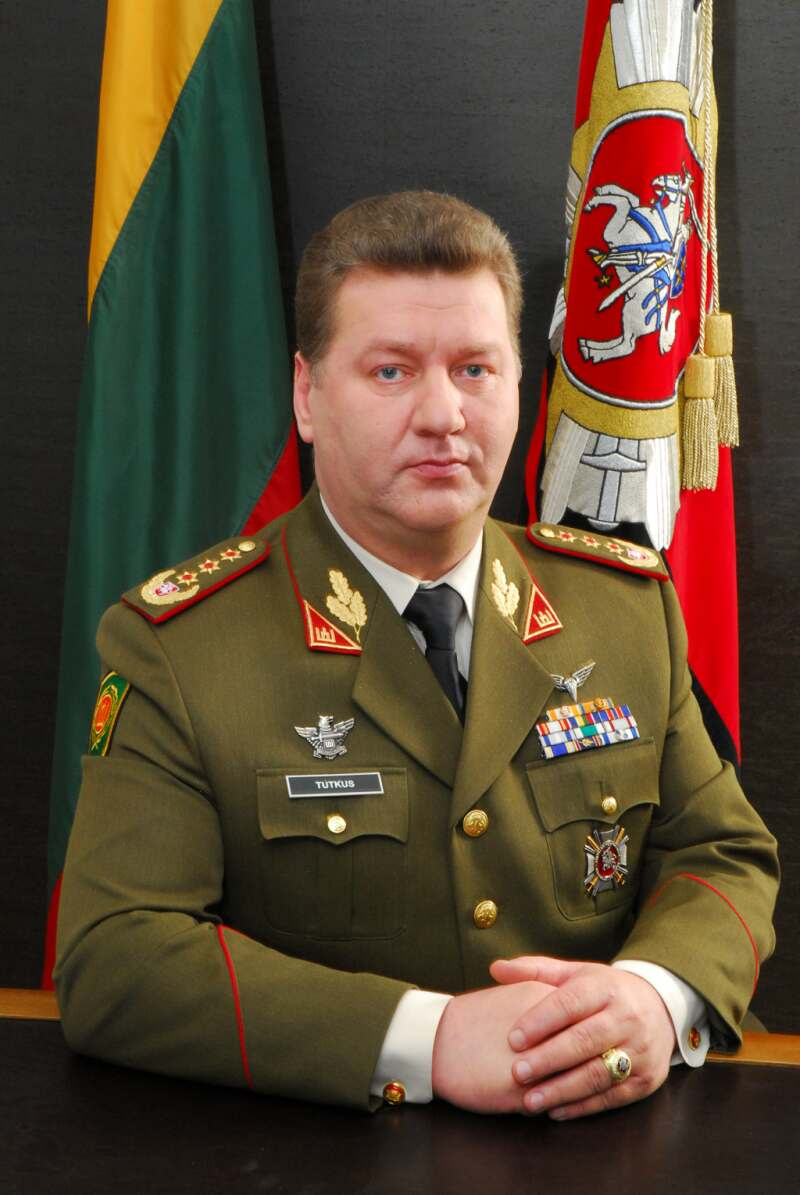
- Born: December 27, 1960 (age 65); Vilnius, Lithuanian SSR, Soviet Union
- Military career
- Allegiance: USSR; Lithuania
- Branch: Soviet Army; Lithuanian Land Force
- Service years: 1978–2009
- Rank: Lieutenant general
- Commands: Chief of Defence of Lithuania

3rd Chief of Defence of Lithuania
- In office 30 June 2004 – 3 July 2009
- President: Valdas Adamkus
- Minister: Juozas Olekas
- Preceded by: Jonas Kronkaitis
- Succeeded by: Arvydas Pocius

2nd and 4th Chief of the Defence Staff of Lithuania
- In office 3 January 1994 – 1 November 1996
- Preceded by: Stasys Knezys
- Succeeded by: Antanas Jurgaitis
- In office 3 February 1992 – 1 February 1993
- Preceded by: Norbertas Vidrinskas
- Succeeded by: Stasys Knezys

Lieutenant General Valdas Tutkus (born 27 December 1960) is a Lithuanian former military officer and politician. He served as the Chief of Defence of the Republic of Lithuania from 2004 until 2009, having previously served as Commander of the Lithuanian Land Forces from 2001 to 2004.

== Biography ==
From 1978 to 1982, he studied at the Tashkent Higher All-Arms Command School. After 1982, he became a platoon commander. and in 1983 was sent to Afghanistan as part of units of the Turkestan Military District's 40th Army. From 1988 to 1991, he studied at the Frunze Military Academy in Moscow. By 1991, Tutkus withdrew from the Soviet Armed Forces and became a founding member of the modern Lithuanian Armed Forces.

After the restoration of independence, he served in the 'Iron Wolf' Mechanised Infantry Brigade. In 1995, he was sent to the NATO Defense College in Rome. From 1999 to 2001, he served as Military Representative of the Republic of Lithuania to NATO and the European Union. This was concurrent to the post of Defense Attaché to the Kingdom of Belgium. From 2001 to 2004, he was Commander of the Lithuanian Land Forces. At the end of his term, he became Commander of the Lithuanian Armed Forces. On 24 July 2009, Arvydas Pocius was assigned as Chief of Defence and Tutkus was dismissed. From 2014 to 2015, he was Director of the Lithuanian Defense and Security Industry Association.

=== Political career ===
On 5 October 2023, Tutkus announced his intention to run as a candidate in the 2024 Lithuanian presidential election, supported by the Party "Together with the Vytis", formerly known as the Lithuanian Pensioners' Party. In his electoral program, he supports nationalization of strategic sectors of the economy, abandoning the Euro and restoring the litas, opposition to LGBT rights and maintaining friendly relations with both Ukraine and Russia.

Tutkus unsuccessfully participated in the 2024 Lithuanian parliamentary election as the representative of the Lithuanian Christian Democracy Party and later became party's interim chairman after the retirement of Mindaugas Puidokas.

In 2025, Valdas Tutkus returned to the Lithuanian Regions Party, of which he is the founder. In 2024, he left the party due to disagreements with its leaders.

== Personal life ==
He is married to Lilija, and has a son named Vytautas.

== Awards ==
- Nominal Weapon (2001)
- Order of the Cross of Vytis
- Cross of the Officer of Vytautas the Great Order
- Commemorative Badge of Russian Army withdrawal from Lithuania
- Medal of Merit of National Defence System
