= Silvestras Žukauskas =

Lithuanian general

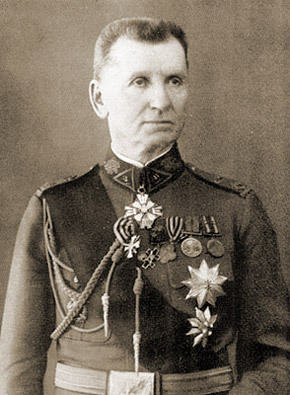
- General Silvestras Žukauskas in Lithuanian uniform
- Born: 31 December 1860 (Note: There is some ambiguity about the year of birth. Many documents from his lifetime list the year as 1864. His death certificate lists 1860 which is used by most reference works. His baptismal records have not been located. (Dručkus 2017)); Poškiečiai, Kovno Governorate, Russian Empire
- Died: 26 November 1937 (aged 76); Ramučiai, Lithuania
- Military career
- Allegiance: Russian Empire (1881–1918); Lithuania (1918–1928)
- Branch: Imperial Russian Army; Lithuanian Armed Forces
- Service years: 1881–1928
- Rank: General
- Commands: 314th Novooskolsk Infantry Regiment; 1st Infantry Division; Commander of the Lithuanian Army
- Conflicts: Russo-Japanese War; First World War; Lithuanian–Soviet War; Polish–Lithuanian War

Silvestras Žukauskas (Polish: Sylwester Żukowski, Russian: Сильве́стр Константи́нович Жуко́вский, romanized: Silvester Konstantinovich Zhukovsky; 31 December 1860 – 26 November 1937) was a Lithuanian General. He first served in the Imperial Russian Army, where he distinguished himself during World War I, rising to the rank of major general and ending the war as divisional commander. Later he joined the Lithuanian Army and was its Chief Commander three times: May–September 1919, February–June 1920, and June 1923 to January 1928.

Žukauskas joined the Imperial Russian Army in 1881, studying at the Vilnius Military School from 1883 to 1887, reaching the rank of polkovnik in 1913. When World War I started, he commanded the new 314th Novooskolsk Infantry Regiment, fighting at its head in present-day Poland, Lithuania, and Latvia. He was demobilized in February 1918, when Germans captured most of the 1st Infantry Division which he commanded.

In early 1919, as Chief of the General Staff of the newly created Lithuanian Army, he pushed the invading Soviet forces out of Lithuania by the end of August 1919 with a successful offensive. However, he was dismissed from command as the organizers of the Polish coup d'état attempt planned to make him a military dictator. Although Žukauskas was likely unaware of this plot, he was known as a Polish sympathizer, speaking Polish, and generally faced resistance from younger Lithuanian officers. These tensions forced him out of the command twice more, but he was brought back in February 1920 after communist-inspired soldier's mutiny in Kaunas and in October 1920 following the Lithuanian defeat in the Battle of Sejny. He commanded Lithuanian forces fighting against Żeligowski's Mutiny in Autumn 1920. He is reputed as a key figure in the Lithuanian Wars of Independence. He resigned from active military duty in June 1921, being brought back from retirement in June 1923 as the Lithuanian Army's commander until January 1928.

In 1927, on the 40 year anniversary of Žukauskas becoming an officer, the government gifted him the Davalgonys estate near Ramučiai, which was frequently visited by Lithuania's president Antanas Smetona and his wife. During this final retirement, Žukauskas became a founder of Amlit and its nominal manager. The company built bicycles, cars, buses and car garages.

== Biography ==
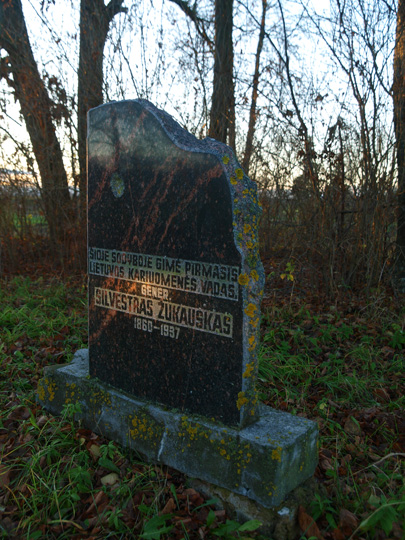
Memorial stone at the birthplace of Žukauskas

=== Russian Empire ===
==== Imperial Russian Army ====
Žukauskas was born on 31 December 1860 in the village of Poškiečiai near Pakruojis. He was born on the Saint Sylvester's Day and was likely named in the saint's honor. Very little is known about his parents; it is believed that they were landless nobles, possibly of Polish roots. After completing six grades at the Marijampolė Gymnasium, he enlisted with the 112th Ural Infantry Regiment, 28th Infantry Division of the Imperial Russian Army on 30 June 1881. From 1883 to 1887, he studied at Vilnius Military School. After the graduation, he was reassigned to the 109th Volga Infantry Regiment stationed in Šančiai. Žukauskas was born into a Roman Catholic family which made it difficult for him to pursue a military career as various Russification policies discriminated against the Catholics because they were seen as "unreliable" after the anti-Tsarist Uprising of 1863. In October 1894, he married Josephine Hasdorff (Juzefina Hasfordaitė) of German descent and Evangelical Lutheran faith. The marriage certificate listed Žukauskas' faith as Evangelical Reformed (Calvinism). This prompted his biographers to speculate whether his conversion was genuine or for career reasons.

In 1900, he was promoted to captain. In 1902, he was reassigned outside of the present-day Lithuania to the 127th Putivl Infantry Regiment stationed in Rivne in the present-day Ukraine. In July–August 1905, he completed artillery courses for officers in Orenburg and was assigned to the 33rd Infantry Division as the commander of its machine gun company. According to the interwar Lithuanian press, Žukauskas fought in the Russo-Japanese War (specifically, in the Battles of Liaoyang and Shaho), but this is not reflected in surviving service records of Žukauskas.

In February 1907, he was reassigned to the 131st Tiraspol Infantry Regiment. In 1908, he was promoted to podpolkovnik and given command of a battalion of the 131st Infantry Regiment. In 1913, he was promoted to polkovnik (colonel) and reassigned as junior assistant to the commander of the 176th Perevolochna Infantry Regiment.

==== World War I ====
As Russian Army mobilized in preparation for World War I, Žukauskas was reassigned as commander of the newly created 314th Novooskolsk Infantry Regiment which was being formed in Kursk. Until mid-October, the regiment was stationed at the Novogeorgievsk Fortress. It was then deployed in the Battle of the Vistula River and Battle of Łódź. The regiment fought near Sochaczew and Iłów. On 17 November, the regiment lost almost the entire 4th Battalion. On 20 November 1914, Žukauskas was injured in his left leg and returned to the front only in January 1915. The regiment continued to fight near Brochów and Święcieniec until 25 April.

On 4 May 1915, the 314th Infantry Regiment was moved to present-day Lithuania. It fought in the present-day Raseiniai District Municipality until mid-July 1915 when it was reassigned to the 3rd Army Corps and rapidly retreated from Šiauliai to Salos Manor. For the defence of Šiauliai, Žukauskas was awarded the Saint George Sword. On 28 July, the regiment was reassigned to the 37th Army Corps and was moved to Jaunjelgava to attack Nemunėlio Radviliškis and Biržai. On 14 August, Žukauskas became ill but returned to the front a month later. The regiment continued to fight on the right bank of the Daugava River near Koknese until 5 February 1916. In March, the regiment was assigned to the 60th Infantry Division and attacked on the left bank of the Daugava.

On 18 April 1916, Žukauskas was promoted to brigade commander of the 1st Infantry Division and continued securing positions along the Daugava. On 21 June 1916, while in the trenches, he was injured in the head by shrapnel. On 21 November 1916, he was promoted to major general. From December 1916 to July 1917, the division protected Daugavpils. On 31 May 1917, Žukauskas was promoted to commanders of the 1st Infantry Division. In August 1917, the division was moved to the reserves of the Southwestern Front in Volhynia. After the capture of Riga by the Germans in September 1917, the division was returned to present-day Estonia to guard the Baltic coast near Pärnu. In February 1918, while Žukauskas was on vacation, Germans took most of the division as prisoners of war. Division's remnants escaped to Smolensk where Žukauskas was demobilized. The demobilization was a result of Bolshevik policies to remove old Tsarist commanders from the army.

=== Lithuanian Wars of Independence ===
==== Lithuanian–Soviet War ====
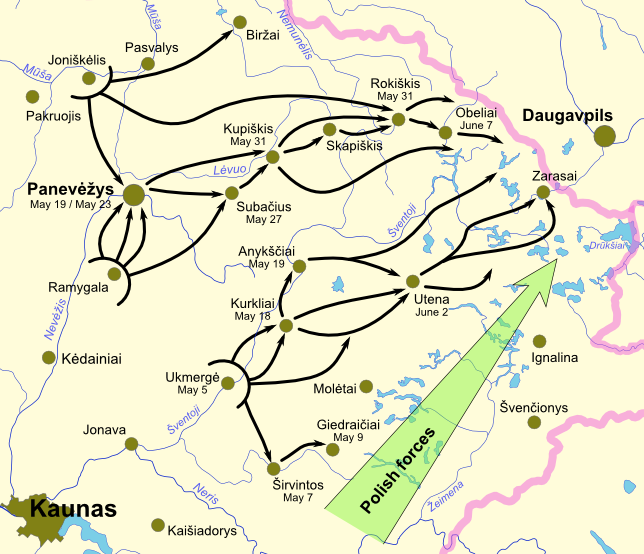
Lithuanian offensive in May–June 1919. Dates indicate when the town was taken by Lithuanian forces. The pink line marks the border of Lithuania since 1990.

After leaving the Russian Imperial Army, Žukauskas temporarily lived in Kyiv. In December 1918, he arrived in Vilnius and was immediately appointed as Minister of Defence in the newly formed government of Prime Minister Augustinas Voldemaras. However, Žukauskas did not assume the position because he became seriously ill with typhus and later with pneumonia. He was officially dismissed from the ministry on 24 December 1918 and departed to Warsaw to seek treatment. After recovering, he returned to Lithuania and became Chief of the General Staff on 26 April 1919. At the time, the newly formed Lithuanian Army was facing the invading Bolshevik forces that captured roughly 2/3 of the Lithuanian territory. Up to that point, the Lithuanian Army only engaged in small-scale defensive actions.

Žukauskas decided to mount an offensive in northeastern Lithuania. The first objective was to take over Ukmergė which was accomplished on 3 May. The operation was risky as for awhile Kėdainiai was unprotected opening a path to Kaunas, but also very successful: some 500 Soviet soldiers were taken prisoner and about 50 Poles, captured by the Soviets in the battles near Vilnius, were liberated and returned to Poland. On 7 May, Lithuanians entered Širvintos, where they found Polish troops. Lithuanians and Poles mounted a joint operation to take Giedraičiai on 9 May. These were the first larger successful offensive operations by the Lithuanian Army.

On 7 May, Žukauskas assumed command of the entire Lithuanian Army and initiated a complete reorganization of the Lithuanian forces into two groups. The first brigade, stationed in Ukmergė, was known as the Vilkmergė Group and was ordered to push along the Utena–Zarasai line. The second brigade, was known as the Panevėžys Group, was charged with capturing Panevėžys and then pushing along the Kupiškis–Rokiškis–Obeliai line. On 18 May, the reorganized army carried out its first operation and captured Kurkliai and Anykščiai. The army successfully pushed forward and captured one town after another. By mid-June, Lithuanians had the Soviets cornered in a small region around Zarasai. After more than a month of the relatively stable front, the Lithuanians attacked on 23–29 August and pushed the Soviets across the Daugava River. On 28–29 June, Žukauskas distributed the first military awards, then merely a ribbon, which later became the Cross of Vytis.

Žukauskas frequently visited the front lines and commanded the men directly earning, the trust and respect of Lithuanian soldiers. When the enemy was driven out from the Lithuanian territory and across the Daugava River, Žukauskas planned to redeploy the main Lithuanian forces elsewhere, including protection of the demarcation line with Poland and the planned attacks against the Bermontians in northern Lithuania. However, on 26 September 1919, Žukauskas was dismissed as commander of the army because of his role in the Polish coup d'état attempt in August 1919.

==== Polish coup d'état attempt ====
Poland's Chief of State Józef Piłsudski sought a union with Lithuania in hopes of reviving the old Polish–Lithuanian Commonwealth (see Międzymorze federation). He planned a coup d'état to be carried out by the Polish Military Organization (PMO). During the coup, the rebels were to replace the Council of Lithuania and the Lithuanian government by a pro-Polish cabinet and Žukauskas as a military dictator of the new Lithuanian government. Žukauskas most likely was not aware of the plot, but undoubtedly had strong connections to Poland, spoke Polish and gained a reputation of a Polish sympathizer. One of his contemporaries, Vincas Grigaliūnas-Glovackis, called Žukauskas as "of Polish culture" and "close to Poles and Russians". Historians have noted Žukauskas' sympathy towards Poland. In early August he had a meeting in Kaunas with major Tadeusz Kasprzycki, Piłsudski's envoy to Lithuania, during which he supposedly said that he considers himself Polish and that he took the lead of Lithuanian Army only to bring about an agreement with Poland. Žukauskas did not have children but adopted and raised his niece who lived in Poland and was engaged to a Polish military officer. During the action of Lithuanian intelligence against the Polish Military Organisation in Kaunas on the night of 28–29 August he was almost arrested by Liudas Gira, but saved only by the personal intervention of President Antanas Smetona; Gira supposedly called him a "Polish adherent who cannot be trusted". Nonetheless, his aide-de-camps general Witold Dołęga-Otocki (Vytautas Otockis, later colonel in the Polish Army) and Leonardas Vojtekūnas were arrested. Žukauskas helped them to get released during their trials.

Žukauskas was removed as Chief Commander of the Lithuanian Army but continued to serve in the General Staff as deputy commander for special matters. He was later appointed as a Lithuanian representative to the Entente commission, chaired by French General Henri Niessel, that was tasked with overseeing the evacuation of the Bermontians from the Baltic States. He later supervised the transfer of equipment and other property from the Bermontians to Lithuania.

==== Polish–Lithuanian War ====
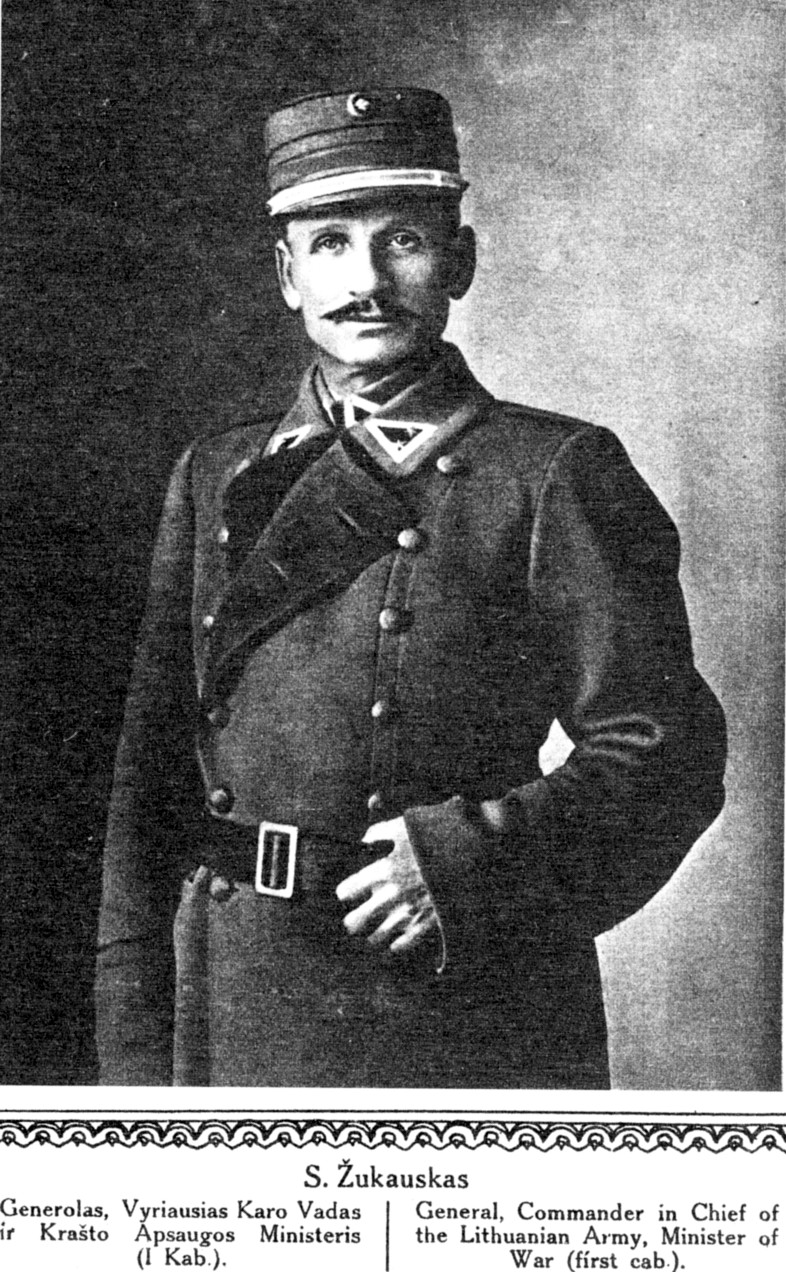
Žukauskas as the commander of the Lithuanian Army in 1920

Žukauskas took an active role in suppressing the mutiny of soldiers on 21–23 February 1920 in Kaunas. On February 23, he was once again named Chief Commander of the Lithuanian Army replacing Pranas Liatukas, who was arrested by the rebels.

In mid-March 1920, Žukauskas requested a vacation. Poland launched an offensive towards Kyiv where his family members still resided waiting for an opportune time to return to Lithuania. While waiting for Poland to capture the city, he stayed in Vilnius where he met with Jurgis Aukštuolaitis, one of the organizers of the Polish coup d'état in August 1919, and published an article in the bilingual newspaper Suvienytoji Lietuva / Zjednoczona Litwa advocating for a union between Lithuania and Poland. This stirred controversy among Lithuanian soldiers and deepened their suspicions that Žukauskas was a Polish sympathizer. He took his family from Kyiv but did not return to Lithuania; he stayed in Vilnius and asked to retire from the Lithuanian Army. President Smetona accepted his request on 14 June 1920. There were rumours that he was offered a high-ranking post in the Polish Army. Reportedly, he attempted to organise Polish resistance against the approaching Bolsheviks in Vilnius. He supposedly was trying to take over the command of the city's defence, which led to disagreements with Polish officers already in place. He went back to Kaunas on 12 July, two days before the fall of the city, and the day of the signing of the peace treaty between Lithuania and Soviet Russia.

Žukauskas asked to join the Lithuanian Army and was appointed as inspector of military formations on 12 August 1920. The decision was met with resistance from many younger Lithuanian officers. After the Lithuanian loss in the Battle of Sejny against Poland, Kazys Ladiga was dismissed as commander of the army on 1 October. Reluctantly, Žukauskas agreed to command the armed forces (though he was not the Chief Commander of the Lithuanian Army). On 8 October, Poland launched the Żeligowski's Mutiny. Unprepared, Lithuanian troops were forced to withdraw from Vilnius. On 17–21 November, Lithuanian forces successfully pushed back Żeligowski's men from Širvintos and Giedraičiai. Žukauskas was actively directing the Lithuanian forces at the front. The hostilities ceased as the League of Nations attempted to mediate the dispute.

When Konstantinas Žukas resigned as commander of the Lithuanian Army and Minister of Defence on 7 April 1921, Žukauskas in effect was the highest-ranking military commander in Lithuania. However, he continued to face suspicions and criticism over his links to Poland. There were rumours that during the key battles near Širvintos he was hunting with graf Przeździecki in Rokiškis. He also actively defended his aide-de-camp during the trial of the members of the Polish Military Organization (PMO) who organized the coup of August 1919. Reportedly, during his meeting with Eugeniusz Romer on 12 March 1920, Žukauskas said that the quality of the Lithuanian Army decreased after the dismissal of Polish officers and their replacement with inexperienced Lithuanian officers. Many considered Žukauskas to be a good soldier, but a poor and naïve politician. As a result, the president dismissed Žukauskas from the command on 29 May 1921. A month later, on 25 June, Žukauskas resigned from active military duty and became a reserve officer.

=== Interwar Lithuania ===
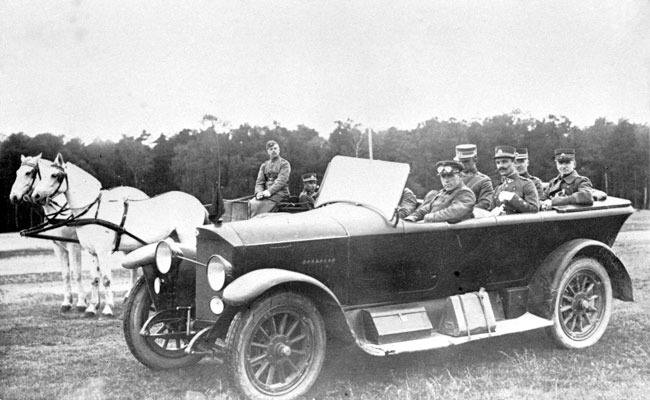
Silvestras Žukauskas after the military exercise in Klaipėda, 1925

Upon being recalled into military service by President Aleksandras Stulginskis, Žukauskas served once again as the commander of the Lithuanian Army from 6 June 1923 to 26 January 1928. During peacetime, he focused on improving military discipline and education and made efforts to remain close to the men. He was not interested in the work of the General Staff or various organizational matters. Žukauskas supported the coup d'état of December 1926 that brought President Antanas Smetona to power. During the coup, he visited various military units explaining the coup to soldiers and ensuring their discipline.

Žukauskas resigned from active military duty on 26 January 1928 due to his old age. He retired to Davalgoniai Manor in Ramučiai that was gifted to him by the Lithuanian government in 1927. He continued to participate in military organizations and advise General Stasys Raštikis (commander of the Lithuanian Army in 1935–1940) and President Smetona.

Žukauskas died on 26 November 1937. His funeral was a public affair: his body was placed for public viewing at the Vytautas the Great War Museum. A three-day mourning period was announced for the Lithuanian Army and the Lithuanian Riflemen's Union. His coffin was guarded by generals and speeches were given by President Smetona, General Raštikis, and others. He was buried in the Lutheran section of the Kaunas City Old Cemetery.

=== Remembrance ===
Žukauskas' grave was demolished in 1959 after the occupying Soviet authorities converted the Kaunas City Old Cemetery into Ramybė Park. Despite archaeological excavation efforts carried out in 2012, the original grave was never found.

== Commands ==
Žukauskas held the following commands in the Lithuanian Army:

- Chief of the General Staff
  - 26 April – 27 May 1919
- Chief Commander of the Lithuanian Army
  - 7 May – 26 September 1919
  - 23 February – 14 June 1920
  - 6 June 1923 – 26 January 1928
- Commander of the Armed Forces
  - 1 October 1920 – 29 May 1921

== Awards ==
- 1889: Order of Saint Stanislaus, 3rd class
- 1889: Order of Saint Anna, 3rd class
- 1905: Order of Saint Stanislaus, 2nd class
- 1912: Order of Saint Anna, 2nd class
- 1914: Order of Saint Vladimir, 4th class
- 1915: Order of Saint Vladimir, 3rd class
- 1915: Order of Saint Anna, 4th class
- 1915: Saint George Sword (for defense of Šiauliai)
- 1919: Order of the Cross of Vytis, 4th and 5th degree
- 1926: Czechoslovak War Cross 1918
- 1927: Order of the Cross of Vytis, 1st degree
- 1927: Order of the Lithuanian Grand Duke Gediminas, 1st degree
- 1929: Order of Lāčplēsis, 2nd class

== Sources ==
- Aničas, Jonas (2005). "Generolas Silvestras Žukauskas" (PDF). Žiemgala (in Lithuanian). I. ISSN 1648-7230.
- Biržiška, Vaclovas (1990) [1963]. Aleksandrynas: senųjų lietuvių rašytojų, rašiusių prieš 1865 m., biografijos, bibliografijos ir biobibliografijos (in Lithuanian). Vol. II (2nd ed.). Vilnius: Sietynas. OCLC 28707188.
- Čekutis, Ričardas; Žygelis, Dalius (January 29, 2007). "Laisvės kryžkelės. 1918–1920 m. laisvės kovos" (in Lithuanian). Bernardinai.lt.
- Dručkus, Gintaras (May 2017). "Apie generolą Silvestrą Žukauską". Pasaulio Lietuvis (in Lithuanian). ISSN 1732-0135.
- Kilinskas, Kęstutis (2017). ""Lithuanian nationalists" against "Imperial Russians"?. Generational conflicts between senior Lithuanian army officers" (PDF). Acta historica universitatis Klaipedensis. 34: 81–99. doi:10.15181/ahuk.v34i0.1613.
- Lesčius, Vytautas (2004). Lietuvos kariuomenė nepriklausomybės kovose 1918–1920 (PDF). Lietuvos kariuomenės istorija (in Lithuanian). Vilnius: General Jonas Žemaitis Military Academy of Lithuania. ISBN 9955-423-23-4. Archived from the original (PDF) on 2015-01-02.
- Łossowski, Piotr (1996). Konflikt polsko-litewski 1918–1920 (in Polish). Książka i Wiedza. ISBN 83-05-12769-9.
- Lukšas, Aras (26 November 2010). ""Kol gyvas, būsiu su kariuomene…"" (in Lithuanian). Lietuvos žinios.
- Markuckytė, Elena; Pilkauskas, Donatas (30 July 2011). "Generolas Silvestras Žukauskas" (in Lithuanian). Respublika.lt.
- Ružancovas, Aleksandras (1938). "Nuo kariūno iki generolo-majoro (Medžiaga a. a. generolo S. Žukausko biografijai, 1883–1918 metai)". Kardas (in Lithuanian). 22 (300): 531–535.
- Šeškevičius, Kęstutis (2013). "Kauno senosios kapinės Vytauto prospekte" (PDF). In Zabiela, Gintautas (ed.). Archeologiniai tyrinėjimai Lietuvoje 2012 metais (in Lithuanian). Kultūros paveldo departamentas, Lietuvos archeologijos draugija. pp. 207–208. ISSN 1392-5512.
- Surgailis, Gintautas (1992). Lietuvos kariuomenės vadai (in Lithuanian). Vilnius: Mintis. ISBN 5-417-00513-4.
- Surgailis, Gintautas (2008). "Silvestras Žukauskas". In Surgailis, Gintautas (ed.). Lietuvos krašto apsaugos ministrai ir kariuomenės vadai (in Lithuanian). Vol. II. Lietuvos Respublikos krašto apsaugos ministerija. ISBN 978-9986-738-98-5.
- Varnas, Mykolas (13 April 2018). "Bolševikus išspyręs kariuomenės vadas" (in Lithuanian). Lietuvos žinios. Archived from the original on 8 April 2019.
