= Raimundas Vaikšnoras =

7th Chief of Defence of Lithuania

General Raimundas Vaikšnoras
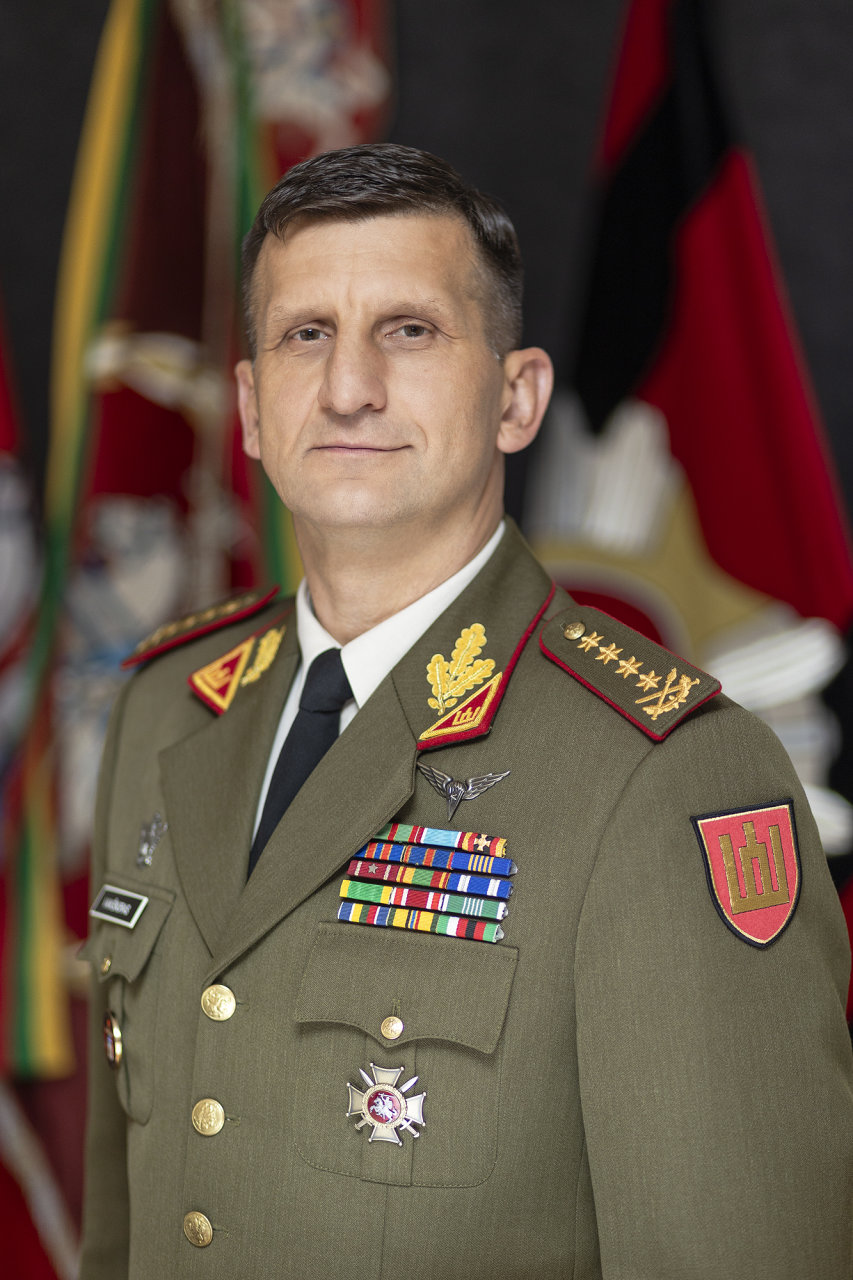
- Official portrait, 2024

7th Chief of Defence of Lithuania
- Incumbent
- Assumed office 24 July 2024
- President: Gitanas Nausėda
- Minister: Dovilė Šakalienė
- Preceded by: Valdemaras Rupšys

Commander of the Lithuanian Land Forces
- In office 24 July 2019 – 21 July 2022
- President: Gitanas Nausėda
- Minister: Raimundas Karoblis; Arvydas Anušauskas
- Preceded by: Valdemaras Rupšys
- Succeeded by: Artūras Radvilas

Personal details
- Born: 12 July 1970 (age 56) Druskininkai, Lithuania
- Education: General Jonas Žemaitis Military Academy of Lithuania
- Occupation: Military officer

Military service
- Allegiance: Lithuania
- Branch/service: Lithuanian Armed Forces
- Years of service: 1990-present
- Rank: General

General Raimundas Vaikšnoras (Lithuanian: [ˈrɐɪ̯mʊndɐs vɐɪ̯kʃˈnoːrɐs]; born 12 July 1970) is a Lithuanian military officer and general, currently serving as the 7th Chief of Defence of the Republic of Lithuania since 24 July 2024.

General Vaikšnoras has been recognized with several awards, including the Commemorative Badge to Mark Russian Troops Withdrawal from Lithuania, the Medal of the Founding Volunteers of the Lithuanian Army, and the Honor Badge “Iron Wolf.” He is also a member of the Union of Founding Volunteers of the Lithuanian Armed Forces.

== Biography ==
In 2002, he graduated from the General Jonas Žemaitis Military Academy of Lithuania, receiving a Bachelor's degree in Public Administration. In 2013, he graduated from the United States Army War College, receiving a Master's degree in Strategic Defense Studies.

On 11 March 1990, he took the military oath for Lithuania.

While serving in the Lithuanian Armed Forces, Raimundas Vaikšnoras commanded a motorized assault platoon and company, two battalions located in Vilnius and Rukla, was the commander of the Mechanized Infantry Brigade "Iron Wolf", performed other leadership duties as a staff officer in units of the Lithuanian Armed Forces, and participated in the international operation in Afghanistan.

== Military career ==
From 1991, Raimundas Vaikšnoras served as a Rifleman and Master Sergeant, later rising through the ranks to become a Lieutenant in 1992, First Lieutenant in 1994, Captain in 1997, Major in 2002, Lieutenant Colonel in 2008, Colonel in 2012, Brigadier General in 2018, and ultimately reaching the rank of General in 2024.

== Service in the Lithuanian Armed Forces ==
From 1991, Raimundas Vaikšnoras began his military career as an Intelligence Specialist in the Training Unit of the National Defence Department, taking the Serviceman's Oath on 11 March 1991. He then served as a Rifleman and Section Leader in the Training Unit. In 1992, he became a Platoon Commander in the Vilnius Motorized Infantry Battalion, later serving as Motorized Infantry Company Commander in 1993. By 1997, he was appointed Senior Instructor of Topography and Chief of Staff at the Peace Support Forces Training Centre. In 1998, he became Chief Specialist in the Military Training Branch at the Rukla Training Regiment, later commanding the 2nd Training Battalion there in 1999.

In 2000, he transitioned to the Defence Planning Branch of the Lithuanian Ministry of Defence as an Analysis Senior Specialist, and in 2001, he continued his role there as a Senior Specialist. By 2005, he was Chief of the Operations Control Centre at the Field Forces Headquarters of the Lithuanian Armed Forces. From 2006 to 2007, he served in an international mission in Afghanistan with the ISAF, Regional Command West. In 2007, he became the Commander of the Lithuanian Grand Duke Gediminas Staff Battalion, holding this position until 2010, when he was appointed Deputy Chief of Staff Operations at the Land Force Headquarters.

In 2013, Vaikšnoras took command of the Mechanized Infantry Brigade "Iron Wolf" and in 2016, he became the Chief of the Operations Department (J3) at the Joint Staff of the Lithuanian Armed Forces. By 2018, he was Deputy Chief of Staff Operations at the Defence Staff. In 2019, he was appointed Commander of the Lithuanian Land Forces and served in this role until 2022. He then took the position of Assistant Chief of Staff Plans (J7) at the Headquarters Allied Joint Force Command in Brunssum before becoming the Chief of Defence of Lithuania in 2024.
