= Paul's Military School =

Military school in St. Petersburg, Russia

The Paul's Military School or Pavel Military School (Russian: Павловское военное училище) (also translated as Pavlovsk Military School, Pavlovsk Military College) was a military school in St. Petersburg, Russia, established in 1863 on the basis of the Paul's Cadet Corps. It was closed in November 1917 after the October Revolution. It was named after emperor Paul I.

== History of the school ==
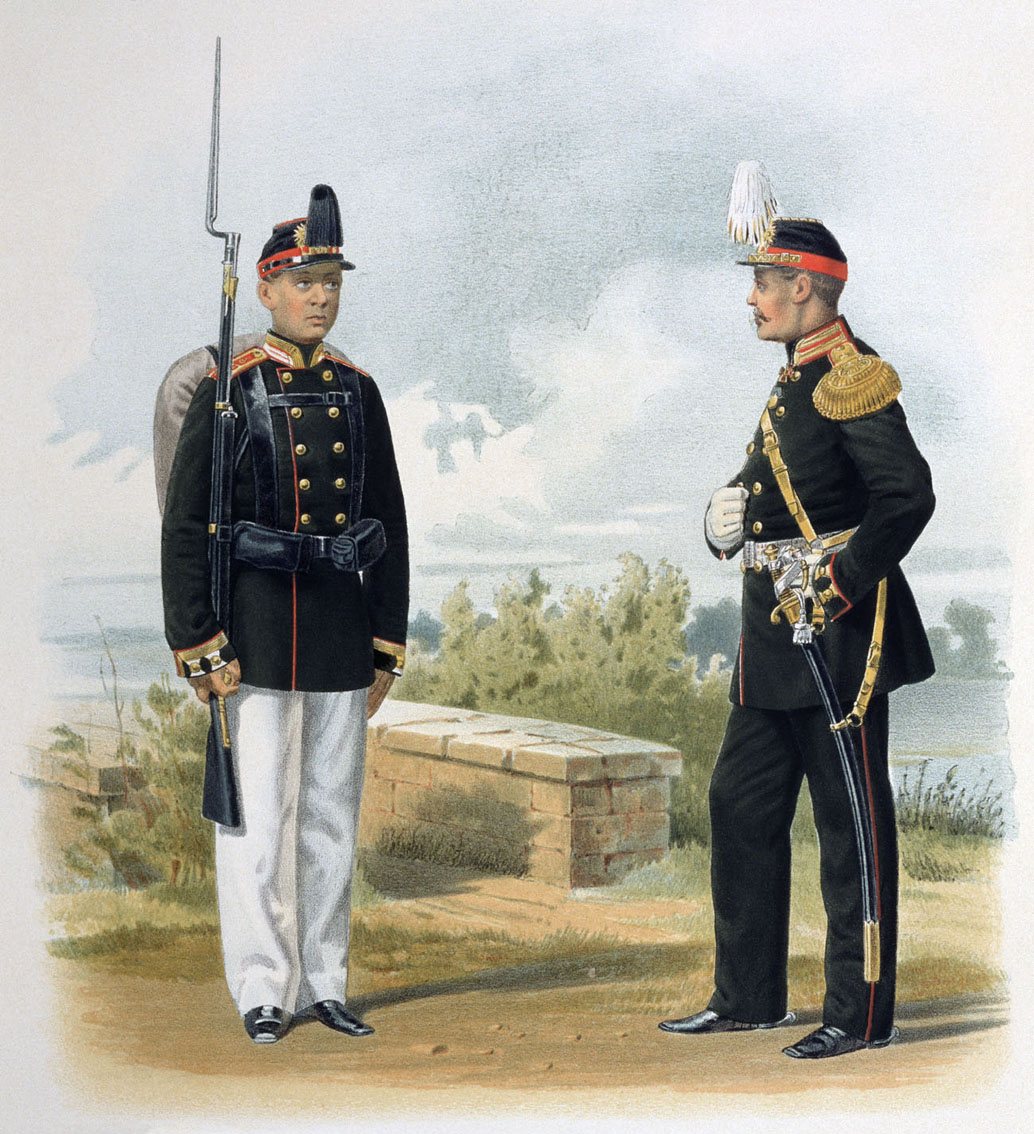
Cadet and General in full dress uniform of the Paul's Military School in 1864

On August 25, 1863, during the reorganization of military educational institutions, the Paul's Cadet Corps was abolished, and its seniority was transferred to the Paul's Military School. The first appointed head of school was Pyotr Vannovsky. The school was given the building and archives of the First Cadet Corps.

Over the 50 years of its existence, the school trained 7,730 officers, 52 graduates became Knights of the Order of St. George, 124 graduates died on the battlefields. By 1913, 1/4 of the available officers of the General Staff consisted of graduates.

The school did not take part in the October revolution, because on the night of October 25 it was surrounded by soldiers of the reserve Grenadier regiment and Red Guards of the Putilov and Obukhov factories, and disarmed under the threat of machine-gun fire. The entire command staff, together with the head of the school, General Melnikov, was arrested and sent to the Peter and Paul Fortress. On November 6, 1917, the school was disbanded.

== Location ==
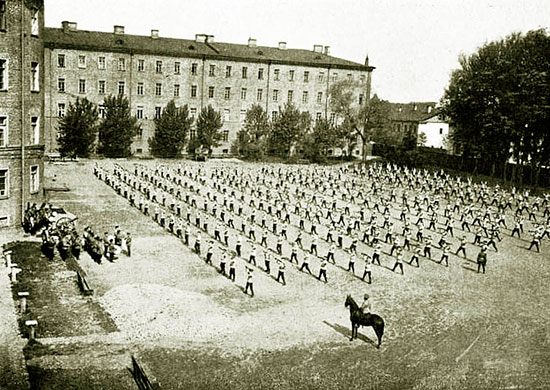
The parade ground of the 1st Paul's Military School. Photo of 1908

Prior to September, 1864, the school was located in the building of the barracks of the Noble Regiment. From September 16, 1864 to November 24, 1887, the school was located in St. Petersburg, in the buildings of the 1st Cadet Corps on Vasilyevsky Island next to the Menshikov Palace.

Due to renovation work in the palace, on November 24, 1887, the school was transferred back to the St. Petersburg side, to the building of the former Noble Regiment, where it was located until disbandment in November 1917.

== Alumni ==
- Aleksey Kuropatkin
- Baron Roman von Ungern-Sternberg
- Anatoly Pepelyayev
