= Valdemaras Rupšys =

Lithuanian general

General Valdemaras Rupšys
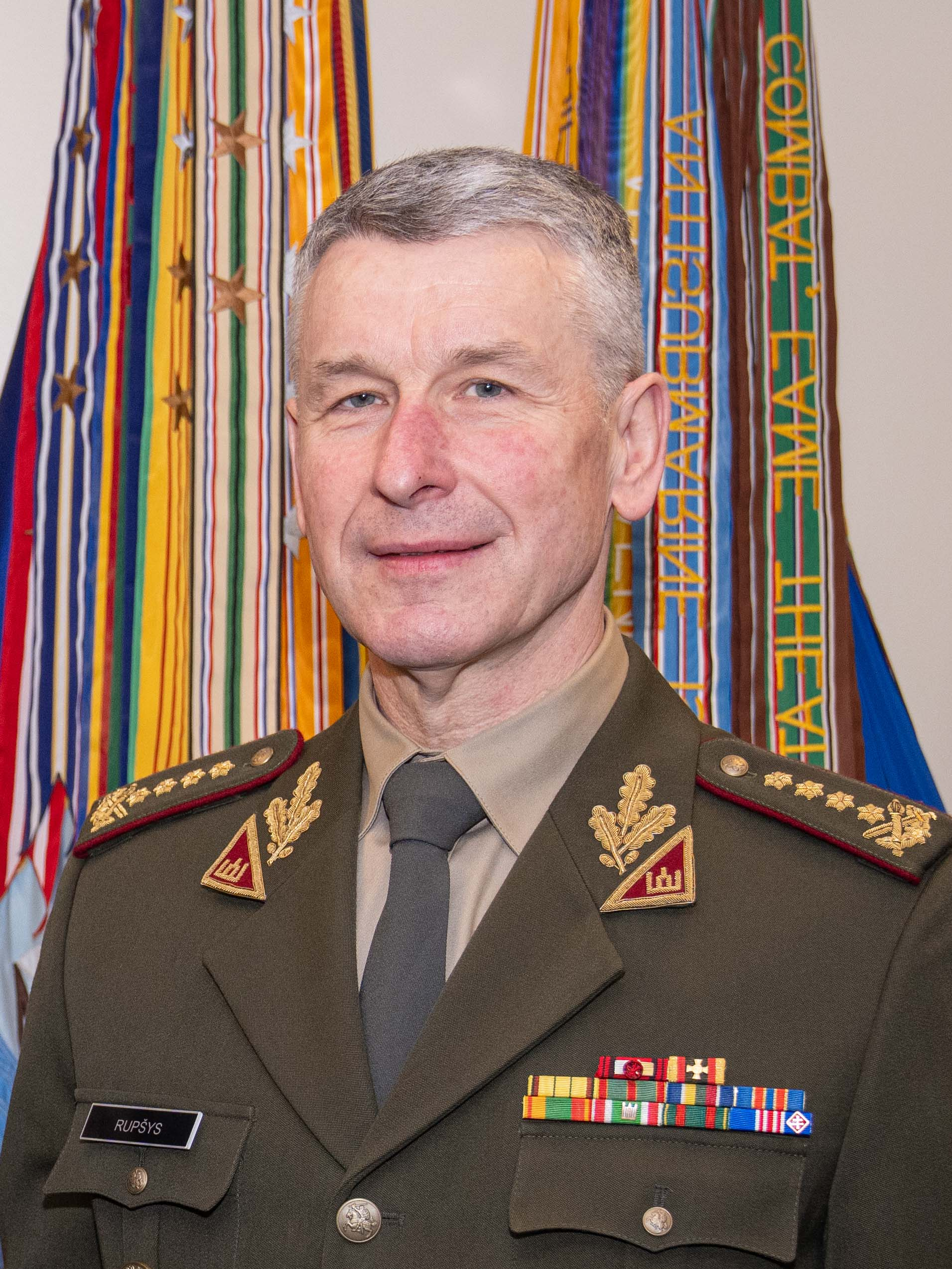
- Born: 25 May 1967
- Military career
- Allegiance: Lithuania
- Branch: Lithuanian Armed Forces
- Service years: 1990–2024
- Rank: General

6th Chief of Defence of Lithuania
- In office 25 July 2019 – 24 July 2024
- President: Gitanas Nausėda
- Minister: Arvydas Anušauskas; Laurynas Kasčiūnas
- Preceded by: Jonas Vytautas Žukas
- Succeeded by: Raimundas Vaikšnoras

General Valdemaras Rupšys (born 2 May 1967 in Šiauliai, Lithuania) is a Lithuanian military officer serving as Lithuanian Chief of Defence from 2019 to 2024.

He began his military career in the Lithuanian Armed Forces on 1 November 1990. In 2005, he was appointed to serve at the General Jonas Žemaitis Military Academy of Lithuania. In 2011, he was appointed to lead the Mechanised Infantry Brigade Iron Wolf. In 2016, he was appointed to the position of the Commander of the Land Forces, with the rank of brigadier general granted to him by the decree of President Dalia Grybauskaitė. In November 2018, commemorating the 100th anniversary of the restoration of the Lithuanian Armed Forces, he was awarded the rank of Major General. On 25 July 2019, he became Chief of Defence under President Gitanas Nausėda. On 10 July 2023, Rupšys was awarded the rank of four-star General.
