= 3rd Infantry Regiment (Lithuania) =

Former Lithuanian Army formation (1919–26; 1935–40)

3rd Infantry Regiment of the Lithuanian Grand Duke Vytautas
- Active: 4 May 1919–1 October 1926; 1935–26 October 1940
- Country: Lithuania
- Branch: Lithuanian Army
- Type: Infantry
- Size: 1,400 men (November 1919)
- Part of: 1st Division
- Garrison/HQ: HQ at Kėdainiai, Infantry in Raseiniai and Seredžius
- Engagements: Lithuanian Wars of Independence: Lithuanian–Soviet War (1919–1920); Polish-Lithuanian War (summer 1920)

3rd Infantry Regiment, later known as the 3rd Infantry Regiment of the Lithuanian Grand Duke Vytautas (Lithuanian: Trečiasis pėstininkų Lietuvos Didžiojo Kunigaikščio Vytauto pulkas) was a Lithuanian Army infantry regiment that saw combat in the Lithuanian Wars of Independence. It existed from 1919 to 1926 and from 1935 to 1940.

== Formation ==
The regiment began forming on 4 May 1919. In Raseiniai, the regiment was formed on the basis of the Šauliai Battalion under the guidance of the commander of the 1st Brigade Pranas Liatukas. On 26 February 1920, the regiment was given the name of the Grand Duke of Lithuania Vytautas.

== Lithuanian Wars of Independence ==
Since August 1919, the regiment fought against the Bolsheviks near Daugpilis.

In 1920, the regiment defended Lithuania against the invading Polish forces near Suvalkai, Kalvarija, distinguishing itself in the battles near Varėna, Lentvaris, Vievis. Thereafter, the 3rd Regiment guarded the demarcation line Vievis–Dubingiai–Zarasai.

== Interwar ==
On 1 October 1926, the regiment was disbanded, but it was reformed in 1935. The regiment's HQ was in Kėdainiai, and the regiments garrisoned Raseiniai and Seredžius.

When Soviet Union occupied Lithuania, the 3rd Regiment was disbanded. Most of the men were reassigned to the 256th Rifle Regiment of the Red Army.

== Commanders ==
- 1919 officer Pranas Liatukas
- 1919 officer Ignas Musteikis
- 1920 Major Jonas Gricius
- 1922–1924 Major Aleksandras Jakaitis
- 1925–1926 Colonel Vincas Šaudzis
- 1935–1939 Staff colonel Viktoras Giedrys
- 1939–1940 Colonel Petras Genys

== Sources ==
=== Books ===
- Lesčius, Vytautas (2004). Lietuvos Kariuomenė Nepriklausomybės Kovose 1918–1920 (PDF) (in Lithuanian). Vilnius: Generolo Jono Žemaičio Lietuvos karo akademija. ISBN 9955-423-23-4.
- Surgailis, Gintautas (2013). Trečiasis pėstininkų Didžiojo Lietuvos kunigaikščio Vytauto pulkas. Lietuvos kariuomenės istorija (in Lithuanian). Vilnius: Generolo Jono Žemaičio Lietuvos karo akademija. ISBN 9786098074130.
- Ruzgas, Vincas, ed. (1932). "VIII. Krašto apsauga". Visa Lietuva: Informacinė knyga 1931 m. (in Lithuanian). Kaunas: Spaudos Fondas.

=== Other ===
- http://www.archyvai.lt/lt/fondai/kariuomene/lcva_f516.html
