= 80th Infantry Division (Russian Empire) =

- 80-я пехотная дивизия
- Active: 1914–1918
- Country: Russian Empire
- Branch: Russian Imperial Army
- Role: Infantry
- Engagements: World War I; Battle of the Vistula River

The 80th Infantry Division (Russian: 80-я пехотная дивизия, 80-ya Pekhotnaya Diviziya) was an infantry formation of the Russian Imperial Army.

== Organization ==
- 1st Brigade
  - 317th Infantry Regiment
  - 318th Infantry Regiment
- 2nd Brigade
  - 319th Infantry Regiment
  - 320th Infantry Regiment
- 80th Artillery Brigade
