= Ramučiai =

- Village
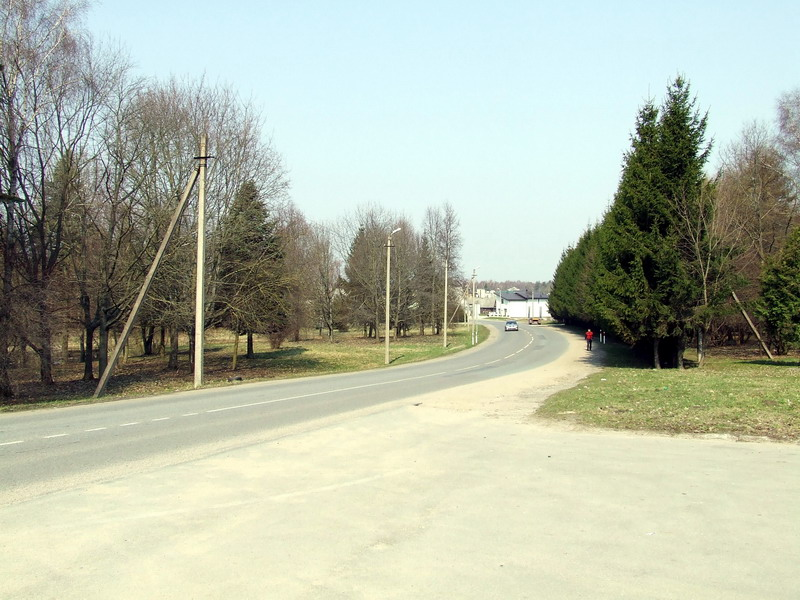

- Location of Ramučiai in Lithuania
- Coordinates: 54°56′50″N 24°01′50″E
- Country: Lithuania
- County: Kaunas County
- Municipality: Kaunas

Population (2011)
  - Total: 2,372
- Time zone: UTC+2 (EET)
  - Summer (DST): UTC+3 (EEST)

Ramučiai is a village in Kaunas district municipality, in Kaunas County, in central Lithuania. According to the 2011 census, the town has a population of 2,372 people.
