= Jonas Andriškevičius =

Lithuanian military figure

Major general Jonas Andriškevičius (born 29 July 1944 in Debeikiai, Anykščiai, Lithuania) was a Lithuanian military figure and ex-Soviet military officer. He was the first Chief of Defence of Lithuania. He served in this position from 20 October 1993 to 1 July 1999.

== Biography ==
Andriškevičius was born in 1944 in Debeikiai. He graduated from Jonas Biliūnas Middle School in Anykščiai. In 1966, he graduated from the Sergei Kirov Military Medical School in Leningrad and joined the Soviet Artillery, working in a unit fielding the D-20 howitzer. In 1976, he graduated from the Frunze Military Academy in Moscow. From 1967-1973, Andriškevičius served in the Group of Soviet Forces in East Germany. From 1979-1980, he was Chief of the Siberian Military District Operational Board. From 1981-1984, he served as Chief of Staff to the Chief Military Adviser of the Soviet Army to Ethiopia. Throughout the rest of the 80s, he was director of the Military Department at Vilnius University. After the restoration of independence, he served in the Civil Protection and Rescue Service of the Vilnius University Affairs Board. In 1997, he graduated from the one-year course at the NATO Defense College in Italy.

From 1992-1993, he was head of the Specialized Training Center of what is now the General Jonas Žemaitis Military Academy of Lithuania. In the fall of 1993, he became Chief of Defence. He served under Presidents Algirdas Brazauskas and Valdas Adamkus. He retired in 1999. Since 2004, Andriškevičius has been the Chairman of the Lithuanian Alumni Association of the NATO Defense College.

== Awards ==
- Order of the Cross of Vytis (21 April 1995)
- Order of the Lithuanian Grand Duke Gediminas (1 July 1999)
