= Chief of Defence (Lithuania) =

Chief of the Lithuanian Armed Forces

Chief of Defence of the Republic of Lithuania
- Lietuvos kariuomenės vadas
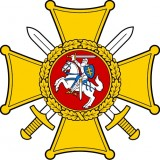
- Insignia of the Chief of Defence

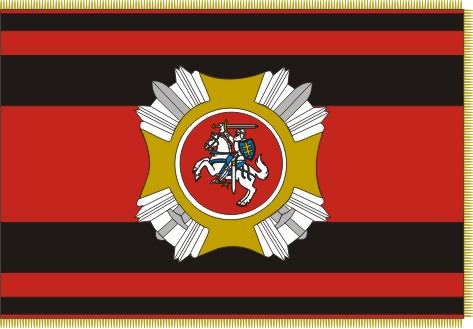
- Flag of the Chief of Defence

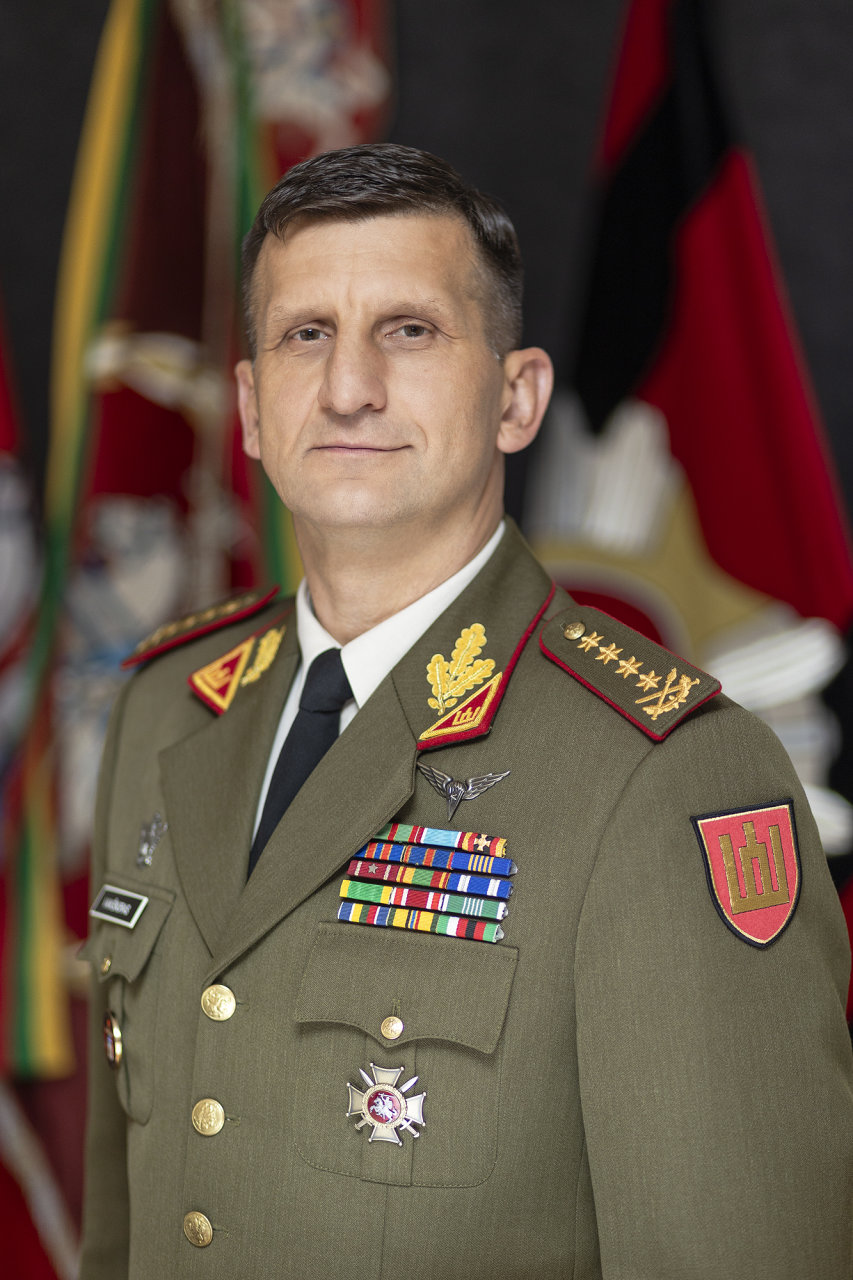
- Incumbent; General Raimundas Vaikšnoras since 24 July 2024
- Lithuanian Armed Forces
- Reports to: Minister of National Defence
- Nominator: Minister of National Defence
- Term length: 5 years
- Formation: 7 May 1919 (Historic); 20 October 1993
- First holder: Silvestras Žukauskas (Historic); Jonas Andriškevičius
- Website: kariuomene.lt

Chief of Defence of the Republic of Lithuania is Chief of the Lithuanian Armed Forces and the national defence organisations.

== List of Chiefs ==
=== Army Commanders (1919–1940) ===
No.	Portrait	Army Commander	Took office	Left office	Time in office	Ref.
1	Silvestras Žukauskas	General; Silvestras Žukauskas (1860–1937)	7 May 1919	26 September 1919	142 days	
-	Vladas Dionizas Slaboševičius	General; Vladas Dionizas Slaboševičius (1861–1919); Acting	26 September 1919	28 September 1919	2 days	
-	Pranas Liatukas	Lieutenant General; Pranas Liatukas (1876–1945); Acting	7 October 1919	23 February 1920	139 days	
(1)	Silvestras Žukauskas	General; Silvestras Žukauskas (1860–1937)	23 February 1920	14 June 1920	112 days	
-	Jonas Galvydis-Bykauskas	General; Jonas Galvydis-Bykauskas (1864–1943); Acting	9 April 1920	7 July 1920	89 days	
-	Konstantinas Žukas	Lieutenant General; Konstantinas Žukas (1885–1962); Acting	7 July 1920	7 April 1921	274 days	
-	Juozas Kraucevičius	Lieutenant General; Juozas Kraucevičius (1879–1964); Acting	29 May 1921	11 February 1922	258 days	
-	Juozas Stanaitis	Lieutenant General; Juozas Stanaitis (1865–1925); Acting	11 February 1922	5 June 1923	1 year, 114 days	
(1)	Silvestras Žukauskas	General; Silvestras Žukauskas (1860–1937)	6 June 1923	26 January 1928	4 years, 234 days	
2	Stasys Raštikis	Divisional general Stasys Raštikis (1896–1985)	1 January 1935	22 April 1940	5 years, 112 days	
3	Vincas Vitkauskas	Divisional general Vincas Vitkauskas (1890–1965)	22 April 1940	12 July 1940	81 days	

=== Chiefs of Defence (1993–present) ===
No.	Portrait	Chief of Defence	Took office	Left office	Time in office	Ref.
1	Jonas Andriškevičius	Major general Jonas Andriškevičius (born 1944)	20 October 1993	1 July 1999	5 years, 254 days	
2	Jonas Kronkaitis	Major general Jonas Kronkaitis (born 1935)	1 July 1999	30 June 2004	4 years, 365 days	–
3	Valdas Tutkus	Lieutenant general Valdas Tutkus (born 1960)	30 June 2004	3 July 2009	5 years, 3 days	
4	Arvydas Pocius	Lieutenant general Arvydas Pocius (born 1957)	24 July 2009	24 July 2014	5 years, 0 days	
5	Jonas Vytautas Žukas	Lieutenant general Jonas Vytautas Žukas (born 1962)	24 July 2014	25 July 2019	5 years, 1 day	
6	Valdemaras Rupšys	General; Valdemaras Rupšys (born 1967)	25 July 2019	24 July 2024	4 years, 365 days	
7	Raimundas Vaikšnoras	General; Raimundas Vaikšnoras (born 1970)	24 July 2024	Incumbent	2 years, 49 days	

== See also ==
- Lithuanian Armed Forces
