= List of Lithuanian Army units (1939) =

This is a list of formations of the Lithuanian Army in September 1939. At the very start of World War II in Europe on September 1, Lithuanian Army had a total of 22,508 serving in its ranks. On 16 September 1939, the Lithuanian government decided to partially mobilize the Lithuanian Army, which began the following day.

== Infantry Divisions ==
№	Date created	Commander	Ref.
1	11 March 1919	Brigade General Jonas Černius	
2	18 July 1919	Division General Edvardas Adamkavičius	
3	1 January 1920	Division General Mikas Rėklaitis	

== Infantry Regiments ==
№	Date created	Garrison location(s)	Commander	Notes	Ref.
1	23 November 1918	Ukmergė	Colonel of the General Staff Leonas Gustaitis		
2	5 December 1918	Kaunas, Jonava	Colonel Juozas Tumas		
3	4 May 1919	I (Kėdainiai), II (Raseiniai), III (Seredžius)	Col. Petras Genys	Disbanded on 31 August 1926; reconstituted in 1935.	
4	29 December 1918	Panevėžys, I (Kupiškis)	Col. of the Gen. Staff Vaclovas Žadeika		
5	2 March 1919	I (Aukštoji Panemunė), III (Prienai)	Col. of the Gen. Staff Albinas Čepas		
6	20 June 1919	Plungė, Telšiai	Col. Jonas Andrašūnas	Disbanded in 1926; reconstituted in 1935.	
7	1 July 1919	Tauragė, Tauragės Naumiestis	Col. of the Gen. Staff Antanas Breimelis		
8	12 May 1919	Šauliai, Varniai	Col. Andrius Butkūnas		
9	20 May 1919	I (Marijampolė), II (Vilkaviškis)	Col. of the Gen. Staff Antanas Gaušas		

== Cavalry Regiments ==
Formation name	Date created	Garrison location	Commander	Notes	Ref.
1st Hussar	11 January 1919	Kaunas	Col. Izidorius Kraunaitis		
2nd Uhlan	30 October 1920	Alytus	Acting Lieutenant colonel Kazys Labutis		
3rd Dragoon	1 October 1920	Tauragė	Col. Antanas Rėklaitis	Disbanded in 1924; reconstituted in 1935.	

== Artillery Regiments ==
№	Date created	Garrison location(s)	Commander	Notes	Ref.
1	6 January 1919	Ukmergė, Panevėžys, Kupiškis	Col. Alfonsas Sklėrius	Disbanded on 31 July 1926; reconstituted in 1935.	
2	19 October 1919	Kėdainia, Seredžius, Raseiniai	Col. Vincas Jasulaitis		
3	2 March 1920	Marijampolė, Kaunas, Prienai	Col. Petras Dočkus		
4	30 March 1920	Šiauliai, Tauragė, Plungė, Varniai	Col. Vladas Sidzikauskas		

== Combat Support ==
Formation name	Date created	Garrison location	Commander	Ref.
Anti-Aircraft Group	1935	Kaunas	Lieutenant Colonel Juozas Lavinskas	
Armoured Group	1 March 1920	Radviliškis	Lt. Con. of the General Staff Pranas Grebliauskas	
Auto Group	30 January 1919	Kaunas	Lt. Con. Kazys Babickas	
1st Engineer Battalion	13 January 1919	Kaunas	Lt. Con. Juozas Grigaliūnas	
2nd Engineer Battalion	1 August 1935	Radviliškis	Lt. Con. Jokūbas Baublys	
Signal Battalion	8 January 1918	Kaunas	Lt. Con. Marijonas Vitkauskas	

== Combat Service Support ==
Formation name	Date created	Commander	Sources
Lithuanian Army Quartermaster Department	4 December 1918	Intendant Brigade General Kazys Navakas	
War Supply Board	4 December 1918	Division General Zenonas Gerulaitis	
Armaments Board	29 January 1919	Col. Pranas Lesauskis	
Military Sanitary Board	4 December 1918	Brigade General Vladas Nagevičius (Nagius)	
Military Veterinary Board	1 February 1919	Col. Bronius Šikeris	

== Training establishments ==
Formation name	Date created	Location	Commander	Sources
War School of the First President of Lithuania	25 January 1919	Kaunas	General Jonas Juodišius	
Higher War School of Vytautas the Great	15 January 1920	Kaunas	Brigade General Vladas Karvelis	

== Sources ==
- Vaičenonis, Jonas (2002). "Lietuvos kariuomenės skaičiai 1920–1939 m." (PDF). Karo Archyvas (in Lithuanian). 17. Vilnius. Archived from the original (PDF) on 2022-12-15.
- Vaičenonis, Jonas (2004). Lietuvos karių uniformos ir lengvieji ginklai XX amžiuje (in Lithuanian). Vilnius. ISBN 9955-584-66-1.
- Jokubauskas, Vytautas (2012). "Lietuva ant karo slenksčio: 1939 m. kariuomenės mobilizacija". Karo Archyvas (in Lithuanian). 27. Vilnius: 275–330. doi:10.47459/ka.2012.27.6. S2CID 240264699.
