= Povilas Plechavičius =

Lithuanian military officer

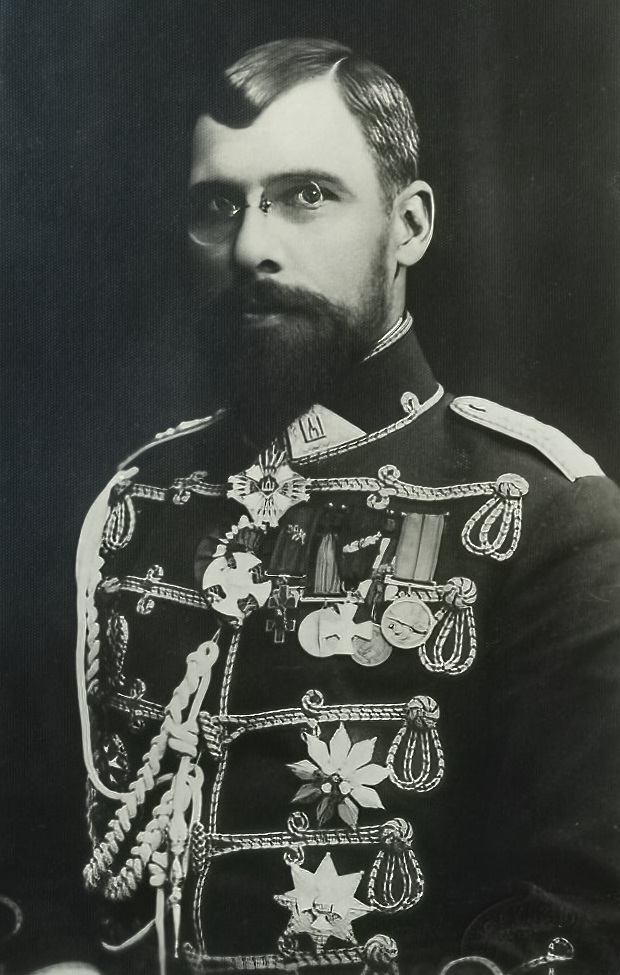
- Plechavičius, c. late 1920s
- Born: February 1, 1890; Bukančiai farmstead, Kovno Governorate, Russian Empire (now Židikai eldership, Mažeikiai district, Lithuania)
- Died: December 19, 1973 (aged 83); Chicago, Illinois, United States
- Occupations: General of the Lithuanian army
- Years active: November 23, 1918 – February 10, 1929
- Spouse: Irena Grinbergaitė (Plechavičienė after marriage) (1897–1983)
- Children: Irena Plechavičiūtė (1920–2001); Povilas Plechavičius (1923–2000); Norbertas Plechavičius (1926–?)
- Parent(s): Ignas Plechavičius (1852–1928); Konstancija Bukontaitė-Plechavičienė (1862–1959)

Povilas Plechavičius (1 February 1890 – 19 December 1973) was a Lithuanian military officer and statesman. His military career began in the Imperial Russian Army as a yunker during World War I. Then, Plechavičius climbed the ranks of the interwar period Lithuanian Army from captain to lieutenant general.

He is best known for his actions during the Lithuanian Wars of Independence when the partisans he led fought against the Soviet invasion of northwest Lithuania, liberated Seda, Mažeikiai, and Telšiai, and later forced out the Bermontians. He is also known for organizing the 1926 Lithuanian coup d'état and creating and leading the Lithuanian Territorial Defense Force during the German occupation of Lithuania.

== Early life ==
Povilas Plechavičius was born on 1 February 1890, in the Bukančiai farmstead, in the Židikai eldership, Mažeikiai district, to the Lithuanian farmer Ignas Plechavičius. His mother was Lithuanian noblewoman Konstancija Bukontaitė. Povilas Plechavičius was baptized in the Church of the Holy Trinity in Pikeliai. According to a list of languages made by Plechavičius himself, in addition to his native Lithuanian mother tongue, he also knew the Latvian, Russian, Polish, and German languages, as well as some English and French. Plechavičius is also known to have spoken Samogitian.

Plechavičius graduated from a gymnasium in Moscow in 1908. Because Plechavičius was proud of his Samogitian background, he was disliked by the Russian teachers and thus suffered because of it. Later, he graduated from the Moscow Commercial Institute in 1911. Plechavičius then graduated from the Orenburg Cossack Yunker School on May 13, 1914.

== World War I ==
During World War I, he fought in the 5th Cavalry Regiment (part of the 5th Cavalry Division) of the Imperial Russian Army against the German Empire, Austria-Hungary, and the Ottoman Empire. During the war, he was wounded. The first time he was wounded was in the fights near Šiauliai. Some sources give the number of his wounds as three, but his biography claims that he was wounded as many as 29 times during the war. In one case, he was unconscious for three days after receiving an injury.

== Russian Revolution in 1917 ==
In October 1917, the Bolshevik coup began and the Russian army fell apart, including in the Caucasus where the Plechavičius brothers were involved in the campaign against the Ottoman army.

While in southern Russia during the Russian Revolution, Plechavičius also fought against the Bolsheviks (perhaps as part of the Volunteer Army). As soon as possible after Lithuania declared its independence, both brothers Povilas and Aleksandras left their regiments for Samogitia in early 1918. The Plechavičiai brothers used this opportunity to return home to Lithuania.

== Lithuanian Wars of Independence ==
=== 1918 ===
==== Summer ====
The situation in Lithuania in 1918 was chaotic due to the rampage of robbers as well as the requisitions and robberies by the Imperial German Army units. The robbers were mostly former Russian prisoners of war on their way to Russia, which included Bolsheviks, and local criminals. The robbers frequently engaged in brutality like beating people up, burning their soles, and even skinning people alive, thereafter burning them with all their homesteads. A lot of those robbers ran rampant in the vicinity of Seda, Pikeliai, Židikai and Skuodas.

The German Empire had already signed the Treaty of Brest-Litovsk with Soviet Russia on March 3, 1918, thus ending the hostilities on the Eastern Front between the Russian and German armies. Germany had also recognized Lithuanian independence on March 23, but negotiations were still ongoing about the form of governance. Regardless, the German soldiers remained in Lithuania, looting and requisitioning from it.

On July 25 1918, Povilas and Aleksandras returned to their farmstead, from where they had not heard for a long time while serving in the Russian army. In August, the two brothers organized a Gegužinė (Lithuanian version of May Day) in Juodeikėliai to celebrate the Act of Independence of Lithuania. It was a mass gathering of the region's locals, where patriotic speeches were made, Samogitian pipe orchestras played, people sang patriotic songs, and danced. The celebrations were held in a garden. Several local communists disturbed the celebrations by firing shots. Plechavičius chose a couple of men, told them to catch those communists, spank them and let them go, which the men succeeded in doing. The people calmed down and continued dancing. The May Day had a great significance for the local residents, as it strengthened their patriotism, united them and encouraged them to fight for freedom.

==== Autumn ====
In the autumn of 1918, Povilas Plechavičius went by train to Vilnius, where the Council of Lithuania, the provisional government of Lithuania, was already located. Because the Germans were still de facto occupying the country, the Council of Lithuania could not really do much even if it was functioning. The Council of Lithuania appointed Plechavičius as the Seda County Commander on November 15 and authorized him to organize the militia, military headquarters (komendantūra), self-defence units, and local administration in Samogitia, and to strengthen the Lithuanian state there in all ways. After receiving the wide-ranging mandate from the Lithuanian government, Plechavičius started an uncompromising fight against the Bolsheviks, whose foremost enemy he became. On November 23, Plechavičius volunteered to join the Lithuanian army.

In November 1918, encouraged by the Council of Lithuania, self-government structures began to form throughout Lithuania, such as parish, district, and county committees, militias, self-defence groups, military volunteers, and soon even town and district military headquarters began to be created. However, most of the government structures were unprotected and most of the militias lacked weapons.

==== Winter ====
The situation was worsened by the Soviet westward offensive of 1918–1919, when the Soviet Red Army was approaching Lithuania. Local Bolsheviks were emboldened by this and began creating Revolutionary committees, also known as Soviets. By the end of 1918, they had formed Soviets in Skuodas, Salantai, Ylakiai, Leckava, Tirkšliai, Viekšniai, Plungė, and Židikai. The Bolshevik Soviets tried to consolidate their power through murder, terror, and robbery, hoping to subjugate Lithuania to Soviet Russia.

When the Bolsheviks seized control of Seda in late 1918, the two veteran brothers Povilas and Aleksandras, supported by the local population, began to organize a local partisan unit. Plechavičius began organizing the partisans after first receiving weapons from the inhabitants and, later on, also from the German military units in Latvia. Plechavičius taught military drills to the partisans and the militiamen that joined them. They also had basic shooting practice. Their activity centred on Skuodas. Plechavičius was assigned military commander of Skuodas and its surroundings by the Council of Lithuania.

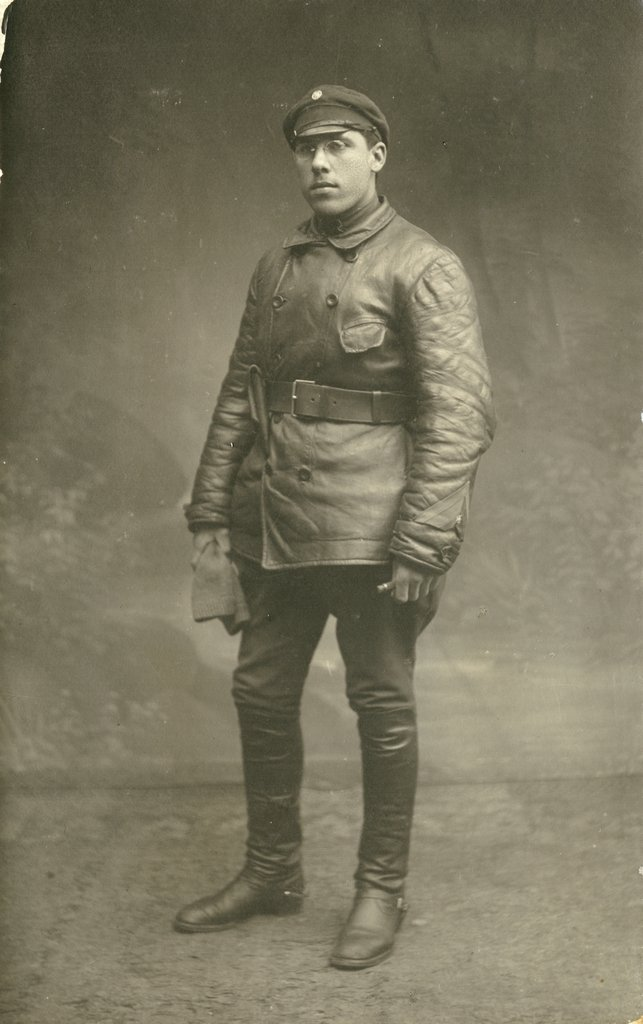
Povilas Plechavičius photographed in the front of the Lithuanian Wars of Independence, 1919

=== 1919 ===
Plechavičius' organizational talent, awareness of his responsibility and duty, combined with the public support for him and his fighters, soon gave tangible achievements. Together with his brother Aleksandras, Plechavičius succeeded in creating volunteer partisan units. On February 9, the partisans of Skuodas swore an oath and paraded through its streets on February 16, the day of the restoration of Lithuanian independence.

In the first half of 1919, the threat posed by Bolshevism to Lithuania was huge, because the Red Army had invaded up to the line along Mažeikiai, Seda, Telšiai, Šiluva, Kėdainiai, Jonava, Kaišiadorys, Alytus, and Merkinė. The Samogitian partisans stopped the Soviet invasions into Samogitia in the areas where there was no German military.

With the help of a German battalion and an artillery battery, the partisans liberated Seda and Mažeikiai by the end of February. The retreating Bolsheviks were being pursued until Kuršėnai, while in the north, they were followed in the direction of Laižuva and Žagarė until the Latvian border. Thus, in February 1919, Plechavičius was appointed the Commandant of Seda.

After reorganizing, the partisan headquarters moved to Seda. The nearby Telšiai received a military headquarters group for the town and its district from Kaunas. The commandant was the officer Bronius Zaleskis. Military headquarters were also established in Mažeikiai. The general situation throughout the war-torn lands was improving. The partisan self-defence squads had roughly 200 soldiers in them, while the local militia had a similar amount as well.

On February 27, the Samogitian partisans and German soldiers combined forces to liberate Luokė from the Bolsheviks. The Samogitian partisans were also involved in defeating the Soviet 30th Rifle Regiment near Tirkšliai and Mažeikiai on March 2.

The word about Plechavičius as a brave and fearless commander of Samogitian soldiers spread throughout the land and led to him being called the "ruler of Samogitia". Due to Plechavičius' efforts, order was established throughout the Samogitian region.

On May 31, 1919, Plechavičius married Irena Grinbergaitė (1897–1983) in Aleksandrija's Catholic church. According to Rapolas Skipitis, she was of Baltic German descent and from Liepāja.

==== Bolshevik assassination attempts ====
Bolsheviks tried assassinating Plechavičius numerous times, but always failed. For example, once Plechavičius was riding a bike near Seda. Someone shot at him and the bullet made a hole in Plechavičius' hat, but Plechavičius was unscathed. Plechavičius guarded that hat as a souvenir. Another time, in the Ylakiai district, while riding in a carriage from Kivyliai to Klauseikiai, someone threw a grenade into his carriage, but Plechavičius grabbed it and threw it away, with the grenade exploding and not harming anyone.

The Bolsheviks tried to murder Plechavičius in his bed while sleeping, by shooting through the wall, but this failed because the assassin missed. The Bolsheviks infiltrated a maid in Plechavičius' house, who was supposed to kill Plechavičius. Wherever Plechavičius and his partisans went, they encountered resistance, which led them to suspect the maid of being an informant. Feliksas Veitas discovered that the maid was a Bolshevik agent. The maid was arrested, sentenced to death by a court-martial, and publicly shot in the middle of the town of Seda, for everyone to see.

After eliminating the danger of Bolshevism in Samogitia, a court case was fabricated against Plechavičius, allegedly for fighting his enemies too brutally. The Social Democrat Liuda Purėnienė, a member of the Seimas, supported the accusation in court. When the floor was given to the accused, Plechavičius laconically stated: "Respected Court, if I had not been there at that time or another similar person, you would not be sitting here today." Plechavičius was acquitted.

In November 1919, Plechavičius was appointed the Commandant of Mažeikiai town and district.

=== 1920 ===
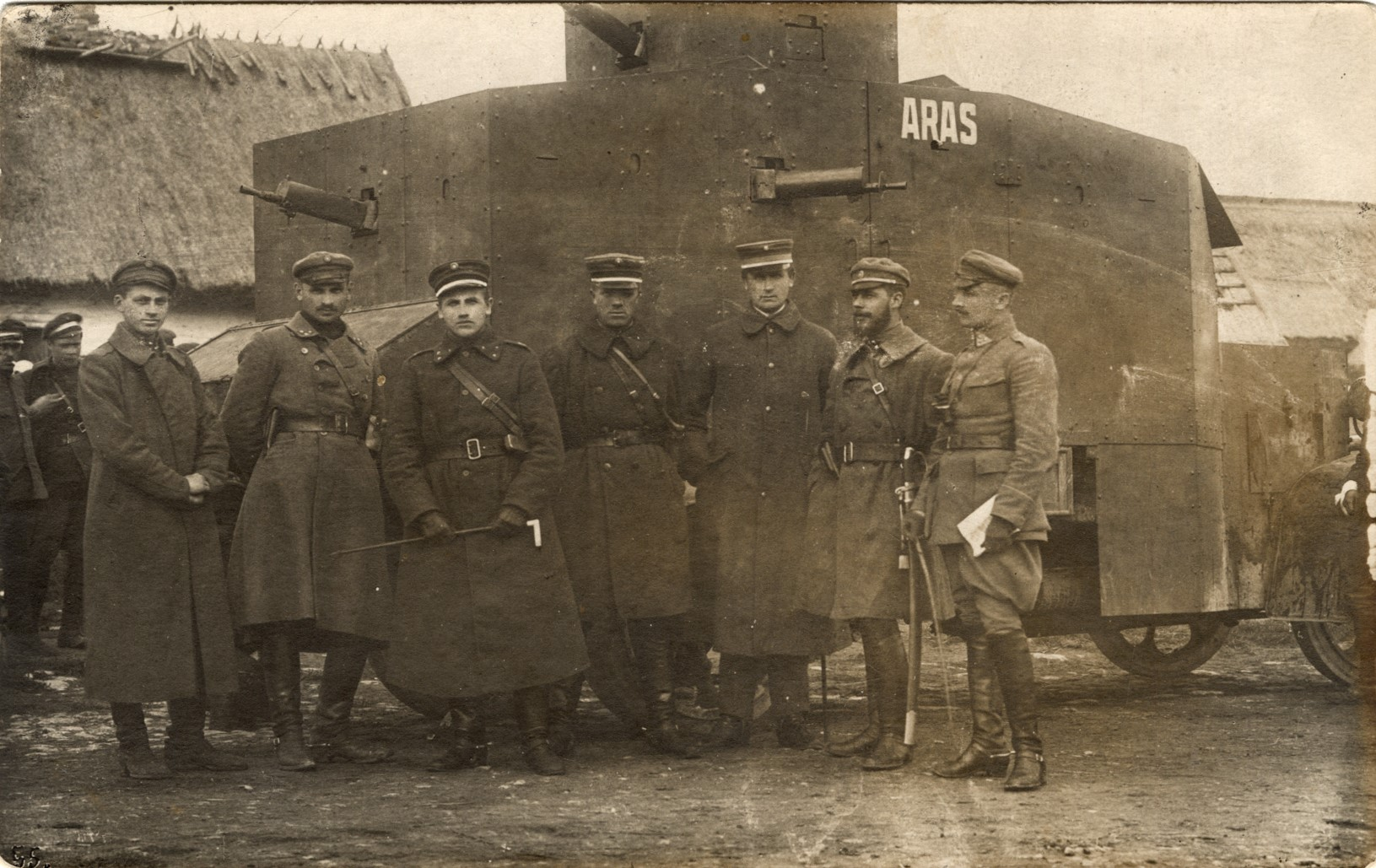
Plechavičius with other Lithuanian officers at the Seinai front in 1920

From January 1920, Plechavičius commanded a company and then a battalion of the 5th Infantry Regiment. As an officer in the Lithuanian Army, he participated in the Polish–Lithuanian War in the battle for Seinai, Augustavas, and Varėna in late 1920. At the end of 1920, he served in the 1st and 2nd Cavalry Regiments.

== Interwar ==
From May 1921, Plechavičius was the acting commander of the 1st Cavalry Regiment. From March 1922, Plechavičius was the colonel commanding the 1st Cavalry Regiment. His regiment was renamed to the 1st Hussar Regiment in April 1922. In 1924, Plechavičius graduated from the Higher Officers' Courses in Kaunas, in which he later taught himself. In 1926, Plechavičius graduated from the War College in Prague.

=== 1926 Lithuanian coup d'état ===
After the Lithuanian parliamentary election in May 1926, the political regime in Lithuania softened and the communist movement became stronger. Convinced that it was necessary to protect Lithuania from a Bolshevik coup, Plechavičius, who was freed from prison, where he was serving a 20-day sentence for a fistfight with another officer, became one of the leaders of the military coup of December 17, 1926. The coup removed the democratically elected government, assumed power and then handed it to Antanas Smetona.

=== Smetona period ===
On January 1, 1927, he was appointed Chief Cavalry Inspector of the Army Headquarters, and at the same time held the position of Chief of the General Staff Board. In July 1927, he was appointed Chief of Cavalry. From August 1927, Plechavičius was the Chief of the General Staff of the Army. He wrote a textbook in 1928 called the Jojų tarnyba, divizijos eskadronas ir mišri žvalgomoji rinktinė (Cavalry service, Divisional Squadron and Mixed Reconnaissance Team). He was given the rank of lieutenant general in 1929. On February 13, 1929, Plechavičius was released to the reserve against his will. He lived as a farmer thereafter.

The Tiškevičiai noble family deeply respected Plechavičius. One of their family members, Kazys Tiškevičius was a Senior Lieutenant in the 1st Hussar Regiment and also a member of the Lithuanian Riflemen's Union.

== World War II ==
After the Soviet occupation of Lithuania, Plechavičius withdrew to Germany in June 1940. He returned to Lithuania in June 1941 after Operation Barbarossa began, which was the start of the Eastern Front.

=== Lithuanian Territorial Defense Force ===
A Waffen-SS unit was never created in Lithuania due to a mass national boycott in 1943 by the Lithuanian anti-Nazi resistance. After German defeats on the Eastern Front and the Red Army approaching Lithuania, the German occupiers of Lithuania were more willing to accept Lithuanian demands for their own military units compared to before. Following protracted Lithuanian-German talks, Plechavičius agreed to form local Lithuanian military units called the Lithuanian Territorial Defense Force (Lithuanian: Lietuvos Vietinė Rinktinė) in February 1944. Seeing the Germans weakening, the Lithuanian anti-Nazi resistance supported the creation of the LTDF because it would be a way to arm Lithuanians for their self-defence. The LTDF was a volunteer military unit led only by Lithuanian officers and was supposed to stay within the borders of Lithuania to defend the country against the Red Army. Plechavičius became commander of the LTDF.

The subject of the LTDF generates controversy between Lithuanian and Polish historians due to their incompatible views on its actions in the Vilnius Region in 1944. While Polish historians claim that the LTDF's soldiers terrorized the local Polish-speaking population and fought only against the Polish Home Army (AK), Lithuanian historians point out that the AK also committed atrocities against Lithuanian civilians. In addition, while the Lithuanian side views eastern Lithuania as lands which Lithuanian military units had the right to defend, the Polish side thought it was rightfully their territory.

On Lithuanian Independence Day (February 16, 1944) Plechavičius made a radio appeal to the nation for volunteers. Some 19,500 men responded to the appeal. All Lithuanian political underground organizations supported Plechavičius. This was achieved through constant communication between Lithuanian commanders and resistance leaders. This was enormously successful; more volunteers came forward than was expected. The Germans were very surprised and deeply shocked by the number of volunteers since their own appeals went unheeded.

On March 22, 1944, SS Obergruppenführer and police general Friedrich Jeckeln called for 70–80,000 men for the Wehrmacht as Hiwis. Chief-of-Staff of Army Group North Generalfeldmarschall Walter Model demanded 15 battalions of men to protect the German military airports. Plechavičius rejected their demand on April 5. General Commissioner of Lithuania Theodor Adrian von Renteln demanded workers for Germany proper. Other German officials also voiced their demands. Finally, on April 6, the Germans ordered Plechavičius to mobilize the country. Plechavičius responded that the mobilization could not take place until the formation of the detachment was complete.

After the failed offensive against Polish Home Army due to the pre–emptive Polish surprise attack, Jeckeln ordered the detachment units in Vilnius to revert to his direct authority. All other units of the detachment were to come under the command of the regional German commissars. Furthermore, the detachment was to use the "Heil Hitler" greeting. Some soldiers of the LTDF committed crimes against civilian residents of the Vilnius region in April and May 1944. The most tragic incidents took place on May 4–6, in the villages of Pawłowo, Adamowszczyzna and Sienkowszczyzna, where a number of Lithuanian soldiers killed eleven people. They also beat or arrested many others, and also burned down dozens of farms and entire Adamowszczyzna.

In May 1944, the occupying Germans unsuccessfully tried to force the Lithuanian military units into the SS. The Lithuanian headquarters directed the Lithuanian units in the field to obey only the orders of the Lithuanian officers. It also ordered the LTDF Officers' School in Marijampolė to send the cadets home. Plechavičius issued a declaration for his men to disband and disappear into the forests with their weapons and uniforms. The majority of these soldiers became part of the underground resistance and formed the core of the armed anti-Soviet resistance in Lithuania for the next eight years. Instead of collaborating with the Germans, the Lithuanian units disbanded and Plechavičius and his staff were arrested by the Germans on May 15. Plechavičius and 52 other officers were deported to the Salaspils concentration camp in Latvia. Then he was taken to Gdańsk, then to Klaipėda. Plechavičius was released but remained under the supervision of the Gestapo. As the Soviet Red Army approached, Plechavičius left for Germany.

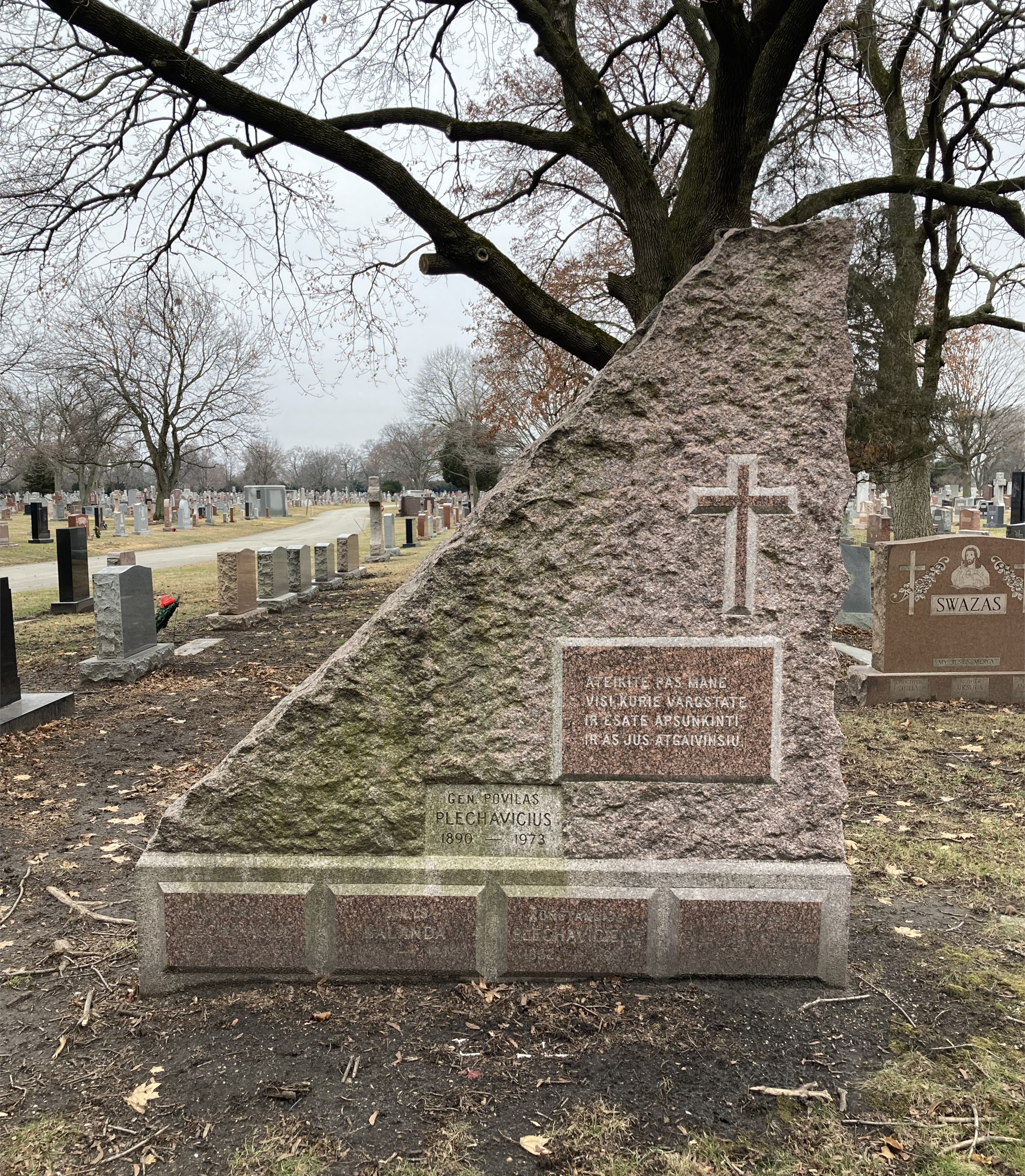
Plechavičius' grave at Saint Casimir Catholic Cemetery

== After World War II ==
In 1946, the NKVD demanded the extradition of Plechavičius from the British Zone of Occupation and accused him of being a "war criminal", "former Nazi-collaborator" and leading "the recruitment and deployment of paramilitary units which were involved in numerous actions against Jews and Soviet partisans". The British Foreign Office dismissed this, stonewalling the Soviet demands, and said that there were "vital intelligence reasons which preclude the possibility of our handing him over to the Russians."

Although Plechavičius worked with MI6 for some time, he later opted to better work with the Central Intelligence Agency. The CIA helped Plechavičius with his emigration to the United States in 1949, where his sister and mother lived. He was the chairman of the Board of the Lithuanian Military Veterans' Union Ramovė in 1950–1959.

He died in Chicago on December 19, 1973, and was buried at Saint Casimir Catholic Cemetery. He had three children, who were daughter Irena and sons Povilas and Norbertas, and three grandchildren.

Plechavičius had five brothers and six sisters. Two of the sisters died young, two of the brothers, including Aleksandras, died in forced exile in Siberia, while the rest, including Povilas, ended up in the United States.

== Awards ==
- Order of Vytis Cross, 5th Class in 1923
- Order of the Lithuanian Grand Duke Gediminas, 2nd Class in 1928

For his accomplishments in the Lithuanian Wars of Independence in defending Lithuania from invaders, Plechavičius was posthumously awarded the highest military Order of Lithuania - the Grand Cross of the Order of the Cross of Vytis - in 2004.

== Commemoration ==
There are many monuments and streets dedicated to Plechavičius across Lithuania. On 13 December 1991, the Automobilistai street in the Eiguliai eldership of Kaunas was renamed in Plechavičius' honour. Still, in Vilnius, the city councillors from the Electoral Action of Poles in Lithuania blocked the naming of one of its streets after Plechavičius in 1998.

On the occasion of March 11, the day of the Act of the Re-Establishment of the State of Lithuania in 1990, a bust of Povilas Plechavičius, sculpted by Merūnas Varnauskas, was ceremoniously unveiled there, which was later handed over to the Marijampolė Museum. A new bust of the general was created and donated by former LTDF volunteer sculptor Konstantinas Bogdanas. In 2001, a room-museum for Povilas Plechavičius was established in the Kaunas Garrison Officers' Club Building by the Soldiers' Union of the Lithuanian Territorial Defence Force (LVRKS).

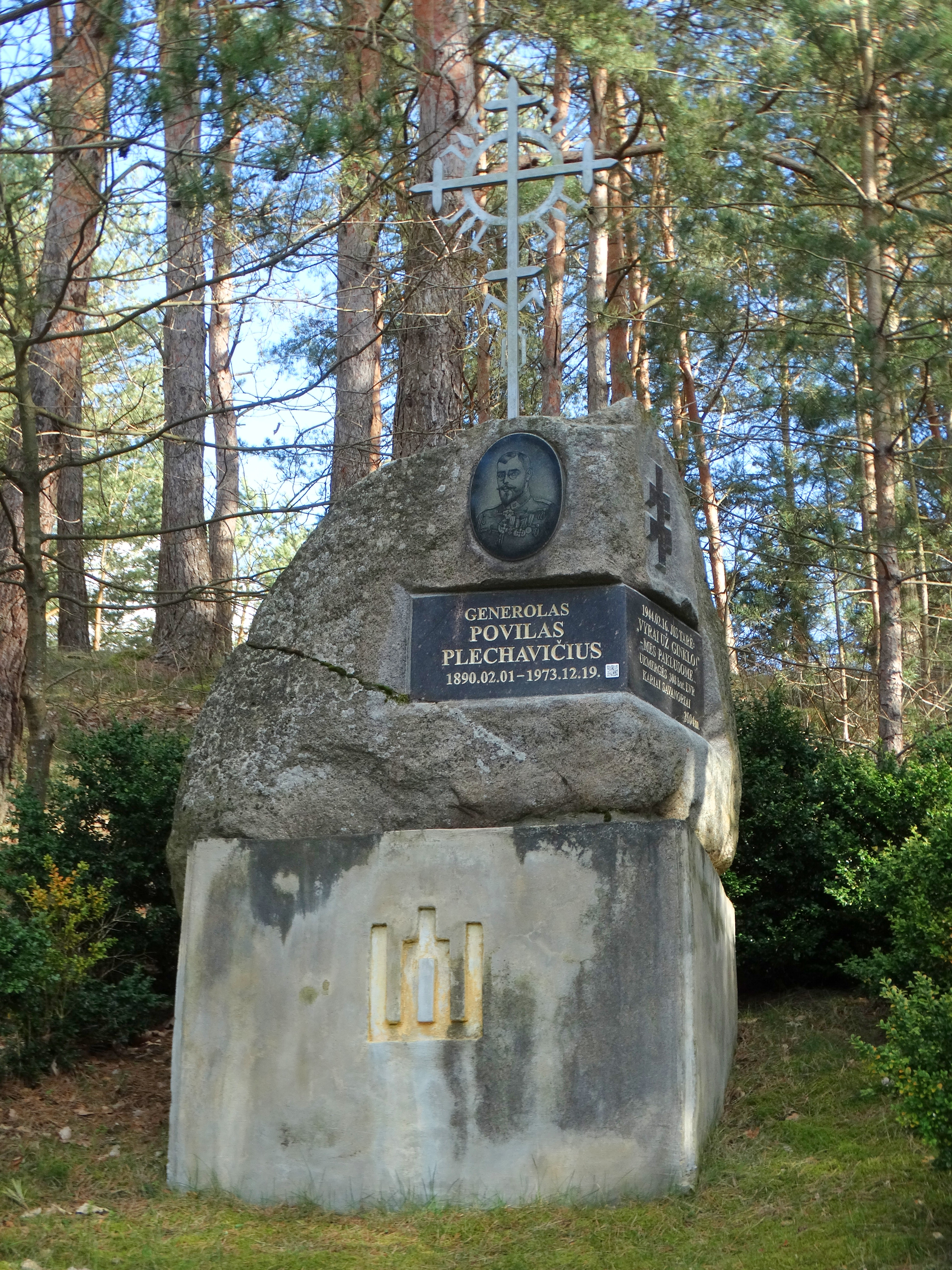
Memorial stone in Kadrėnai

Povilas Plechavičius was awarded the Grand Cross of the Order of the Cross of Vytisposthumously by Lithuanian President Rolandas Paksas in 2004. According to the Polish sociologist Adam Bobryk, this sparked protests among Poles in Lithuania and concern in Poland. However, Waldemar Tomaszewski, the leader of the Electoral Action of Poles, said in 2008 that "I personally look at these things in a Christian way" and that "he [Plechavičius] had many supporters and must be honored."

In 2006, a memorial stone for Plechavičius was unveiled in the memorial park created by Alfonsas Svarinskas in Kadrėnai. On 15 June 2008, a memorial rock was unveiled at the birthplace of the Plechavičiai family in Bukančiai and as many as 300 people came to the ceremony.

On 4 October 2008, due to the initiative and funds of the LVRKS, a monumental bust of Plechavičius was unveiled in the memorial park of Vytautas the Great War Museum (sculptor Juozas Šlivinskas, architect Kęstutis Linkus). This bust cost 70,000 Lithuanian litas. Among others, the unveiling ceremony of the bust was attended by Minister of National Defence Juozas Olekas and Kaunas Mayor Andrius Kupčinskas.

In 2009, the young soldier's school in Kaunas was named after General Povilas Plechavičius. In 2012, a square in Panevėžys was named in Plechavičius' honour. In 2020, 6,600 trees were planted in the Kaunas district in memory of Povilas Plechavičius. On August 27, 2022, in Stoties street, Mažeikiai, a memorial plaque, consecrated by priest Donatas Stulpinas of the Church of the Sacred Heart of Jesus in Mažeikiai, was unveiled on the wall of the former commandant's office building, where Povilas Plechavičius worked when commanding the local military headquarters.

On 15 August 2023, memorial plaques commemorating Aleksandras and Povilas Plechavičius, consecrated by Remigijus Monstvilas, senior chaplain of the Military Ordinariate of Lithuania, were unveiled in Palanga in the presence of the retired general Arvydas Pocius.

== Bibliography ==
=== Articles ===
- Blaževičius, Kazys (January 21, 2004). "Žemaitijos valdovas". XXI amžius (in Lithuanian). Vol. 6, no. 1209.
- Čekutis, Ričardas; Žygelis, Dalius (February 6, 2006). ""Laisvės kryžkelės" (II) – Povilas Plechavičius ir Lietuvos vietinė rinktinė" (in Lithuanian).
- Mackevičius, Mečislovas (Winter 1986). "Lithuanian resistance to German mobilization attempts 1941-1944". Lituanus. 32 (4). Lituanus Foundation. ISSN 0024-5089.
- Šiaudinis, Valentas (March 30, 2019). "101-ieji Lietuvos nepriklausomybės atkūrimo metai" [101-year anniversary of the restoration of Lithuania's independence] (PDF). Voruta. 857 (3). ISSN 1392-0677.
- Zabielskas, Vytautas (September 20, 2006). "Atidengiamas paminklas gen. P. Plechavičiui". Lietuvos Respublikos Krašto Apsaugos Ministerija (in Lithuanian).
- Zabielskas, Vytautas (September 24, 2018). "Povilas Plechavičius". Universal Lithuanian Encyclopedia (in Lithuanian).

=== Books ===
- Bobryk, Adam (2013). Społeczne znaczenie funkcjonowania polskich ugrupowań politycznych w Republice Litewskiej 1989 - 2013 [Social significance of the functioning of Polish political groups in the Republic of Lithuania 1989 - 2013] (in Polish). Siedlce.
- Dorril, Stephen (2002). MI6: Inside the Covert World of Her Majesty's Secret Intelligence Service. Simon and Schuster. ISBN 9780743217781.
- Jurgėla, Petras (1978). Gen. Povilas Plechavičius (PDF) (in Lithuanian). Brooklyn, New York.
- Lane, Thomas (August 23, 2002). Lithuania: Stepping Westward. Taylor & Francis Group. ISBN 9780415267311.
- Lesčius, Vytautas (2004). Lietuvos kariuomenė nepriklausomybės kovose 1918–1920 (PDF). Vilnius: Vilnius University, General Jonas Žemaitis Military Academy of Lithuania. ISBN 9955-423-23-4.
- Ivinskis, Zenonas (1965). "4. Lithuania During the War: Resistance Against the Soviet and the Nazi Occupants". In Vardys, V. Stanley (ed.). Lithuania under the Soviets: Portrait of a Nation. New York, U.S.A.: Frederick A. Praeger Publishers. LCCN 65-14060.
- Kaszeta, Dan (2023). The Forest Brotherhood: Baltic Resistance Against the Nazis and Soviets. C. Hurst & Co. ISBN 9781787389397.
- Rokicki, Paweł (2015). Glinciszki i Dubinki. Zbrodnie wojenne na Wileńszczyźnie w połowie 1944 roku i ich konsekwencje we współczesnych relacjach polsko-litewskich [Glinciszki and Dubinki. War crimes in the Vilnius Region in mid-1944 and their consequences in contemporary Polish-Lithuanian relations] (PDF). Monografie (in Polish). Warsaw: Institute of National Remembrance. ISBN 978-83-8229-224-4.
- Rogers, Steven B. (2015). "Baltic States". In Zabecki, David T. (ed.). World War II in Europe: An Encyclopedia. Taylor & Francis. ISBN 9781135812423.
