= Aleksandras Plechavičius =

Lithuanian military officer

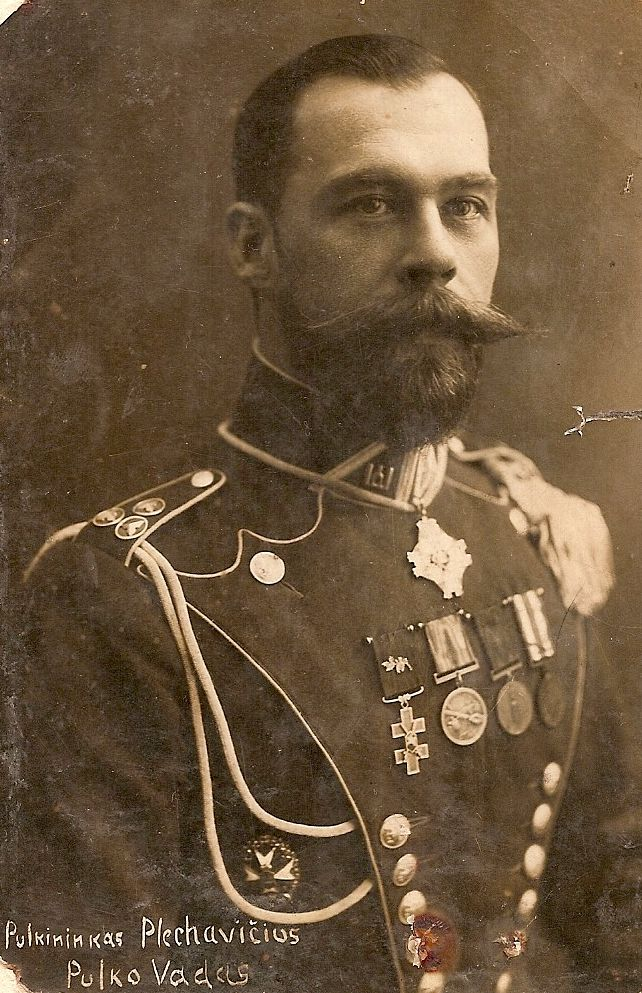
- Aleksandras Plechavičius as the Uhlan Regiment's commander
- Born: 1 June 1897; Bukančiai, Russian Empire
- Died: 6 May 1942 (aged 44) Petropavl, Kazakh SSR, Soviet Union
- Allegiance: Russian Imperial Army (1914–1918); Lithuanian Army (1918–1933)
- Service years: 1914–1933
- Rank: Colonel (pulkininkas)
- Commands: 2nd Uhlan Regiment
- Conflicts: World War I Lithuanian Wars of Independence
- Awards: Order of the Cross of Vytis (1927); Order of the Lithuanian Grand Duke Gediminas (1928); Order of Vytautas the Great (1933)

Aleksandras Plechavičius (1 June 1897 – 6 May 1942) was a Lithuanian military officer in the Imperial Russian Army and then the Lithuanian Army. In the service of Lithuania, he rose to the rank of colonel in the interwar period. He was a younger brother to the more famous Lithuanian military officer and later statesman Povilas Plechavičius.

== Early life ==
Aleksandras Plechavičius was born on 1 June 1897, in Bukančiai farmstead in the Židikai District to the Lithuanian farmer Ignas Plechavičius. His mother was the Lithuanian noblewoman Konstancija Bukontaitė. Aleksandras had ten siblings. He studied at the Mitau Gymnasium.

== Active military service ==
Aleksandras Plechavičius was mobilised to the Imperial Russian Army in 1914. Together with his elder brother Povilas, he completed the Cossack Cavalry School in Orenburg. While fighting against the Germans and the Ottomans, he was injured twice. In 1917, he was promoted to the commander of his cavalry squadron.

He returned from the front with his brother Povilas to Lithuania in July 1918. In November 1918, he enlisted as a volunteer in the Lithuanian Army. From December 1918 to February 1919 he actively participated in the fighting against the invading Bolsheviks with partisans in the areas of Seda, Telšiai and Akmenė. On 7 February 1919, he was designated the commander of the headquarter company (komendantūra) of Seda–Mažeikiai and was its commandant's deputy. A few months later, in July, he was the commandant of Utena and organised the headquarters of the district and town.

In December 1919, he became the 5th Infantry Regiment's commandant. In September and October 1920, he participated in fighting against the attacking Polish Army. After the fighting, in November 1920 he was transferred to the 2nd Uhlan Regiment. In December, he became the commander of a squadron and from July 1921, the deputy of the colonel. Then, in December 1921, he was the chairman of the regiment's court.

== Later life ==
He finished the Higher Officers' Courses in 1923. Three years later, he was the colonel of the 2nd Uhlan Regiment, and a year later, the commander. In 1929, he was sent to train with the Reichswehr. In 1933, he retired and became a farmer.

After the Soviet Union occupied Lithuania in June 1940, he was arrested by the NKVD on 13 July 1940. He was brutally interrogated in the prison of Raseiniai, and in July 1941 was deported to the Sol Iletsky in the Chkalov Oblast and in October to Petropavl. His younger brother Kazimieras (born in 1909) was deported together with him. Plechavičius died in prison in May 1942.

== Awards ==
He was awarded the following orders:

- Order of the Cross of Vytis, 5th class (1927)
- Order of the Lithuanian Grand Duke Gediminas, 3rd class (1928)
- Order of Vytautas the Great, 3rd class (1933)

== Memory ==
There is a statue dedicated to Aleksandras Plechavičius in the Kalniškiai village of the Stalgėnai eldership.
