= 3rd Infantry Division (Lithuania) =

- 3-oji pėstininkų divizija
- Active: 1920–1923; 1931–1940
- Country: Lithuania
- Branch: Lithuanian Army
- Engagements: Lithuanian Wars of Independence; Polish–Lithuanian War

The 3rd Infantry Division (Lithuanian: 3-oji pėstininkų divizija) was an infantry division of the Lithuanian Army. It was formed in 1920, during the Lithuanian Wars of Independence, and existed throughout the interwar until the Soviet occupation of Lithuania in 1940.

== History ==
On 10 February 1920, the three infantry brigades of the Lithuanian Army were reorganised into divisions, which were the 1st, 2nd and 3rd. Upon its creation, the 3rd Division had three infantry regiments and one independent battalion. In 1923–24, all the independent infantry battalions of the 2nd and 3rd Divisions were disbanded.

=== 1940 ===
As of 1940, the 3rd Infantry Division comprised headquarters, 3 infantry regiments and 1 artillery regiment, as well as the Military Commandant's Offices (Lithuanian: Karo komendantūra) for the districts of Kretinga, Mažeikiai, Šiauliai, Tauragė and Telšiai.

== Sources ==
- Surgailis, Gintautas (2024). Lietuvos kariuomenės istorija (PDF) (in Lithuanian). Vol. I (Part 1). Vilnius: Generolo Jono Žemaičio Lietuvos Karo Akademija. ISBN 978-609-8277-55-5.

=== Universal Lithuanian Encyclopedia ===
- Kisinas, Eugenijus Simonas (2018). "Divizija". Universal Lithuanian Encyclopedia (in Lithuanian).
- Spečiūnas, Vytautas; Knezys, Stasys; Gaidys, Arvydas (2018). "Lietuvos ginkluotosios pajėgos 1918–1940". Universal Lithuanian Encyclopedia (in Lithuanian).
