= Pikeliai =

- Town
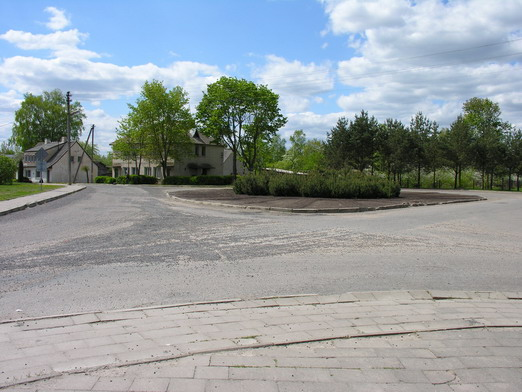

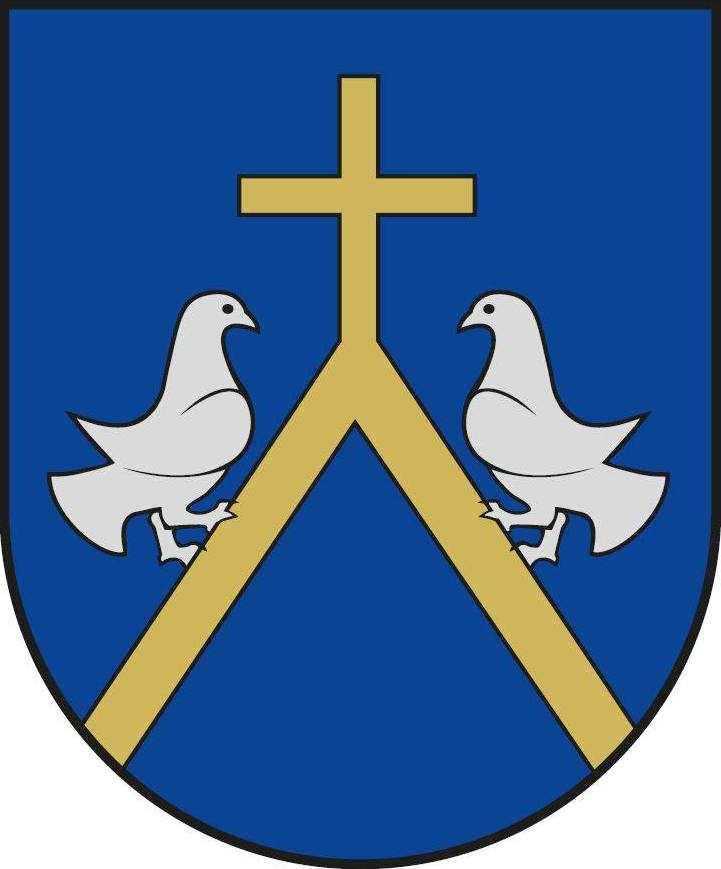
- Seal

- Location within Lithuania
- Coordinates: 56°25′1″N 22°6′40″E
- Country: Lithuania
- County: Telšiai County
- Municipality: Mažeikiai district municipality
- Eldership: Židikai eldership

Population (2011)
  - Total: 378
- Time zone: UTC+2 (EET)
  - Summer (DST): UTC+3 (EEST)

Pikeliai (Polish: Pikiele, Yiddish: Pikeln) is a town in Telšiai County, Lithuania. According to the 2011 census, the town has a population of 378 people. Pikeliai is named after the nearby "Pikelhof" estate.

== History ==
Pikeliai was first mentioned in 1594 in the Books of the Courts of Samogitian land. In 1598 it had 19 valakas (unit of measure in the Grand Duchy of Lithuania; 1 valakas is equal to 21 ha).

In 1625 Protestant Bilevičius demolished Catholic church in Pikeliai but it was rebuilt in 1636. The new church was built in 1752.

The first parish school of Pikeliai is mentioned in 1805. In 1865 it was reorganized to public primary school.

In 1897 a total of 1206 Jewish people made up 68% of the population in Pikeliai. By 1921 the increasingly hostile situation had brought the Jewish population down to 286 people.

Between 3 and 9 August 1941, all the Jewish families that had not fled Pikeliai were taken out of town and killed by the Nazis and their Lithuanian collaborators.

Nowadays Pikeliai has Catholic church, high school, medical office, public library, post office etc.
