= 2nd Uhlan Regiment (Lithuania) =

2nd Uhlan Regiment of the Lithuanian Grand Duchess Birutė
- 2-asis ulonų Didžiosios Lietuvos Kunigaikštienės Birutės pulkas
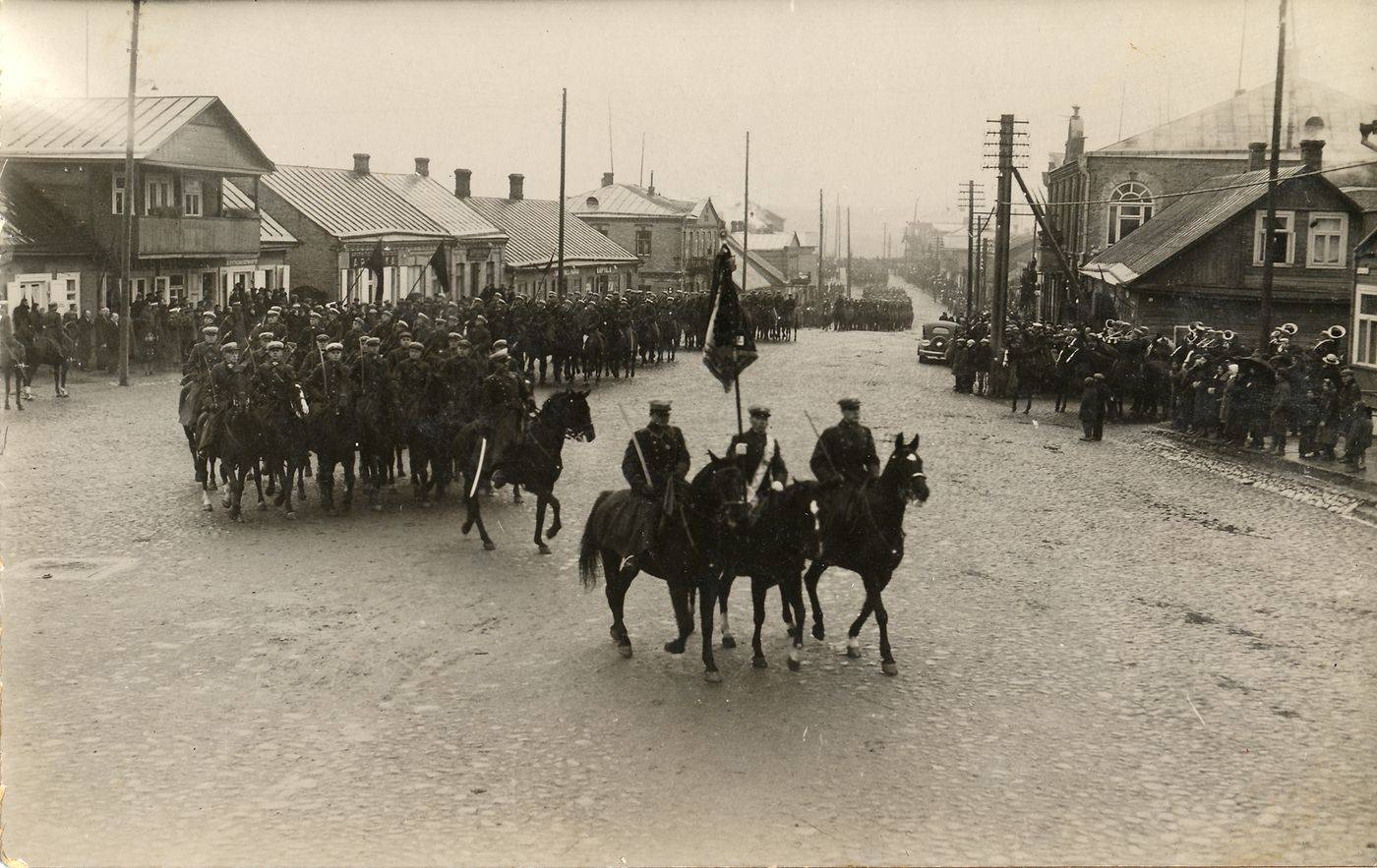
- The Uhlan regiment's parade in Alytus' Vilnius Street in 1936
- Active: October 30, 1920 – October 26, 1940
- Country: Lithuania
- Branch: Lithuanian Army
- Type: Cavalry, later Uhlan
- Garrison/HQ: Kaunas & Vilkaviškis (1920-1926); Alytus (1926-1940)
- Patron: Lithuanian Grand Duchess Birutė

The 2nd Uhlan Regiment (Lithuanian: 2-asis ulonų pulkas), from 1928 known as the 2nd Uhlan Regiment of the Lithuanian Grand Duchess Birutė (Lithuanian: 2-asis ulonų Didžiosios Lietuvos Kunigaikštienės Birutės pulkas) was founded on 30 October 1920. Its first commander was Colonel Pranas Jackevičius. The regiment had four cavalry, one machine gun and one technical squadrons. The regiment was disbanded on 26 October 1940.

== Names ==
From its formation to 3 February 1922, the regiment was known as the 2nd Cavalrymen Regiment (Lithuanian: 2-asis raitelių pulkas). For a month, from 3 February to March 31, it was the 2nd Cavalry Regiment (Lithuanian: 2-asis kavalerijos pulkas). From 1 April 1922 to 29 September 1928, the regiment was known as the 2nd Uhlan Regiment (Lithuanian: 2-asis ulonų pulkas). From 30 September 1928 to 24 July 1940, the regiment was titled as the 2nd Uhlan Regiment of the Lithuanian Grand Duchess Birutė (Lithuanian: 2-asis ulonų Lietuvos Didžiosios kunigaikštienės Birutės pulkas). Following Soviet occupation of Lithuania in 1940, the regiment's title was changed to 2nd Uhlan Regiment on 25 July, which it retained until its disbandment in late October 1940.

== Formation in 1920 ==
The regiment's first order was given on November 16. On November 17, the 2nd squadron began to be formed. The 1st, 3rd and 4th were formed in December.

== 1921 ==
By 1 January 1921, the regiment had 534 officers and soldiers. On April 24, the regiment left for Utena. There, on April 30, it took over from the 5th Infantry Regiment the guarding of the Foch Line at the sector from Giedraičiai to the Latvian border. Besides small skirmishes with the Poles, Polish soldiers in civilian disguise attacked the local field guard at Lokajus and stole 4 horses and 3 carbines on July 18. On October 22, the regiment was transferred to Kaunas.

== Interwar ==
Then on 2 November 1922, the regiment moved to Vilkaviškis. Thereafter, to Alytus on 30 March 1926. On 30 September 1928, the regiment was named 2nd Uhlan Regiment of the Lithuanian Grand Duchess Birutė and received the flag, with the inscription "Garbingi bočių žygiai tebūna mums gyvenimo rodyklė" (translated to "May the honorable marches of our ancestors be an example for us to follow for life"). In 1939, the regiment was among those units of the Lithuanian Army which entered Vilnius. The Uhlan regiment was disbanded by the occupying Soviet Union.

== Regimental commanders ==
The regiment was commanded by:

- Colonel Pranas Jackevičius
- Colonel Aleksandras Plechavičius
- Colonel Antanas Rėklaitis
- Colonel Kazys Labutis
- Colonel Izidorius Kraunaitis
- Colonel Povilas Žilys
- Colonel Kazys Gudelis

== Sources ==
- Steponaitis (1933). "Antras ulonų D. L K. Birutės pulkas". In Vaclovas Biržiška (ed.). Lietuviškoji enciklopedija (in Lithuanian). Vol. I: A - Atskalūnas. Kaunas: Spaudos Fondas. pp. 784–785.
- Vydrina, Elena (2009). "lcva fondo 525 pažyma". www.archyvai.lt (in Lithuanian).
- Ruzgas, V., ed. (1932). Visa Lietuva (in Lithuanian). Kaunas: Spaudos Fondas.
- MELC (2022). "Ulonų pulkas". Visuotinė lietuvių enciklopedija (in Lithuanian). Science and Encyclopaedia Publishing Centre.
