= Church of the Holy Trinity, Pikeliai =

Roman Catholic church in Pikeliai, Lithuania

Church of the Holy Trinity Švč. Trejybės bažnyčia
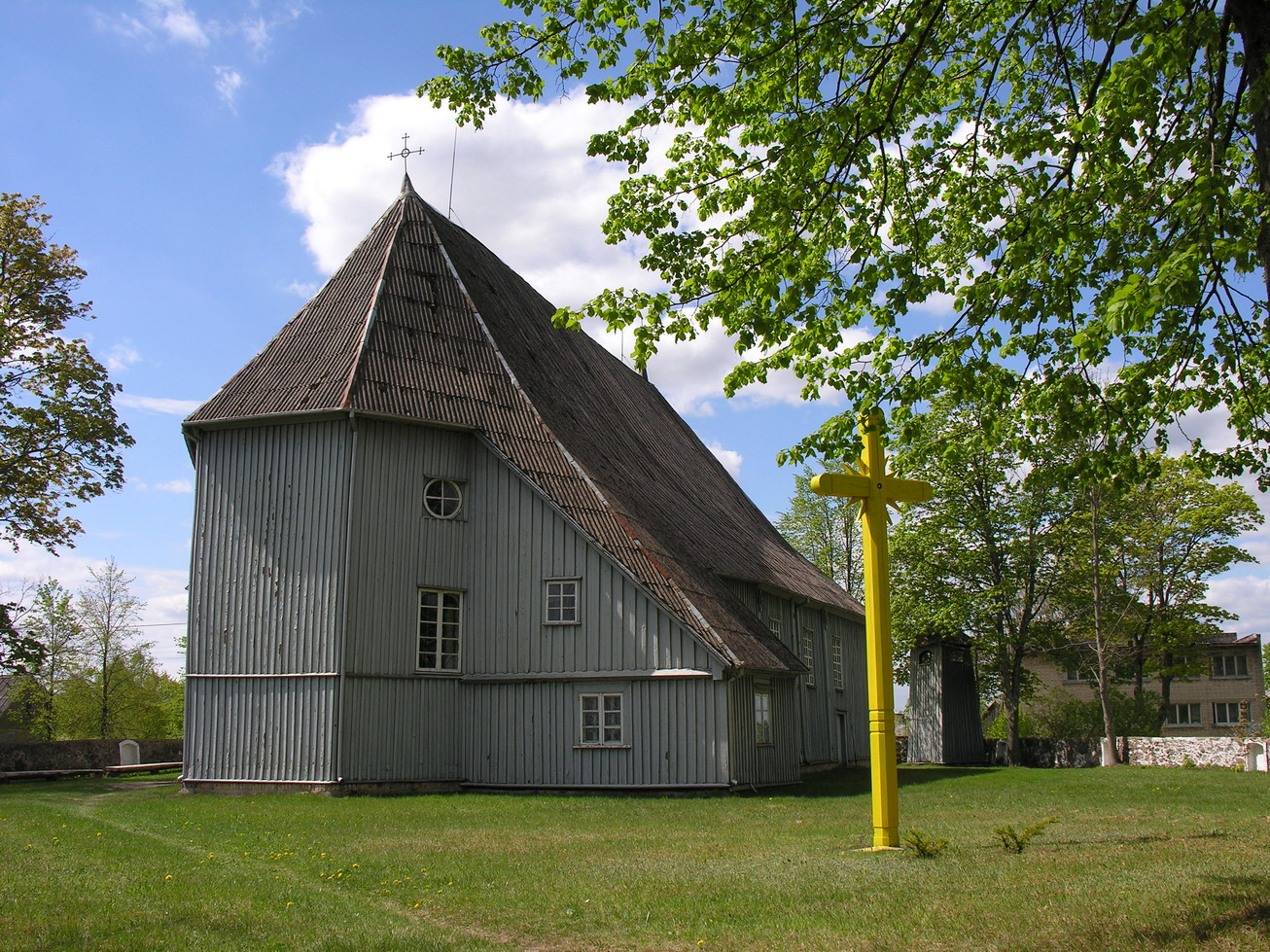

Religion
- Affiliation: Roman Catholic
- Diocese: Mažeikiai District Municipality
- Year consecrated: 1761

Location
- Location: Tvenkinio g. 3, Pikeliai, Lithuania
- Interactive map of Church of the Holy Trinity; Švč. Trejybės bažnyčia
- Coordinates: 56°25′6″N 22°6′33″E

Architecture
- Type: Church
- Style: baroque, Lithuanian vernacular architecture
- Completed: 1752; 274 years ago

Specifications
- Direction of façade: West
- Materials: wood

The Church of the Holy Trinity (Lithuanian: Švč. Trejybės bažnyčia, Samogitian: Švt. Trejībės bažninčė) is a Roman Catholic church in Pikeliai, Lithuania. It is located close to Lithuania-Latvia border. Pikeliai' church is the oldest Roman Catholic church in Mažeikiai District Municipality.

== History ==
The first church was built prior to 1625 but according to sources, the church that was located in Pikeliai was destroyed in 1625 by a Protestant Melchioras Bilevičius who took the remains of the church to his manor in Griežė. However, the church was quickly rebuilt because it was mentioned in written sources again already in 1636.

Current wooden church was built in 1752 and consecrated by Bishop of Samogitia Antoni Dominik Tyszkiewicz (Lithuanian: Antanas Domininkas Tiškevičius) on 26 April 1761. It was renovated in 1880. During the Second World War, in 1944, the church suffered great losses because its tower was destroyed and its wooden belfry was burned.

Currently, the church is a filial of Mažeikiai parish of St. Francis of Assisi.

== Architecture ==
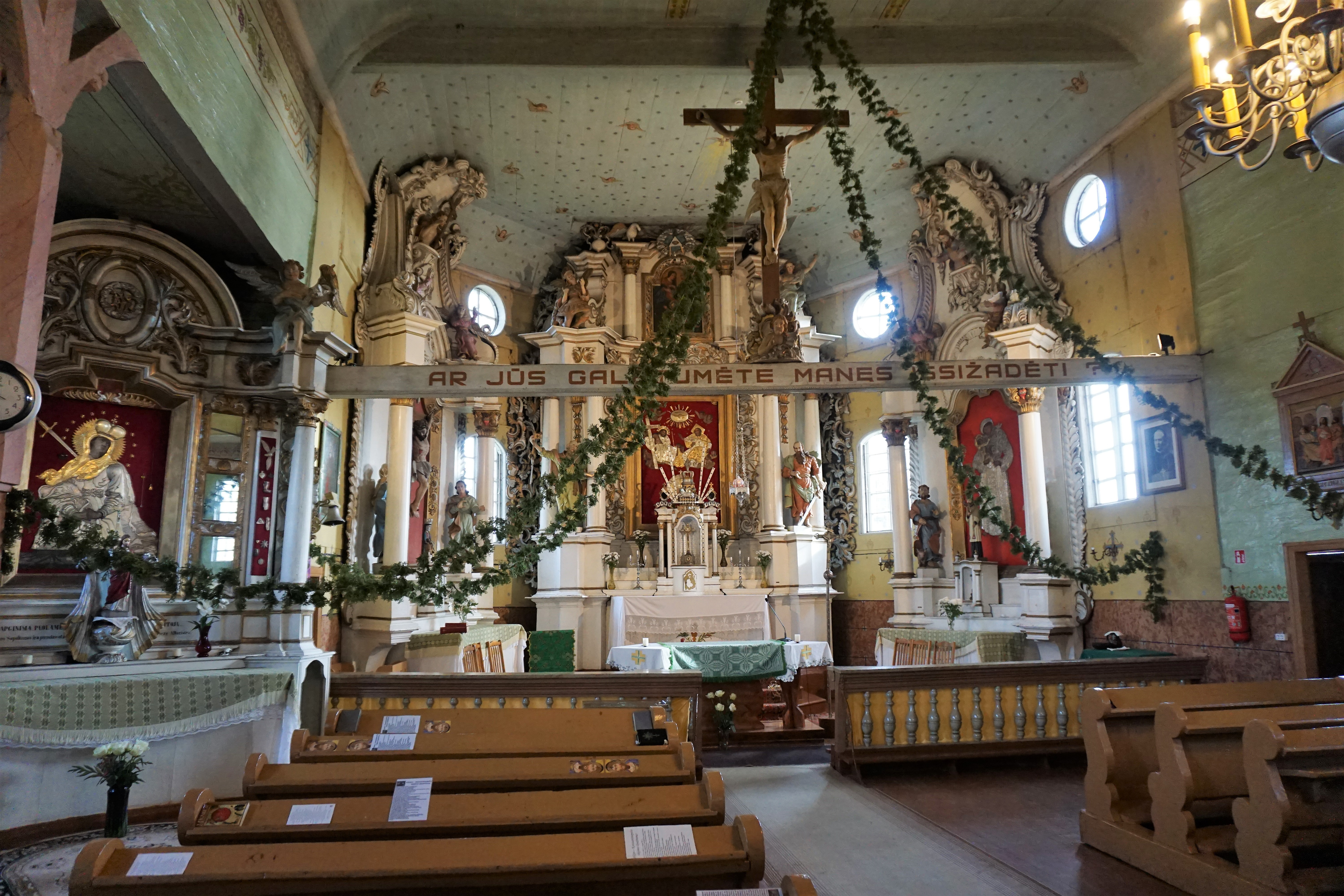
Interior of the church

The church is rectangle, without towers, with low ceiling and tall roof. There are 7 altars that reflect the styles of baroque and local vernacular architecture.

The church has three naves and a three-wall apse, seven ornate and colorful altars. The high altar was created c. 1752, the altar of St. Michael c. 1785. The plasticity of the wooden altars imitates stone architecture.

The interior architecture of the church was determined by those who supported the construction of it, i.e. Sapieha, Gadonas, Stirpeika families, treasurer of Grand Duchy of Lithuania Mykolas Važinskis. According to Dalius Stancikas, they were the ones whose support allowed to synchronize the unique Samogitian carving together with the European level works making this church one of the most beautiful wooden churches in Lithuania.

== Sources ==
- turizmogidas.lt
- mke.lt
