= 2nd Infantry Division (Lithuania) =

- 2-oji pėstininkų divizija
- Active: 1920–1923; 1931–1940
- Country: Lithuania
- Branch: Lithuanian Army
- Engagements: Lithuanian Wars of Independence; Polish–Lithuanian War

The 2nd Infantry Division (Lithuanian: 2-oji pėstininkų divizija) was an infantry division of the Lithuanian Army. It was formed in 1920, during the Lithuanian Wars of Independence, and existed throughout the interwar until the Soviet occupation of Lithuania in 1940.

== History ==
Following the restoration of the Lithuanian state in 1918, the Lithuanian Army was also re-established, comprising regiments which were merged into brigades in 1919 and then into divisions in early 1920. On 10 February 1920, the three infantry brigades of the Lithuanian Army were reorganised into divisions.

The 2nd Division had three infantry regiments and three independent battalions. In 1923–24, all the independent infantry battalions of the division were disbanded.

=== 1940 ===
As of 1940, the 2nd Infantry Division comprised headquarters, 3 infantry regiments and 1 artillery regiment, as well as the command posts for the districts of Kaunas, Alytus, Marijampolė, Seinai, Šakiai and Vilkaviškis.

== Sources ==
- Surgailis, Gintautas (2024). Lietuvos kariuomenės istorija (PDF) (in Lithuanian). Vol. I (Part 1). Vilnius: Generolo Jono Žemaičio Lietuvos Karo Akademija. ISBN 978-609-8277-55-5.

=== Universal Lithuanian Encyclopedia ===
- Kisinas, Eugenijus Simonas (2018). "Divizija". Universal Lithuanian Encyclopedia (in Lithuanian).
- Spečiūnas, Vytautas; Knezys, Stasys; Gaidys, Arvydas (2018). "Lietuvos ginkluotosios pajėgos 1918–1940". Universal Lithuanian Encyclopedia (in Lithuanian).
