= Lithuanian Wars of Independence =

Series of wars in Lithuania, 1918–1920

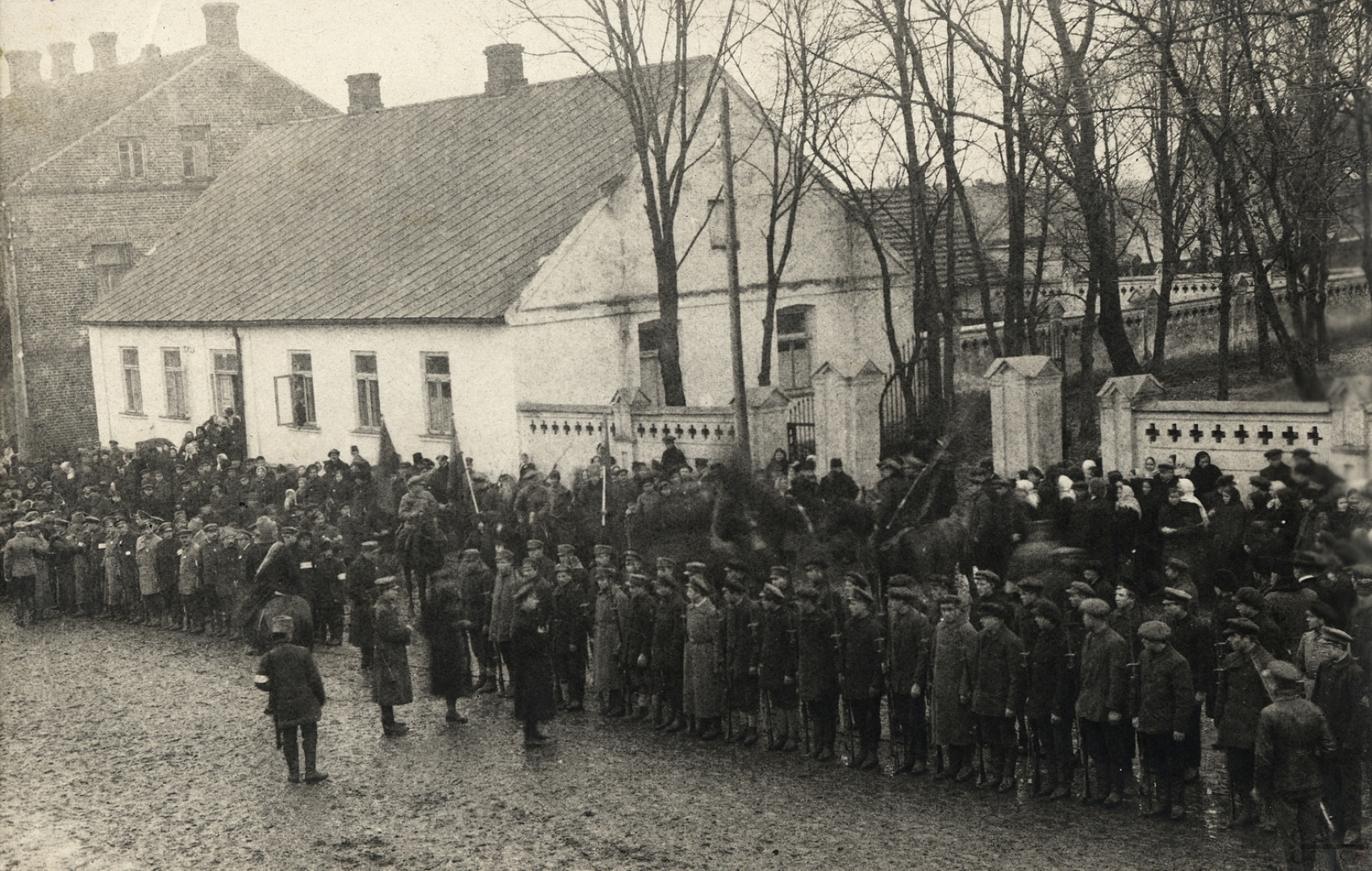
Volunteers of the Lithuanian Army heading to the war in Vilkaviškis, 1919

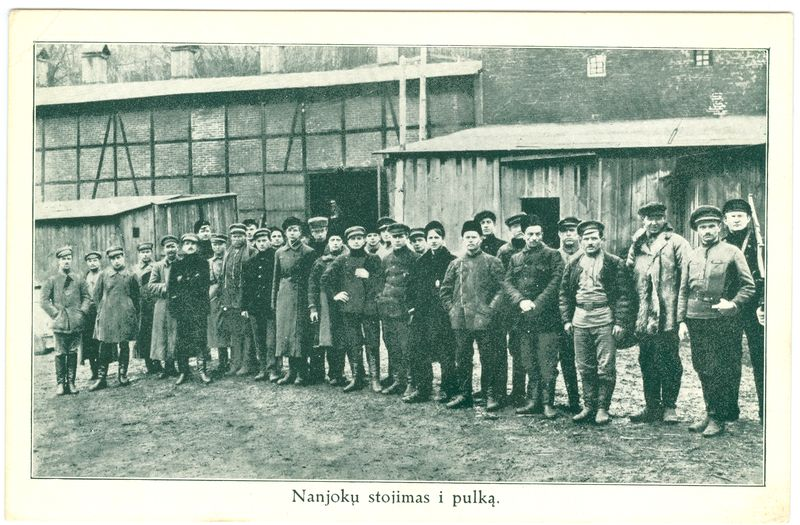
Enlistment in the Lithuanian Army, Panemunė, Kaunas, Lithuania, 1919

The Lithuanian Wars of Independence (Lithuanian: Lietuvos nepriklausomybės kovos), also known as the Freedom Struggles (Lithuanian: Laisvės kovos), refer to three wars Lithuania fought defending its independence at the end of World War I: with Bolshevik forces (December 1918 – August 1919), Bermontians (October 1919 – December 1919), and Poland (April 1919 – November 1920). The wars delayed international recognition of Lithuania's restored independence and the establishment of its civil institutions.

== Background ==
After the Partitions of the Polish–Lithuanian Commonwealth in 1795, the Grand Duchy of Lithuania was annexed by the Russian Empire. The Lithuanian National Revival emerged during the 19th century, and the movement to restore independent Lithuania on nation-state basis intensified during the early 20th century. During World War I, Lithuanian territory was occupied by Germany from 1915 until the war ended in November 1918.

On February 16, 1918, the Council of Lithuania declared the re-establishment of independence from all previous legal bonds with other states. The declaration asserted the right to self-determination, meaning the creation of a state within ethnic Lithuanian territories. The publication of the Act of Independence was initially suppressed by the German occupation forces. However, on March 23, 1918, the Germans acknowledged the declaration; their plans had shifted to the establishment of a network of satellite countries (Mitteleuropa). However, Germany did not allow the council to establish a Lithuanian military force, police force, or civic institutions. On November 11, 1918 Germany signed an armistice on the Western Front and officially lost the war and control over Lithuania. The first national government, led by Augustinas Voldemaras, was formed. Voldemaras issued a declaration that Lithuania did not need a military force, as it was not planning to engage in warfare, and that only a small militia was needed. This view was unrealistic, since military conflicts soon erupted.

== Formation of the army ==
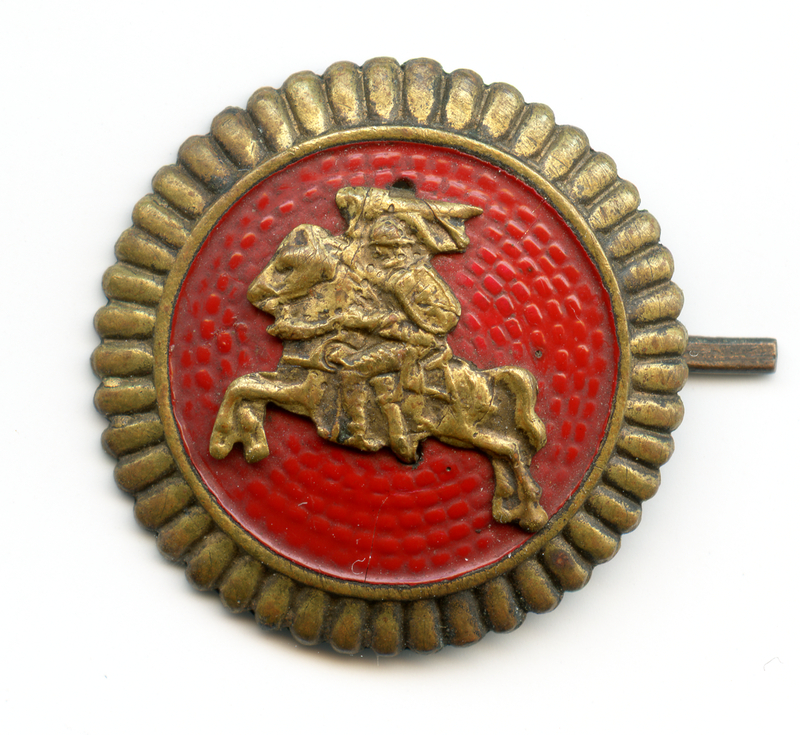
Cockade of the Lithuanian Army with Vytis

The first legislative act creating an army was passed on November 23, 1918. Its development and organization moved slowly due to a lack of funding, arms, ammunition, and experienced military commanders. On December 20, Antanas Smetona and Augustinas Voldemaras went to Germany to request assistance. This arrived at the end of 1918, when Germany paid the Lithuanian government one hundred million marks in reparations; the organization of the new Lithuanian army proceeded under the auspices of the German army, which was withdrawing in stages. However, the departure of both leaders created a difficult domestic situation. The Council of Lithuania released Voldemaras' cabinet; Mykolas Sleževičius became Prime Minister of Lithuania and formed a Cabinet on December 26, 1918. Perceiving an imminent threat to the state, he issued a proclamation several days later. Directed at Lithuanian men, the proclamation invited volunteers to join a force to defend the country.

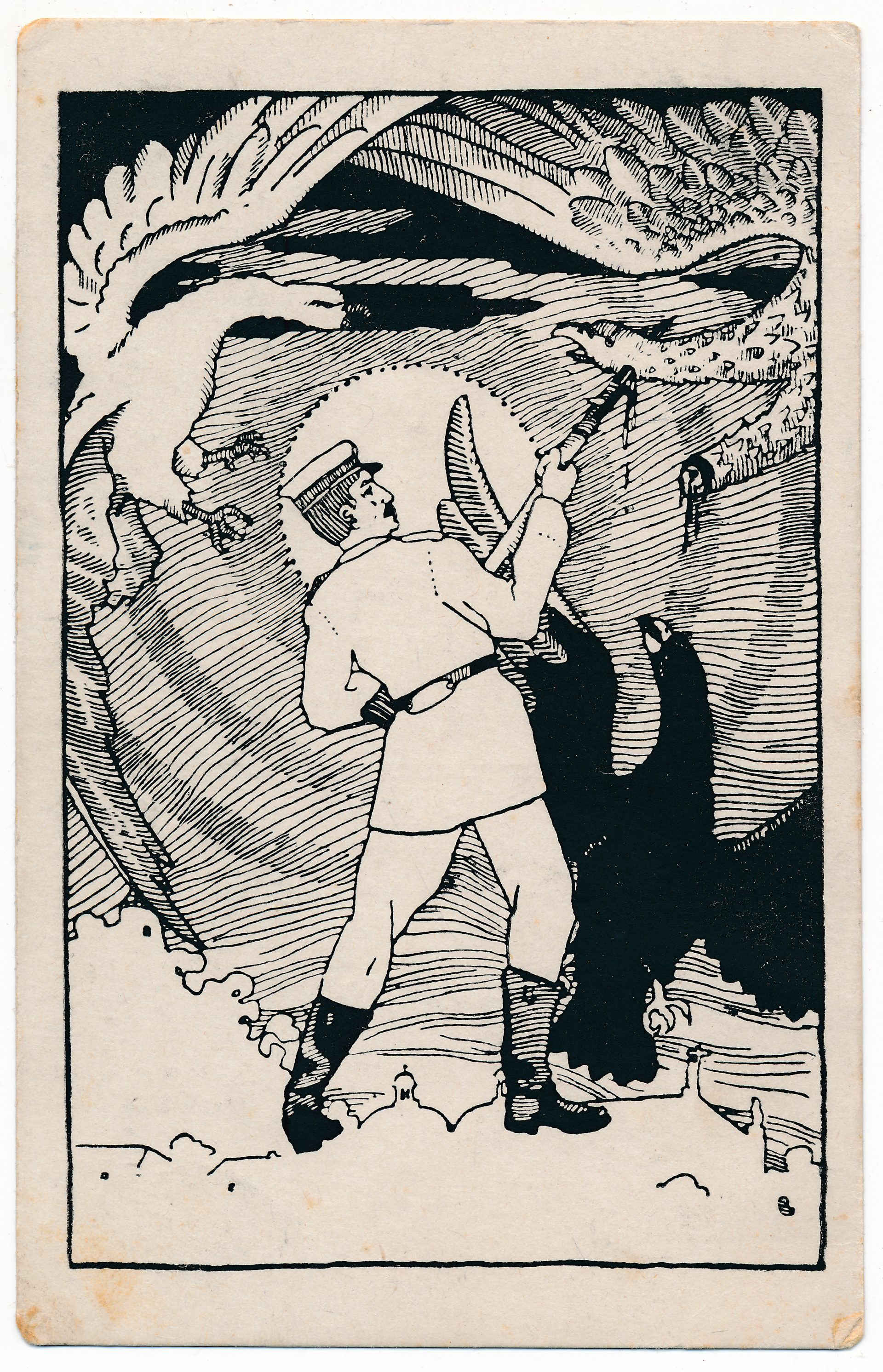
Allegory of Lithuania's fight against three eagles

Lithuanian volunteers who agreed to join the military force were promised free land. Fulfilling its Armistice obligation to support Lithuanian independence, Germany initially tried to organize a volunteer force from units remaining in Lithuanian territory, but those attempts failed. Crimps were sent to Germany to recruit volunteers. A division of volunteers was soon formed, who were paid 5 marks per day plus 30 marks per month. The first units began arriving in Lithuania during January 1919, although some of them were sent away because they were in poor condition. By the end of January, 400 volunteers were stationed in Alytus, Jonava, Kėdainiai, and Kaunas. They formed the basis for the 46th Saxonian division, renamed in March to the Southern Lithuanian Saxonian Volunteer Brigade. The brigade consisted of the 18th, 19th, and 20th regiments. The last of these German troops would leave Lithuania during July 1919.

Belarusians and Lithuanian Jews also participated as volunteers of the Lithuanian Army.

After successful attempts at mustering a voluntary force to defend Lithuanian territories, mobilization was begun on March 5, 1919, to expand the Lithuanian armed forces. It applied to men born between 1897 and 1899. At the end of summer 1919, the Lithuanian army numbered about 8,000 men. During the battles that followed, 1,700 Lithuanian volunteers died, more than 2,600 were injured, and 800 were missing in action. Historian Alfonsas Eidintas cites the total deaths as 1,444.

== War against the Bolsheviks ==
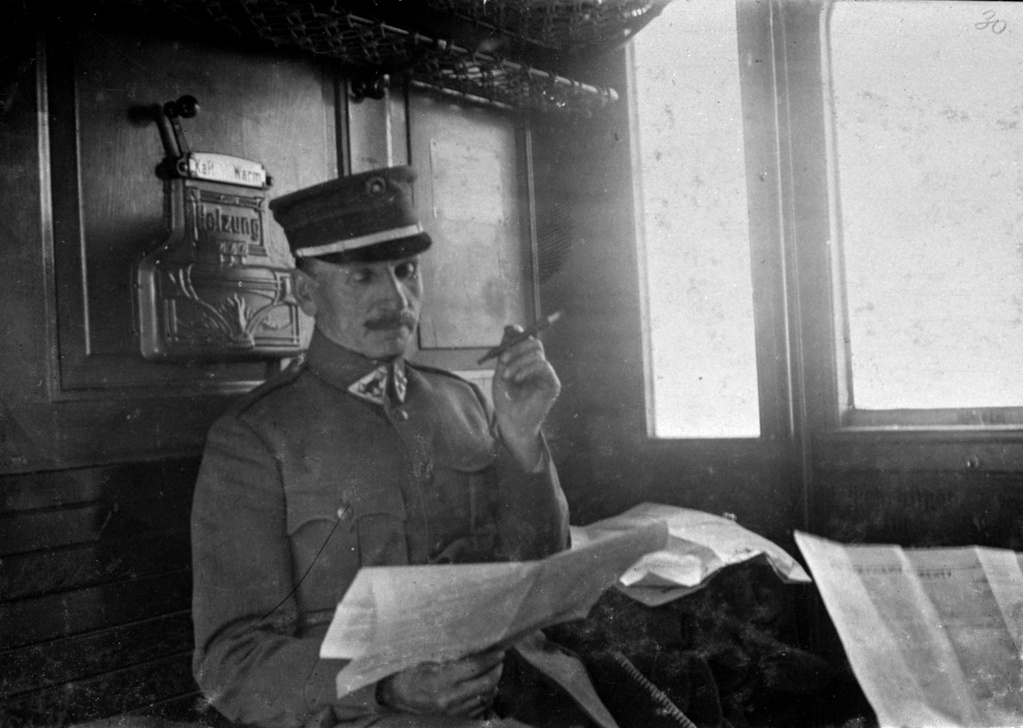
Chief Commander of the Lithuanian Army Silvestras Žukauskas heading to the front, 1919

Lithuanian–Soviet War
- Part of Lithuanian Wars of Independence and Soviet westward offensive of 1918–1919 of Russian Civil War
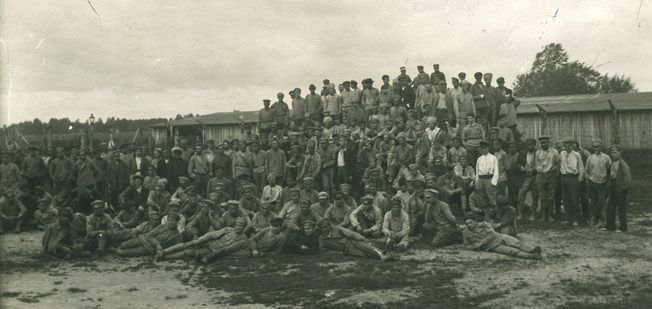
- Soviet prisoners of war in a Lithuanian camp. As of December 1, 1919, the Lithuanians held 1,773 Soviet prisoners.
Date	12 December 1918 – 31 August 1919 (8 months, 2 weeks and 5 days)
Location	Lithuania
Result	Lithuanian victory

Belligerents
Lithuania; Saxon Volunteers	Russian SFSR; Lithuanian-Byelorussian SSR

Commanders and leaders
Silvestras Žukauskas	Vincas Kapsukas

Strength
(Lithuania) 8,000 Lithuanians (August 1919) (Weimar Republic) 10,000 Germans	(Russian Soviet Federative Socialist Republic) 18,000–20,000

Advance of Bolshevik forces (red arrows). The red line shows the Bolshevik front in January 1919.

As revolution broke out in Germany, the German government withdrew support for the Treaty of Brest-Litovsk, which had ceded Lithuania's independence from Soviet Russia on November 5, 1918. Meanwhile, the Soviet Russian government renounced the treaty on November 13. The Bolsheviks attempted to conquer Lithuania from the east as part of their global proletarian revolution. Elsewhere, the treaty had also ceded independence to Armenia, Azerbaijan, and Georgia in the Near East, and Belarus and Ukraine in Eastern Europe. Soviet Russia attacked these nations as well. But whereas they did fall, Lithuania and Poland would not.

On December 8, 1918, a temporary revolutionary government in the capital city of Vilnius was formed, consisting solely of members of the Communist Party of Lithuania. Vincas Mickevičius-Kapsukas became its chairman. The following day, a workers' soviet was formed and declared that it had taken control of Vilnius. However, Voldemaras' government and a Polish committee also declared their control of the city at the same time. The Germans finally abandoned Vilnius on December 31, 1918. On January 5, 1919, the Red Army took it and advanced further in the west. Local Polish paramilitary platoons led by General Władysław Wejtko fought the Red Army in Vilnius for five days; the Lithuanian government had left Vilnius along with the regular German Army. On January 1, 1919, local communists in the town of Šiauliai, about 200 kilometers west of Vilnius, rebelled and created a 1,000-man Samogitian Regiment; when the Red Army entered the town on January 15, Soviet power already existed there. On January 18, the Soviets and Germans signed a treaty and designated a demarcation line that barred Bolshevik forces from directly attacking Kaunas, Lithuania's second-largest city. The Red Army would need to attack through Alytus or Kėdainiai.

German volunteers led by Rüdiger von der Goltz arrived in Lithuania, took up positions along the Hrodna–Kaišiadorys–Kaunas line, and helped the Lithuanian forces, commanded by Lieutenant Colonel Jonas Variakojis, to stop the Red Army advance near Kėdainiai. On February 8, during a reconnaissance mission, the first Lithuanian soldier to die in the wars, Povilas Lukšys, was killed near Taučiūnai. On February 10, the joint forces captured Šėta and forced the Red Army to retreat. The success of this operation lifted the Lithuanian army's morale. During the first half of February, the regiment of Saxon volunteers stationed between Kaišiadorys and Žiežmariai engaged in skirmishes on their line. The Germans joined in the latter part of the battle of Jieznas, which ultimately ended with a joint Lithuanian and German victory. After this setback, the Bolshevik 7th Riflemen Regiment began to disintegrate, and many soldiers deserted. The regiment could have been completely destroyed if the Germans had not refused to pursue the retreating units.

On February 12, Bolshevik forces attacked Alytus. Lithuanian 5th, 6th, 7th, and 8th companies of the 1st Infantry Regiment had to withstand pressure from the Red Army, while members of the German units left their posts. During this battle, the first Lithuanian officer to die in the wars was killed: Antanas Juozapavičius, the commander of the 1st Infantry Regiment. After the loss of their commander, the regiment began retreating towards Marijampolė. On the night of February 14–15, German forces retook Alytus.

Towards the end of 1918, the officer Povilas Plechavičius, together with his brother Aleksandras, began organizing partisans in Skuodas. On February 9, the partisans took an oath, and on February 16, they paraded in the town square. A partisan unit commanded by army officers was also organized in Joniškėlis.

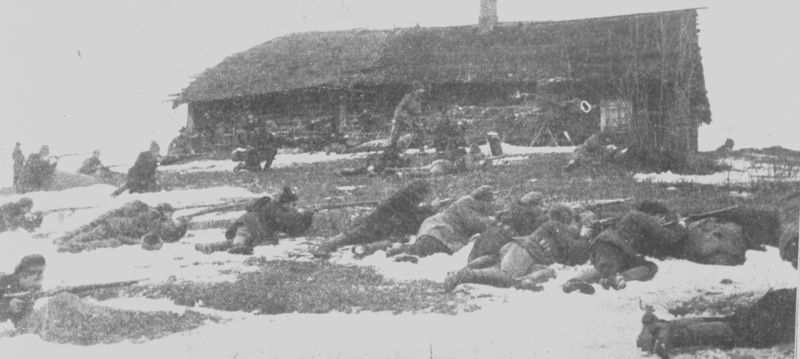
Lithuanian soldiers in action, c. 1919–1920

The advance of Polish (blue arrows), Lithuanian (dark purple arrows), Latvian/German (white arrows from west), and Estonian/Latvian (white arrows from north) forces. The blue line shows the Polish front in May 1920.

The movement of the Bolsheviks towards East Prussia worried Germany, and they sent volunteers (Brigade Shaulen) commanded by General Rüdiger von der Goltz to free the railroad line linking Liepāja, Mažeikiai, Radviliškis, and Kėdainiai. At the end of February, the Lithuanian partisans, supported by German artillery, took Mažeikiai and Seda, and pursued Bolsheviks to Kuršėnai. On February 27, 1919, German volunteers supported by Plechavičius' partisans and Joniškėlis' partisans defeated the Samogitian Regiment in a battle near Luokė. By that time, the regiment had been incorporated into the Red Army's 2nd Latvian International Riflemen Division. On the same day, the Lithuanian–Byelorussian Soviet Socialist Republic (Litbel) was declared. On March 7, 1919, the Germans took the town of Kuršėnai, on March 11 – Šiauliai, and on March 12 – Radviliškis. On March 14, Lithuanian partisans and German forces captured Šeduva. The German troops were active in Lithuania until May 31, 1919.

In Kėdainiai, a stationed volunteer regiment had secured its positions; in March, it started small expeditions into nearby towns. Local volunteers with good knowledge of the location succeeded in driving Bolshevik supporters out of Ramygala, Truskava, and Krekenava, but these areas were soon recaptured by the Bolsheviks. These expeditions into several towns were successfully carried out until the end of March. As a reward for its successful operations, the volunteer regiment was given a name on March 22: the Separate Panevėžys Volunteer Regiment. Due to a succession of losses, the Bolshevik forces stationed in Panevėžys and Kupiškis rebelled, and were quelled only by a Red Army Division from neighboring Latvia. The Bolshevik morale underwent deeper declines, and between March 19 and March 24, their forces left Panevėžys. Lithuanian forces entered the city on March 26, but the Red Army retook it on April 4.

In April, the Lithuanian army began moving towards Vilnius, taking Žąsliai and Vievis, but their advances stopped on April 8. In the meantime, on April 19, the Polish army had taken Vilnius from the Bolsheviks and forced them to withdraw their left wing from territories south of the Neris River. The shortened front line that resulted allowed Lithuania to send stronger forces to northeastern Lithuania and carry out operations there. By May 3, the Separate Panevėžys Volunteer Regiment, supported by the 18th regiment of Saxonian volunteers, had secured Siesikai, Atkočiai, and Deltuva. They had also captured Ukmergė; Lithuanian units were the first to enter the city.

At the beginning of March, the mobilization began, and Lithuanian forces increased their numbers. At the end of April, the Lithuanian army's chain of command was reformed. General Silvestras Žukauskas was designated Chief of Staff, and on May 7, he assumed command of the entire Lithuanian army. A complete reorganization took place over the next few weeks, and the strengthened Lithuanian forces were now ready to push the Red Army back. Žukauskas decided to concentrate his Lithuanian forces in two areas. The first brigade, centered in the Ukmergė–Utena–Zarasai region, was called the Vilkmergė Group; the second brigade, centered in the Kėdainiai-Panevėžys-Rokiškis region, was called the Panevėžys Group. Operations planning was undertaken during the middle of May.

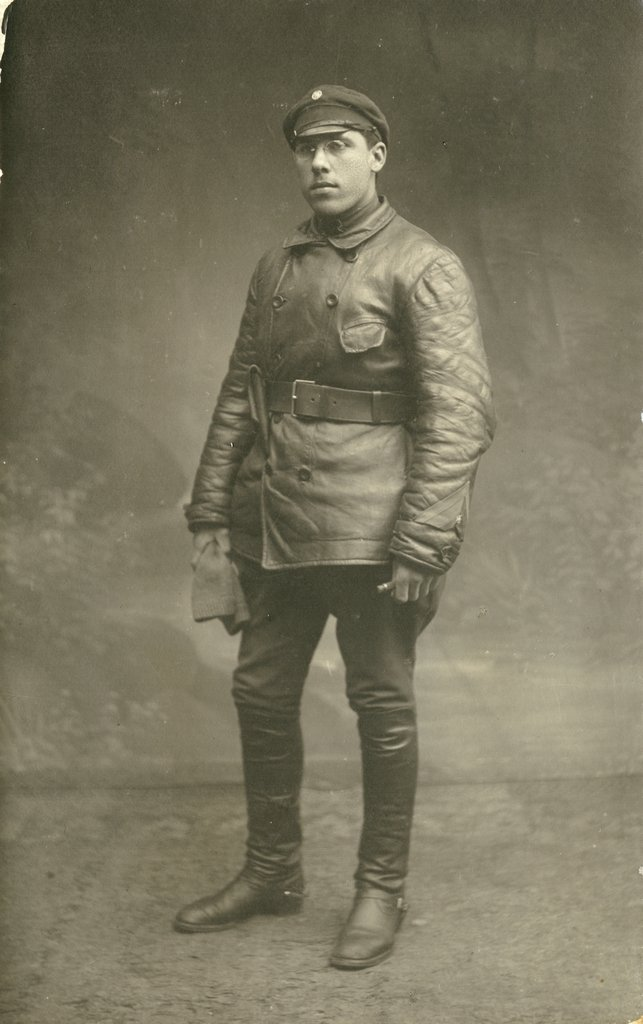
Povilas Plechavičius in 1919 during the Lithuanian Wars of Independence

On May 17, the reorganized army carried out its first operation, capturing the town of Kurkliai. Preparations were made for an advance on Anykščiai, which was taken on May 19, along with Skiemonys and Alanta. On May 22, the Lithuanian forces launched an advance on Utena, reaching the village of Diktarai. The initiative was met by a counterattack, and the Lithuanian forces retreated. The attack was stopped for several days, and the line Alanta-Skiemonys-Anykščiai was taken. A drive towards Utena started on May 31, and the city was secured on June 2.

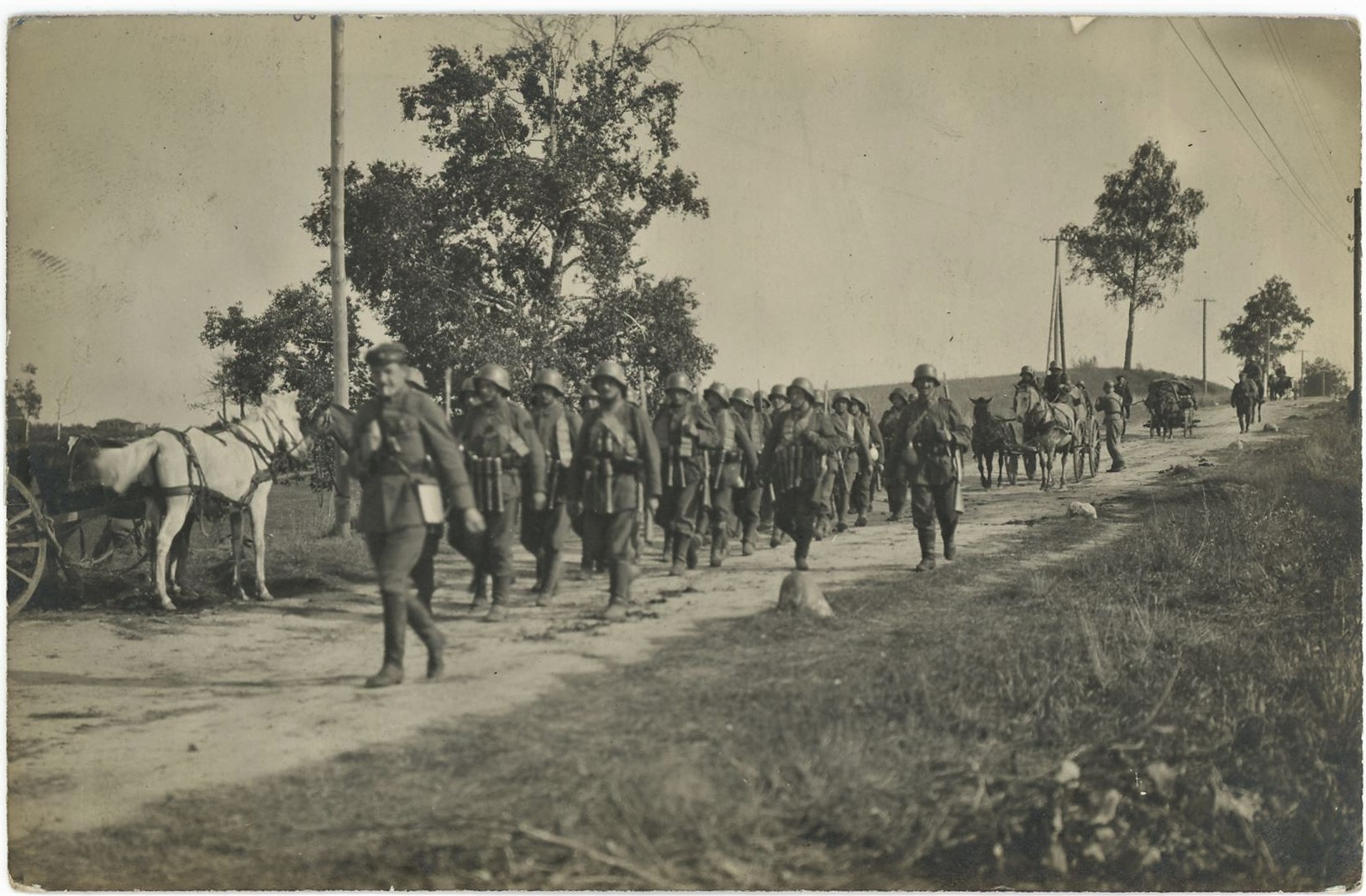
Grenadiers of the Vilnius battalion marching to the war front against the Bolsheviks near Kalkūnai, 1919

The Panevėžys Group launched a drive towards Panevėžys on May 18. On May 19, the brigade secured Panevėžys and Raguva; on May 20, its field staff moved to Panevėžys. The city withstood a Bolshevik attack that took place on May 21 and 22. On May 24, Žukauskas ordered both groups to push farther. The Panevėžys Group advanced towards Kupiškis and secured Subačius on May 25. On May 30, they took Rokiškis; Bolshevik forces left Kupiškis on the night of May 30–31, and Lithuania secured that city on June 1. The advance continued, and on June 10, Lithuanian forces reached the territory controlled by Latvian partisans (Green Guard) and supplied them with munitions.

The Lithuanian successes continued, and by the end of August, the Bolsheviks were defeated near Zarasai. On October 2, Lithuania took Griva, a suburb of Daugavpils. The Lithuanian forces stopped at the Daugava River near the border with Latvia, and the front line stabilized. The short-lived Litbel government was discontinued.

On July 12, 1920, Lithuania signed a peace treaty with the Russian SFSR. Russia recognized Lithuania's independence and its right to the Vilnius Region. This treaty was not recognized by Poland or by the short-lived Democratic Republic of Belarus. Several historians have asserted that despite its treaty with Russia, Lithuania was very close to being taken over by local communist forces that were backed by the Bolsheviks. In this view, it was only the Polish victory against the Soviets in the Polish–Soviet War that disrupted these plans.

== War against the Bermontians ==
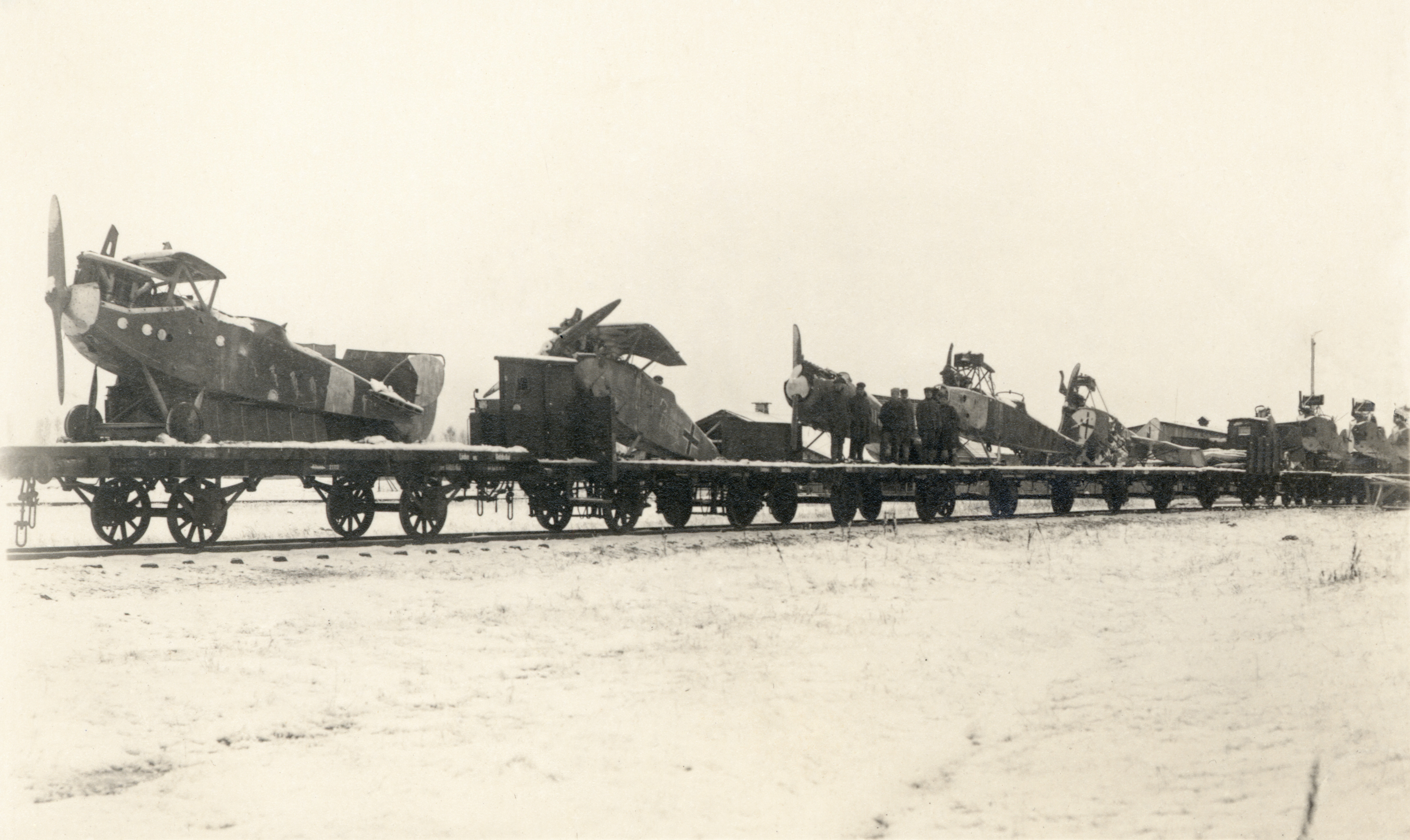
Bermontians' planes captured by the Lithuanian Army near Radviliškis

Lithuanian–Bermontian War
- Part of the Lithuanian Wars of Independence
Date	July–December 1919
Location	Lithuania
Result	Lithuanian victory

Belligerents
Lithuania	West Russian Volunteer Army

Commanders and leaders
(Lithuania) Kazys Ladiga	Pavel Bermondt-Avalov

Strength
around 20,000 men	52,000 men with artillery and planes (unused)

The Bermontians, named for their leader Pavel Bermondt-Avalov and formally known as the West Russian Volunteer Army, were a mixed German-Russian army. The army included Russian prisoners of war, released by the German Empire after promising to fight against the Bolsheviks in the Russian Civil War, and members of the Freikorps, stationed in Latvia and Lithuania after Germany lost the war. The official goal of this army was to fight Bolsheviks along with Aleksandr Kolchak's forces, but its actual agenda was the retention of German power in the territories they had taken during World War I.

At first Freikorps, which were later a part of the West Russian Volunteer Army, operated mostly in Latvia, but in July 1919, they crossed the Lithuanian–Latvian border and took the town of Kuršėnai. At that time, the Lithuanians were engaged in battles with the Bolsheviks and could only issue diplomatic protests. By October, the Bermontians had taken considerable territories in western Lithuania (Samogitia), including the cities of Šiauliai, Biržai, and Radviliškis. After they had annexed a town, the Bermontians enforced a rule that only the Russian language could be used to conduct administration. They became notorious for robbing and looting the local populace, who began organizing local partisan groups.

During October 1919, Lithuanian forces attacked the Bermontians, achieving an important victory on November 21 and 22 near Radviliškis, a major railway center. The Lithuanians collected significant spoils of war there, including 30 airplanes and 10 cannons. Later clashes were stopped by the intervention of an Entente representative, the French General Henri Niessel, who oversaw the withdrawal of German troops. The Lithuanian military followed the retreating Bermontian soldiers to prevent them from further looting and to ensure their complete evacuation. By December 15, the Bermontians were completely removed from Lithuania.

== War against Poland ==
Polish–Lithuanian War
- Part of the Lithuanian Wars of Independence and the Polish–Soviet War
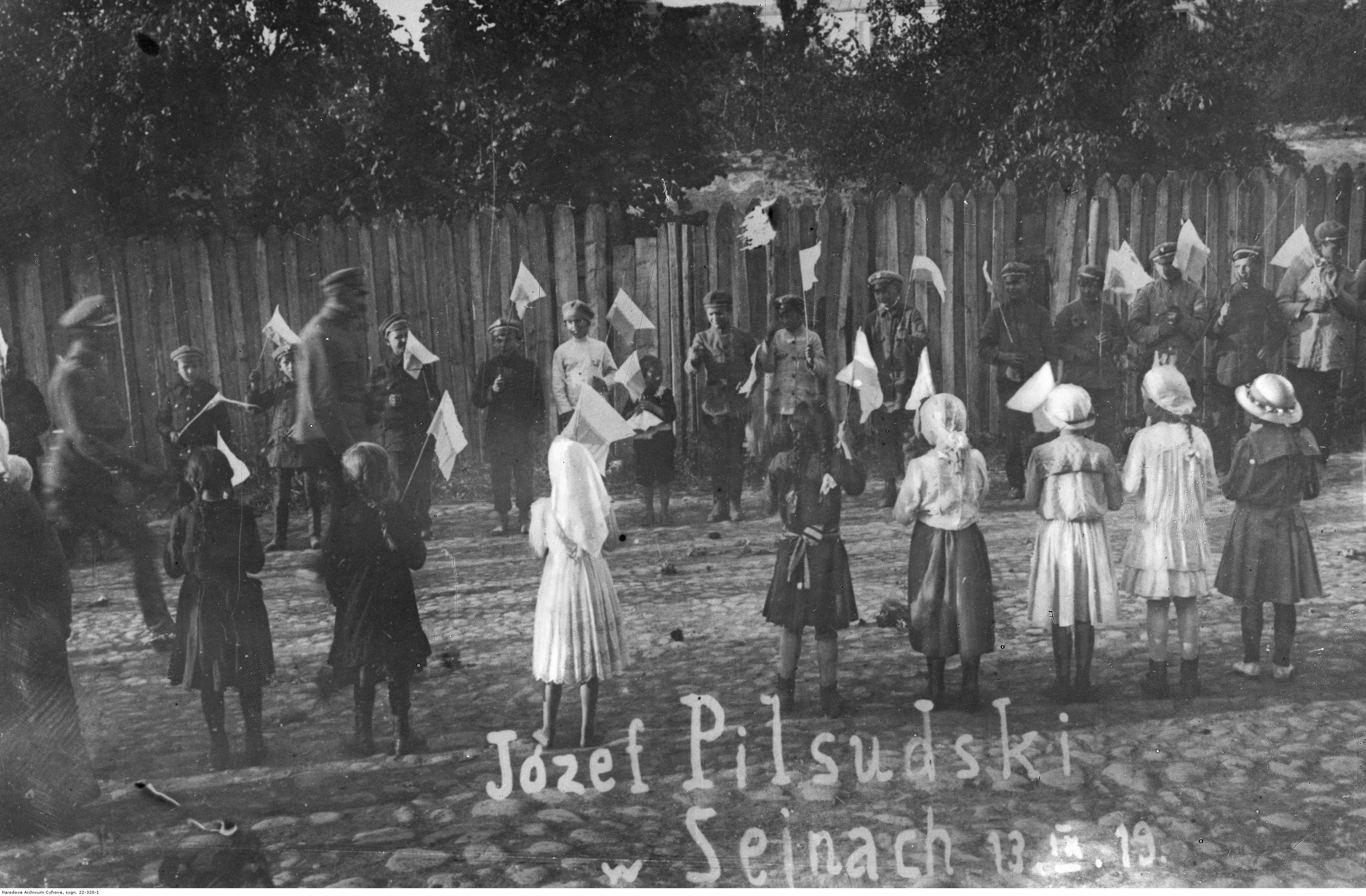
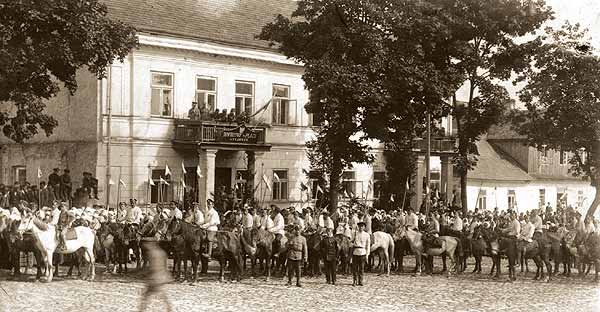
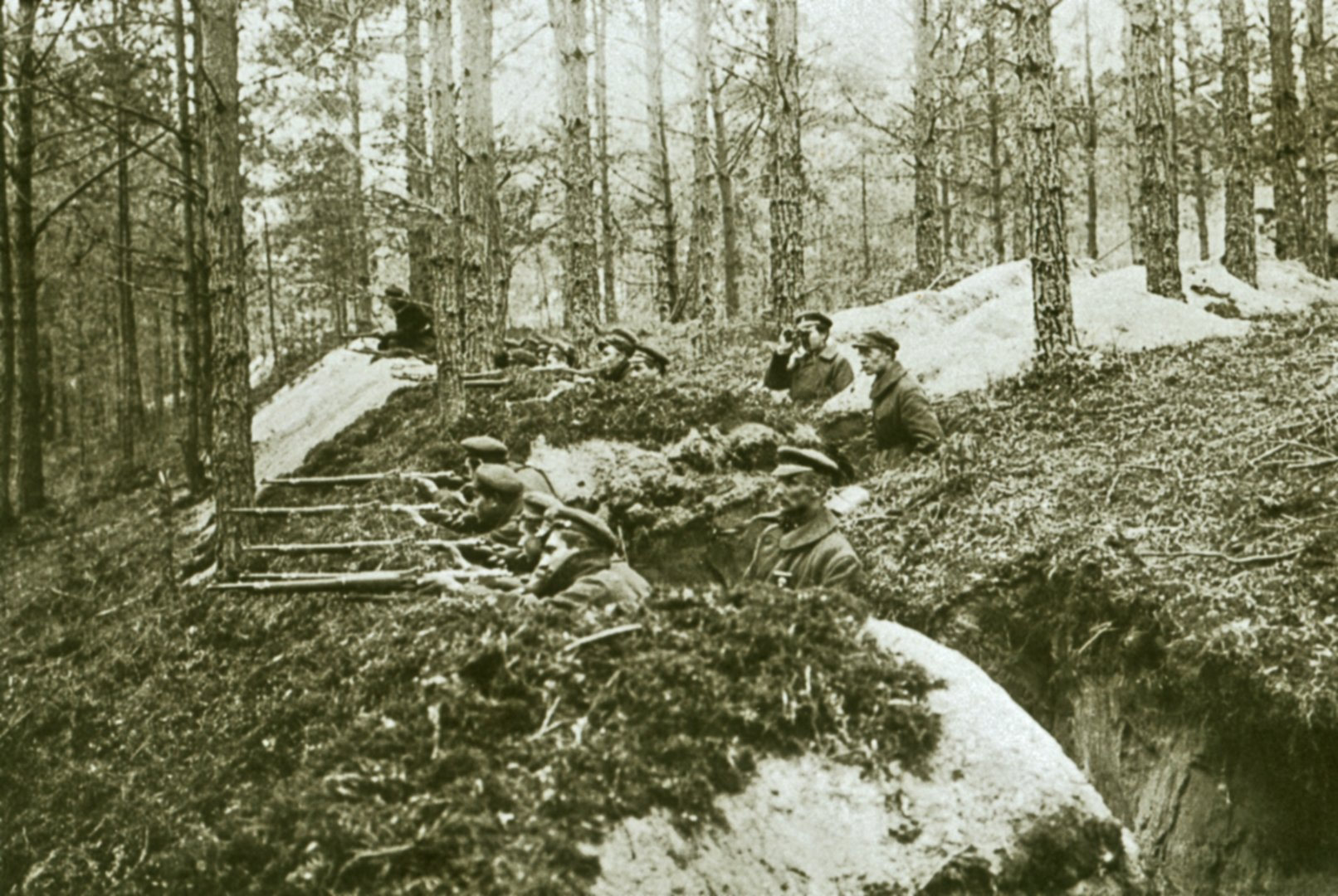
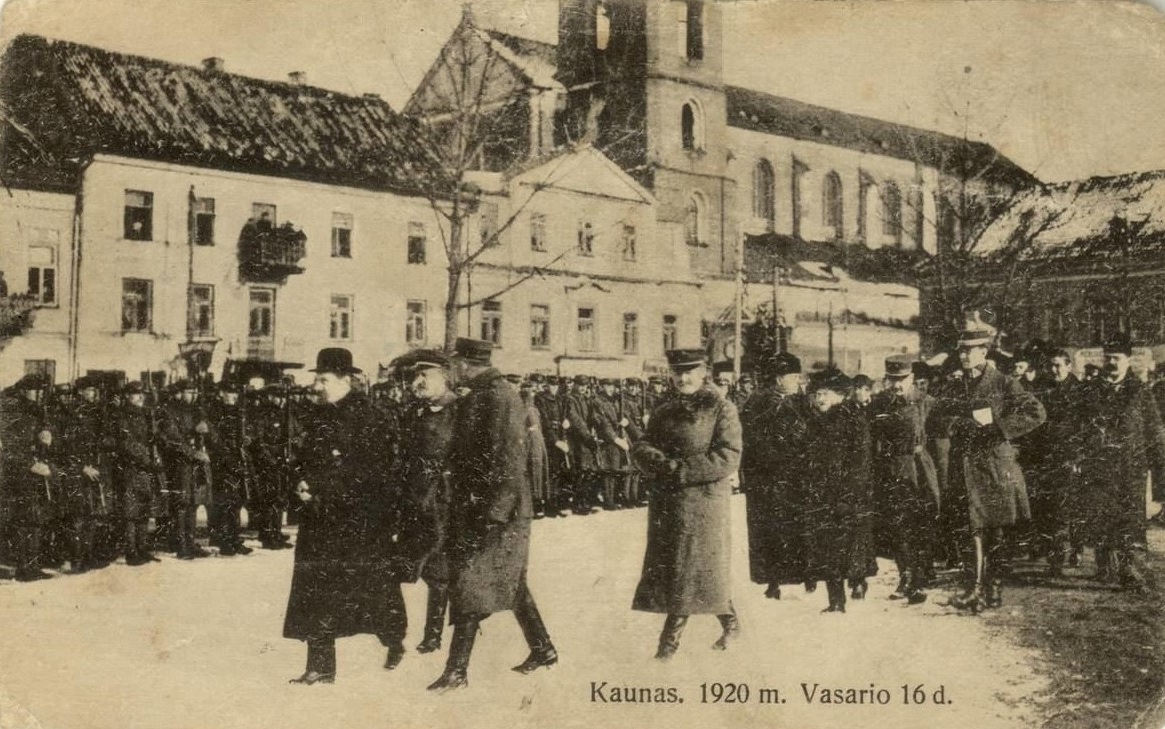
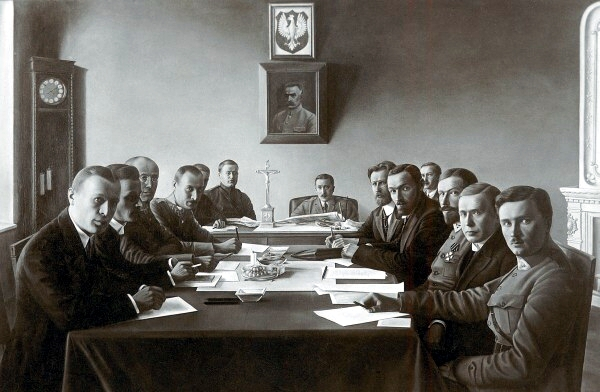
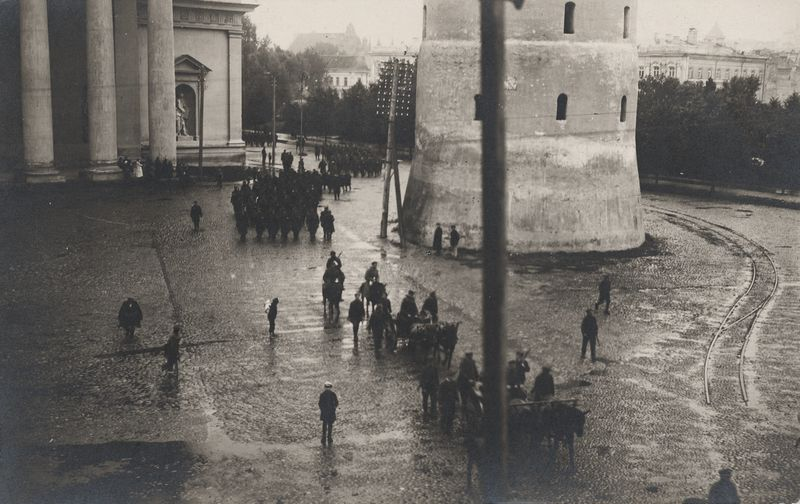
- Józef Piłsudski in Sejny on 13 August 1919; Polish cavalry parade in Sejny; Antanas Smetona inspecting Lithuanian soldiers on 16 February 1920 in Kaunas during the commemoration of the Act of Independence of Lithuania; The Lithuanian Army in Cathedral Square, Vilnius in 1920; Lithuanian and Polish delegations negotiating the Suwałki Agreement, October 1920; The Lithuanian 5th Infantry Regiment in Vievis' forests fighting against Żeligowski's soldiers in autumn 1920
Date	May 1919 – November 29, 1920
Location	Suwałki and Vilnius regions
Result	Polish victory
Territorial changes	Suwałki and Vilnius regions ruled by Poland (with some adjacent areas) until 1939

Belligerents
Poland; Central Lithuania (1920)	Lithuania

Commanders and leaders
(Second Polish Republic) Józef Piłsudski; (Second Polish Republic) Adam Nieniewski; (Second Polish Republic) Lucjan Żeligowski	(Lithuania) Silvestras Žukauskas; (Lithuania) Stasys Nastopka (surrendered); (Lithuania) Antanas Smetona; (Lithuania) Mykolas Sleževičius; (Lithuania) Konstantinas Žukas

Casualties and losses
264 dead (incomplete data)	232 dead against the Polish army; 222 dead against Żeligowski's troops

Lithuanian and Polish forces had already clashed in spring 1919.

=== Summer 1920 ===
In June 1920, the Soviet Russian army had taken Vilnius. Shortly after their defeat in the Battle of Warsaw, the withdrawing Red Army handed the city over to Lithuania under the terms of the peace treaty signed on July 12. Negotiations were started in an attempt to avoid an armed conflict between Poland and Lithuania. On October 7, the Suwałki Agreement was signed. However, on October 8, before the agreement was to formally take effect, the volunteer 1st Lithuanian-Belarusian Division under the command of general Lucjan Żeligowski staged a mutiny. The Vilnius region was quickly seized due to the Lithuanian troops being dispersed on a wide frontline and the Polish forces overwhelming Lithuanian units by their larger numbers. After gathering enough troops, the subsequent Lithuanian counteroffensive attempt in November that had already yielded success at Širvintos and Giedraičiai was stopped by the Military Commission of League of Nations.

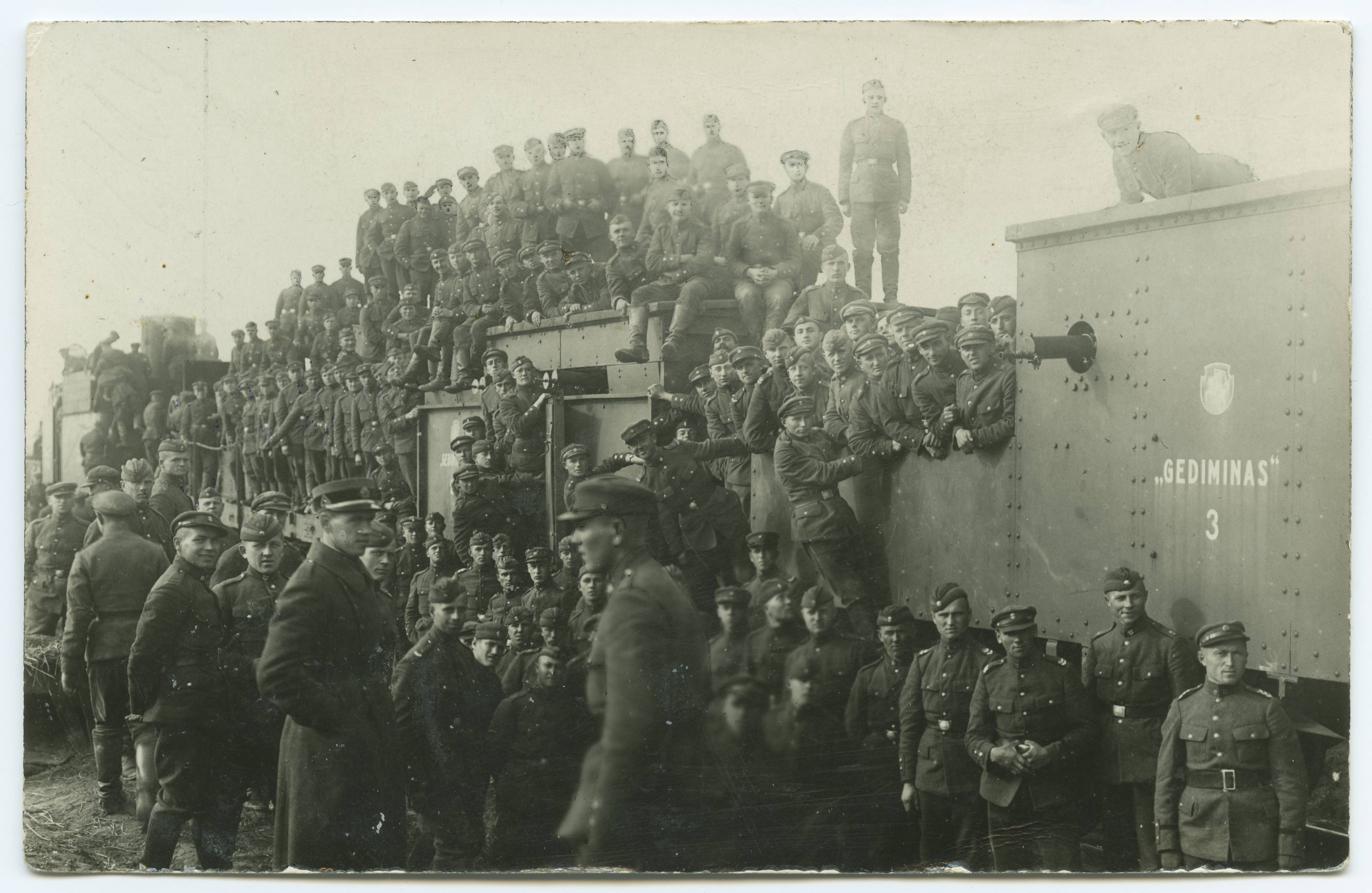
Lithuanian armoured train Gediminas 3 and Lithuanian soldiers

Kaunas became the temporary capital of Lithuania for 19 years due to the Polish forces seizing Vilnius in contravention of international agreements. The dispute over Vilnius was only resolved in October 1939 when Lithuanian troops were allowed to re-enter Lithuania's de jure capital as part of the Soviet–Lithuanian Mutual Assistance Treaty, into which Lithuania was effectively forced due to the overwhelming Soviet forces massed on its border.

=== Żeligowski's Mutiny ===
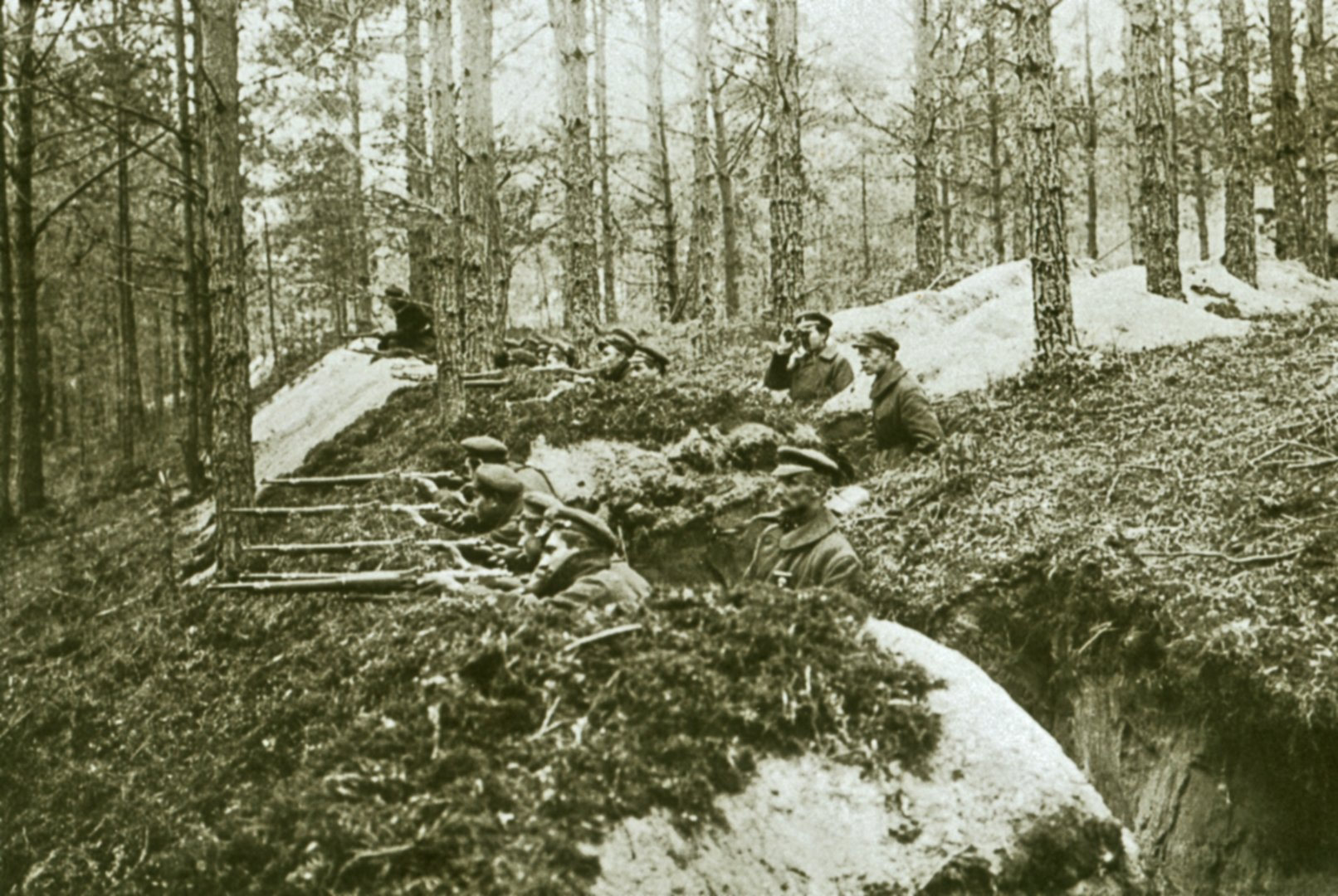
The Lithuanian 5th Infantry Regiment in the Vievis forests during the fighting with the Polish Army's 1st Lithuanian-Belarusian Division

A staged mutiny arranged by the Polish Chief of State Józef Piłsudski was carried out by 1st Lithuanian–Belarusian Division under the command of General Lucjan Żeligowski on October 8, 1920. The 1st Lithuanian–Belarusian Division, part of the Polish Army, consisted mostly of Poles but also some Lithuanians and Belarusians, took control of Vilnius on October 9, 1920, which led to the separation of the official Lithuanian capital and the surrounding Vilnius region from Lithuania until World War II. This military action is considered as a continuation of the Polish-Lithuanian war in historiography.

=== Żeligowski's October Offensive ===
In October 1920, General Lucjan Żeligowski led a military offensive against the Lithuanian army following his mutiny that captured Vilnius. The Lithuanians, despite being outnumbered, attempted a counter-offensive on October 18, but the experienced Polish forces successfully repelled them near Rykantai. A notable event was the Polish raid on Juodeliai, where the 13th Wilno Uhlan Regiment captured the Lithuanian General Stasys Nastopka and caused the Lithuanian army nearby to retreat.

== Klaipėda Revolt ==
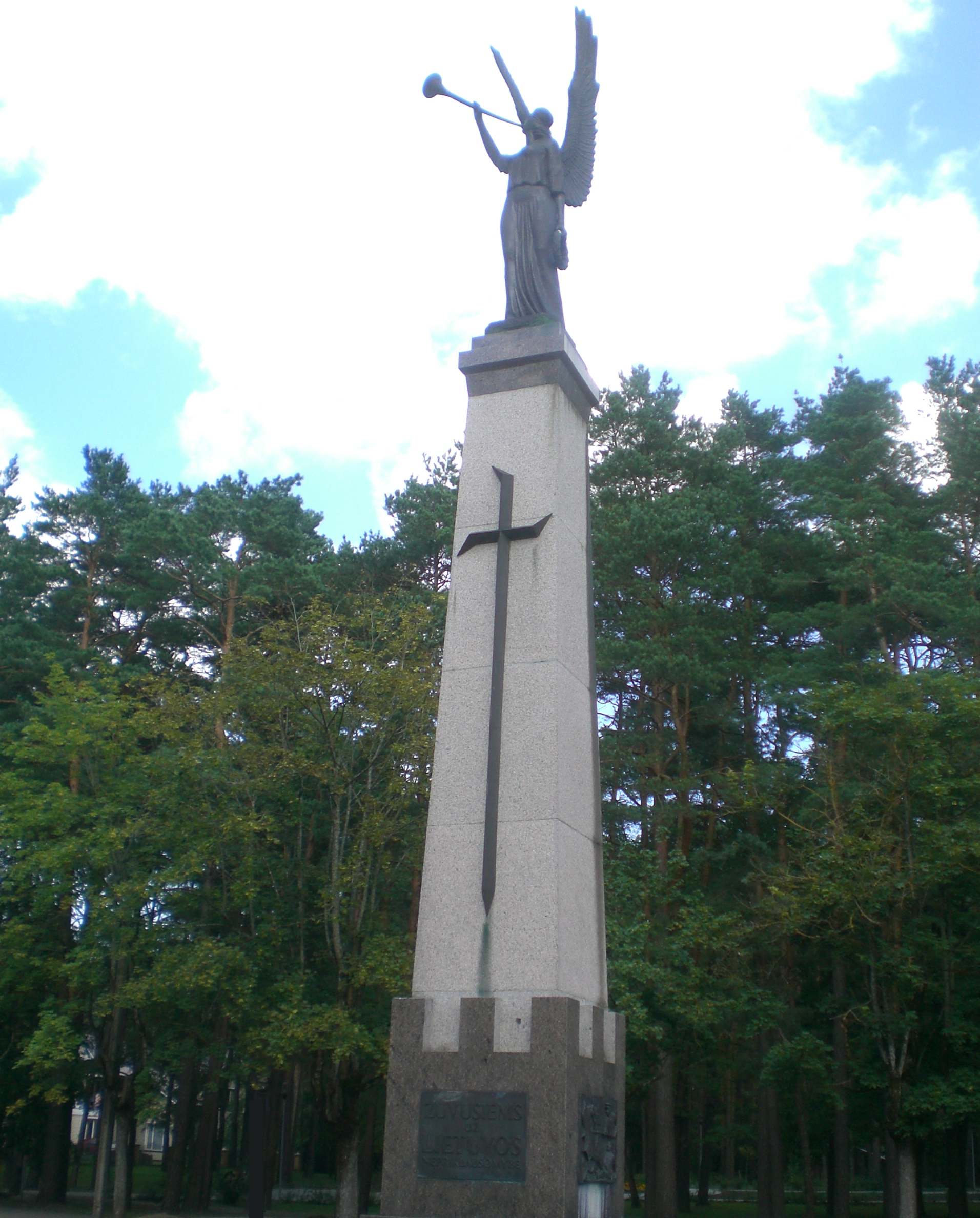
War memorial in Alytus to Lithuanians who died in the Lithuanian Wars of Independence

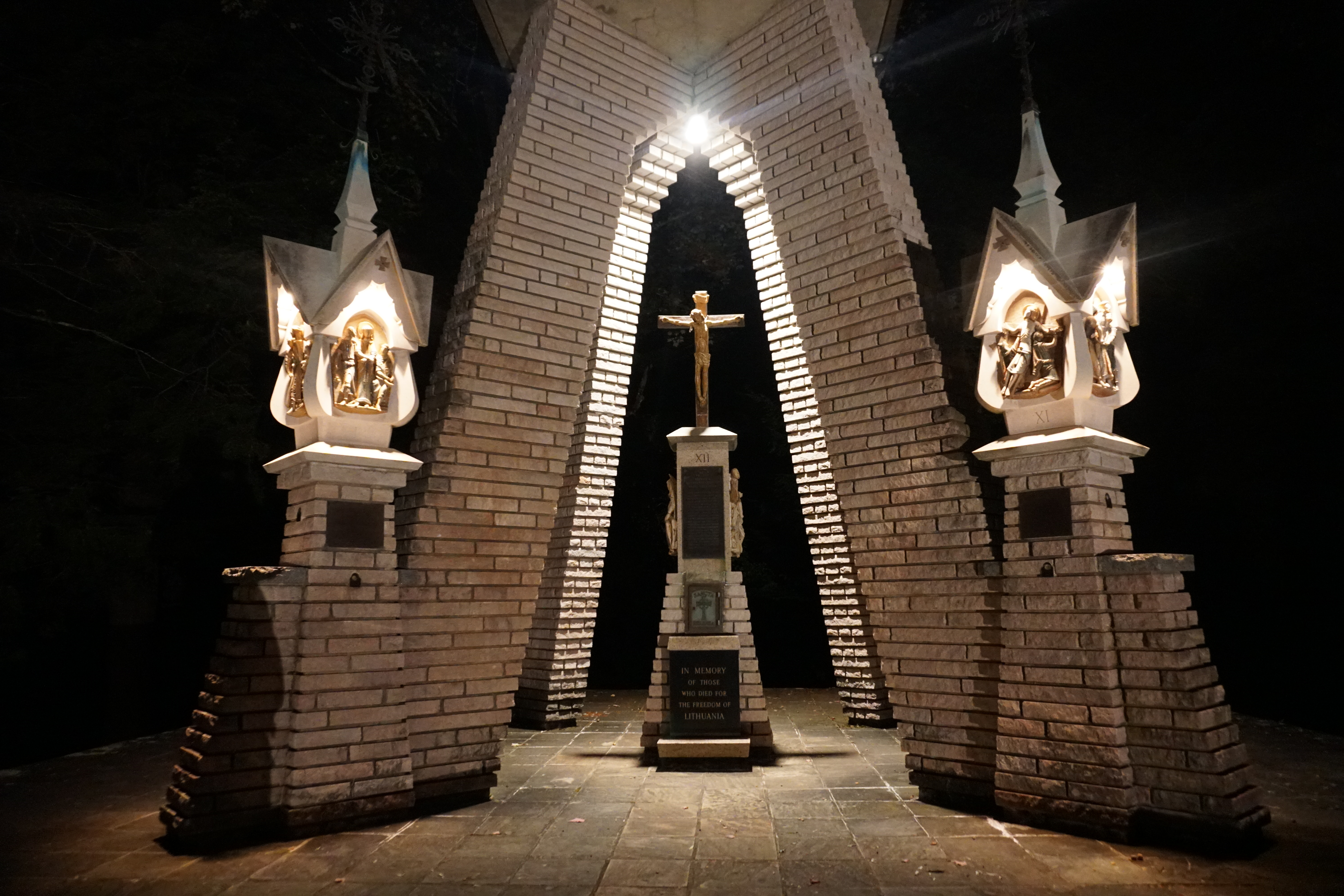
Memorial in Kennebunkport, Maine to Lithuanians who died in the Lithuanian Wars of Independence

== See also ==
- List of states and regions involved in the Russian Civil War
- Bibliography of the Russian Revolution and Civil War
- Outline of the Russian Revolution and Civil War
- Latvian War of Independence
- Estonian War of Independence
- Polish-Soviet War
- Central Lithuania
- Forest Brothers
