= 5th Infantry Regiment (Lithuania) =

Former Lithuanian Army formation (1919–40)

5th Infantry Regiment of the Lithuanian Grand Duke Kęstutis
- 5-asis pėstininkų Lietuvos Didžiojo kunigaikščio Kęstučio pulkas
- Active: March 2, 1919 – October 27, 1940
- Country: Lithuania
- Branch: Lithuanian Army
- Type: Infantry
- Patron: Lithuanian Grand Duke Kęstutis
- Motto: Krauju ir mirtimi tėvynę nelaimėje vaduosim

The 5th Infantry Regiment (Lithuanian: 5-asis pėstininkų pulkas), later the 5th Infantry Regiment of the Lithuanian Grand Duke Kęstutis (Lithuanian: 5-asis pėstininkų Lietuvos Didžiojo kunigaikščio Kęstučio pulkas) was an infantry regiment that served in the Lithuanian Army during the Interwar period.

== 1919 ==
=== Spring ===
==== March ====
The regiment was founded on 2 March 1919. Initially, it was called the Separate Battalion (Lithuanian: Atskiras batalionas). The regiment began to be organized in Kaunas by the Commandant of Kaunas, Kazys Škirpa, by the order of the Minister of National Defense. The Separate Battalion's core were the 5th and 6th Infantry Companies and the 2nd Hussar Squadron. These units were detached from Kaunas Military Commandant's Office (Karo komendantūra, abbr. KK). The infantry companies became the 1st and 2nd companies, which were soon joined by new volunteers.

On March 23, 20 soldiers from the Kaunas city KK training team and 16 soldiers from the grenadier team arrived. On March 28, these were joined by the Kaunas' training team's soldiers of the 1st and 4th Company, in addition to several volunteer machine gunners from Vilnius. The newly arrived 1st company was renamed as the 1st Company, the 4th Company as the 2nd Company, while the former 1st Company was renamed as the 3rd Company, the 2nd Company - the 4th.

By the end of March, there were 20 officers and 700 soldiers, almost all of which were volunteers, in the unit.

==== April–May ====
In April, the battalion was engaged in fights against Soviet Russia's Red Army. On 8 May 1919, the regiment fought against the Polish Army.

=== Summer ===
By mid-1919, 24 officers, 726 soldiers, 4 war officials and one doctor served in the battalion. Their armament was 8 machine guns, 686 rifles, 120 pistols and revolvers, about 104,000 rounds of ammunition.

On 20 June 1919, this battalion was named the Vilnius Battalion (Lithuanian: Vilniaus batalionas). In July, the battalion was assigned to the 1st Infantry Brigade. The regiment fought against the Bolsheviks at Pajautiškės, Stašiūnai, Zarasai and Imbradas. After battles with the Soviet Russian Army ceased, the unit was dislocated in Žiežmariai.

=== Autumn ===
On 10 November 1919, the Vilnius Battalion was renamed and reinforced, thus becoming the 5th Infantry Regiment. Battalions I and II were formed from the existing companies and one KK company from Seinai.

On 21 and 22 November 1919, the regiment fought against the Bermontians.

== 1920 ==
Battalion III was formed in January 1920 from the Pasvalys KK and from the recruits of Telšiai County. In January 1920, the regiment was part of the 2nd Brigade. On 7 February 1920, the 5th Infantry Regiment was given the name of the Grand Duke of Lithuania Kęstutis.

In mid-1920, the regiment was re-dislocated to Kaišiadorys. Later, the regiment fought against the Polish army once more. In 1920, the regiment fought against the Polish army near Seinai, Augustavas and fought in the Battle of Beržininkai.

In the Lithuanian Wars of Independence, the regiment lost one officer and 53 soldiers, with roughly another hundred soldiers being wounded.

From December 1920, the regiment guarded the Lithuanian-Polish demarcation line at the sector of Giedraičiai–Labanoras–Salakas. At the end of 1920, the regiment had 47 officers, 2,410 soldiers, 6 war officials, 3 doctors, and one chaplain. The regiment possessed 34 machine-guns, 1,780 rifles, 133 carbines, 64 pistols and revolvers, 133 bayonets, 149 horses and other military equipment.

== Interwar ==
From 1922, the regiment's garrison was moved to Upper Panemunė in Kaunas from Panevėžys. The regiment was part of the 2nd Infantry Division.

== Soviet occupation and disbandment ==
The 5th Infantry Regiment of the Lithuanian Grand Duke Kęstutis was renamed to 5th Infantry Regiment on 25 July 1940, following Lithuania's occupation by the Soviet Union. Finally, the regiment was disbanded on October 27.

== Regiment commanders ==
- 1919 – Officer Kazys Škirpa
- 1920 – Captain Antanas Zubrys
- 1920 – Lieutenant colonel Mykolas Velykis
- 1921 – Lieutenant colonel Pranas Kaunas
- 1922 – Colonel Juozas Vidugiris
- 1925–1927 – General Staff Colonel Stasys Pundzevičius
- 1933 – General Staff Colonel Stasys Raštikis
- 1936–1940 – General Staff Colonel Albinas Čepas
- 1940 – Lieutenant colonel Juozas Listopadskis

== Sources ==
=== Books ===
- Lesčius, Vytautas (2004). Lietuvos Kariuomenė Nepriklausomybės Kovose 1918–1920 (PDF) (in Lithuanian). Vilnius: Generolo Jono Žemaičio Lietuvos karo akademija. ISBN 9955-423-23-4.
- Surgailis, Gintautas (2017). Penktasis pėstininkų Didžiojo Lietuvos kunigaikščio Kęstučio pulkas (PDF). Lietuvos kariuomenės istorija (in Lithuanian). Vilnius: Generolo Jono Žemaičio Lietuvos karo akademija. ISBN 9786098074642.
- Steponaitis, Vytautas, ed. (1934). 5 pėstininkų Didžiojo Lietuvos kunigaikščio Kęstučio pulkas, 1919–1934 (in Lithuanian). Kaunas: Žaibas.
- Ruzgas, Vincas, ed. (1932). "VIII. Krašto apsauga". Visa Lietuva: Informacinė knyga 1931 m. (in Lithuanian). Kaunas: Spaudos Fondas.

=== Other ===
- Vydrina, Elena (2008). "lcva fondo 518 pažyma". Lietuvos centrinis valstybės archyvas (in Lithuanian).
