= Zarasai offensive =

- Part of Lithuanian–Soviet War
Date	August 23 – September 1, 1919
Location	Northeastern Lithuania
Result	Lithuanian victory

Belligerents
Lithuania	Russian SFSR

Strength
	12,000

Zarasai offensive (Lithuanian: Zarasų operacija) – a Lithuanian Army offensive against the Soviet Russian occupation in northeastern Lithuania, carried out from August 23 to September 1, 1919, during the Lithuanian–Soviet War. At the end of the operation, units of the Polish Army joined the fight against the Lithuanian forces.

== Background ==
On November 11, 1918, after Germany's capitulation in World War I, Soviet Russia annulled the Treaty of Brest-Litovsk and the Red Army began its westward offensive of 1918–1919. Following the retreating Imperial German army, it invaded Lithuania at the end of December 1918 and by the beginning of 1919 had already occupied almost two-thirds of Lithuania's territory and was preparing to attack Kaunas. The situation in Lithuania was critical. The German army fought the Bolsheviks only more actively in Samogitia, and from May onwards it did not participate at all in military operations against the Red Army.

=== Spring 1919 ===
The first successful battles of the Lithuanian army against the attacking Bolsheviks took place near Kėdainiai in early February. After that, the Red Army units attacking Kaunas from the east were repelled, and Alytus was retaken. On March 1, 1919, the M. Sleževičius government agreed on the coordination of military actions against the Red Army with Latvia (which was also fighting its War of Independence), and from mid-April, Poland also began its offensive against the Bolsheviks (the Vilnius offensive of the Polish–Soviet War).

=== Lithuanian offensives in May–June 1919 ===
During major offensives organized by the Lithuanian Army, Ukmergė was liberated on May 3, Panevėžys on May 26 (Kurkliai–Panevėžys offensive), and Utena on June 2 (Kupiškis–Utena offensive). After these battles, the front line stabilized in July 1919, and only reconnaissance actions and skirmishes took place. From July 15 to August 25, both the Lithuanians and the Bolsheviks prepared for further battles.

== Order of Battle ==
=== Lithuanian forces ===
The Lithuanian forces consisted of the:

- 1st Brigade (1st and 3rd Infantry Regiments, the Kaunas, Ukmergė, Vilnius battalions)
- 2nd Brigade (2nd Infantry Regiment, the Marijampolė, Panevėžys, Joniškėlis and Šiauliai battalions)

These forces were supported by 4 artillery batteries and 2 cavalry squadrons from the 1st Hussar Regiment. The Lithuanian army already had officers from the first class of the War School of Kaunas. The Lithuanian forces were assisted by active partisan units. The partisan unit "Green Guard" operating in the Dusetos area was particularly distinguished.

- 1st Infantry Regiment
- 2nd Infantry Regiment
- 5 battalions (Panevėžys, Vilnius, Marijampolė, Ukmergė, Joniškėlis)
- four artillery batteries
- two cavalry squadrons from the 1st Hussar Regiment

=== Soviet forces ===
Six Red Army infantry regiments, three so-called communist battalions and three special forces units, all of which numbered around 12,000 soldiers, were deployed on the Bolshevik front against the Lithuanian Army:

- 6 infantry regiments
- 3 separate battalions
- 6 artillery batteries
- 2 cavalry squadrons

The Bolsheviks had a lot of good artillery.

== Offensive ==
The Bolshevik forces, although much larger, were scattered, without a unified leadership. In Zarasai front, the Bolshevik forces were led by the Lithuanian-born communist Feliksas Baltušis-Žemaitis. The scattered Bolshevik forces were unable to exploit the fortifications left over from World War I, which were built between the Zarasai lakes. The Red Army men, forcibly mobilized by the Bolsheviks, had no motivation and often refused to march forward against the Lithuanians. The Bolshevik front leadership could only rely on communist units, but they were a minority. In preparation for further fighting, the Bolsheviks conducted an intensive propaganda campaign, issued appeals calling for an uprising against their commanders, claiming that they were the children of landowners, etc. According to the participant in the battles, Colonel Jonas Petruitis, there were so many propaganda leaflets that you could fill entire carts with them. The propaganda campaign was not successful among the soldiers in both the Panevėžys and Ukmergė Groups, although many of the volunteers were barefoot, ragged, poorly fed, and poorly armed.

The Commander-in-Chief of the Lithuanian Army, General Silvestras Žukauskas, in his telegraph No. 101 of August 22, 1919, ordered an attack on the entire front from August 23 and the capture of Daugavpils.

=== August 25–31 ===
The first operation was launched by the Ukmergė Group. The following was achieved:

- On August 25, Zarasai was liberated,
- on August 26 – Smalvos,
- on August 27 – Turmantas railway station,
- on August 28 – Graudinė, Šarlotė and other estates, the villages of Kaupiškės and Raguliškės,
- on August 29 – Šventmuižė and Kriviškės estates, Alūksta (Daugava reached),
- on August 30 – Kalkuonė estate and railway station, approached Daugavpils, established itself on the Daugava.
- On August 31, Lithuanian units were driven out of the Kalkuonė railway station by three Polish infantry battalions.

On September 1, Soviet Russian units attacked Lithuanian and Polish military units; Lithuanian military units counterattacked and reached Daugavpils. Soviet Russian military units retreated to the city, from where they were driven out by Polish and Latvian forces after the Battle of Daugavpils on January 3–5, 1920.

On August 30, the Prime Minister of Lithuania, Mykolas Sleževičius, officially congratulated the Lithuanian army for expelling the Bolsheviks from Lithuanian territory.

== Aftermath ==
On October 6, after the Bolsheviks were pushed back beyond the Daugava, the 1st Infantry Regiment was transferred to guard the demarcation line from Jieznas to Zarasai, the 2nd Infantry Regiment's 1st Battalion from Niklovka to Kalkūnai, the 2nd Battalion from Turmantas to Kalkūnai, and the 3rd Battalion was transferred to the city of Zarasai.

On October 12, both detachments left for the Radviliškis area, where forces were being concentrated for the final battle against the Bermontians.

== Evaluation ==
The Zarasai offensive was a great victory for the young and inexperienced army against a strong enemy. During the fighting, officers Jonas Laurinaitis, Jonas Variakojis, Jurgis Butkus, Maksimas Katche, Kazys Ladyga, Julius Čaplikas and many others particularly distinguished themselves. On September 13, 1919, the President of Lithuania Antanas Smetona congratulated the Supreme Commander-in-Chief Silvestras Žukauskas and all the armed forces on the great victory won and thanked them for the liberation of the Homeland from the Bolshevik yoke. The campaigns of many officers and soldiers were recognized with high state awards.

During the Zarasai offensive, all of Lithuania, that had been occupied by Soviet Russia in 1919, was liberated. Shortly after the successful end of the Zarasai operation, on September 11, Soviet Russia offered Lithuania peace negotiations and on July 12, 1920, the Soviet–Lithuanian Peace Treaty was signed, by which Soviet Russia unconditionally recognized the state of Lithuania.

== Sources ==
- KAM (August 27, 2009). "Zarasų išvadavimo ir bolševikų Raudonosios armijos galutinio išvijimo iš Lietuvos karinė operacija". LR Krašto apsaugos ministerija (in Lithuanian).
- Matekūnas, Petras (1969). "Nepriklausomybės kovos Zarasų apskrities ribose". Karys (in Lithuanian). 2 (1449).
- Petruitis, Jonas (2025). Atsiminimai iš kovų su bolševikais ir bermontininkais (in Lithuanian). Vol. I. Bonus Animus.
- Surgailis, Gintautas (2018). "Zarasų operacija". Visuotinė lietuvių enciklopedija (in Lithuanian). Vilnius.
- VDKM (August 23, 2024). "Prieš 105 metus Lietuvos kariuomenė pradėjo Zarasų operaciją". Vytauto Didžiojo karo muziejus (in Lithuanian).
