= 5th Vilnius Rifle Regiment =

- Active: July 1918 – late 1919
- Country: Soviet Russia
- Size: 836 soldiers (11 Dec. 1918)
- Part of: Western Rifle Division (July 1918 – Jan. 1919); Lithuanian Rifle Division (21 Jan. 1919 – late 1919)
- Engagements: Lithuanian–Soviet War

Commanders
- First commander: M. Shaitanov

5th Vilnius Rifle Regiment (Russian: 5-й Виленский стрелковый полк; Lithuanian: 5-asis Vilniaus šaulių pulkas; Polish: 5 Rewolucyjny Pułk Wileński), renamed from 21 January 1919 to the 7th Lithuanian Red Rifle Regiment (Russian: 7-й Литовский стрелковый полк; Lithuanian: 7-asis lietuvių šaulių pulkas), a unit of the Soviet Russia's Red Army, active from July 1918 to late 1919.

The regiment fought against the Lithuanian Army in the Lithuanian Wars of Independence.

== Formation ==
Formation began in July 1918 in Moscow, mainly from Lithuanians in Russia and it belonged to the Western Rifle Division. The Bolshevik Lithuanian Affairs Commissariat (which involved the Vincas Mickevičius-Kapsukas and Zigmas Angarietis) aided in the regiment's organisation. Initially, it had two battalions, a machine gun team, and headquarters units (more than 800 soldiers in total). The 2nd Battalion, especially, had many Lithuanian Bolsheviks in its ranks.

Positions reached by the Red Army's Pskov Division in December 1918

Targets of the Pskov Division after relief by the Latvian Red Army

On December 11, 1918, when the regiment, separately from the division, departed from Moscow for Daugavpils, it numbered only 836 soldiers, half of whom were Lithuanians. It arrived in Daugavpils on December 14, from where it was dispatched to Švenčionys.

By December 22, 1918, together with the Pskov Division, the regiment, advancing by foot and encountering no resistance marched to the Jēkabpils-Daugavpils-Zarasai-Vidzy-Švenčionys line. There, the division was to remain until the arrival of the Latvian Red Army, which was to take over its Latvian sector of the front. Only after the units of the right-sector were relieved, the Pskov Division was to advance westward in several groups towards Panevėžys and Ukmergė.

For political and propaganda reasons, Vilnius was to be captured earlier by the independently operating Vilnius Rifle Regiment. On December 22, a decree of the Council of People's Commissars was issued in Moscow, allegedly recognizing its puppet state of Lithuanian Soviet Republic and declaring that Soviet Russia would provide "all-round support to the Lithuanian Soviet Government and its army in the struggle for the liberation of Lithuania from the yoke of the bourgeoisie."

== 1919 ==
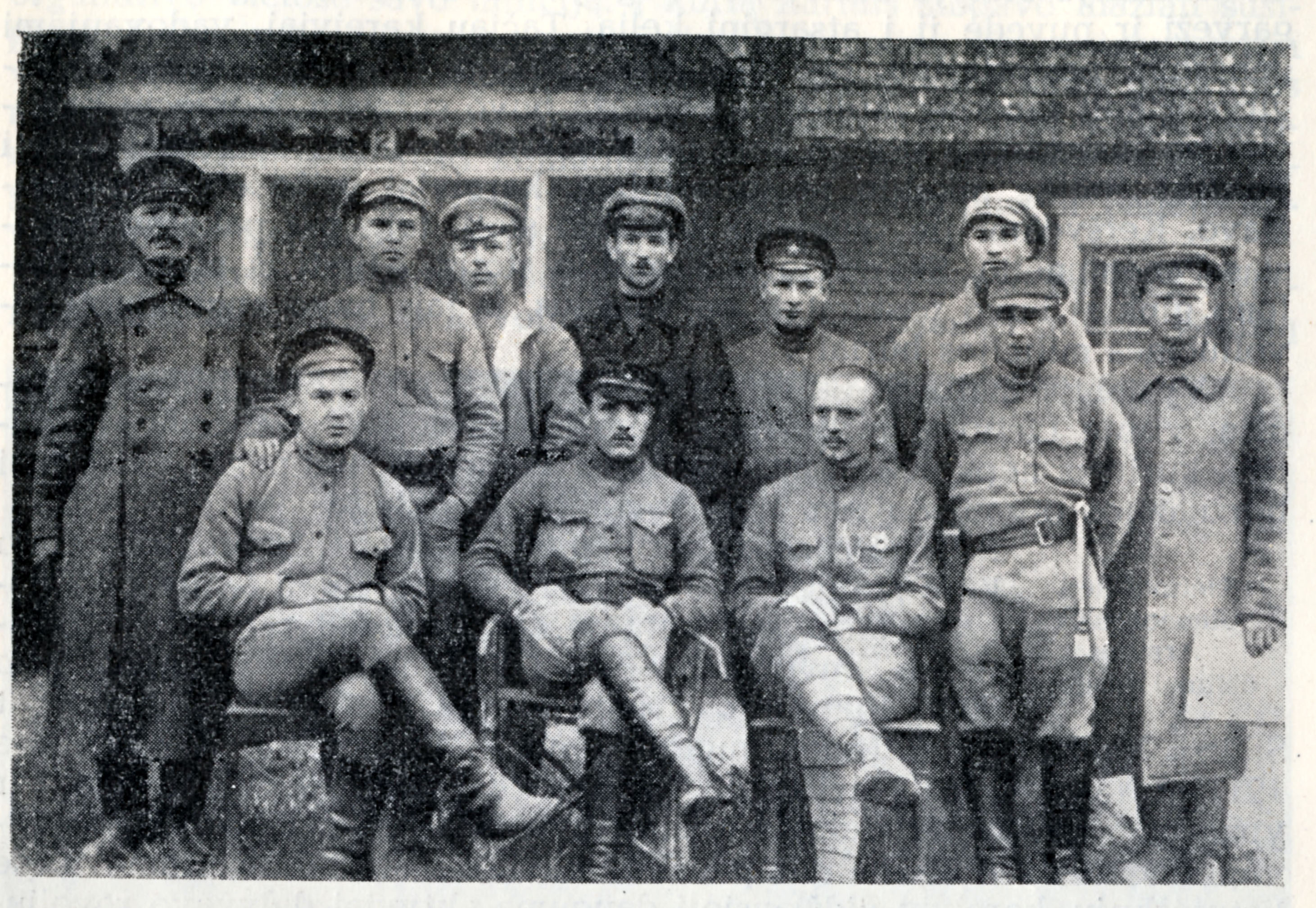
Soldiers of the regiment in Jieznas

=== January ===
On 4–5 January 1919, the regiment fought on the Soviet side in the Battle of Vilnius. On January 5, regiment advanced from the northeast of Vilnius through Nemenčinė onto Antakalnis, opposed by Captain Władysław Dąbrowski's Uhlans and the 3rd Self-Defence Rifle Battalion. Meanwhile, from the southeast, the 17th Rifle Division's 146th Rifle Regiment attacked along the Ashmyany-Vilnius road.

The Vilnius Rifle Regiment achieved the greatest success among the Soviet forces, first capturing the Antakalnis suburb and then capturing the Hill of Three Crosses, which overlooked the Vilnius Old Town. This allowed Soviet artillery to effectively bombard not only Užupis, where the Vilnius defense headquarters was located, secured by the 4th PMO Battalion, but also the city center.

Thereafter, in the city, the 5th Vilnius Rifle Regiment's 3rd Battalion was formed.

From 21 January 1919, the regiment was assigned to the so-called Lithuanian Rifle Division and was itself renamed the 7th Lithuanian Red Rifle Regiment.

Locations mentioned in this article in connection with the regiment

Furthest reach before defeat in the Battle of Jieznas in early Feb. 1919

=== Spring ===
On February 7, the regiment occupied Aukštadvaris and Stakliškės. On February 8, it occupied Jieznas and Butrimonys. However, the Lithuanian Army's 1st Infantry Regiment soon defeated the regiment at the Battle of Jieznas. Later the 7th Rifle Regiment fought in the Butrimonys–Aukštadvaris–Semeliškės section until April 23.

On April 29–30, 1919, the 7th Rifle Regiment, together with other Red Army units, unsuccessfully tried to regain Vilnius occupied by the Polish army. The 7th Regiment later fought in the vicinity of Utena.

=== Summer ===
On July 11, it was reorganized into the 30th Rifle Regiment. On July 26–August 25 it was stationed in Zarasai, from where it was forced out during the Lithuanian Zarasai offensive. The 7th Rifle Regiment withdrew to Soviet-occupied Latvia.

== Commanders ==
Commanders:

- M. Shaitanov (1918 July – November 26),
- A. Zenkevičius (1918 November 26–1919 February 15),
- Aleksandras Ružancovas (1919 February 15 – April 23),
- later A. Jankauskas, J. Puzinas, A. Zabaronokas.

== Sources ==
- Vaitkevičius, Bronius (2018-09-21). "Vilniaus penktasis šaulių pulkas". Visuotinė lietuvių enciklopedija (in Lithuanian).
- Rezmer, Waldemar (2010-12-01). "Walki o Wilno w styczniu 1919 roku – początek wojny polsko-sowieckiej". Europa Orientalis. Studia z Dziejów Europy Wschodniej i Państw Bałtyckich. (in Polish). 2. doi:10.12775/eo.2010.003. ISSN 2081-8742.
- Mockienė, Jurgita (2008-06-30). "Lietuvos reikalų komisariatas". Visuotinė lietuvių enciklopedija (in Lithuanian).
