= 6th Infantry Regiment (Lithuania) =

Former Lithuanian Army formation (1919–26; 1934–40)

The 6th Infantry Regiment (Lithuanian: 6-asis pėstininkų pulkas), later the 6th Infantry Regiment of the Duke of Pilėnai Margiris (Lithuanian: 6-asis pėstininkų Pilėnų Kunigaikščio Margio pulkas) was an infantry regiment that served in the Lithuanian Army during the Interwar period.

== History ==
The regiment was founded on 20 June 1919.

According to some, the regiment's date of establishment is considered to be 5 December 1918, when the order approving the formation of the 2nd Infantry Regiment was issued, as the 6th Regiment was formed from the 2nd Regiment's 1st Battalion. The regiment's soldiers fought against the Red Army from January to June in 1919: at Jieznas ( 10–13 February), Žiežmariai, Subačius. In June, the battalion was renamed to the Separate Marijampolė Battalion. It took part in the battles against the Bolsheviks, forcing them to retreat beyond the Daugava. On 6 October, the Marijampolė Battalion was sent to Šeduva to fight the Bermontians. Later, the battalion, named the 6th Infantry Regiment, was dislocated in Kėdainiai. On 20 November 1920, the battalion was given the name of the 6th Infantry Regiment of the Duke of Pilėnai Margiris.

In 1920, the regiment partook in battles against the Polish army, where the regiment was divided into smaller military units, frequently fighting as a part of various formations. At the end of the military operations, the regiment was deployed in Alytus, and disbanded on 31 August 1926 when military forces were being reduced.

In 1934, when the regiment was re-established, the nucleus was one of the 7th Regiment's battalions. In 1939, the 6th Infantry Regiment had two battalions, totalling 1,300 soldiers.

In the flag given to the regiment in 1937, the inscription was "Tau, tėvų žeme" (For you, the Land of my Fathers). In 1939 March, after the German occupation of the Klaipėda region, the regiment moved to Plungė, while its 2nd Battalion was deployed in Telšiai. It was part of the 3rd Infantry Division.

== Regiment commanders ==
- 1919 – Jurgis Butkus
- 1925-1926 – Colonel Kazys Sprangauskas
- 1934 – General Staff Colonel Juozas Lanskoronskis
- 1937 – Colonel Jonas Andrašūnas
- 1937 – Colonel Antanas Breimelis
- 1939 – Colonel Jonas Andrašiūnas
- 1940 – Lieutenant colonel Balsys Namajuška

== Sources ==
=== Books ===
- Lesčius, Vytautas (2004). Lietuvos Kariuomenė Nepriklausomybės Kovose 1918–1920 (PDF) (in Lithuanian). Vilnius: Generolo Jono Žemaičio Lietuvos karo akademija. ISBN 9955-423-23-4.
- Surgailis, Gintautas (2019). Šeštasis pėstininkų Pilėnų kunigaikščio Margio pulkas. Lietuvos kariuomenės istorija (in Lithuanian). Vilnius: Generolo Jono Žemaičio Lietuvos karo akademija. ISBN 978-609-8074-79-6.
- Ruzgas, Vincas, ed. (1932). "VIII. Krašto apsauga". Visa Lietuva: Informacinė knyga 1931 m. (in Lithuanian). Kaunas: Spaudos Fondas.
