= Battle of Jieznas =

- Part of Lithuanian–Soviet War
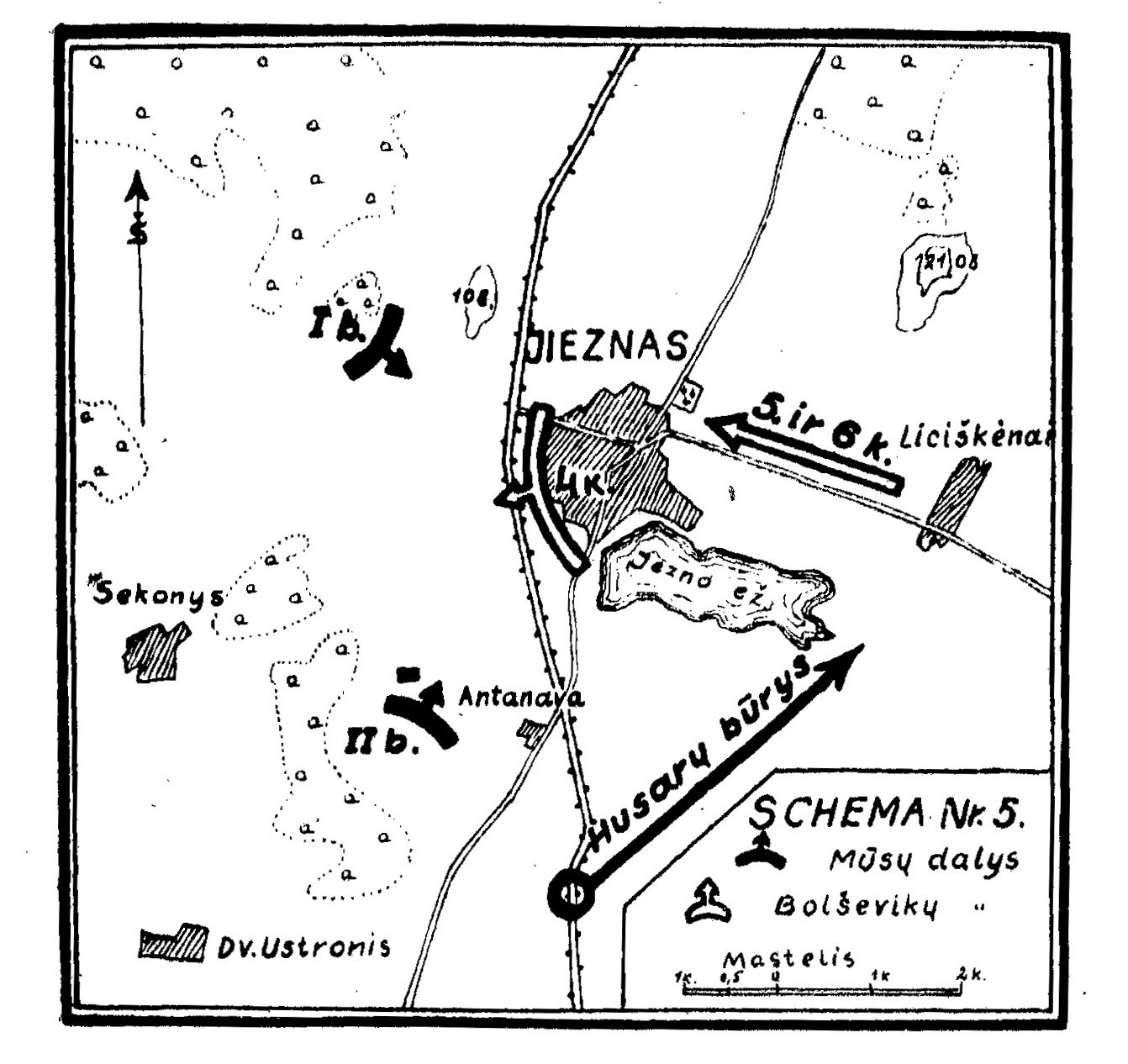
- Schematic diagram of the battle of Jieznas
Date	10–13 February 1919
Location	Jieznas, Lithuania
Result	Lithuanian victory

Belligerents
Russian SFSR	Lithuania

Units involved
February 10: 7th Red Rifle Regiment; (3 companies); February 13: 7th RRR; (6 coys, 14 machine guns)	February 10: 1st Infantry Regiment; (2nd Company); February 13: 1st IR (2 coys), Hussar platoon, 2 Saxon coys

Strength
(Russian Soviet Federative Socialist Republic) 600	(Lithuania) 200

Casualties and losses
~500 dead, wounded or missing 4 machine guns 50 rifles 2 field kitchens	18 killed 14 missing 7 wounded 33 captured

The Battle of Jieznas (Lithuanian: Jiezno kautynės; 10–13 February 1919) was one of the first battles of the recreated Lithuanian Army against the Red Army near Jieznas during the Lithuanian Wars of Independence. This Lithuanian victory contributed significantly to an increase in Lithuanian morale. The further Bolshevik offensive into Lithuania was stopped at the battles of Kėdainiai, Jieznas and Alytus.

== Background ==
After having occupied Vilnius, as part of the Soviet westward offensive of 1918–1919, the Soviet Pskov Rifle Division, composed of seven infantry regiments, artillery and small cavalry units, began the attack on Kaunas in February 1919 in order to end the existence of an independent Lithuania. The Red Army's command planned to occupy Kaunas with a pincer movement, by attacking it simultaneously through the north (via Kėdainiai) and the south (via Alytus and Jieznas).

The 600-man strong 7th Red Rifle Regiment, part of the southern group of Red Army units, had to march to Kaunas through Aukštadvaris, Jieznas, Birštonas, Prienai and Garliava, because this direction was weakly defended by Lithuanians. The Red Army's 7th Rifle Regiment contained some Lithuanians within its ranks. The other part of the southern group was supposed to attack Kaunas from the south through Alytus. However, due to the snow, poor infrastructure and lack of organization, parts of the Pskov division began attacking at different times. Also, the Bolsheviks expected weak resistance from the Lithuanians and they thought that the Germans would not resist at all as before and would simply retreat to Germany.

After receiving intelligence about the Red Army's plans, the Lithuanian military command sent a company of the 2nd Infantry Regiment led by Stasys Zaskevičius and a platoon of cavalry, about 30 soldiers, from Kaunas towards Prienai. The company reached Prienai on February 9 and immediately left for Birštonas. By February 9, the Red Army was already present in Jieznas' surroundings and had concentrated its forces in the neighboring village of Liciškėnai.

== Battle ==
=== First Lithuanian attack ===
On February 10, the 7th Rifle Regiment occupied Jieznas. That same day, early in the morning, the Lithuanian company, with the strength of roughly 200 men, left Birštonas in the direction of Jieznas. It approached with the cover of the banks and bushes of the Verknė stream. After learning that the enemy was in the Sokonys village, very close to Jieznas, the company received an order to attack the Bolsheviks and liberate the town.

Having received the order to liberate Jieznas, the Lithuanian infantry, divided into two parts, began attacking from the west and south on February 11 around 12:30, and the cavalry from the east. The 1st platoon attacked Jieznas from the west, the 2nd platoon from the south and the cavalry platoon from the east.

The defending Soviet forces were stronger. The attack failed because the 1st platoon's commander, the Russian Cietuchin, told the soldiers not to shoot, ordered them to surrender, led some of the soldiers into Russian captivity and surrendered himself. The 2nd platoon had approached the town of Jieznas, fought, but was forced to retreat. About 18 wounded soldiers were captured, mostly due to Cietuchin's treacherous actions, and later they were killed by the Red Army. The company, now reduced to 120 men, retreated to Birštonas and stopped in order to guard the road to Prienai.

On the way, the Lithuanian company met Lithuanian and German reinforcements. So, by February 11, more forces, both Lithuanian and German, had arrived in Prienai. On February 11, reinforcements arrived from Alytus to Prienai: a company of the 1st Infantry Regiment, led by officer Žemaitis, which had come from Alytus, and two companies of Saxon volunteer infantry with heavy machine guns and two artillery guns. The Germans, led by Hauptmann Heeger, were from the 46th Landwehr Division.

=== Second Lithuanian attack ===
On February 13, Lithuanian soldiers together with the Germans attacked Jieznas according to a jointly prepared plan. The plan of the attack remained the same, except there were more forces and no traitors on the Lithuanian side. A unit of Saxon volunteer mounted scouts was to attack from the north. The town of Jieznas was encircled, the Bolsheviks were beaten and forced to flee. The Soviet 7th Rifle Regiment's remnants retreated to Aukštadvariai and Jieznas was liberated from the Communists.

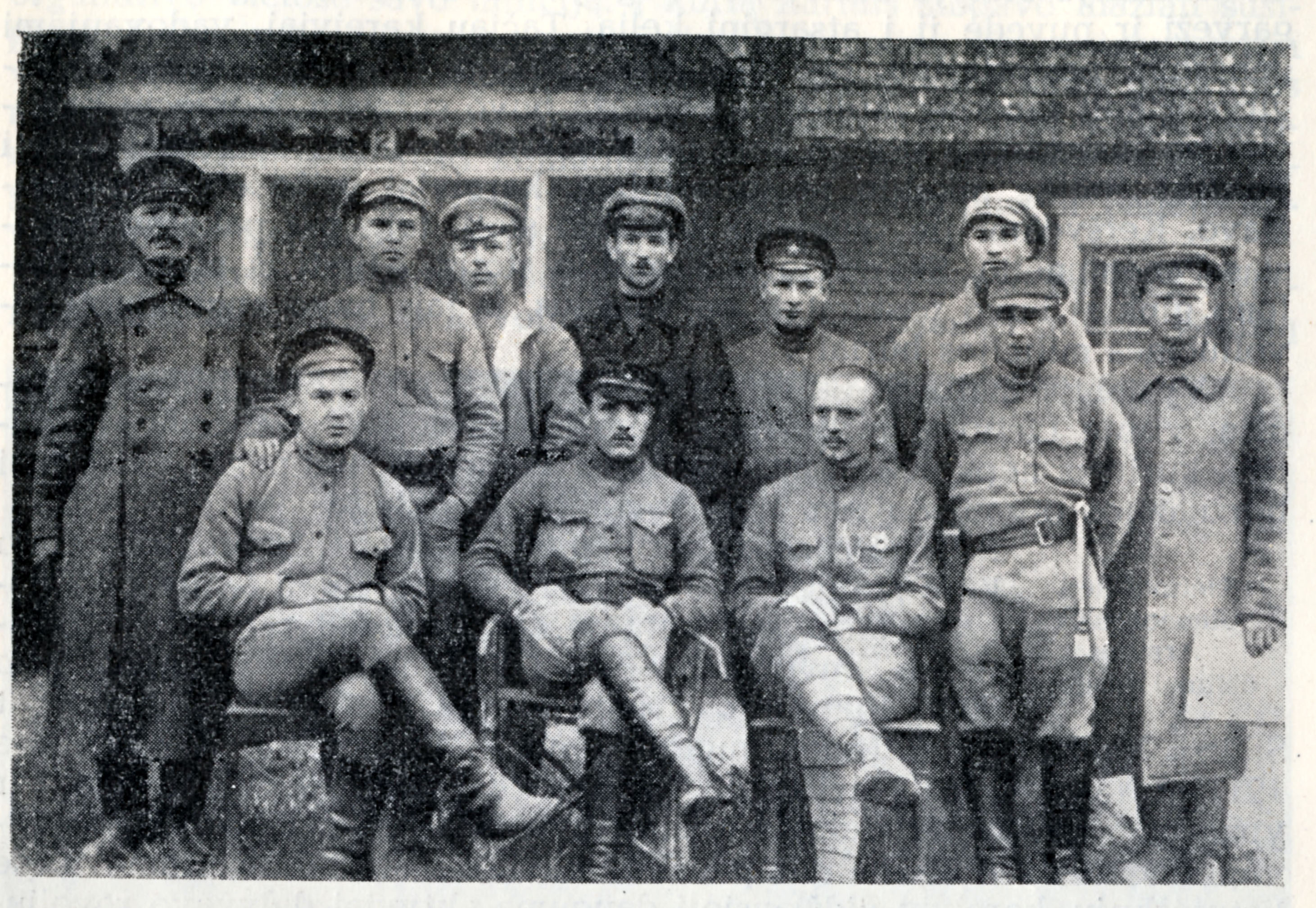
The 7th Rifle Regiment's soldiers, which participated in the battle for Jieznas. Photograph from 1919.

== Aftermath ==
The Red Army's attempt to capture Kaunas by attacking from the south across the Jieznas began to falter, and was finally defeated during the Battle of Alytus on 12–15 February 1919.

The Lithuanians captured 4 machine guns, about 50 rifles, a large booty of ammunition and the flag of the Red Army's 7th Rifle Proletarian Red Regiment. The dead Lithuanian soldiers, mainly those who were wounded after being captured by the Bolsheviks and brutally tortured, were buried in the cemetery of Jieznas. Later, a monument was built for them.

By February 14–15, Bolshevik invaders were expelled from Punia, Butrimonys and Stakliškės and they no longer attacked in this direction.

== Sources ==
- Ališauskas, Kazys (1956). "J. kautynės". In Girnius, Juozas (ed.). Lietuvių enciklopedija (in Lithuanian). Boston.
- Ališauskas, Kazys (1958). "Lietuvos kariuomenė" (PDF). Karys (in Lithuanian). 9 (1346).
- Beržinis, A. (1966). "Štai tie, kurie stengėsi Lietuvą pasmaugti 1919 m." Karys (in Lithuanian).
- Butkus, Stasys (1929). Savanoris, 1918-1920: Lietuvos kariuomenės kūrėjų-savanorių knyga (in Lithuanian). Kaunas: Lietuvos Kariuomenės Savanorių Sąjungos Centro Valdyba.
- Lesčius, Vytautas (2004). "Jiezno kautynės". Lietuvos Kariuomenė Nepriklausomybės Kovose 1918-1920 (in Lithuanian). Vilnius. pp. 47–52. ISBN 9955-423-23-4.
- Matusevičius, Juozas (2000). "Kėdainių, Jiezno ir Alytaus kautynių reikšmė užkertant kelią bolševikų įsiveržimui į Kauną". Karo Archyvas (in Lithuanian). 16 (1): 92–119. doi:10.47459/ka.2000.16.5. S2CID 240240424.
- Mockienė, Jurgita (2018-11-21). "Jiezno kautynės". vle.lt (in Lithuanian).
