= 4th Infantry Regiment (Lithuania) =

Former Lithuanian Army formation (1918–40)

4th Infantry Regiment of the Lithuanian King Mindaugas
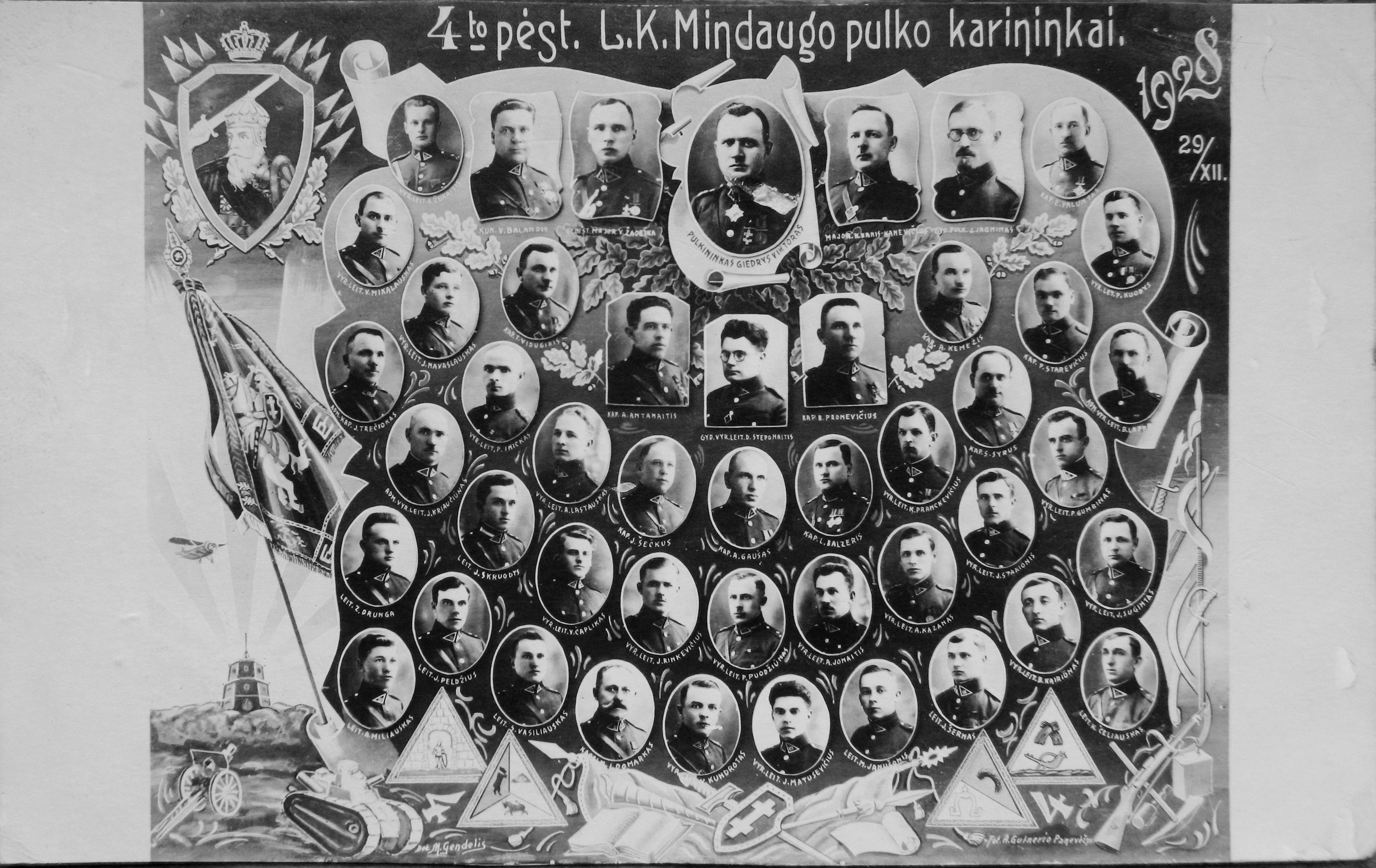
- Regiment's officers in 1928
- Active: 29 December 1918–30 August 1940
- Country: Lithuania
- Branch: Lithuanian Army
- Type: Infantry
- Part of: 1st Division
- Garrison/HQ: Mostly Panevėžys, some subunits in Kupiškis and Ukmergė
- Engagements: Lithuanian Wars of Independence (1919–1920); Lithuanian–Soviet War (Spring 1919); War against Bermontians (Autumn 1919); Polish-Lithuanian War (Summer 1920); Żeligowski's Mutiny (Autumn 1920)

4th Infantry Regiment, later the 4th Infantry Regiment of the Lithuanian King Mindaugas (Lithuanian: Ketvirtasis pėstininkų Lietuvos Karaliaus Mindaugo pulkas) was a Lithuanian Army infantry regiment that existed from 1918 to 1940 and was located in Panevėžys.

== Formation ==
The regiment was founded on 29 December 1918, when the Defence Ministry of the Lithuanian Republic allowed the officer Jonas Variakojis to assemble and command the Panevėžys Region Defence Unit (Lithuanian: Panevėžio srities apsaugos būrys). On 5 January 1919, Variakojis managed to salvage 70 rifles out of the retreating German Army and by 7 January, his unit received its first order. From 22 March, the unit is known as the Separate Panevėžys Battalion (Lithuanian: Panevėžio atskirasis batalionas) and from 20 June 1919 as the Panevėžys Battalion (Lithuanian: Panevėžio batalionas).

== Lithuanian Wars of Independence ==
The military formation was fighting the invading Bolsheviks from its foundation, specifically near Panevėžys, Kėdainiai and Ukmergė. On 18-23 May 1919, the regiment took part in the Kurkliai-Panevėžys operation, although it did not succeed in defending Panevėžys. Much more successful was the soon after Kupiškis-Utena operation from 26 May to 3 June, during which Kupiškis, Rokiškis and Alūkšta were liberated. The regiment pushed the Bolsheviks beyond the Daugava river.

From 15 October 1919, the regiment fought the Bermontians.

For its victorious battles, the Šiauliai town gave the unit a flag on 1 November 1919, the same day the unit was called the 4th Infantry Regiment of the Lithuanian King Mindaugas.

On 26 July 1920, the regiment entered Vilnius and defended it against Polish attacks in the start of October, later engaging them in the Musninkai-Širvintos sector, later partaking in the Battle of Giedraičiai. During the Lithuanian Wars of Independence, 3 officers and 72 soldiers of the regiment were killed in action, while 121 soldiers were wounded in combat. Order of the Cross of Vytis was accorded to 33 officers and 198 soldiers of the regiment.

== Interwar ==
In 1922, the regiment was moved to Panevėžys. In 1926, it was given the flag of the 3rd Class Order of the Cross of Vytis with the inscription: "God, help us defend the Fatherland's liberty and honour". The regiment was part of the 1st Lithuanian Infantry Division, whose subunits were sometimes located in Kupiškis ir Ukmergė.

== Soviet Occupation ==
With the Soviet Occupation of Lithuania, the regiment was renamed as the "4th Infantry Regiment" on 25 July 1940 and disbanded on 30 August 1940. On the disbanded regiment's basis, the Red Army's 215th Rifle Regiment was formed on 9 September 1940.

== Regiment's commanders ==
- 1919 Officer Jonas Variakojis
- 1919 Colonel Maksimas Katchė
- 1921 Colonel Pranas Tamašauskas
- 1927 General Headquarters Colonel Viktoras Giedrys
- Colonel Kazys Tallat-Kelpša
- 1931 General Headquarters Colonel Vaclovas Griganavičius
- 1935 Colonel Kazys Sprangauskas
- 1936 Colonel Vaclovas Žadeika
- 1940 Colonel Petras Genys
- 1940 Colonel Antanas Šurkus

== Sources ==
=== Books ===
- Lesčius, Vytautas (2004). Lietuvos Kariuomenė Nepriklausomybės Kovose 1918–1920 (PDF) (in Lithuanian). Vilnius: Generolo Jono Žemaičio Lietuvos karo akademija. ISBN 9955-423-23-4.
- Surgailis, Gintautas (2016). Ketvirtasis pėstininkų Lietuvos karaliaus Mindaugo pulkas (in Lithuanian). Vilnius: Generolo Jono Žemaičio Lietuvos karo akademija. ISBN 9786098074505.
- Liekis, A. (2002). Lietuvių karyba ir ginkluotė (in Lithuanian).
- Ruzgas, Vincas, ed. (1932). "VIII. Krašto apsauga". Visa Lietuva: Informacinė knyga 1931 m. (in Lithuanian). Kaunas: Spaudos Fondas.

=== Encyclopedias ===
- Vaičenonis, Jonas (19 May 2021). "Ketvirtasis pėstininkų pulkas". Visuotinė lietuvių enciklopedija (in Lithuanian).

=== Other ===
- Sakalauskas, Tomas (16 July 2020). "LIETUVOS CENTRINIS VALSTYBĖS ARCHYVAS – PAŽYMA APIE 4-OJO PĖSTININKŲ LIETUVOS KARALIAUS MINDAUGO PULKO FONDĄ NR. 517". www.archyvai.lt (in Lithuanian).
