= 2nd Infantry Regiment (Lithuania) =

Former Lithuanian Army formation (1918–40)

2nd Infantry Regiment of the Lithuanian Grand Duke Algirdas
- Active: December 5, 1918–September 1, 1940
- Country: Lithuania
- Branch: Lithuanian Army
- Type: Infantry
- Part of: 2nd Division
- Garrison/HQ: Šančiai (in Kaunas), Jonava
- Engagements: Lithuanian Wars of Independence (1918-1920): Lithuanian-Soviet War (Spring - Autumn 1919); War against Bermontians (Autumn 1919); Polish-Lithuanian War (Summer and Autumn 1920)

2nd Infantry Regiment later known as the 2nd Infantry Regiment of the Lithuanian Grand Duke Algirdas (Lithuanian: Antrasis pėstininkų Lietuvos Didžiojo Kunigaikščio Algirdo pulkas) was a Lithuanian Army infantry regiment that saw combat in the Lithuanian Wars of Independence. It existed from 1918 to 1940. The current Lithuanian arm's Grand Duke Algirdas Mechanised Infantry Battalion continues the 2nd Regiment's traditions.

== Formation ==
The regiment began forming on 5 December 1918. However, the Red Army was approaching from the east, so the core of the regiment, composed of the pulkininkas Vincas Grigaliūnas-Glovackis, three officers, and two soldiers, transferred from Vilnius to Kaunas and established itself in three rooms of the hotel "Europa". The German Army, still present in Lithuania, hindered the formation of the regiment, but the regiment was still granted the barracks in the Upper Panemunė. The regiment's officers travelled through Suvalkija and recruited volunteers. In early February 1919, the regiment had 50 officers and 1,262 soldiers, but there was only 420 rifles and no machine-gun. There was no military clothing, the volunteers received only a uniform cap, but still wore civilian clothes and were fed poorly.

The training of volunteers was short and were quickly pressed into action, as the Bolsheviks was already threatening the temporary capital, Kaunas.

== Lithuanian Wars of Independence ==
=== Lithuanian–Soviet War ===
The Soviet forces were approaching Kaunas from Prienai, thus 200 of the 2nd regiment's soldiers were sent to the front and fought in the battle of Jieznas. The first fights were unsuccessful due to the lack of force and experience. During the fight, one officer of the regiment, Cietuchin betrayed the regiment and led a squad of 33 men directly to enemy. The fight resulted in heavy casualties: 18 dead and 33 captured. Nevertheless, after a few days and after receiving reinforcements, the infantry took Jieznas back and halted the southern force of the Bolshevik offensive's pincer movement.

From May to September 1919, the regiment was part of the Panevėžys Group which fought the Red Army near Žasliai, Kėdainiai, Ramygala, Obeliai. In these fights, the regiment had 3 battalions with 63 officers, nearly 2,000 men and 20 machine guns.

The Battle of Panevėžys was very fierce and had to be liberated twice - on 19 and 21 May. Especially fierce fights raged in Kupiškis. The regiment's fights in Latvia were hard, due to an inconsistent supply and a dropping morale. Nonetheless, when the fights ended in September, the Bolsheviks were driven out of Lithuania.

=== Polish–Lithuanian War ===
In 1920 the regiment unsuccessfully fought against invading Polish forces near Seinai and Giedraičiai.

During the totality of the Lithuanian Wars of Independence, 11 officers and 111 men fell on the battlefield.

== Interwar ==
The regiment garrisoned Šančiai (an eldership in Kaunas) and Jonava. In 1926 July, the regiment was awarded 2nd class of the Order of Vytautas Cross with the inscription "Tėvynės meilė tebus mums vadovas" (English: Love of the Fatherland will be our guide).

== Soviet occupation ==
When the USSR occupied Lithuania, the regiment's name was removed on 25 July 1940. When the Lithuanian People's Army into the Red Army, the regiment was disbanded.

== Regiment's commanders ==
The regiment was commanded by:

- Pranas Liatukas (5–23 December 1918; 8 March – 4 May 1919)
- Vincas Grigaliūnas-Glovackis (acting 24 December 1918 – 4 March 1919; 4 May 1919 – 17 March 1920)
- Jonas Laurinaitis (17 March – 22 September 1920; 1 December 1920 – 15 November 1922)
- Kostas Valeiša (Voleišo) (acting 12 June – 13 August 1920 and 24 September – 2 October 1920)
- Jonas Petruitis (acting 15 November 1922 – 31 May 1926; 1 June 1926 – 19 October 1927)
- Bronius Ivanauskas (acting 20 October 1927 – 8 August 1928)
- Julius Čaplikas (21 December 1928 – 13 July 1934)
- Juozas Tumas (acting 8 August – 21 December 1928 and 13 July – 17 October 1934; 18 October 1934 – 25 June 1940)
- Antanas Špokevičius (27 June – 1 September 1940)

== Officers ==
- Petras Ciunis – Commander of the 2nd Company in 1939–1940.

== Sources ==
- Lesčius, Vytautas (2004). Lietuvos Kariuomenė Nepriklausomybės Kovose 1918–1920 (PDF) (in Lithuanian). Vilnius: Generolo Jono Žemaičio Lietuvos karo akademija. ISBN 9955-423-23-4.
- Surgailis, Gintautas (2014). Antrasis Lietuvos Didžiojo kunigaikščio Algirdo pėstininkų pulkas. Lietuvos kariuomenės istorija (in Lithuanian). Vilnius: Generolo Jono Žemaičio Lietuvos karo akademija. ISBN 9786098074291.

== See also ==
- http://www.archyvai.lt/lt/fondai/kariuomene/lcva_f514.html
- Ruzgas, Vincas, ed. (1932). Visa Lietuva (in Lithuanian). Kaunas: Spaudos Fondas.
