= Lithuanian–Soviet War =

Failed Soviet invasion of Lithuania (1918–1919)

- Part of Lithuanian Wars of Independence and Soviet westward offensive of 1918–1919
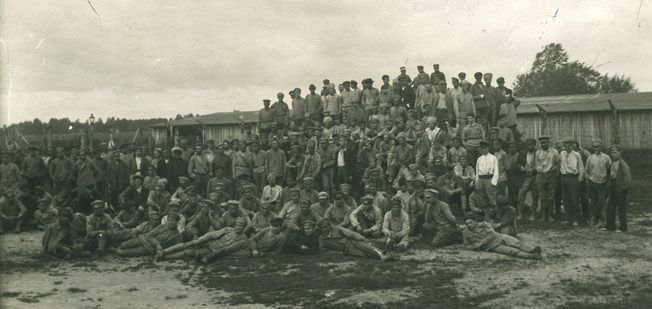
- Soviet prisoners of war in a Lithuanian camp. As of December 1, 1919, the Lithuanians held 1,773 Soviet prisoners.
Date	12 December 1918 – 31 August 1919 (8 months, 2 weeks and 5 days)
Location	Lithuania
Result	Lithuanian victory

Belligerents
Lithuania; Saxon Volunteers	Soviet Russia; (Socialist Soviet Republic of Lithuania and Belorussia) Lithuanian communists

Commanders and leaders
Mykolas Sleževičius; Silvestras Žukauskas	Vladimir Lenin; Jukums Vācietis; Dmitry Nadyozhny; Vincas Kapsukas

Strength
(Lithuania) 8,000 Lithuanians (August 1919) (Weimar Republic) 10,000 Germans	(Russian Soviet Federative Socialist Republic) 18,000–20,000

The Lithuanian–Soviet War or Lithuanian–Bolshevik War (Lithuanian: Lietuvos-Sovietų Rusijos karas) was fought between newly independent Lithuania and the Russian Socialist Federative Soviet Republic in the aftermath of World War I. It was part of the larger Soviet westward offensive of 1918–1919. The offensive followed the retreat of German troops and sought to establish Soviet republics in Ukraine, Belarus, Lithuania, Latvia, Estonia, and Poland, and to link up with the German Revolution. By the end of December 1918, Soviet forces reached Lithuanian borders. Largely unopposed, they occupied one town after another and by the end of January 1919, they controlled about two thirds of the Lithuanian territory. In February, the Soviet advance was stopped by Lithuanian and German volunteers, who prevented the Soviets from capturing Kaunas, the temporary capital of Lithuania. From April 1919, the Lithuanian war went parallel with the Polish–Soviet War. Poland had territorial claims over Lithuania, especially the Vilnius Region; these tensions spilt over into the Polish–Lithuanian War.

British-Polish historian Norman Davies summarized the situation: "the German army was supporting the Lithuanian nationalists, the Soviets were supporting the Lithuanian communists and the Polish Army was fighting them all." In mid-May, the Lithuanian army, now commanded by General Silvestras Žukauskas, began an offensive against the Soviets in Northeastern Lithuania. By mid-June, the Lithuanians reached the Latvian border and cornered the Soviets among lakes and hills near Zarasai, where the Soviets held out until the end of August 1919. The Soviets and Lithuanians, separated by the Daugava River, maintained their fronts until the Battle of Daugavpils in January 1920. As early as September 1919, the Soviets offered to negotiate a peace treaty, but talks began only in May 1920. The Soviet–Lithuanian Peace Treaty was signed on July 12, 1920. Soviet Russia fully recognized independent Lithuania.

== Background ==
Bolshevik forces advance following retreating German troops (red arrows). The red line shows the Soviet front in January 1919.

Lithuania became part of the Russian Empire after the final partition of the Polish–Lithuanian Commonwealth in 1795. During World War I, Lithuania was occupied by Germany and made part of Ober Ost. On February 16, 1918, the Council of Lithuania declared independence from both Germany and Russia. Three weeks later, the Bolsheviks, encumbered with the Russian Civil War, sued for peace with the Central Powers and signed the Treaty of Brest-Litovsk. They renounced Russian claims to Finland, Estonia, Latvia, Ukraine, Lithuania, and Poland. However, Germany granted the Lithuanians only minimal autonomy and they could not establish de facto independence. That changed when Germany lost the war and signed the Compiègne Armistice of 11 November 1918. Lithuania soon began organizing basic institutions and established its first government led by Augustinas Voldemaras.

On November 13, 1918, the Soviet Russian government renounced the Treaty of Brest-Litovsk, which had assured Lithuania's independence. The Bolshevik Western Army followed retreating German troops, maintaining a distance of 10–15 kilometres (6.2–9.3 mi) between the two armies. Demoralized Germans often left valuable armaments and other equipment to the Soviets. The Soviets attempted to spread the global proletarian revolution and sought to establish Soviet republics in the region. They saw Baltic states as a barrier or a bridge into Western Europe, where they could join the German and the Hungarian revolutions. By the end of December 1918, Bolshevik forces reached eastern Lithuania.

== Opposing sides ==
=== Lithuanian government ===
Augustinas Voldemaras, the first Prime Minister of Lithuania, did not believe that forming the military was a priority and advocated for Lithuanian neutrality. He trusted that German mercenaries would protect Lithuania until the upcoming Paris Peace Conference could establish peace. Residents organized local self-defense units to defend themselves from the retreating Germans. The first laws regarding the army were not issued until 23 November 1918. Some Lithuanians, who had served in the Russian army during the World War, returned to Lithuania and started organizing battalions in Kaunas, Gardinas, and Alytus. They lacked guns, ammunition, and officers.

At the end of December, with the Bolsheviks already in the country, Lithuania was left leaderless. Augustinas Voldemaras, Chairman of the Council of Lithuania Antanas Smetona, and Martynas Yčas, minister of finance, departed for Germany to ask for financial assistance. General Kiprijonas Kundratavičius, vice minister of defense, suggested a retreat to Gardinas and refused to command the Lithuanian defense. The first cabinet of ministers resigned on December 26, 1918. Mykolas Sleževičius stepped in and organized a new government. On December 29, he issued the first mass appeal in four languages calling for volunteers for the Lithuanian Army. Sleževičius' government adopted a new policy on land reform, which could be summarized in a slogan "land for those who cultivate it." It meant the land would be taken from large landowners and redistributed first to the volunteers for free and then to small peasants for a fee. Mobilization of officers was announced only on January 25; about 400 people responded.

=== Saxon volunteers ===
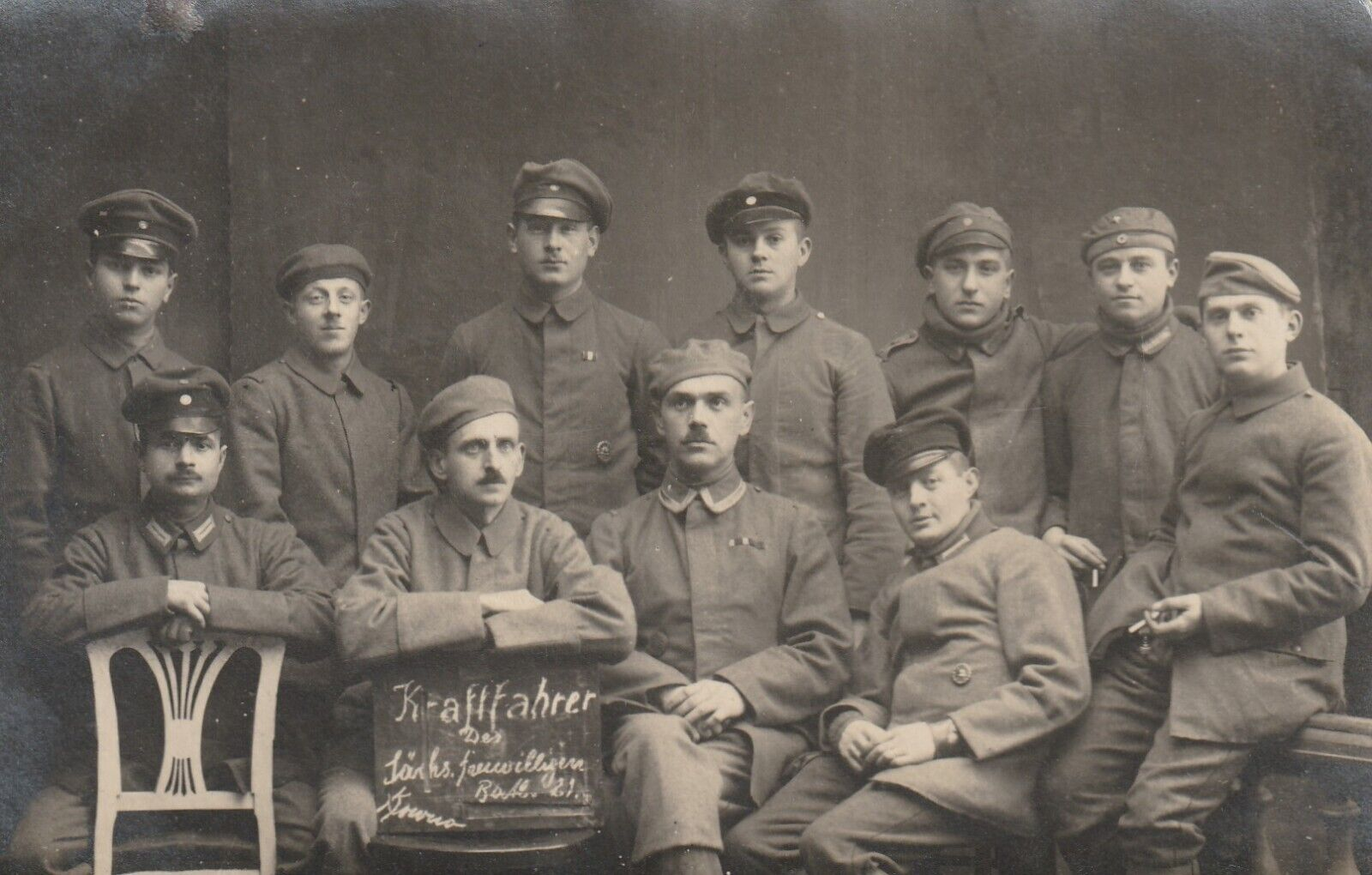
Saxon volunteers. 18th regiment, 21st battalion. Kaunas, 23 January 1919.

In Berlin, Smetona and Yčas signed a loan agreement with Germany for 100 million marks. The money was used primarily to build and supply the army. They further negotiated direct German support in the war against the Soviets. Article 12 of the Compiègne Armistice required the Germans to protect Lithuania from possible Soviet attacks, but Germany was also interested in maintaining its influence in the region and weakening Russia. At first, they tried to organize volunteers from the retreating soldiers of the 10th German Army, commanded by General Erich von Falkenhayn. However, the soldiers were tired and demoralized and wanted to return home as soon as possible. Recruitment continued in Germany, especially in Saxony. The volunteers were paid 30 marks per month plus 5 marks per day and had to sign up for three months. The first Saxon volunteers, as they became known, arrived in Kaunas at the beginning of January, but quite a few of them were judged unfit for duty and sent back. By the end of January, German volunteers numbered 4,000. They were unreliable, as the German Revolution increased the popularity of the Spartacus League and Soviet causes. There were several attempts at a coup against the Lithuanian government. These volunteers were stationed in and around Kaunas: Alytus, Jonava, Kėdainiai, and Baisogala.

At first, they were organized into the 46th Saxon Volunteer Division. On February 22, Lieutenant-General Walter von Eberhardt became its commander. In April–May, German forces were reorganized into the South Lithuania Volunteer Brigade, composed of three regiments, (18th, 19th, and 20th) and a separate battalion in Raseiniai. The 18th Regiment fought alongside Lithuanians; the 19th Regiment guarded the Kaunas area and did not participate in battle; the 20th Regiment was stationed in Gardinas and then in Kėdainiai; the separate battalion joined the Bermontians. The Baltische Landeswehr, led by General Rüdiger von der Goltz, organized a coup against the Latvian government and captured Riga. On May 23, the Paris Peace Conference, reacting to these events, asked Germany to withdraw its troops from both Latvia and Lithuania as soon as local forces could defend themselves. The last Saxon Volunteers left Lithuania in mid-July.

=== Soviet government ===
On 8 December 1918, a revolutionary government was formed from members of the Communist Party of Lithuania, chaired by Vincas Mickevičius-Kapsukas. On December 16, the revolutionary government declared the establishment of the Lithuanian Soviet Socialist Republic. Between 31 December 1918 and 1 January 1919, the German garrison withdrew from Vilnius and passed authority over the city to a local Polish committee, against the pleas of the Lithuanian administration. The Lithuanian and Belarusian Self-Defence, which aligned itself with Poland, took over the posts. The Lithuanian government withdrew to Kaunas, the temporary capital of Lithuania. On January 5, 1919, Vilnius was taken by the Soviets after a five-day fight with Polish paramilitary platoons led by general Władysław Wejtko. Kapsukas and his government arrived in Vilnius from Daugavpils on January 7. On February 27, the Lithuanian SSR was incorporated into the Socialist Soviet Republic of Lithuania and Belorussia or Litbel.

In the occupied territory, the Soviets created revolutionary committees and soviets based on structures developed in Russia. Unlike elsewhere, Lithuanian communist organizations were young and had not yet developed a network of supporting local councils. They nationalized commercial institutions and large estates. The land was to be used for collective farming instead of being redistributed to small farmers. The Soviet propagated internationalism and atheism in a country of staunch Catholics and determined nationalists. Soviets were supported by the industrial working class, but it was too small in Lithuania. The Soviets demanded large war contributions from captured cities and villages. For example, Panevėžys was required to pay 1,000,000, Utena – 200,000, villagers – 10 rubles. Such policies alienated the local population and contributed to the eventual defeat of the Soviets. For example, in February, Kapsukas sent a telegram to Moscow arguing that conscription of local Lithuanians to the Red Army would only encourage Lithuanians to volunteer for the Lithuanian army.

== Soviet advance ==
=== Soviet military gains ===
Soviet troops (about 18,000 to 20,000 men) approached the Lithuanian territory on December 12, 1918. About 5,000 of them were Lithuanians. Three divisions were employed: Pskov Rifle Division (later renamed as the Lithuanian Division), International Division (later renamed as the 2nd Latvian Rifle Division; included 39th, 41st, 47th, and 60th Regiments), and 17th Division (later renamed as Western Division; included 5th Vilnius Rifle Regiment). The divisions did not have a common military commander. Later, more units were sent from Russia. The Soviets also recruited partisan groups behind the front lines. Soviet soldiers were poorly supplied and relied on requisitioning food, horses, and clothes from locals. Lithuania could not offer serious resistance as at the time its army consisted only of about 3,000 untrained volunteers. Only local partisans, armed with weapons acquired from retreating Germans, offered brief resistance.

Red Army captured one town after another: Zarasai and Švenčionys (Dec. 22), Utena (Dec. 23), Rokiškis and Vilnius (Jan. 5), Ukmergė and Panevėžys (Jan. 9), Šiauliai (Jan. 15), and Telšiai (Jan. 25). That accounted for about 2/3 of the Lithuanian territory. The front somewhat stabilized when Soviet forces were stopped near the Venta River by Latvian and German units (Baltische Landeswehr). Also, Germans slowed down the withdrawal of their troops after the Spartacist uprising was subdued on January 12. Southern Lithuania was a little better protected as Germans retreated from Ukraine through Gardinas. To prevent fights between retreating Germans and the Red Army, the Soviets and Germans signed a treaty on January 18. The treaty drew a temporary demarcation line that went through Daugai, Stakliškės, and 10 kilometres (6.2 mi) east of the Kaišiadorys–Jonava–Kėdainiai railway. That barred Bolshevik forces from directly attacking Kaunas, Lithuania's second-largest city. The Red Army would need to encircle Kaunas and attack through Alytus or Kėdainiai. The operation to take Kaunas began on February 7.

=== Encirclement of Kaunas ===
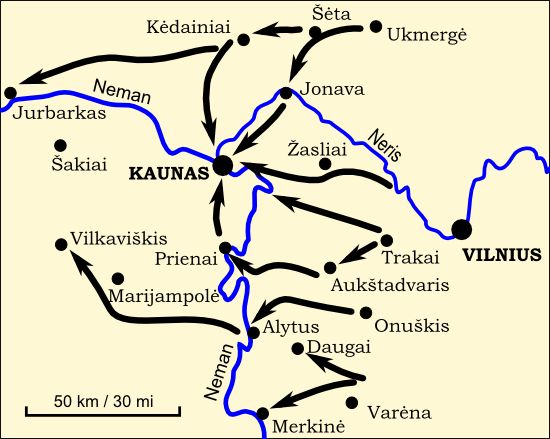
Planned Soviet attacks to encircle and capture Kaunas

Kėdainiai was attacked by the 2nd Rifle Regiment of the Lithuanian (former Pskov) Division (about 1,000 men). Lithuanian forces from Panevėžys, commanded by Jonas Variakojis, and from Kėdainiai numbered only about 200 men. Lithuanians withstood Red Army advance near Kėdainiai and with German support repelled it. On February 8, during the course of a reconnaissance mission, Povilas Lukšys became the first Lithuanian soldier to die in the war. On February 10, joint Lithuanian and German forces captured Šėta and forced the Red Army to retreat. The operation's success lifted the Lithuanian army's morale and prevented the Red Army from encircling Kaunas from the north.

On February 9, Soviet 7th Rifle Regiment (900 men) seized Jieznas, south of Kaunas. The battle of Jieznas lasted three days, and, after the setback of the betrayal by a Russian officer in Lithuanian service, Lithuanians, together with German support, ultimately won on February 13 and liberated Jieznas. The Soviets continued to push for Kaunas. The 3rd and 4th Rifle Regiments (about 2,000 men) attacked Alytus on February 12. Germans did not engage in battle and retreated; not yet fully formed Lithuanian 1st Infantry Regiment could not withstand pressure from the Red Army and had to retreat towards Marijampolė and Prienai. Antanas Juozapavičius, the first Lithuanian officer to die in the wars, was killed during this battle. On the night of February 14–15, German forces and one company of the Lithuanians returned to Alytus and once more liberated the city. Kaunas was defended and the front stabilized for a while. Soviets were ordered to abandon the offensive and maintain a defensive position. This break allowed Lithuanians to better organize and train the volunteers.

== Counteroffensive ==
=== German offensive ===
The advance of Polish (blue arrows), Lithuanian/German (dark purple arrows), Latvian/German (white arrows from the west), and Estonian/Latvian (white arrows from the north) forces. The blue line shows the Polish front in May 1920.

Northern Lithuania (Samogitia) was overtaken by the Soviet International Division (about 3,000 men). Its objective was to reach the Baltic Sea and cut off German supplies to Latvians in their war against the Soviets. Local communists were more active in northern Lithuania as the shortest route for Russian prisoners to return to Russia was through Samogitia. Their biggest achievement was forming a 1,000-man Samogitian Regiment, commanded by Feliksas Baltušis-Žemaitis, in the city of Šiauliai. The regiment included Russian POWs, German deserters, and criminals. There were no units of regular Lithuanian army in Samogitia except for partisans in Skuodas, rallied by Povilas Plechavičius and his brother Aleksandras, and in Joniškėlis.

The movement of the Bolsheviks towards East Prussia worried Germany, and they sent volunteers (Brigade Schaulen) commanded by General Rüdiger von der Goltz to free a section of the Libau–Romny Railway line linking Liepāja, Mažeikiai, Radviliškis, and Kėdainiai. It was part of a larger counter-offensive in Latvia. At the end of February, the Lithuanian partisans, supported by German artillery, liberated Mažeikiai and Seda, and pursued the Bolsheviks to Kuršėnai. On February 27, 1919, German volunteers, supported by Plechavičius' partisans and Joniškėlis' partisans, defeated the Samogitian Regiment in a battle near Luokė. The regiment disbanded. Before mid-March, the Germans took Kuršėnai, Šiauliai, Radviliškis, Šeduva, and Joniškis, and stopped. On a few occasions, they were aided by Lithuanian partisans and regular units. Joniškėlis' partisans continued to guard the front along the Mūša River. They were later incorporated into the regular Lithuanian military.

=== Lithuanian preparations ===
As the Soviet forces were stopped, the Lithuanian army slowly began preparing itself for an offensive. After the Battle of Kėdainiai, the Panevėžys volunteer regiment had secured its positions and grew in strength. Between mid-February and end of March, it carried out small expeditions into nearby towns. Their main purpose was to demoralize the enemy forces and boost the confidence of locals and Lithuanian volunteers. As a reward for its successful operations, the volunteer regiment was named the Separate Panevėžys Battalion (Lithuanian: Panevėžio atskirasis batalionas) on March 22. The demoralization campaign was successful; the Bolshevik forces stationed in Panevėžys and Kupiškis rebelled and were quelled only by a Red Army division from neighbouring Latvia. The Bolshevik morale underwent deeper declines and, between March 19 and March 24, their forces left Panevėžys. Lithuanian forces entered the city on March 26, but the Red Army retook it on April 4.

The lull between Soviet attacks was used to strengthen and organize the army. On March 5, Lithuanians announced the mobilization of men born in 1887–1889. Lithuanian forces rapidly increased their numbers. By May 3, the official headcount reached 440 officers and 10,729 privates. However, only about half of them were properly trained, armed, and assigned to military units. In February–April, Lithuanian soldiers were actively undergoing training, the chain of command was streamlined, and new military units were formed. Lithuania also received new shipments of arms and munitions. Soldiers received their first uniforms.

The first organized Lithuanian offensive was carried out on April 3–8, 1919. Lithuanians decided to take advantage of large Polish attacks against the Soviets in the area near Gardinas to test enemy strength and liberate Vilnius. The southern group, formed based on the 1st Infantry Regiment and led by Kazys Ladiga, was to attack from Alytus along the Daugai–Valkininkai line. The northern group, formed on the basis on the 2nd Infantry Regiment and led by Juozas Butkus, was to attack from Kaišiadorys along the Žasliai–Vievis line. Germans did not participate. Both regiments were initially successful, but the Soviets gathered their forces and stopped the advance. As Lithuanian flanks were not defended, they decided to abandon the offensive. Soviets also accused Germans of violating the demarcation line set on January 18 and pressured them to retreat.

=== Polish offensive ===
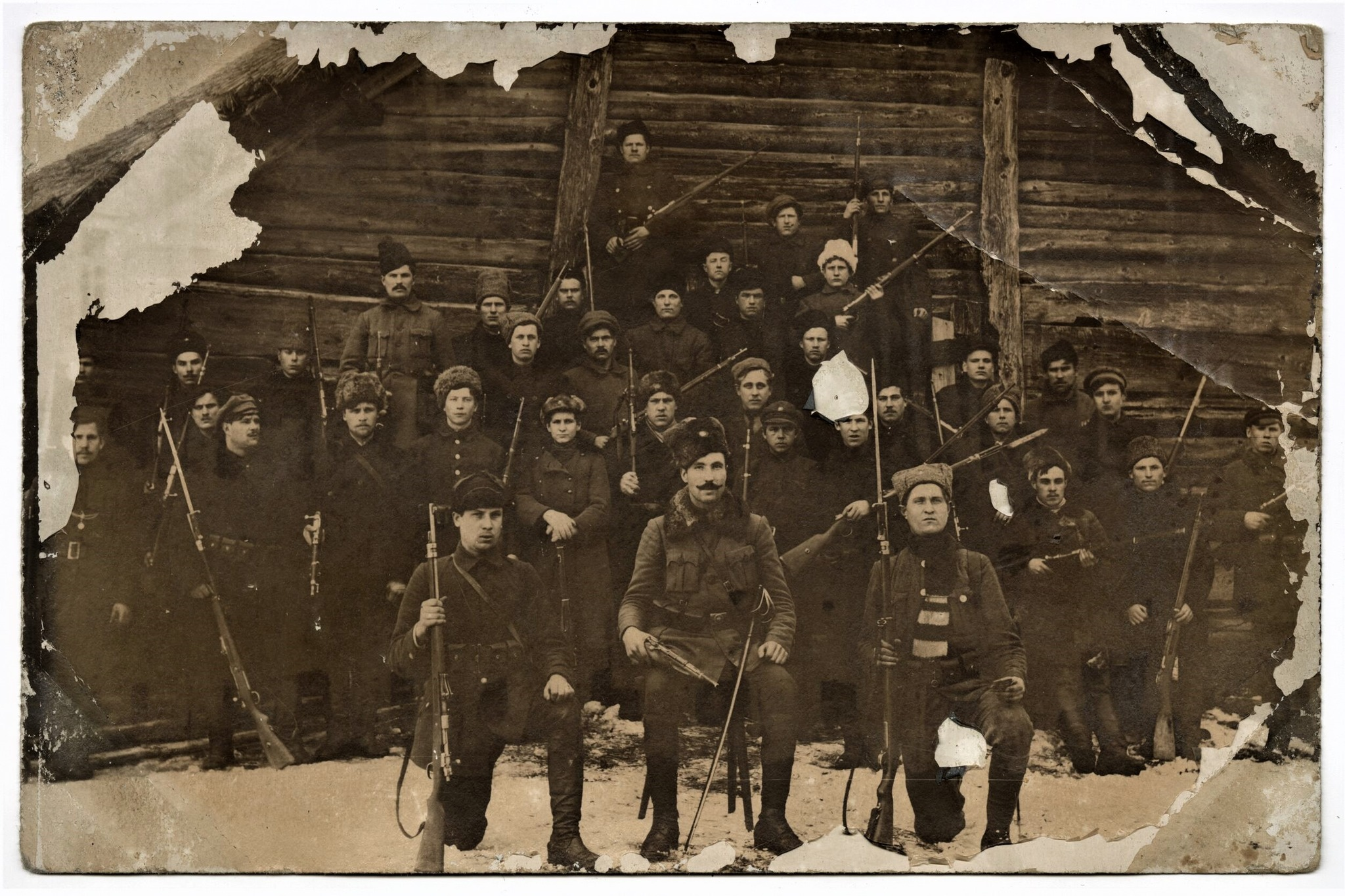
Lithuanian partisan riflemen, led by Petras Šiaudinis, who fought against the Polish military in Lithuania, 1920

Poland started an offensive against the Soviets in March 1919. They pushed east and north, entering the Vilnius Region, the territory claimed by Lithuanians. Between April 19 and 21, Poles captured Vilnius during the Vilna offensive, and by May, secured their positions. The Polish army forced the Soviets to withdraw their left wing from the territories south of the Neris River. This Polish advance significantly shortened the Lithuanian–Soviet front line and allowed Lithuania to concentrate its forces for operations in northeastern Lithuania. However, it also meant that a new front line with Poland was open. At first, both Poles and Lithuanians cooperated against the Soviets, but soon the cooperation gave way to increasing hostility. The first clashes between Polish and Lithuanian soldiers occurred on April 26 and May 8 near Vievis.

Poland did not recognize Lithuania, as its Chief of State Józef Piłsudski wanted a union with Lithuania in hopes of reviving the old Polish–Lithuanian Commonwealth (see Międzymorze federation). Poland justified its actions not only as part of a military campaign against the Soviets but also as the right of self-determination of local Poles, who formed a significant minority in eastern Lithuania. Lithuanians claimed Vilnius as their historical capital and opposed to any federation with Poland, desiring an independent national Lithuanian state. The Lithuanian government in Kaunas saw the Polish presence in Vilnius as an occupation. In addition to the Vilnius Region, the nearby Suwałki Region was also disputed. The Polish–Lithuanian relations were not immediately hostile but grew worse as each side refused to compromise.

=== Lithuanian offensive ===
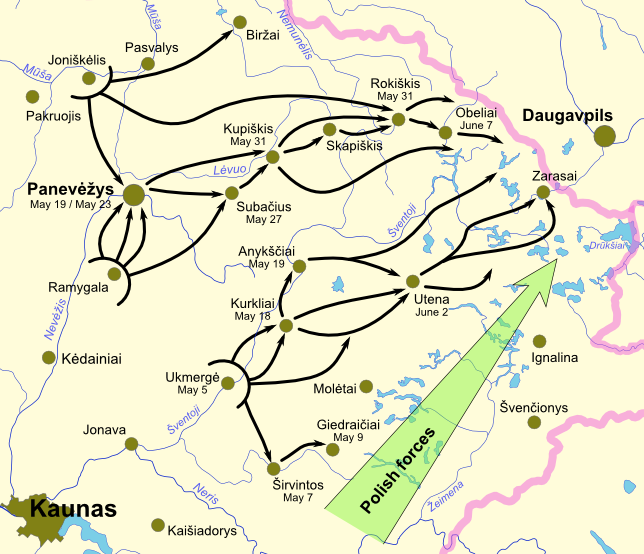
Lithuanian offensive May–June 1919. Dates indicate when the town was taken by Lithuanian forces. The pink line marks the border of Lithuania since 1990.

Polish advances against the Soviets necessitated changes in Lithuanian strategy. On April 26, General Silvestras Žukauskas, who just recovered from typhus, was designated Chief of the General Staff. He decided to mount an offensive in northeastern Lithuania. The first objective was to take over Ukmergė. On May 3, the Separate Panevėžys Volunteer Regiment, supported by the 18th Regiment of Saxon Volunteers, had secured the town. The operation was risky as, for a while, Kėdainiai was unprotected, opening a path to Kaunas, but it was also very successful; some 500 Soviet soldiers were taken prisoner and about 50 Poles, captured by the Soviets in the battles near Vilnius, were liberated and returned to Poland. On May 7, Lithuanians entered Širvintos, where they found Polish troops. Lithuanians and Poles mounted a joint operation to take Giedraičiai on May 9.

The Lithuanian army's chain of command was reformed. On May 7, General Žukauskas assumed command of the entire Lithuanian army and initiated a complete reorganization of the Lithuanian forces into two groups. The first brigade, stationed in Ukmergė, was called the Vilkmergė Group and included a battalion of Saxon Volunteers. Its first commander Kazys Ladiga was ordered to push along the Utena–Zarasai line. The second brigade, called the Panevėžys Group, was charged with capturing Panevėžys and then pushing along the Kupiškis–Rokiškis–Obeliai line. The group, initially commanded by Jonas Variakojis, was aided by Joniškėlis' partisans from the north. The Ministry of Defense and the General Staff were also reorganized.

On May 18, the reorganized army carried out its first operation. The Vilkmergė Group captured Kurkliai and Anykščiai. On May 22, the Group launched an attack on Utena. The initiative was met by a Soviet counterattack and the Lithuanian forces retreated. Further attacks were stopped for several days to wait for the results of the advance on Kupiškis. The drive towards Utena resumed on May 31, and the city was secured on June 2. The Panevėžys Group launched a drive towards Panevėžys on May 18 and secured the city the following day, but lost it to a Bolshevik counterattack, carried out on May 21. However, the Soviets left Panevėžys without a fight two days later. The Group charged towards Kupiškis and secured Subačius. On May 30, Joniškėlis' partisans broke through the Soviet lines and liberated Rokiškis in Soviet rear; Bolshevik forces, afraid that they could be encircled, left Kupiškis on the night of May 30–31, and Lithuania secured that city on June 1.

After Utena's liberation, Saxon Volunteers left the front, and by mid-July, they had departed Lithuania. However, Lithuanian advances continued and, on June 10, Lithuanian forces reached the territory controlled by Latvian partisans (Green Guard) and supplied them with munitions. On June 12, the Soviets counterattacked and Lithuanians were stopped. Another Soviet push came on June 20 and the front stabilized. The Soviets were cornered in a small region around Zarasai. Between July 6 and 12, Lithuanians, with some Latvian assistance, attempted to drive out the Bolsheviks. The Soviets gathered their forces from calmer fronts and forced Lithuanians to retreat to their former positions.

=== Polish–Lithuanian conflict ===
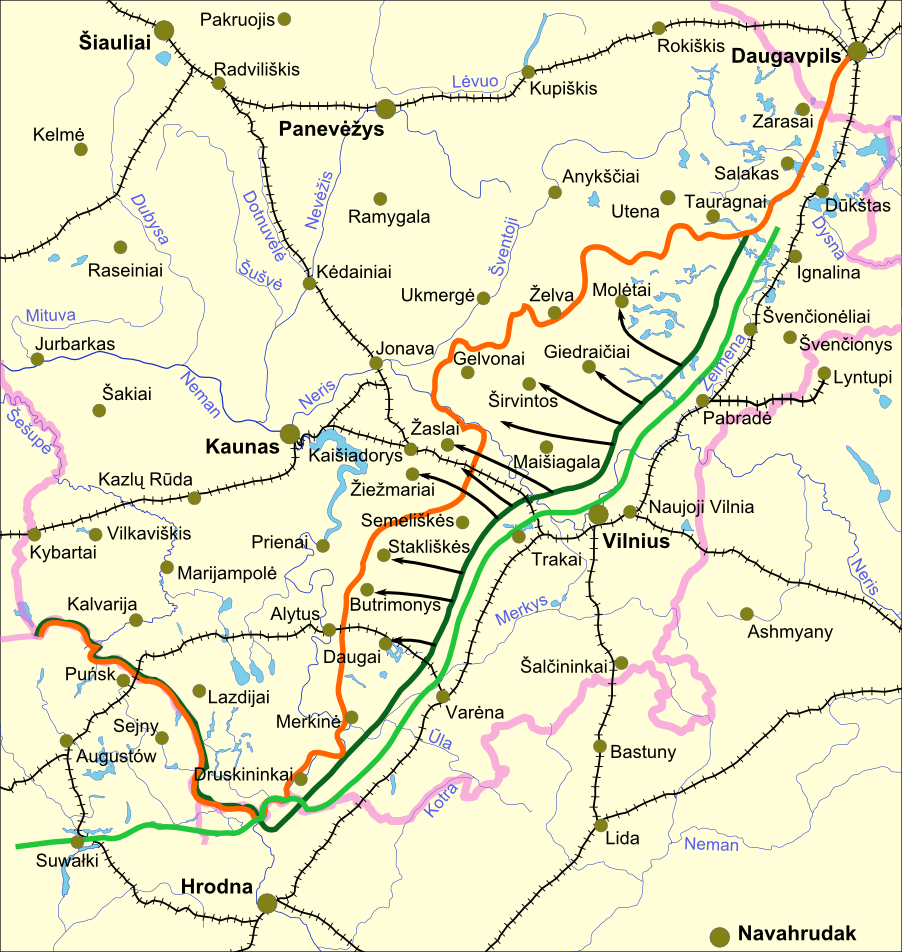
Map of demarcation lines of June 18 (light green) and July 26 (dark green) between Poland and Lithuania. Poland ignored both lines and continued to advance up to the orange line. Railroads are marked by black stitched lines.

While Lithuanian forces battled the Soviets in northeastern Lithuania, the tension between Poland and Lithuania grew. Direct negotiations between May 28 and June 11, 1919, collapsed as neither side was inclined to compromise. Trying to prevent a direct military conflict, the Allied Supreme Council drew the first demarcation line on June 18, 1919. The line was drawn several kilometres west of the Saint Petersburg–Warsaw railway. The Polish Ministry of Foreign Affairs rejected it as it required the Polish forces to retreat up to 30–35 km (19–22 mi); Lithuanians were discontent as well, as it left Vilnius and Gardinas under Polish control. As German volunteers were departing from Lithuania (their last units left Kaunas in mid-July), Poland mounted an offensive on 100 km (62 mi) wide front, moving 20–30 km (12–19 mi) deeper into the Lithuanian territory. Preoccupied with the Soviet threat, Lithuania could not organize an effective defence and the Entente intervened again by drawing the second demarcation line, known as the Foch Line, on July 26, 1919. Two major modifications were made: Suwałki Region was assigned to Poland and the entire line was moved about 7 km (4.3 mi) west. Neither Lithuanians, Poles, nor Germans (still present in the Suwałki Region) were content with the new demarcation line. Between July 29 and August 2, Polish troops attacked Lithuanians several times. On August 3, a Polish diplomatic mission in Kaunas declared that Poland has no plans to annex Lithuania and proposed a plebiscite in the contested territories, allowing local inhabitants to determine their future. When the Lithuanian government rejected the Polish proposal, Józef Piłsudski decided that further military action was not a solution. Instead, the Lithuanian government itself needed to be replaced by a party more willing to negotiate a compromise. The front stabilized, but bilateral relations worsened in the aftermath of the Sejny Uprising (August 23 – September 9) which, in turn, ruined the attempted coup d'état by the Polish Military Organisation against the Lithuanian government (August 28–29).

=== Final battles ===
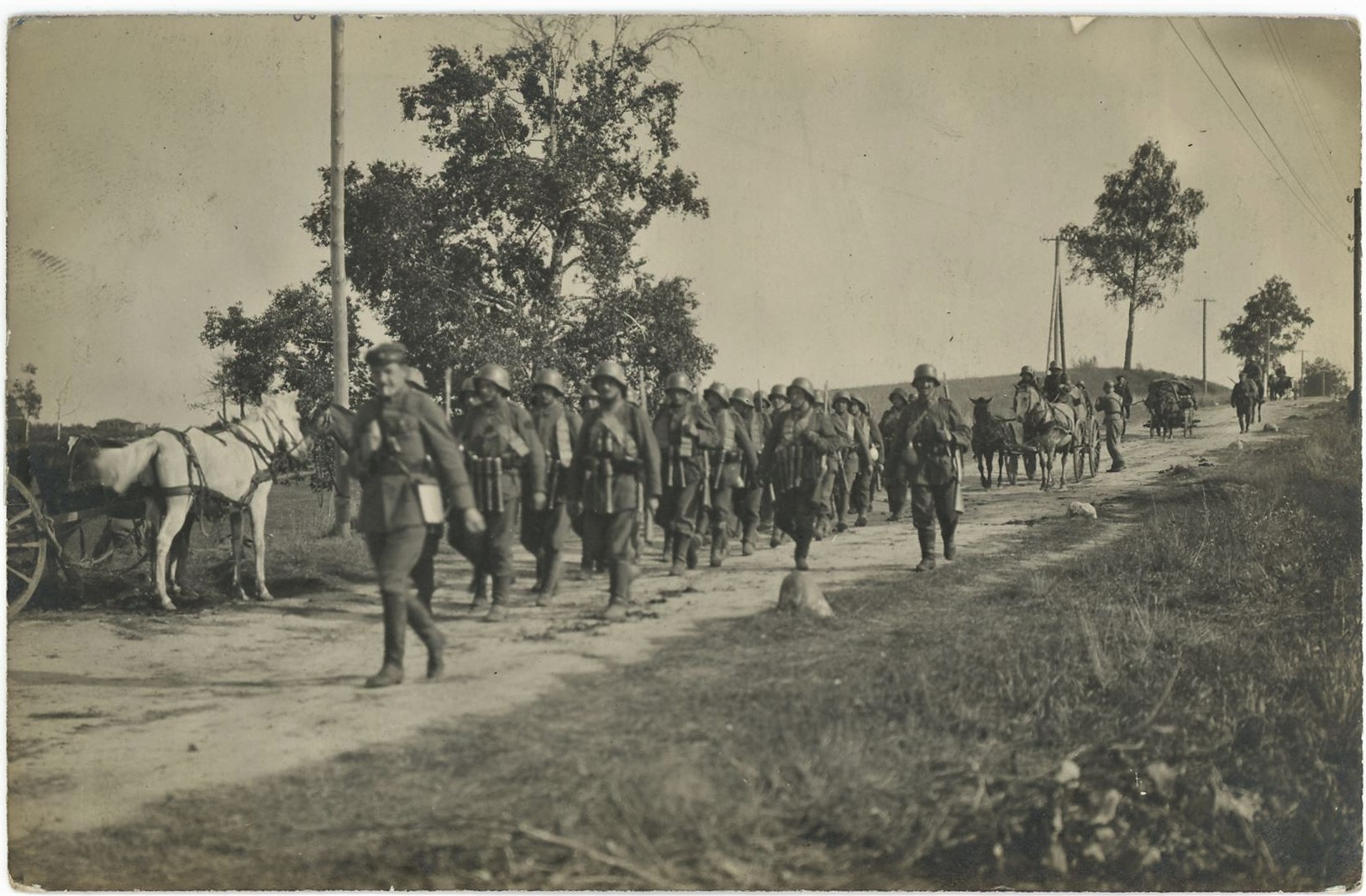
Grenadiers of the Vilnius battalion marching to the war front against the Bolsheviks near Kalkūnai, 1919

Due to the threat from Poland, the front with the Soviets was quiet for more than a month. There were minor incidents involving scouts or outpost guards. The Red Army used the time to reorganize and strengthen their forces, using natural barriers, like plentiful lakes, rivers, and hills, enhanced with trenches and barbed wires, to secure their position. They also had field fortifications from World War I about 10 km (6.2 mi) south of Daugavpils. The Soviets had larger forces: Lithuanians had two infantry regiments and five separate battalions; the Soviets had six regiments and one separate battalion. Together, the Lithuanians and the Poles planned to advance to Daugavpils starting August 9, but the plans were delayed until August 23.

The Ukmergė Group attacked first and liberated Zarasai on August 25. The Group moved about 30 km (19 mi) into the Soviet-controlled territory, but neither the right nor left flanks were adequately protected by the Polish units or the Panevėžys Group. The Panevėžys Group began advancing on August 26 and Polish troops moved along the railroad towards Turmantas. The Lithuanians manoeuvred around the old Russian fortifications, forcing the Red Army to retreat. Converging on Daugavpils, the Lithuanian–Soviet front shortened and the Lithuanians were able to concentrate their forces. On August 28, the Soviets began retreating north across the Daugava River. By August 31, on the southern shore of the Daugava, the Soviet held only Grīva, a suburb of Daugavpils.

The Bolshevik enemy was driven out from the Lithuanian territory and the narrow front stabilized as Lithuanians and Soviets were separated by the Daugava River. The Lithuanian main forces could be redeployed elsewhere, including protection of the demarcation line with Poland and the planned attacks against the Bermontians in northern Lithuania. In September 1919, joint Polish and Latvian forces took Daugava's southern shore, including Grīva. The Lithuanian–Soviet front remained open until the Battle of Daugavpils when Latvian and Polish forces captured Daugavpils in January 1920. The Lithuanians did not participate in these operations. The Lithuanians claimed the territory, taken by their soldiers, for themselves, despite Latvian protests. This led to several skirmishes between Latvian and Lithuanian troops, but the border issue was successfully mediated by Britain and finally resolved in March 1921.

== Peace treaty ==
Advance of Soviet forces (red arrows) against Polish troops in June–August 1920

The first Lithuanian–Soviet attempt at negotiations took place on 11 September 1919, after the People's Commissar of Foreign Affairs of Soviet Russia, Georgy Chicherin, sent a note with a proposal for a peace treaty. However, Lithuania delayed the talks as it feared that negotiations with communist Russia, which was isolated from European politics, would damage its relationships with the Allied Powers that had not yet recognized Lithuania. The talks began only in May 1920 and were highly influenced by the events in the Polish–Soviet War. The Soviet–Lithuanian Peace Treaty was concluded on July 12. Russia recognized Lithuania's independence and its right to the Vilnius Region; in exchange, Lithuania granted Soviet forces unrestricted movement during the war against Poland. This compromised Lithuania's declared neutrality and further deepened the Polish–Lithuanian crisis.

On 14 July 1920, the Soviets occupied Vilnius but did not transfer the city to the Lithuanian administration as agreed in the peace treaty. Instead, the Soviets planned a coup to overthrow the Lithuanian government and establish a Soviet republic. However, the Soviets lost the Battle of Warsaw and were pushed back by the Poles. Some historians credit this victory for saving Lithuania's independence from the Soviet coup. On August 26, the Red Army left Vilnius and Lithuanians prepared to defend their borders. As Poland did not recognize the treaty, this led to further hostilities. Eventually, Lithuania lost the Vilnius Region to Poland during the Żeligowski's Mutiny. When mediation by the League of Nations failed to change the situation, Lithuania and Poland were suspended in the state of "no war, no peace" until the Polish ultimatum of 1938. During all this time, Soviet Russia became Lithuania's strongest ally against Poland.

== See also ==
- Latvian War of Independence
- Estonian War of Independence

== Bibliography ==
- Ališauskas, Kazys (1953–1966), "Lietuvos kariuomenė (1918–1944)", Lietuvių enciklopedija (in Lithuanian), vol. XV, Boston, Massachusetts: Lietuvių enciklopedijos leidykla, LCCN 55020366
- Blaževičius, Kazys (November 24, 2004), "Lietuvos laisvės kovos 1919-1923 metais", XXI amžius (in Lithuanian), 88 (1291)
- Čekutis, Ričardas; Žygelis, Dalius (January 29, 2007), Laisvės kryžkelės. 1918–1920 m. laisvės kovos (in Lithuanian), Bernardinai.lt
- Čepėnas, Pranas (1986), Naujųjų laikų Lietuvos istorija (in Lithuanian), vol. II, Chicago: Dr. Griniaus fondas, ISBN 5-89957-012-1
- Davies, Norman (1998), Europe: A History, HarperPerennial, ISBN 0-06-097468-0
- Davies, Norman (1982), God's Playground: A History of Poland, vol. II, Columbia University Press, ISBN 0-231-05353-3
- Eidintas, Alfonsas; Žalys, Vytautas; Senn, Alfred Erich (1999), Lithuania in European Politics: The Years of the First Republic, 1918–1940 (Paperback ed.), New York: St. Martin's Press, ISBN 0-312-22458-3
- Jēkabsons, Ēriks (2006), "Lietuvos kariuomenė Ilūkstės apskrityje 1919–1920 metais", Karo Archyvas (in Lithuanian), XXI, ISSN 1392-6489
- Kamuntavičius, Rūstis; Kamuntavičienė, Vaida; Civinskas, Remigijus; Antanaitis, Kastytis (2001), Lietuvos istorija 11–12 klasėms (in Lithuanian), Vilnius: Vaga, ISBN 5-415-01502-7
- Lane, Thomas (2001), Lithuania: Stepping Westward (in Lithuanian), Routledge, ISBN 0-415-26731-5
- Langstrom, Tarja (2003), Transformation in Russia and International Law, Martinus Nijhoff Publishers, ISBN 90-04-13754-8
- Lesčius, Vytautas (2004), Lietuvos kariuomenė nepriklausomybės kovose 1918–1920, Lietuvos kariuomenės istorija (in Lithuanian), Vilnius: General Jonas Žemaitis Military Academy of Lithuania, ISBN 9955-423-23-4, archived from the original (PDF) on 2 January 2015
- Łossowski, Piotr (1966), Stosunki polsko-litewskie w latach 1918–1920 (in Polish), Warsaw: Książka i Wiedza, OCLC 9200888
- MacQueen, Michael (1998), "The Context of Mass Destruction: Agents and Prerequisites of the Holocaust in Lithuania", Holocaust and Genocide Studies, 12 (1): 27–48, doi:10.1093/hgs/12.1.27, archived from the original on 2007-03-10
- Raštikis, Stasys (February 1973), "Kovos dėl Lietuvos nepriklausomybės 1918–1919", Aidai (in Lithuanian), 2, ISSN 0002-208X
- Rauch, Georg von (1970), The Baltic States: The Years of Independence, University of California Press, ISBN 0-520-02600-4
- Senn, Alfred Erich (September 1962), "The Formation of the Lithuanian Foreign Office, 1918–1921", Slavic Review, 3 (21): 500–507, doi:10.2307/3000451, ISSN 0037-6779, JSTOR 3000451, S2CID 156378406
- Skirius, Juozas (2002a), "Lietuvos–Rusijos Sovietų Federacinės Socialistinės Respublikos taikos sutartis", Gimtoji istorija. Nuo 7 iki 12 klasės (in Lithuanian), Vilnius: Elektroninės leidybos namai, ISBN 9986-9216-9-4, archived from the original on 2008-03-03
- Skirius, Juozas (2002b), "Nepriklausomybės kovos 1918–1920 metais", Gimtoji istorija. Nuo 7 iki 12 klasės (in Lithuanian), Vilnius: Elektroninės leidybos namai, ISBN 9986-9216-9-4, archived from the original on 2008-03-03
- Snyder, Timothy (2004), The Reconstruction of Nations: Poland, Ukraine, Lithuania, Belarus, 1569–1999, Yale University Press, ISBN 0-300-10586-X
- Truska, Liudas (1995), Drilinga, Antanas (ed.), Lietuvos Respublikos prezidentai (in Lithuanian), Vilnius: Valstybės leidybos centras, ISBN 9986-09-055-5
- White, James D. (1994), "National Communism and World Revolution: The Political Consequences of German Military Withdrawal from the Baltic Area in 1918–19", Europe-Asia Studies, 8 (46), ISSN 0966-8136
