= Jonas Variakojis =

Lithuanian army officer (1892–1963)

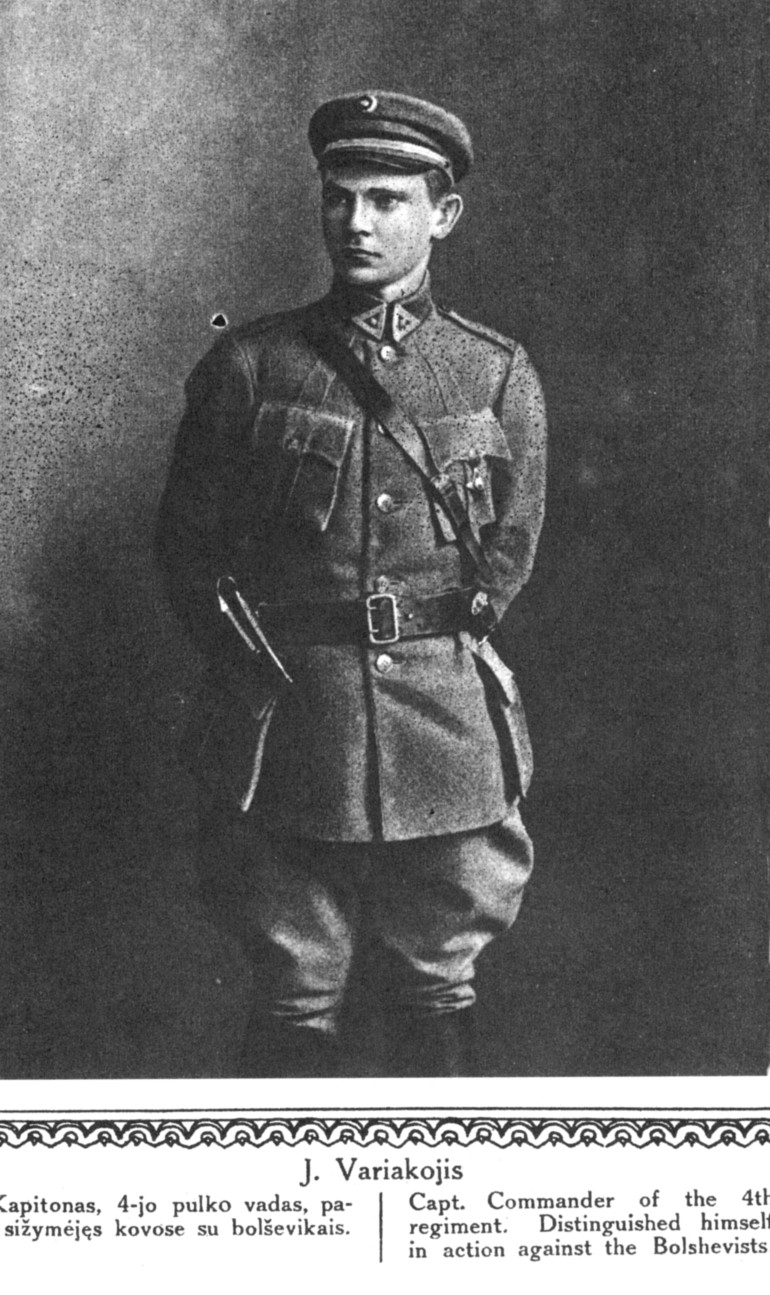
- Born: 5 May 1892; Rinkuškiai (village), Russian Empire
- Died: 31 October 1963 (aged 71); St. Charles, Illinois, United States

Jonas Variakojis (5 May 1892 – 31 October 1963) was a Lithuanian Army officer.

== Early life ==
Variakojis was born near Rinkuškiai (village), then the Kaunas Governorate, Russian Empire.

Variakojis finished the Pärnu Gymnasium in 1913 and later studied law at the University of St. Petersburg.

== World War I ==
Variakojis finished studying at the Vladimir Military School in 1917 and he was mobilized into the Imperial Russian Army, being sent to the Austrian front on the Eastern Front during World War I.

== Lithuanian Wars of Independence ==
In December 1918, he returned to Lithuania and joined the newly organized Lithuanian army, which was preparing to defend Lithuania against the Red Army during the Lithuanian–Soviet War. Variakojis was ordered to organize the Panevėžys Region Defence Unit (Lithuanian: Panevėžio srities apsaugos būrys), which later became the 4th Infantry Regiment. On 7 February 1919, he led the first Lithuanian battles against the Soviets near Kėdainiai. The Soviet advance was stopped, preventing them from capturing Lithuania's temporary capital, Kaunas. Variakojis with his unit continued to combat the Soviets. They were also deployed against Poland during the Polish–Lithuanian War.

For his distinguished services during the Lithuanian Wars of Independence, he was awarded several military orders, including the Order of the Cross of Vytis.

== Later life ==
In 1926, he retired from active military duty. He briefly served as the Minister of Communications and Minister of Defense between 1928 and 1930.

At the end of World War II, he retreated to Germany and then immigrated to the United States, where he died in 1963.

== Sources ==
- Simas Sužiedėlis, ed. (1970–1978). "Variakojis, Jonas". Encyclopedia Lituanica. Vol. VI. Boston, Massachusetts: Juozas Kapočius. p. 59. LCCN 74-114275.
- unknown (19 May 2021). "Panevėžio šlovės alėja: žymiausieji kraštiečiai".
