= Pskov Rifle Division =

- Active: May 3, 1918 – May 21, 1919
- Country: Russian SFSR
- Branch: Red Army
- Type: Rifle division
- Size: ~2,500 soldiers (Jan. 1919)
- Engagements: Russian Civil War; Lithuanian–Soviet War

Commanders
- First commander: Vladimir Olderogge

The Pskov Rifle Division (Russian: Псковская стрелковая дивизия), later renamed on January 21, 1919, to the Lithuanian Rifle Division (Russian: Литовская стрелковая дивизия), was a Red Army rifle division during the Russian Civil War and Lithuanian–Soviet War. In reality, the division was Lithuanian in name only.

== Formation ==
The Rifle Division was formed as the Novorzhevsky Rifle Division by the order of the Military Council of the Petrograd Defense District and the Northern Section of the Screen Detachments (part of the curtain forces) on May 3, 1918, from volunteer detachments of the Novorzhevsky combat section.

== 1918 ==
=== May–October ===

Positions of the Pskov Rifle Division

From May 1918, it guarded Russia's western border on the Novorzhev-Idritsa-Nevel-Velikiye Luki-Toropets line. Initially, it fought in the ranks of the 7th Army in the vicinity of Petrograd, and then in the Western Army. It was renamed on June 14, 1918, to the Pskov Rifle Division.

=== November–December ===
In December 1918, due to the German retreat and the Soviet westward offensive of 1918–1919, the division occupied Polotsk (in Belarus), Ludza, Rēzekne, Daugavpils (in Latvia).

== 1919 ==
In January 1919, during the Battle of Vilnius, it occupied Vilnius.

In the first day of January 1919, the division's 3rd Rifle Brigade advanced towards Ukmergė and Panevėžys, while the 2nd Rifle Brigade, reinforced by the 5th Vilnius Rifle Regiment, marched directly towards Vilnius, along the railway line from Daugavpils through Pabradė to Vilnius. The third group was the division's 1st Rifle Brigade, which was ordered to capture Vileyka, and from there, along the Maladzyechna-Vilnius railway, to advance on to Vilnius. After reaching Pabradė, the Soviet forces were divided.

The division at the time included six rifle regiments, the 3rd raion of the 2nd Border Protection District (Russian: 2-й пограничный округ), two squadrons from the 1st Vitebsk Rifle Division, and the 1st Vitebsk Air Group (totaling 2,473 bayonets, 65 sabers, 78 machine guns, 9 cannons, and 8 aircraft). This matches the information of the Polish intelligence, that the division had 2,470 soldiers, 65 cavalrymen, 78 machine guns, 9 field guns, 8 aircraft in February.

From January 21, 1919, the division was renamed to the Lithuanian Rifle Division. Then in February 1919, the division occupied Panevėžys. In March 1919, it became part of the Lithuanian-Belorussian Army.

In March–May 1919, it fought with the Polish Army in the Vilnius Region and on the Daugava bridgehead. During its retreat to the Daugava line, it suffered heavy losses. It suffered heavy losses and on May 21 it was consolidated into a brigade, on the basis of which the 4th Rifle Division was formed.

== Order of Battle ==
In January 1919:

- 1st Brigade
  - 2nd Pskov Rifle Regiment
  - 3rd Pskov Rifle Regiment
- 2nd Brigade
  - 1st Pskov Rifle Regiment
  - 4th Pskov Rifle Regiment
- 3rd Brigade
  - 5th Pskov Rifle Regiment
  - 6th Pskov Rifle Regiment
- 2nd Border District's 3rd raion
- Two cavalry squadrons (from the 1st Vitebsk Rifle Division)
- 1st Vitebsk Air Group (8 aircraft)

== Division names ==
- 3 May – 14 June 1918: Novorzhevsky Rifle Division.
- 14 June 1918 – 21 January 1919: Pskov Rifle Division.
- 21 January – 21 May 1919: Lithuanian Rifle Division.

== Officers ==
Divisional commanders:

- Vladimir Olderogge (May 3, 1918 – March 7, 1919),
- A. I. Makulovich (March 7–27, 1919),
- M. V. Lezhinsky (March 27 – May 5, 1919),
- V. I. Solodukhin (May 5–21, 1919).

Political commissars:

- G.D. Khakhanyan (May 3 – August 4, 1918)
- A. I. Sedyakin (May 3 – August 4, 1918)
- V. A. Popov (August 4 – October 1, 1918)
- I. G. Grigoriev (August 4 – September 6, 1918; October 1, 1918 – March 19, 1919; March 30 – April 15, 1919)
- M. E. Sergeev (September 7 – December 12, 1918)
- L. D. Morozov (December 12, 1918 – March 30, 1919)
- Ya. L. Askoldov (March 19 – May 21, 1919)
- Ya. Khazanov (5–21 May 1919)

== Sources ==
- Khromov, Semyon (1983). "Литовская стрелковая дивизия" [Civil war and military intervention in the USSR] (PDF). Гражданская война и военная интервенция в СССР (in Russian). Vol. 2. Moscow: Sovetskaya Entsiklopediya. p. 334.
- Odziemkowski, Janusz (2004). Leksykon wojny polsko–rosyjskiej 1919–1920 (in Polish). Warsaw: Oficyna Wydawnicza „Rytm”. ISBN 83-7399-096-8.
- Odziemkowski, Janusz (2021). "Decyzje, które ocaliły niepodległość". Pamięć i Sprawiedliwość (in Polish). 38 (2). doi:10.48261/pis213802. ISSN 1427-7476.
- Rezmer, Waldemar (2010-12-01). "Walki o Wilno w styczniu 1919 roku – początek wojny polsko-sowieckiej". Europa Orientalis. Studia z Dziejów Europy Wschodniej i Państw Bałtyckich. (in Polish). 2. doi:10.12775/eo.2010.003. ISSN 2081-8742.
