= Subačius =

- City
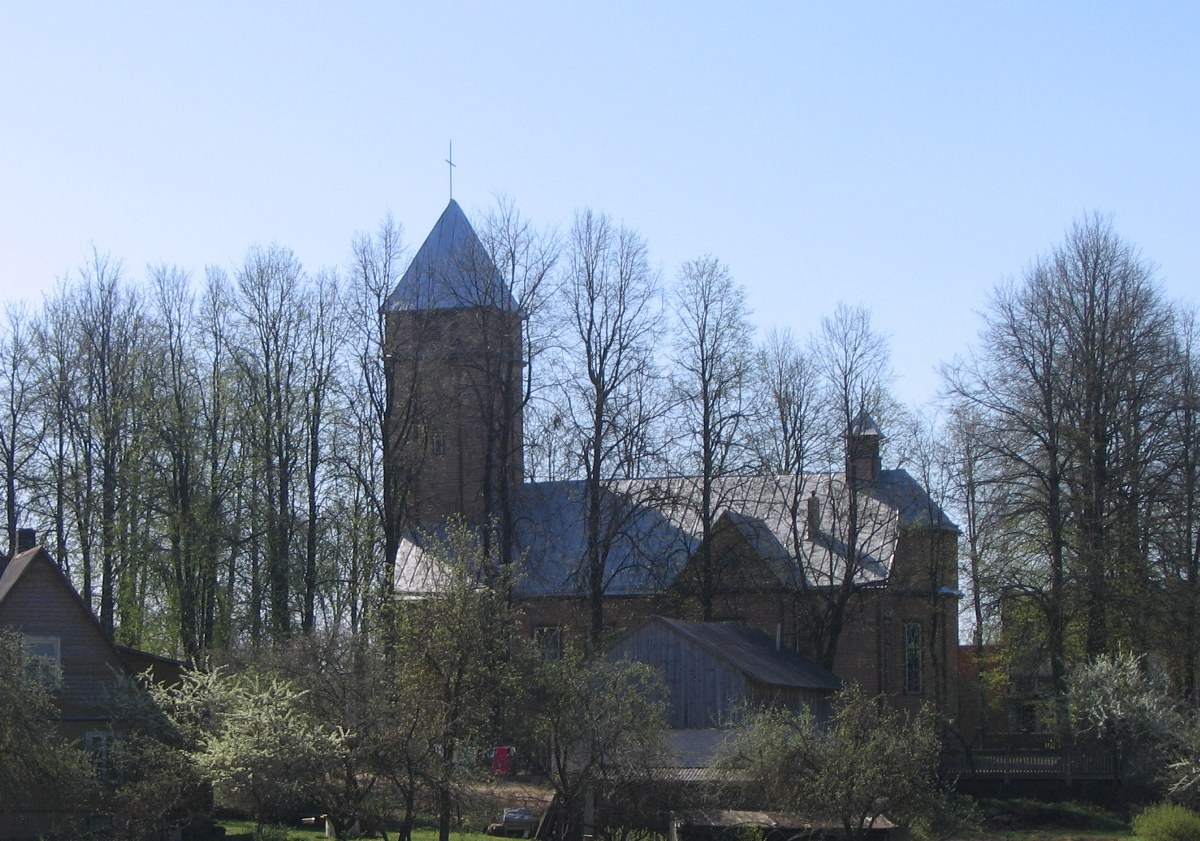
- A church in Subačius city

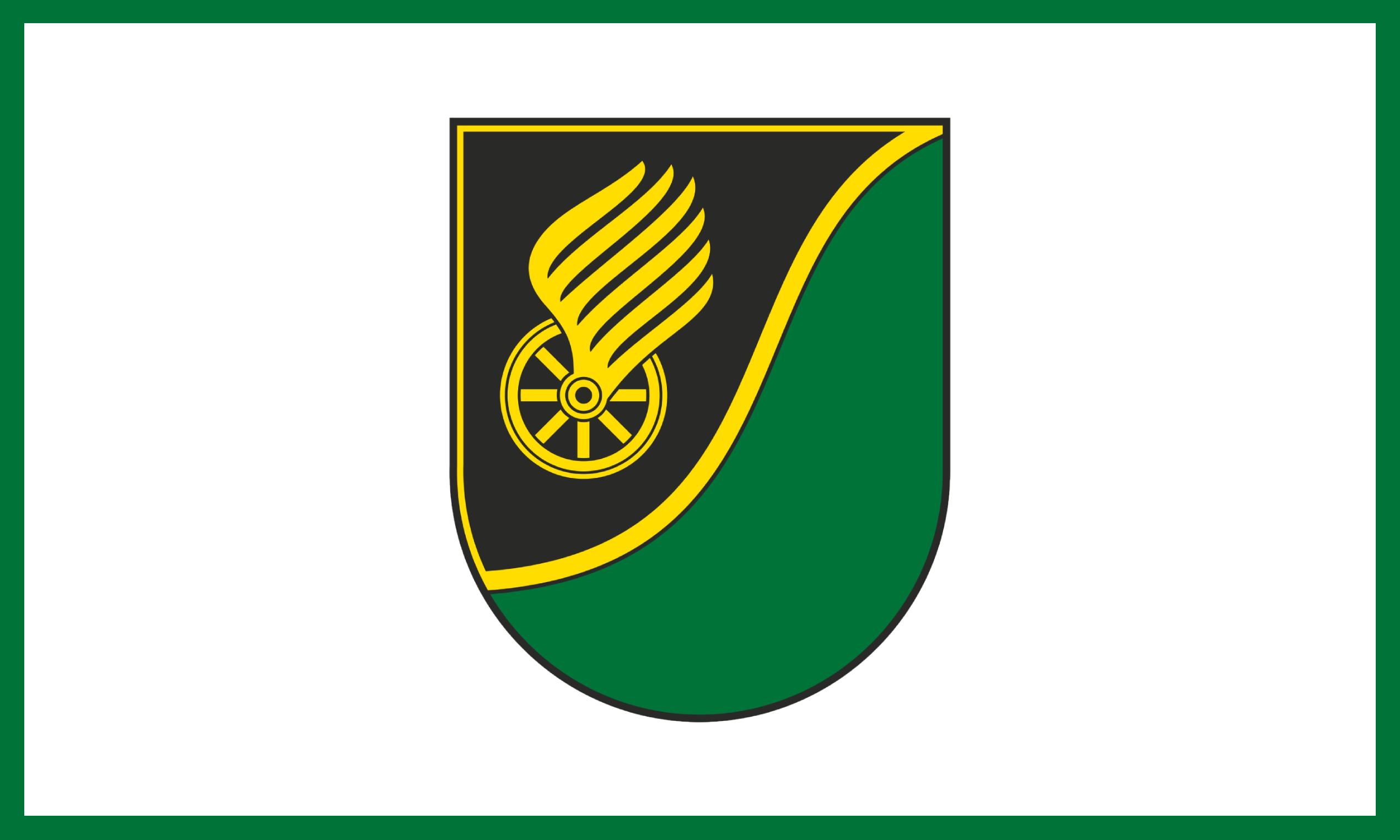
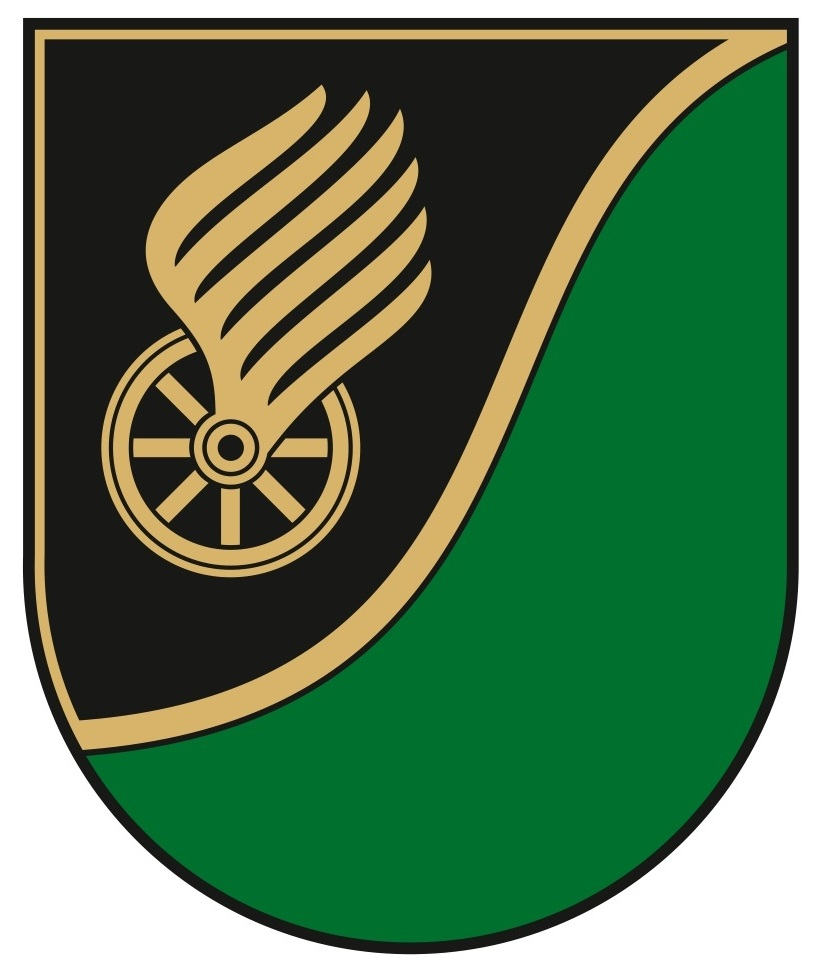
- Flag Coat of arms

- Location of Subačius
- Coordinates: 55°46′0″N 24°45′0″E
- Country: Lithuania
- Ethnographic region: Aukštaitija
- County: Panevėžys County
- Municipality: Kupiškis district municipality
- Eldership: Subačius eldership
- Capital of: Subačius eldership
- First mentioned: 1837
- Granted city rights: 1958

Population (2022)
  - Total: 865
- Time zone: UTC+2 (EET)
  - Summer (DST): UTC+3 (EEST)

Subačius (Polish: Subocz) is a small town in Panevėžys County, northwestern Lithuania. It is located on the banks of the Viešinta River about 14 km (8.7 mi) west of Kupiškis.

== History ==
During World War II, the Jewish community was murdered in a mass execution perpetrated by an Einsatzgruppen of Germans helped by Lithuanian nationalists. Some Jews were shot dead near the town's railway station. Others were transported to Kupiškis, where they were murdered. 80 people were massacred, a monument was built on the execution site.
