= Jieznas =

- City
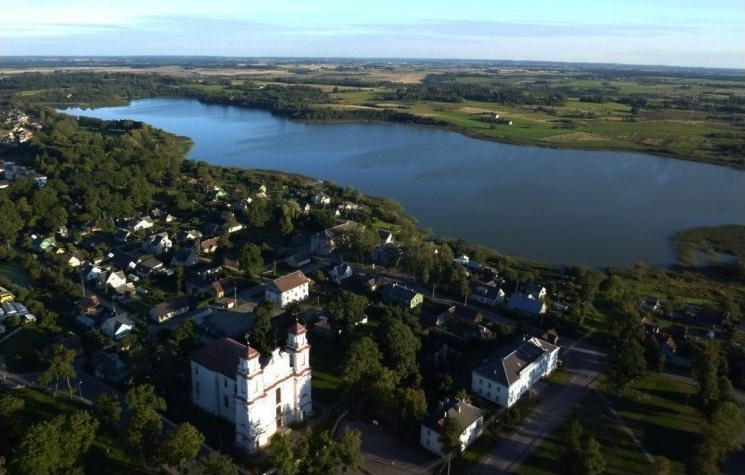
- A part of Jieznas and its lake.

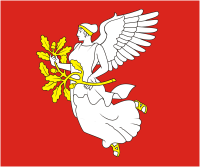
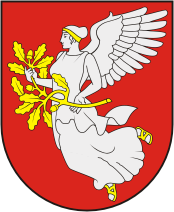
- Flag Coat of arms

- Location of Jieznas
- Coordinates: 54°36′N 24°10′E
- Country: Lithuania
- Ethnographic region: Dzūkija
- County: Kaunas County
- Municipality: Prienai district municipality
- Eldership: Jieznas eldership
- Capital of: Jieznas eldership
- First mentioned: 1492
- Granted city rights: 1956

Area
  - Total: 2.50 km^{2} (0.97 sq mi)

Population (2023)
  - Total: 1 024
  - Density: 410/km^{2} (1,100/sq mi)
- Time zone: UTC+2 (EET)
  - Summer (DST): UTC+3 (EEST)

Jieznas is a small city in the Prienai district municipality, Lithuania. It is located 16 km (9.9 mi) east of Prienai along the northern shores of Lake Jieznas.

== History ==
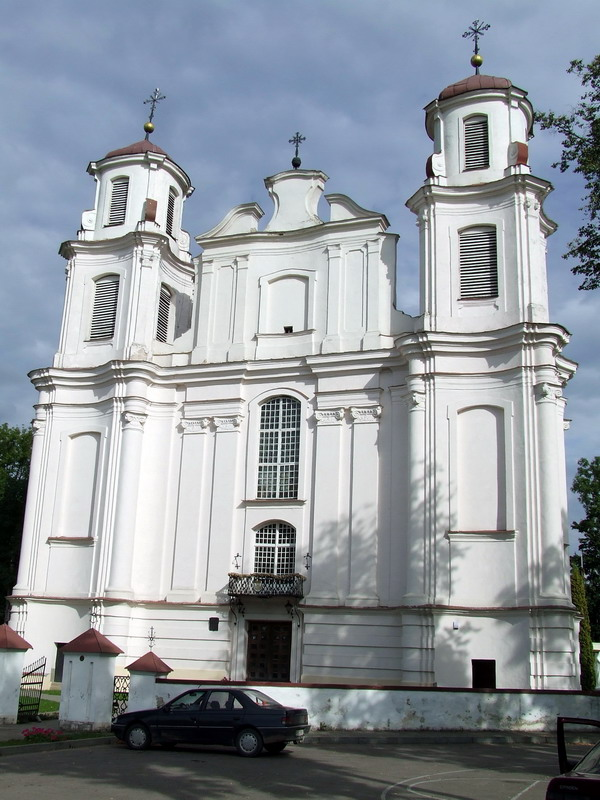
Jieznas church

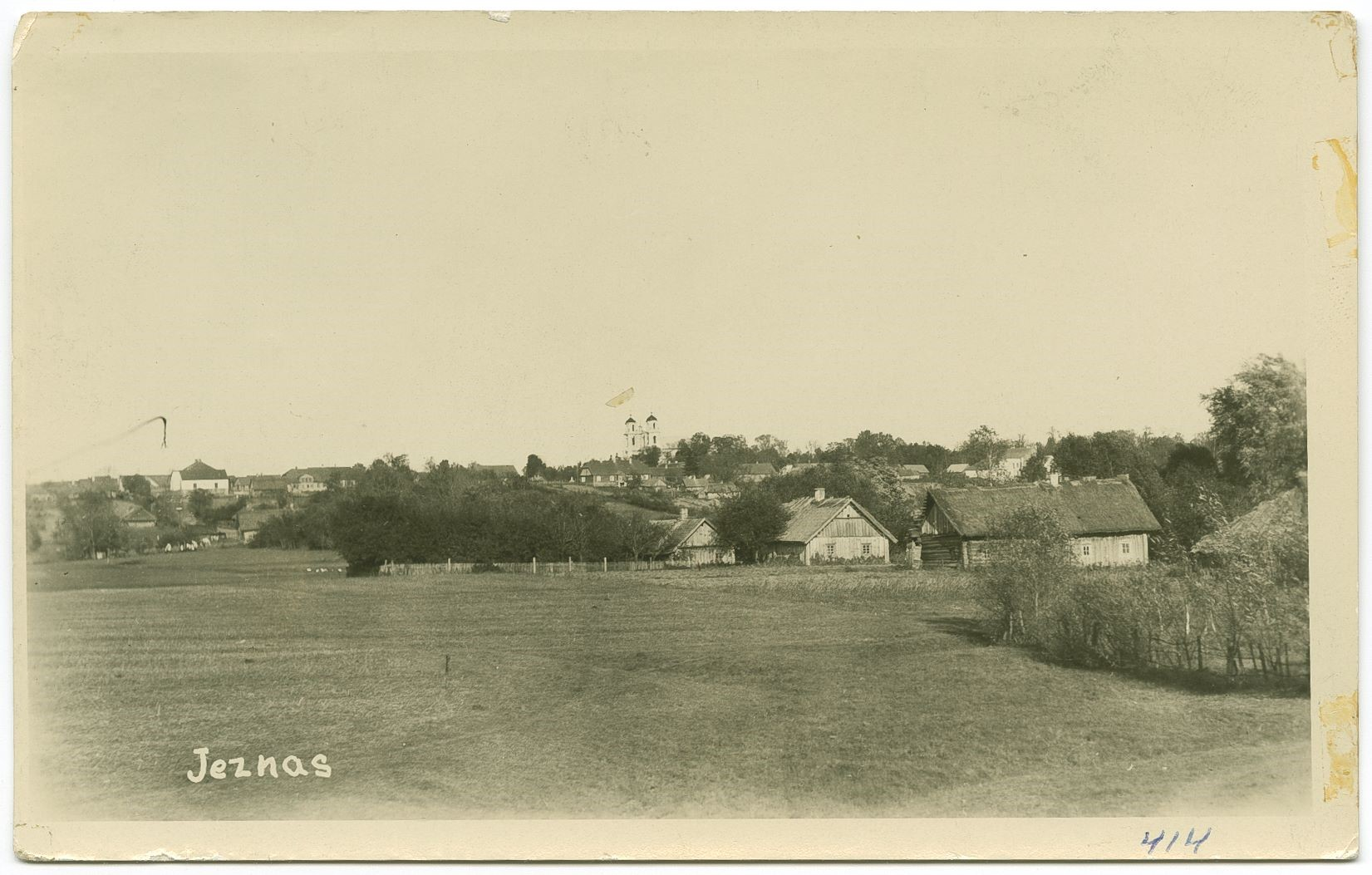
View of Jieznas during the interbellum

Jieznas was first mentioned in written sources in 1492 as property of the Grand Duke of Lithuania. In 1633, the settlement was acquired by the Pac family. They sponsored construction of a church, which was reconstructed in Baroque style in 1768–1772.

In 1747, the Pac family built a luxurious palace in Jieznas. The palace had 12 halls, 52 rooms, and 365 windows to match the number of months, weeks, and days in a year. It was decorated with frescoes, gilded engravings and Venetian mirrors. The palace was lost due to family indebtedness in 1807 and was destroyed by a fire in 1837.

In early February 1919, the Lithuanian victory in the battle of Jieznas, one of the first battles of the Lithuanian–Soviet War, prevented the Red Army from marching into Kaunas. This battle is commemorated by the coat or arms, designed by Arvydas Každailis in 2002. The coat of arms depicts allegorical figure of a woman symbolizing the victory. She holds a golden oak branch, a symbol of strength.

On September 2, 1941, 144 Jews from Jieznas were shot near the lake in Strazdiškės village by Rollkommando Hamann, policemen and members of the Riflemen's Union from Jieznas.

== Name ==
Jieznas is the Lithuanian name of the city. Transcribed versions of the Lithuanian name in other languages include Polish: Jezno, Russian: Езно Yezno, Belarusian: Езна Yezna, Yiddish: יעזנע Yiezne.

It is unclear where the name Jieznas came from. Possible contenders are Lake Jieznas, the stream Jieznelė or the river Jieznis. It is most likely that the original was the name of the lake, and the names of the city and river originated from it.

According to folk etymology, Lake Jieznas was very deep, and no one could reach its bottom. They used to say that it was bottomless. Before the Pac family, Jieznas belonged to Yekaterina's descendants. Once, while feasting by the lake, they decided to make sure that the lake was really bottomless. One of three men dived - he did not reach the bottom, the second one didn't either. Finally the third man dived and did not emerge from the water for a long time. Everyone waited, hoping he would return. Finally he emerged and shouted: Есть дно! ("There's a bottom!"). Since then, the lake was called Jiezno, and the city also remained Jiezno.
