= 1st Hussar Regiment (Lithuania) =

Hussar Regiment of the Lithuanian Army (1919–1940)

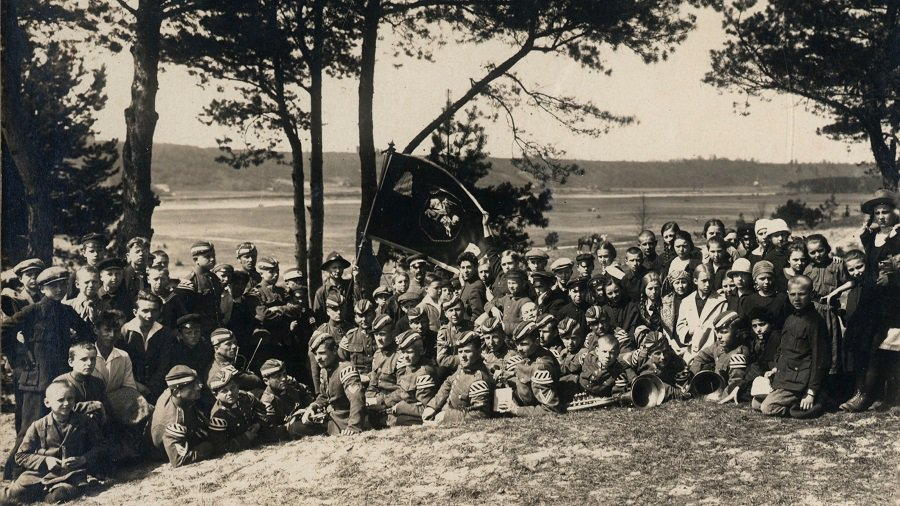
Hussars outside, enjoying the weather (1923–1924)

The 1st Hussar Regiment of the Lithuanian Grand Hetman Duke Jonušas Radvila (Lithuanian: 1-asis husarų Lietuvos Didžiojo Etmono Jonušo Radvilos pulkas), also known as the 1st Cavalry Regiment (Lithuanian: 1-asis raitelių pulkas) was a hussar regiment that served in the Lithuanian Army during the Interwar period.

== Official titles ==
- 1st Lithuanian Mounted Regiment (Lithuanian: 1-asis lietuvių raitelių pulkas) (1919-05-12–1919-10-24)
- 1st Mounted Regiment (Lithuanian: 1-asis raitelių pulkas) (1919-10-25–1921-07-09)
- 1st Cavalry Regiment (Lithuanian: 1-asis kavalerijos pulkas) (1921-07-10–1922-03-31)
- 1st Hussar Regiment (Lithuanian: 1-asis gusarų pulkas) (1922-04-01–1927-09-24)
- 1st Hussar Regiment of the Grand Lithuanian Hetman Duke Jonušas Radvila (Lithuanian: 1-asis gusarų Didžiojo Lietuvos etmono kunigaikščio Jonušo Radvilos pulkas) (1927-09-25–1939-10-06)
- 1st Hussar Regiment of the Duke Jonušas Radvila (Lithuanian: 1-asis husarų kunigaikščio Jonušo Radvilos pulkas) (1939-10-07–1940-07-24)
- 1st Hussar Regiment (Lithuanian: 1-asis husarų pulkas) (1940-07-25–1940-10-27)

== Formation ==
In the autumn of 1918, the first Lithuanian military units, including cavalry squadrons, began to be formed for the struggle for Lithuania's independence. The 1st Hussar Squadron was established in Kaunas on 9 January 1919. Officer J. Kasiulis was as the 1st Squadron's commander. On 4 February 1919, the formation of the 2nd Hussar Squadron began. Officer Aleksandras Laikūnas was appointed as its commander. On April 1, a gendarme squad of 40 selected soldiers was formed from both squadrons to maintain order in Kaunas' garrison. In early 1919, a 20-strong Hussar group was guarding the French Military Mission in Kaunas.

== Lithuanian Wars of Independence ==
In 1919–1920, the 1st Cavalry Regiment fought against the Red Army, Bermontians and units of the Polish Army.

The first battles with the Bolsheviks showed that the Lithuanian army required more cavalry. So, the Commander-in-Chief of the Armed Forces, General Silvestras Žukauskas issued an order on 12 May 1919 that all mounted units be formed into the 1st Lithuanian Mounted Regiment (Lithuanian: 1-asis lietuvių raitelių pulkas). Major G. E. Hoeger of the Swedish Armed Forces was made its commander. Since July 1, the regiment was taken over by Officer Pranas Jackevičius, who also started forming the 3rd Squadron.

On 10 November 1919, the regiment was named the 1st Mounted Regiment (Lithuanian: 1-asis raitelių pulkas). As the situation on the fronts deteriorated, a 4th Squadron (commander J. Kalino, an officer of Lithuanian Tartar origin) was formed.

Five hussars of this regiment died during combat in 1919–1923. Six officers and 48 soldiers of the regiment were awarded the Order of the Cross of Vytis for excellence in combat.

== Interwar ==
On 1 August 1921, it was renamed as the 1st Cavalry Regiment (Lithuanian: 1-asis kavalerijos pulkas).

On 1 April 1922, the regiment was renamed as 1st Hussar Regiment.

On 25 September 1927, the regiment's feastday, the regiment was renamed to 1st Hussar Regiment of the Lithuanian Grand Hetman Duke Jonušas Radvila (Lithuanian: 1-asis gusarų Didžiojo Lietuvos etmono kunigaikščio Jonušo Radvilos pulkas) and the regiment was presented with a flag with the motto "Nugalėsim ar mirsim" (We will defeat [the enemy] or we will die). The regiment was given the privilege of the monogram JR with a ducal crown, which were written on the epaulettes of the soldiers' uniforms.

In September 1939, the regiment had the following squadrons: four regular, one each for heavy machine guns, training, economy. In addition, there were the anti-aircraft and anti-tank gun groups, and an armored squad. In peacetime, the regiment was stationed in the Žaliakalnis barracks in Kaunas.

== Soviet occupation and disbandment ==
After the USSR occupied Lithuania, on 25 July 1940 it was renamed the 1st Hussar Regiment. The regiment was disbanded on 30 August 1940.

== Regimental commanders ==
- 1919 – Major G. E. Hoegeris
- 1919 – Colonel Pranas Jackevičius
- Colonel Jonas Litvinas
- Major T. Engmanas
- Officer Šileris
- 1920-1929 – Povilas Plechavičius
- General Staff Lieutenant colonel J. Bačkus
- 1935-1939 – General Staff Colonel Aloyzas Valušis
- 1939-1940 – General Staff Colonel Izidorius Kraunaitis
- 1940 – Colonel Kazimieras Gudelis

== Uniforms ==
In 1931, the hussars were the first in the Lithuanian army to have used Jonušas Radvila's monogram "JR" with a ducal crown as a distinctive sign on their epaulettes. The "JR" was in massive white metal letters. The soldiers' hats were red. The uniform was grey-green, the collars were triangular and white with Columns of Gediminas. The cuffs and sleeve cuffs were white, the trousers - red, in a hussar fashion, with white cuffs, boots had rosettes at the boot's top.

== Sources ==
- Vydrina, Elena (2009). "lcva fondo 524 pažyma". Lietuvos centrinis valstybės archyvas (in Lithuanian).
- Vaičenonis, Jonas (2018). "Husarų pulkas". Universal Lithuanian Encyclopedia (in Lithuanian).
