= Stakliškės =

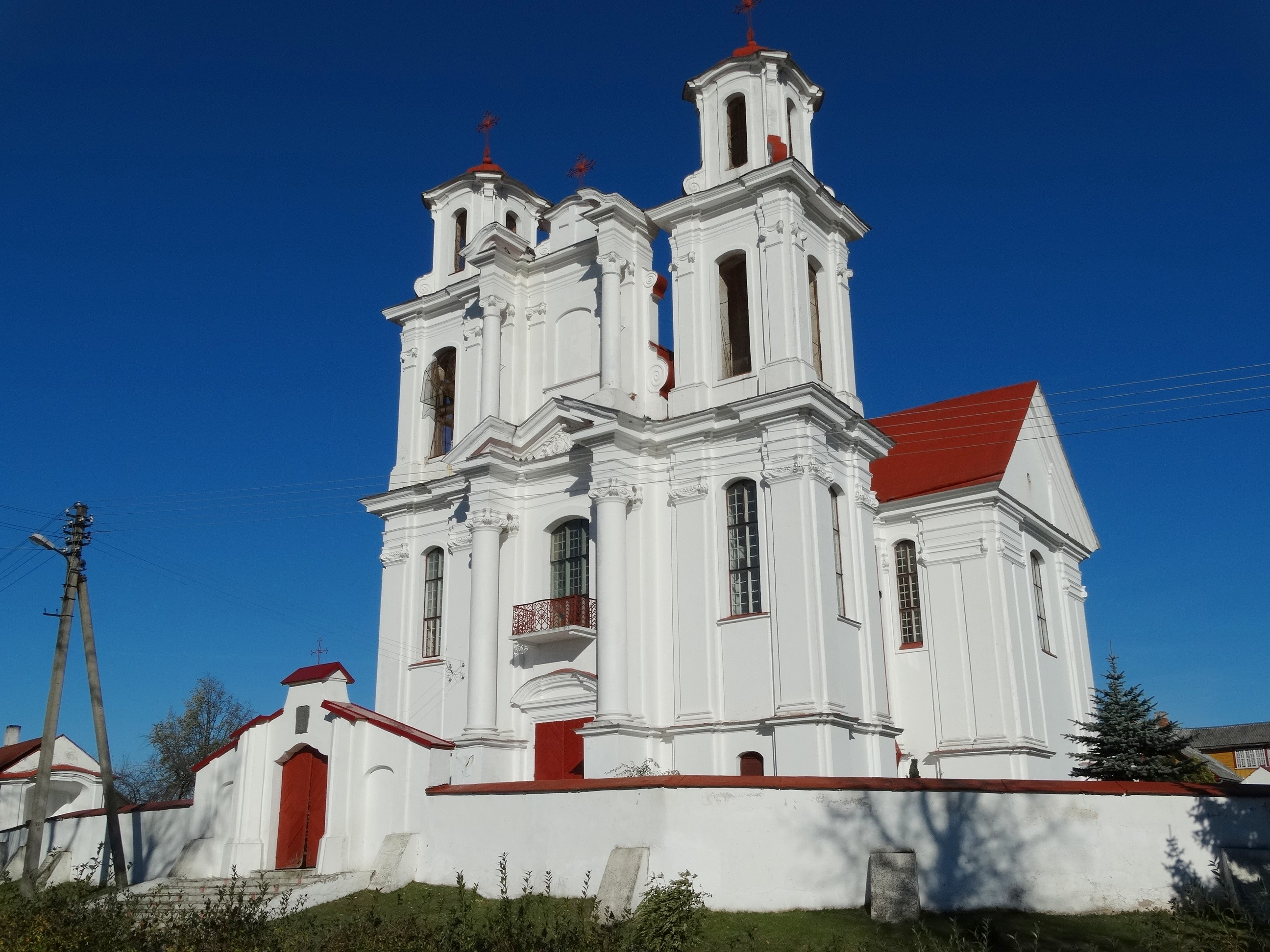
- The church of Stakliškės.

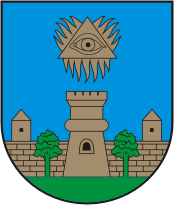
- Coat of arms

- Location of Stakliškės
- Coordinates: 54°35′30″N 24°19′10″E
- Country: Lithuania
- Ethnographic region: Dzūkija
- County: Kaunas County
- Municipality: Prienai district municipality
- Elderate: Stakliškės rural elderate
- First mentioned: 1375
- Granted city rights: 1792

Population (2021)
  - Total: 562
- Time zone: UTC+2 (EET)
  - Summer (DST): UTC+3 (EEST)

Stakliškės (pronounced "stahk-LIH-shkyes") is a village in Lithuania, located east of Prienai, in Prienai district of Kaunas County on the Prienai-Trakai road. Stakliškės is a center of Stakliškės elderate. The famous type of Lithuanian mead, an alcoholic beverage distilled from grain, honey and water is produced in Stakliškės. According to the 2011 census, the village had 747 residents.

== History ==
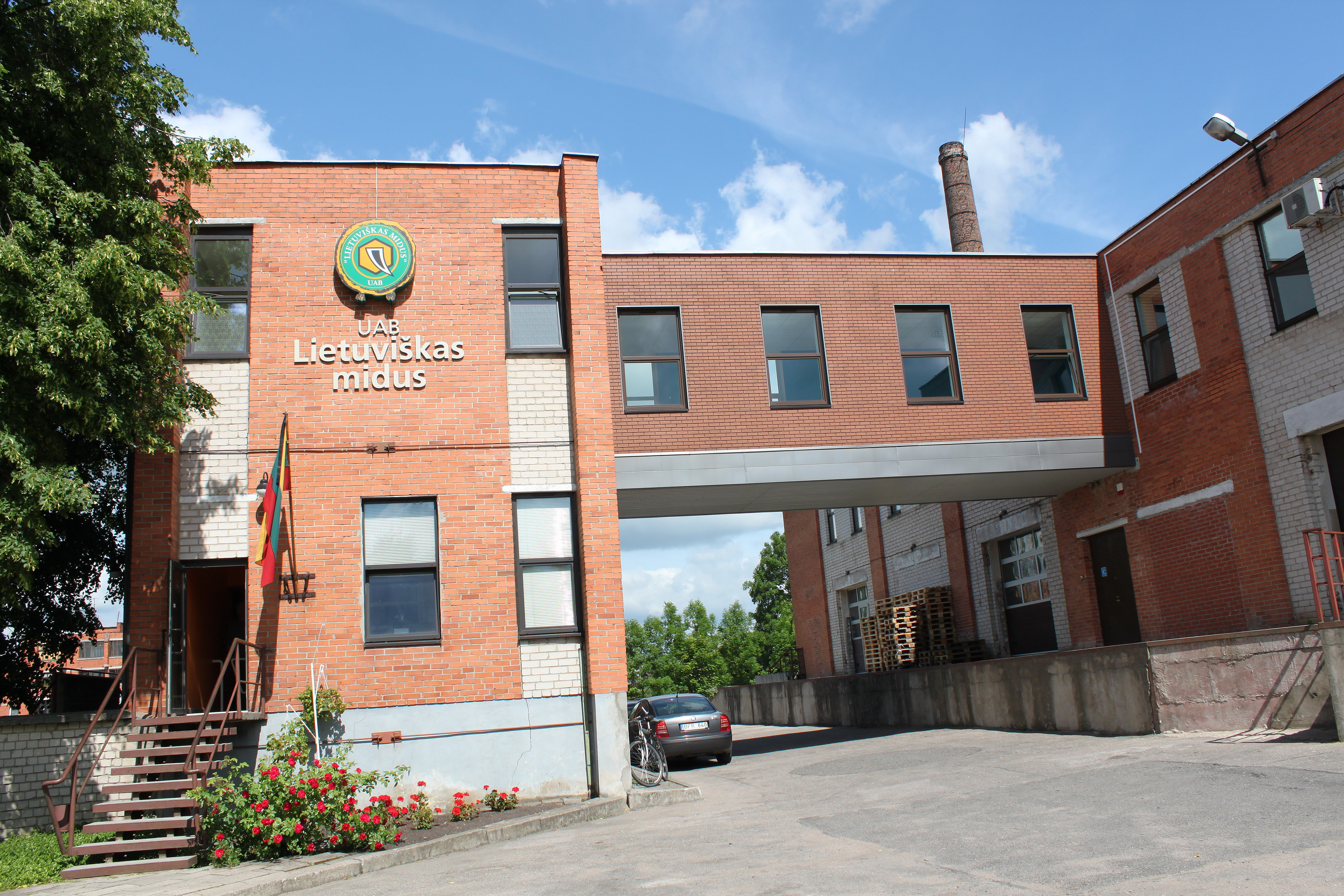
Lithuanian mead company

The place has been known since the end of the 14th century (in 1375 it was mentioned in the Teutonic Knights Chronicles as Staghelisken, in 1385 as Stakelisken). Since 1513 it was a town, and in 1586 the first church was built.

After reforms of the Great Sejm, on 16 January 1792 the monarch Stanisław August Poniatowski granted the town Magdeburg rights. At the time the city was awarded a coat of arms.

Stakliškės (Stoklishok in Yiddish) included a large Jewish population prior to World War II. When Germany occupied Lithuania in June of 1941, a few Jews and others suspected of Soviet sympathies were taken away and shot. The remaining Jews were pressed into work until late August and early September, when Nazis and their Lithuanian collaborators murdered all of them along with well over a thousand Jews from surrounding regions. Only one Jewish girl from Stakliškės, Sarah Epshtein, survived under the protection of a Polish estate owner, a peasant couple, and partisan fighters.

The current village coat of arms was granted by presidential decree on 18 December 1997.
