= General Jonas Žemaitis Military Academy of Lithuania =

State-sponsored institution of higher learning

Coordinates: 54°42′08″N 25°18′48″E

- Generolo Jono Žemaičio; Lietuvos karo akademija
- Type: Military academy
- Established: 1919; 107 years ago as War School of Kaunas
- Budget: €20.3 million (2023)
- Commandant: Ričardas Dumbliauskas
- Academic staff: 578
- Undergraduates: personnel management, transport engineering management, and international relations
- Postgraduates: personnel management and military diplomacy
- Location: Šilo Str. 5A, Vilnius, Lithuania
- Website: www.lka.lt

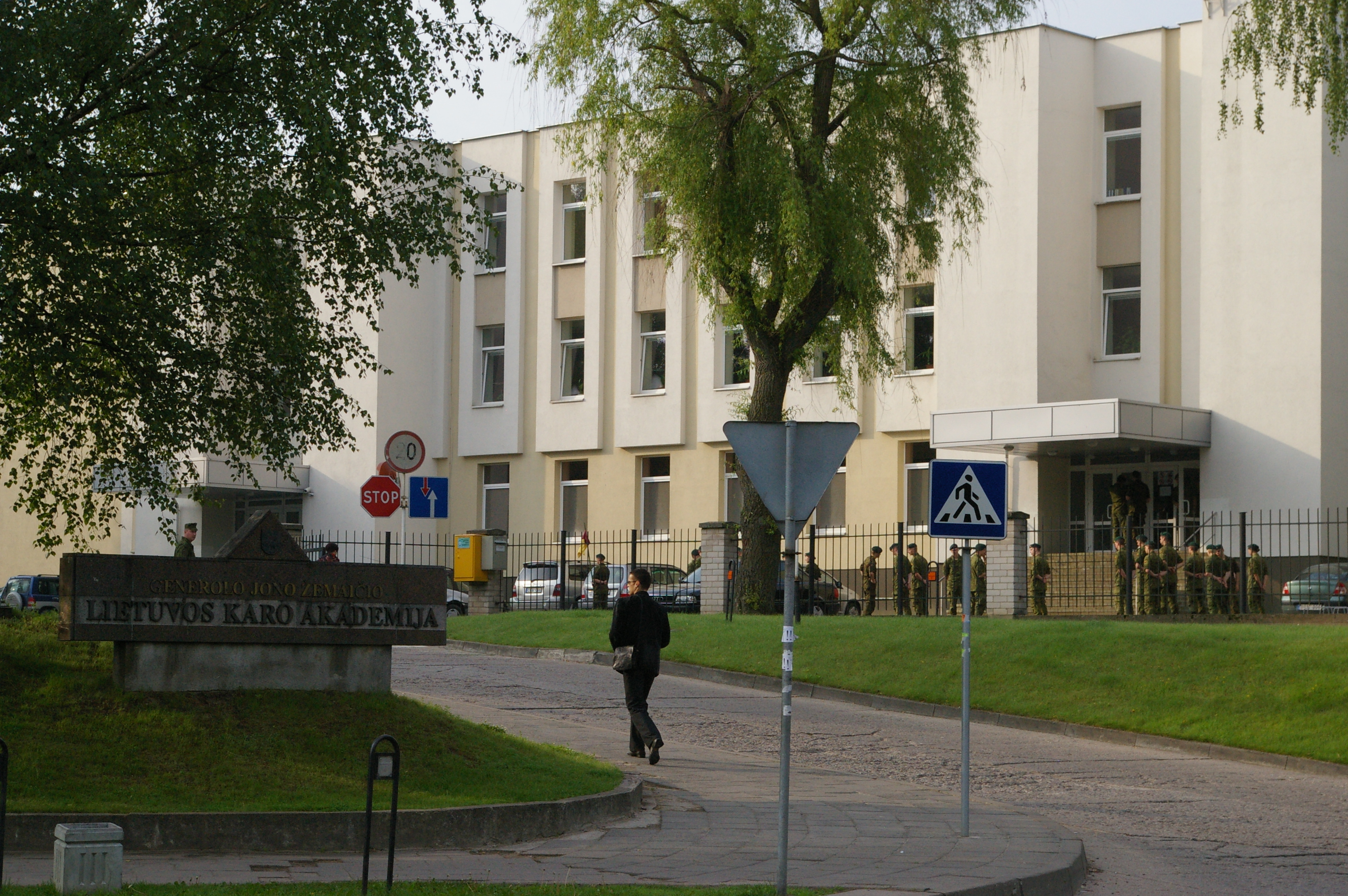
Entrance to the academy

The General Jonas Žemaitis Military Academy of Lithuania (Generolo Jono Žemaičio Lietuvos karo akademija) is a state-sponsored institution of higher learning based in Vilnius, Lithuania. It was founded in 1994 by the Lithuanian Seimas, and is overseen by the Ministry of National Defense. It is named in honor of General Jonas Žemaitis, commander of the armed anti-Soviet resistance in Lithuania.

== History ==
The academy continues the traditions of War School of Kaunas, established on 9 March 1919. On 16 December 1992, by order of the government, the National Defense School was established under the Lithuanian Armed Forces. On 18 January 1994, the school was reorganized into the Lithuanian Military Academy. On 20 October 1998, the academy was named after partisan general Jonas Žemaitis. Since September 2000, women have been admitted to the academy as cadets and now comprise over 15 percent of all cadets.

=== Commandants ===
Commandants of the academy were:

- COL Algimantas Vaitkaitis (acting) (21 February 1992 – 28 August 1992)
- COL Jonas Andriškevičius (24 August 1992 – 25 October 1993)
- BG Zenonas Kulys (October 26, 2000 – February 21, 2000)
- COl Algis Vaičeliūnas (February 22, 2000 – September 17, 2003)
- COL Algimantas Vyšniauskas (acting) (18 September 2003 – 31 July 2005)
- COL Arūnas Balčiūnas (August 1, 2005 – August 31, 2008)
- BG Edvardas Mažeikis (September 1, 2008 – September 9, 2010)
- COL Gintaras Bagdonas (May 10, 2010 – June 5, 2012)
- COL Eugenijus Vosylius (June 6, 2012 – July 1, 2015)
- COL Raimundas Matulis (August 3, 2015 – April 19, 2017)
- BG Algis Vaičeliūnas (April 19, 2017 – November 22, 2018)
- COL Darius Vaicikauskas (acting) (November 22, 2018)
- COL Juozas Kačergius (January 25, 2019 – 2 September 2022)
- BG Almantas Leika (2 September 2022 – November 25, 2024)
- COL Ričardas Dumbliauskas (November 25, 2024 – present)

== Academics ==
The academy delivers internationally recognized bachelor's, master's and doctoral education to members of the Lithuanian defense and national security community, and offers multiple professional military education, language, and national security training courses. The academy has over 50 researchers and enrolls over 100 cadets and 60 other degree students annually.

== Student life ==
=== Men's choir ===
The Academy Men's Choir "Kariūnas" (lith. Cadet) was established in 1995 and is the only military choir in Lithuania.

=== Facilities ===
The academy campus covers a territory of 5 ha in the Vilnius neighborhood of Antakalnis.

== International cooperation ==
The academy participates in the European Initiative for the Exchange of Young Officers (sometimes referred to as "Military Erasmus" or EMILYO), a network of 65 military higher education institutions, and implements international semesters for officer-cadets with participants from Austria, Belgium, France, Italy, Poland, USA and other countries.

The academy is also a partner institution of the International Society of Military Sciences (ISMS), and is a member of International Society of Military Academies (ISOMA).
