= Kaunas garrison mutiny =

Failed Lithuanian mutiny in Kaunas (1920)

- Part of the Lithuanian Wars of Independence
Date	22–23 February 1920
Location	Kaunas and Panemunė, Lithuania
Result	Mutiny suppressed

Belligerents
Rebellious soldiers	Lithuanian government

Commanders and leaders
Petras Mickeliūnas and 8 other members of the revolutionary committee	Pranas Liatukas; Antanas Merkys; Kazys Ladiga

Units involved
City kommandatura; 1st Cavalry Regiment; 2nd Reserve Battalion; Artillery Regiment	8th Infantry Regiment; 6th Infantry Regiment; 4th Infantry Regiment

Casualties and losses
2 killed 150 men put on trial 4 leaders executed	1 killed

Kaunas garrison mutiny (Lithuanian: Kauno įgulos maištas) or Panemunė rebellion (Lithuanian: Panemunės sukilimas) was a failed mutiny of Lithuanian soldiers stationed in Kaunas on 22–23 February 1920.

The Lithuanian Army was established in December 1918 and successfully pushed out the Bolsheviks (see the Lithuanian–Soviet War) and the Bermontians (see the Lithuanian–Bermontian War) by the end of 1919. As action at the frontlines ceased, soldiers stationed in Kaunas, the temporary capital of Lithuania, complained of poor living conditions and food provisions. There was also political dissatisfaction, particularly because soldiers were not allowed to vote in the upcoming elections to the Constituent Assembly of Lithuania.

In the morning of 22 February (Sunday), soldiers peacefully marched towards the Church of St. Michael the Archangel. They were met by Pranas Liatukas, supreme commander of the army. Liatukas promised to address soldiers' complaints and the soldiers returned to their stations. However, soldiers stationed in Panemunė (about 300 men from mainly the 2nd Reserve Battalion and the Artillery Regiment) were stopped and not allowed to attend the rally at the church. They returned to the barracks, detained their officers, and elected a nine-member revolutionary committee. When Liatukas arrived to Panemunė, he was detained. Assistant defence minister Antanas Merkys ordered units loyal to the government (mainly the 8th and 6th Infantry Regiments that saw action at the frontlines in 1919) to attack the mutineers. The assault, commanded by Kazys Ladiga, was delayed until the morning of 23 February. The mutiny was quickly suppressed. The unrest briefly spread to other units, including the aviation unit in Aleksotas where an American volunteer Samuel J. Harris was killed.

After the mutiny, Liatukas resigned from the command of the army. About 150 mutineers were tried. Four of them were executed on 12 March 1920. Others received various sentences, but were released after the Constituent Assembly of Lithuania announced a broad amnesty to political prisoners. The Lithuanian government worked to address soldiers' demands and complaints. Soldiers were granted voting rights and their living conditions were improved.

== Background ==
Lithuania declared independence in February 1918 but due to continued occupation by German forces was unable to start organizing its armed forces until December 1918 when the Lithuanian Wars of Independence broke out. Initially, the soldiers were volunteers but general mobilization was announced in March 1919. Lithuanians defended and successfully pushed out the Bolsheviks (see the Lithuanian–Soviet War) and the Bermontians (see the Lithuanian–Bermontian War) by the end of 1919. Therefore, there was a lull in the hostilities (the Polish–Lithuanian War broke out in July 1920).

Soldiers complained of lack of provisions, including food, as well as lack of hygiene and poor living conditions. There was also lack of discipline among soldiers and officers. Due to a budget crisis, soldier wages were paid late. According to memoirs of colonel Jonas Petraitis, it was a cold winter and soldiers froze both outside due to poor clothing and inside due to poor heating of barracks that needed repairs.

In days leading to the mutiny, several different proclamations were distributed among the soldiers. Soldiers also complained that they were not allowed to vote in the upcoming elections to the Constituent Assembly of Lithuania. Electoral law enacted in October 1919, allowed them to run in the election but not to vote. The only other group denied voting rights were criminals. Senior military leaders believed that granting voting rights to soldiers would encourage political polarization and would destroy unit's cohesion.

== Kaunas garrison ==
In February 1920, there were about 5,000 soldiers stationed in and near Kaunas. The units included:

- City kommandatura
- 1st Cavalry Regiment (3rd and 4th squadrons)
- Kaunas War School
- Military field police
- Aviation unit
- 8th Infantry Regiment
- 6th Infantry Regiment (1st battalion, electrotechnical and auto battalions)

Further units were stationed in Panemunė, suburb of Kaunas:

- 2nd Reserve Battalion
- Artillery Regiment (1st, 7th, and 8th batteries)
- 1st Separate Howitzer Battery

The 8th and 6th Infantry Regiments were earlier deployed in battles. Other units were stationed in Kaunas and did not see action. The regiments were located in Šančiai across the Nemunas from Panemunė.

== Mutiny ==
=== Preparations ===
The mutiny started spontaneously. Communist authors claimed that the mutiny was sparked by news of a strike by political prisoners held at Kaunas Prison and a communist proclamation printed on 16 February 1920 (Lithuania's Independence Day). On 20 February, soldiers of the city kommandatura went on strike. The following day, soldiers of the 2nd Reserve Battalion took control of the armory and armed themselves. About 200 soldiers from various units held a meeting which decided to gather near the Church of St. Michael the Archangel on Laisvės alėja. The soldiers planned to detain officers unless they supported the gathering, carry weapons and dress in combat uniforms, and to present demands to the government and the chief commander of the army Pranas Liatukas. However, the mutiny was more spontaneous, without clear leadership or well-defined demands.

The same day, on 21 February, city kommandant reported to the General Staff that soldiers planned an armed mutiny. Notably, military intelligence failed to detect the unrest and learned about the planned mutiny from the kommandant. At 5 p.m., Liatukas called a meeting of all unit commanders. Officers agreed that a mutiny was possible, except commanders of the 2nd Reserve Battalion and the Artillery Regiment denied any signs of unrest. Liatukas ordered to closely monitor soldiers moods and keep the General Staff informed.

Liatukas assigned an officer to monitor soldiers in Panemunė and to take all necessary actions to prevent them from marching to Kaunas (i.e. secure the Panemunė Bridge). That night, the bridge was secured by men from the 8th Infantry Regiment. Liatukas also ordered to ready four armored vehicles that were used by the Kaunas War School. There was a brief shootout in Šančiai between mutineers and soldiers attempting to deliver gasoline for the armored vehicles. Students from the Kaunas War School were issued weapons and sent to guard strategic objects (residence of the president, post and telegraph, Kaunas Prison, power plant, state bank).

=== Kaunas ===
In the morning of 22 February (Sunday), soldiers from the city kommandatura and the 1st Cavalry Regiment marched towards the Church of St. Michael the Archangel. Liatukas met them at 10 a.m. and received a 13-point demand list. The main demands were:

1. Grant soldiers voting rights in the upcoming elections to the Constituent Assembly
2. Release political prisoners who did not fight against Lithuania
3. Dismiss officers who did not speak Lithuanian
4. Improve soldiers' rations and living conditions, pay wages timely

Liatukas spoke with the soldiers for about an hour and promised to address their concerns. Appeased, the soldiers returned to their stations.

=== Panemunė ===
==== Mutiny spreads ====
Soldiers in Panemunė were not as easily appeased. At about 8 a.m. on 22 February, about 300 armed soldiers from the 2nd Reserve Battalion gathered to march towards Kaunas. They easily dispersed the armed guards posted on the Panemunė Bridge. Their path led by the barracks of the 8th and 6th Infantry Regiments. Soldiers from Panemunė attempted to convince the two regiments to join them. However, the regiments followed orders to halt and push back the men from the 2nd Reserve Battalion. After a brief shootout, soldiers from the reserve battalion dispersed or returned to Panemunė.

At about 10 a.m., soldiers from the Artillery Regiment detained their officers. The mutineers numbered about 300 men. The mutineers organized a nine-member revolutionary committee to lead the mutiny. It included Petras Mickeliūnas and Domininkas Vizgirdas. The revolutionary committee raised some political demands, including freeing political prisoners, concluding the peace treaty with the Soviets, recognizing soldiers' committees, granting voting rights to soldiers, nationalizing land owned by the nobility. Notably, there were no calls to overthrow the government or for a socialist revolution. Not all soldiers supported the committee or agreed to detain their officers.

Liatukas and his adjutant arrived to the barracks at noon of 22 February. He hoped to negotiate and arrive to a peaceful resolution like he had done at the Church of St. Michael the Archangel. However, Liatukas was detained. He then refused to negotiate explaining that he was no longer the chief commander of the army since his detention.

==== Government response ====
After Liatukas detention, the 8th and 6th Infantry Regiments began taking defensive positions against a possible push by Panemunė soldiers towards Kaunas. Kaunas was placed under the state of siege (lifted the following day). At around 3 p.m., assistant defence minister Antanas Merkys and officer Konstantinas Kleščinskis arrived at the staff of the 8th Infantry Regiment. He called the rebels and demanded the release of Liatukas. When the rebels refused, Merkys ceased negotiations and ordered the 8th Infantry Regiment to take military action against the rebels.

The first shootout occurred at about 6 p.m. However, further confrontation was delayed until next morning. The mutineers attempted to use artillery, but the shots were very inaccurate as artillery officers were detained. Men loyal to the government had technical difficulties with the armored vehicles while crossing the frozen Nemunas without proper cover was too risky. Regardless, the armored vehicles had a psychological impact on the rebellious soldiers sowing further confusion and panic. It was the first time that the Lithuanian forces used armored vehicles in combat. Government forces called two companies from the 4th Infantry Regiment then located in Kaišiadorys.

==== Mutiny suppressed ====
During the night, many soldiers from Panemunė escaped to nearby villages. Two soldiers from the 1st battery attempted to remove mortars from the base so that they could not be used by the mutineers, but were stopped. During the night, government forces were able to learn about the strength and attack plans of the mutineers. If they could not hold out in Panemunė, they planned to escape to Alytus and join forces with the 1st Infantry Regiment.

At around 6 a.m. on 23 February, government forces began their attack across Nemunas towards Panemunė. Men from the 4th Infantry Regiment were to cross Nemunas downstream and flank the rebels from Rokai while the soldiers from the 8th and 6th Infantry Regiments attacked directly. The attack was commanded by Kazys Ladiga. The mutineers did not put fierce resistance and by 11 a.m., loyal forces took control of Panemunė. Many rebellious soldiers escaped, surrendered, or went into hiding. Men from the 1st Cavalry Regiment and the 4th Infantry Regiment were sent to pursue soldiers who tried to escape towards Prienai.

=== Aleksotas and elsewhere ===
In the evening of 22 February, soldiers from the aviation unit armed themselves in Aleksotas. Unit's commander Vincas Gavelis gathered loyal soldiers to suppress the mutiny on 23 February. He was reinforced by two armored vehicles sent by the government. One of these vehicles was driven by Joseph Esebuis Pereira, British RAF officer who worked as instructor of the Lithuanian Army. During the shootout, one rebel was killed and two were injured. On the government side, Samuel J. Harris, an American volunteer, was killed. The mutiny was quickly suppressed; some mutineers attempted to escape towards Garliava.

The unrest also spread to other units stationed outside of Kaunas, but it was short lived. For example, soldiers of the 6th battery of the Artillery Regiment stationed near Žiežmariai detained their commander and attempted to incite men from the 4th Infantry Regiment to join them. The unrest also spread to Šiauliai, but the situation was normalized by 24 February.

== Trials ==
On 28 February 1920, a commission was established to investigate the mutiny. It included chairman Augustinas Voldemaras, prosecutor Rapolas Skipitis, interrogator Julius Rimša, attorneys Jokūbas Šernas and Vladas Stašinskas. A five-member military court, chaired by Bronius Žvinys, was officially convened on 29 February. The court heard the cases from 2 March to 27 May. On 4 March, the criminal code was amended to provide death penalty for armed mutiny. However, on 28 May 1920, the Constituent Assembly announced a broad amnesty to political poisoners and the mutineers were released.

About 150 men were tried for their role in the mutiny. Four members of the revolutionary committee (Balys Banišauskas, Maksas Kušneris, Petras Mickeliūnas, and Domininkas Vizgirdas) were sentenced to death and executed on 12 March 1920 in the basement of Kaunas Prison. Six others were sentenced to death but their sentences were commuted to life imprisonment or were voided by the general amnesty. One soldier was sentenced to life imprisonment and one soldier received 15 years in prison. Other sentences ranged from six years to one month in prison. 45 men were acquitted. Of the 13 men who received the harshest sentences, six were volunteers and not conscripts.

After the amnesty and release from prison, the men were assigned to a work battalion stationed in Eglaitė. The battalion mutinied again, but it was a local and isolated incident.

== Aftermath ==
Liatukas was freed from detention and immediately submitted his resignation to the President of Lithuania. He was replaced by general Silvestras Žukauskas who was more popular among the soldiers. According to modern Lithuanian authors, the mutiny left three dead, one on the government side (Samuel J. Harris) and two on the mutineer side. At least five soldiers from the 6th Infantry Regiment were injured. According to a communist newspaper from 17 April 1920, the casualties numbered 14 dead and 37 injured. For their role in suppressing the mutiny, two senior lieutenants from the 8th Infantry Regiment Stasys Rekašius and Silvestras Leonas were promoted to captains. 15 soldiers from the 8th Infantry regiment were awarded the Order of the Cross of Vytis.

Lithuanian forces successfully used armored vehicles for the first time. Though they were manned by haphazardly assembled crews, they proved to be effective particularly because of the psychological impact on soldiers' morale. Therefore, the government decided to organize a separate armored vehicle unit on 1 March 1920. On 26 February 1920, the government announced demobilization of junior officers (their mobilization was initially announced on 15 January 1919). The 8th battery of the Artillery Regiment, as the most active unit in the mutiny, was first reorganized into a reserve unit and then fully dissolved in July 1920.

The Lithuanian government took soldiers' complaints seriously and worked to address them. The martial law was lifted on 1 March 1920 (it was reinstated in July 1920 due to the Polish–Lithuanian War). On 7 March 1920, the government announced that soldiers could vote in the election to the Constituent Assembly and the law was amended on 25 March. The government even lowered age requirements for soldiers from 21 to 17 to ensure that all soldiers were eligible. However, internal military orders prohibited political agitation, distribution of proclamations, or participation in political meetings. The government also worked to improve food and living conditions. Wages were paid more regularly.

The Communist Party of Lithuania supported the mutiny and intensified its propaganda activities among soldiers. In May 1920, it began publishing secret newspaper Kareivių tiesa aimed at the soldiers. On 11 July 1920, Lithuanian intelligence arrested 24 soldiers for participating in a communist organization and planning another mutiny. Their leader Jurgis Kundrotas was sentenced to death, but his sentence was commuted to life imprisonment.

== Historiography ==
The government portrayed the mutiny as sponsored and funded by Lithuania's external enemies (Soviet Russia and Poland). The event was usually not mentioned in works of interwar historians. Only in 1940, Zenonas Ivinskis published a more detailed study based on reports of the Lithuanian government.

The mutiny received a lot more attention from communist writers. In 1924, Vincas Mickevičius-Kapsukas published a separate 39-page booklet in Smolensk about the mutiny. He did not have access to archival or court data, therefore his work contains many factual inaccuracies but it established ideological framework for future communist writers. While he admitted that the Communist Party of Lithuania did not participate in the mutiny, he portrayed the event as an expression of the class conflict between soldiers and bourgeois officers and government officials. Soviet authors considered it a "big mistake" that the communist party did not take leadership position in organizing and directing the mutiny.

In 1955, historian Juozas Jurginis published a communist study on the mutiny based on archival documents. His study was corrected in several aspects by Stasys Lazutka and Aldona Kuliešiuvienė in 1969.

== Bibliography ==
- Balkelis, Tomas (2018). War, Revolution, and Nation-Making in Lithuania, 1914–1923. Oxford University Press. ISBN 978-0-19-966802-1.
- Čepėnas, Pranas (1986). Naujųjų laikų Lietuvos istorija. Vol. II. Chicago: Dr. Kazio Griniaus Fondas. OCLC 3220435.
- Černevičiūtė, Sigita (2016). "Politinių nusikaltimų samprata Lietuvoje 1919–1940 m." Teisė (in Lithuanian). 99: 151–173. ISSN 2424-6050.
- Ivinskis, Zenonas (1940). "Šarvuotas auto divizionas". Karo Archyvas (in Lithuanian). XII: 151–182.
- Jurevičiūtė, Aušra (2020). "Lietuvos kariuomenė Steigiamojo Seimo rinkimų išvakarėse ir rinkimų įstatymo pakeitimas". Parlamento Studijos (in Lithuanian). 29: 46–81. ISSN 1822-749X.
- Jurevičiūtė, Aušra (2021). "Apie 1920 m. įvykius Lietuvos kariuomenėje ir atsiminimų autorių Matą Klikną". Karo Archyvas (in Lithuanian). 36 (1): 203–205. doi:10.47459/ka.2021.36.7.
- Kilinskas, Kęstutis (2017). "Karininkų, kareivių ir karo valdininkų dalyvavimo steigiamojo seimo rinkimuose problema ir jos sprendimas 1919–1920 metais". Lietuvos istorijos studijos (in Lithuanian). 40: 23–36. doi:10.15388/LIS.2017.40.11608. ISSN 1648-9101.
- Lazutka, Stasys; Kuliešiuvienė, Aldona (1969). "Kauno įgulos kareivių sukilimas 1920 metais. (Istoriografija ir kai kurie klausimai)". Lietuvos TSR aukštųjų mokyklų mokslo darbai. Istorija (in Lithuanian). 10: 79–99.
- Liatukaitė-Černienė, Vanda Eleonora (2004). "Lietuvos kario ir jo šeimos istorija. Generolas leitenantas Pranas Liatukas". In Misius, Kazys (ed.). Kvėdarna (PDF). Lietuvos valsčiai (in Lithuanian). Vilnius: Versmė. ISBN 978-9955-589-97-6.
- Lukšas, Aras (20 February 2009). "Maištas ar sukilimas?". Lietuvos žinios (in Lithuanian).
- Šarmaitis, Romas, ed. (1971). Lietuvos Komunistų partijos istorijos apybraiža (in Lithuanian). Vol. I. Vilnius: Mintis.
- Statkus, Vytenis (1986). Lietuvos ginkluotos pajėgos 1918–1940 m. (in Lithuanian). Chicago: Vydūno jaunimo fondas. OCLC 24628104.
- Stoliarovas, Andriejus (2016). "Vidiniai neramumai Lietuvos Respublikoje 1919–1940 metais". Acta historica universitatis Klaipedensis (in Lithuanian). 32: 97–114. ISSN 2351-6526.
- Stoliarovas, Andriejus (2019). "Lietuvos kariuomenės šarvuotieji automobiliai 1919–1940 m." (PDF). Vytauto Didžiojo karo muziejus 2018 metais (in Lithuanian): 129–153. ISSN 2029-3259.
- Surgailis, Gintautas (1992). Lietuvos kariuomenės vadai (in Lithuanian). Vilnius: Mintis. ISBN 5-417-00513-4.
- Surgailis, Gintautas (2015). Ketvirtasis pėstininkų Lietuvos karaliaus Mindaugo pulkas (PDF) (in Lithuanian). Vilnius: Generolo Jono Žemaičio Lietuvos karo akademija. ISBN 978-609-8074-50-5.
- Surgailis, Gintautas (2019). Šeštasis pėstininkų Pilėnų kunigaikščio Margio pulkas (PDF) (in Lithuanian). Vilnius: Generolo Jono Žemaičio Lietuvos karo akademija. ISBN 978-609-8074-79-6.
- Surgailis, Gintautas (2022). Aštuntasis pėstininkų Kauno kunigaikščio Vaidoto pulkas (PDF) (in Lithuanian). Vilnius: Generolo Jono Žemaičio Lietuvos karo akademija. ISBN 978-609-8277-30-2.
