= Antanas Juozapavičius =

Lithuanian army officer

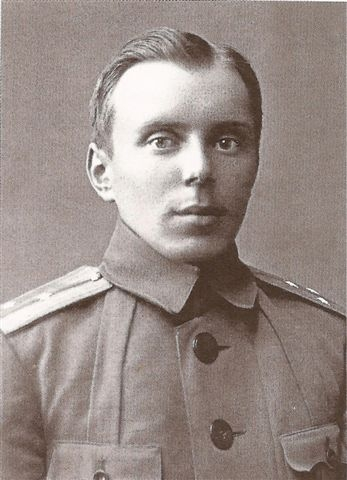
- Antanas Juozapavičius
- Born: 13 February 1894; Švokštonys manor, Vaškai county, Russian Empire
- Died: 13 February 1919 (aged 25); Alytus, Republic of Lithuania
- Burial place: Alytus cemetery
- Military career
- Allegiance: Russian Empire (1915–1917) Republic of Lithuania (1918–1919)
- Service years: 1915–1919
- Rank: Poruchik

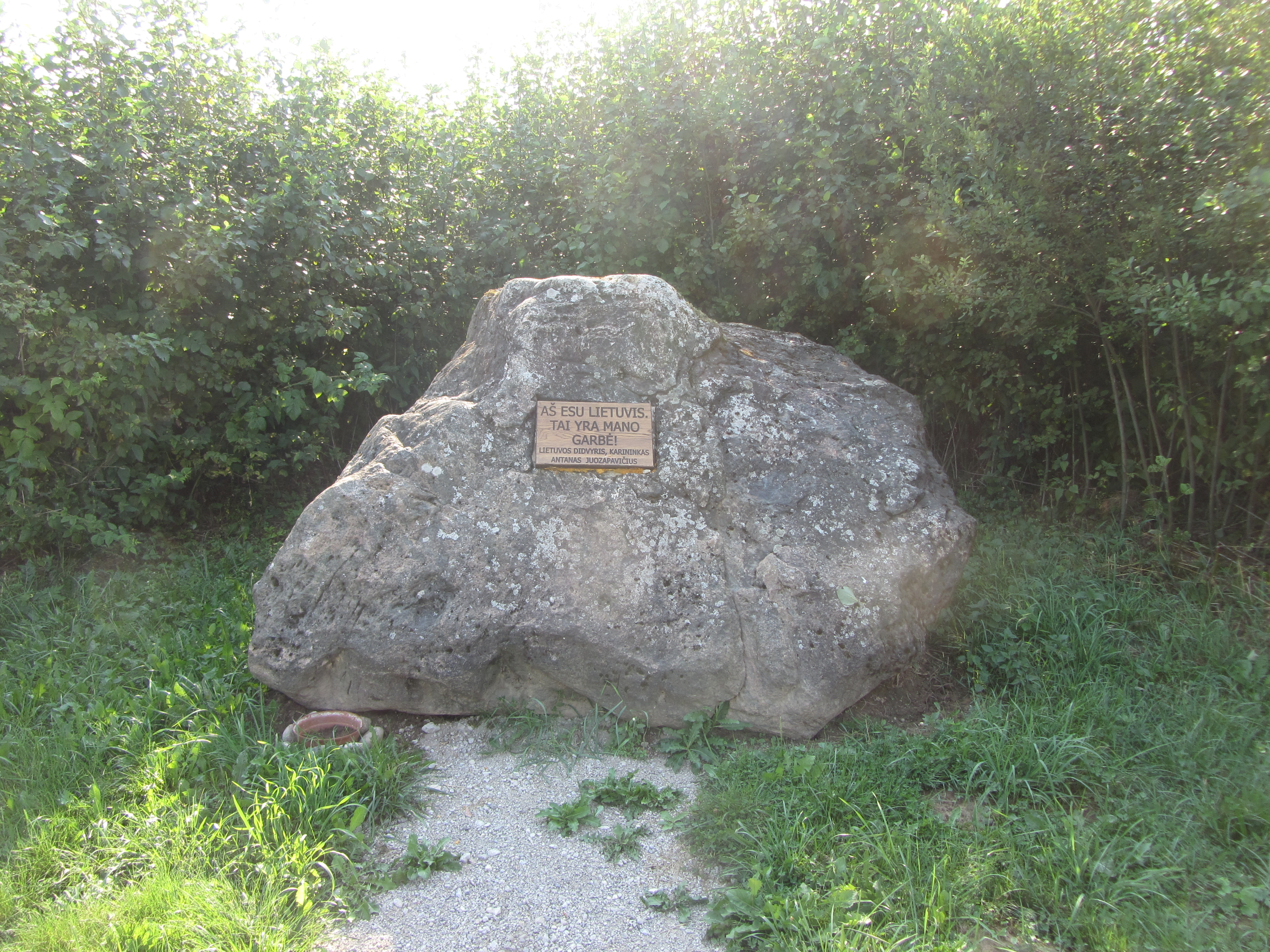
Memorial stone at the foot of the Juozapinė mountain, with the words of Antanas Juozapavičius "I am Lithuanian. That is my honour" inscribed on it.

Antanas Juozapavičius (13 February 1894 – 13 February 1919) was the first officer of the Army of the Republic of Lithuania to die while fighting in the Lithuanian Wars of Independence.

== Biography ==
Antanas Juozapavičius was born to Juozapas Juozapavičius and his wife Marijona Juozapavičienė. He was born in the small Švakštonys manor, which the parents were renting. As farming was financially unsuccessful, the family moved to Riga, where Juozapas Juozapavičius worked as a wagoner.

In 1902, Antanas Juozapavičius started going to school in Riga, and from 1905 to Riga's Alexander II Boys' Gymnasium, although he was thrown out of school in sixth grade for the spreading of Lithuanian ideas. In Tartu, he educated to become a pharmacist, and from 1914 onwards worked as such in the pharmacies of Riga and Tartu.

== World War I ==
Juozapavičius enlisted as a volunteer of the Imperial Russian Army in 1915. After a few months, he was sent to the Moscow military school, graduating as a praporshchik, after which he was assigned to the 57th Infantry Regiment in Tver. In 1916, he completed the machine gunner's school in Gatchina and promptly returned to his regiment.

=== In the ranks of the Latvian Riflemen ===
In the end of 1916, on his request, he transferred to the 6th Tukums Latvian Riflemen Regiment, as he knew Latvian. He was injured during the Christmas Battles and subsequently treated in Riga. He was awarded the 4th class of the Order of Saint Anna.

=== After the February Revolution ===
In June 1917, he was active in the committee for the organisation of Lithuanian military units in Smolensk. On 26 November 1917, he was the commander of the 4th company of the Special Lithuanian Battalion and temporarily the commander of the Separate Lithuanian Battalion, which was disbanded on 15 March 1918.

== Lithuanian Wars of Independence ==
Juozapavičius returned to Lithuania in June 1918. On 24 November 1918, he became an adjutant of the country's Defence Minister Augustinas Voldemaras. Later he was assigned to the 1st Infantry Regiment, which was moved from Vilnius to Alytus on 18 December 1918. When Jonas Galvydis-Bykauskas and Kazys Ladiga, who disapproved of the former's leadership, were removed from the regiment, Juozapavičius was made the temporary regimental commander on 4 February 1919.

== Death ==
Juozapavičius was wounded on the bridge of Alytus during the Battle of Alytus on his 25th birthday, when the regiment had to retreat for fear of encirclement, as the neighbouring allied German soldiers unexpectedly retreated. However, Lithuanians quickly retook control of Alytus.

== Burial ==
He was buried on 14 February 1919 in the churchyard of St. Louis Church of Alytus. On 28 April 1919, he was ceremoniously reburied in the cemetery of Alytus, next to the St Guardian Angels Church of Alytus.
