= Lithuanian–Bermontian War =

1919 war

- Part of the Lithuanian Wars of Independence
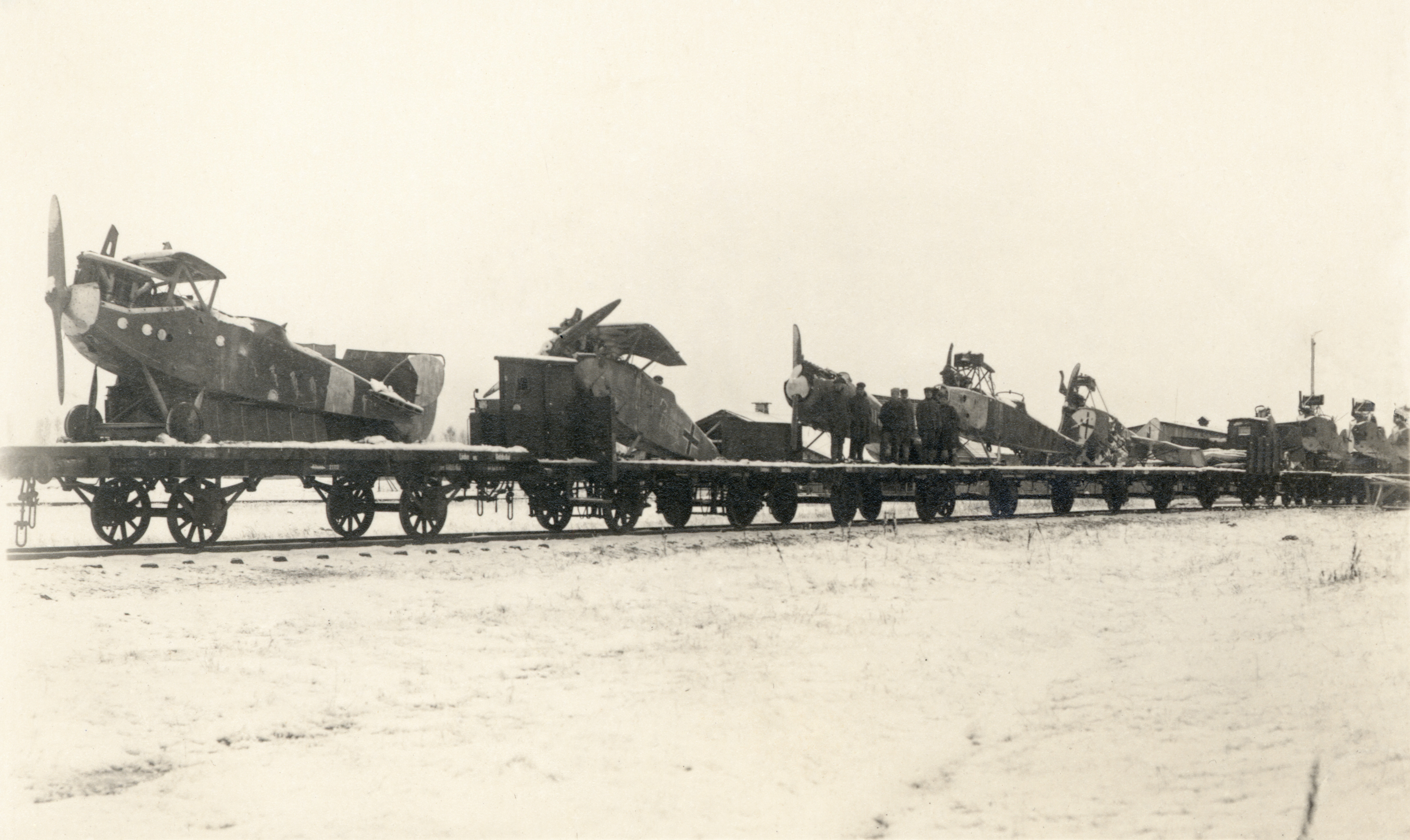
- Bermontian planes, captured by the Lithuanian Armed Forces after the Battle of Radviliškis
Date	July–December 1919
Location	Lithuania
Result	Lithuanian victory

Belligerents
Lithuania	West Russian Volunteer Army

Commanders and leaders
(Lithuania) Kazys Ladiga	Pavel Bermondt-Avalov

Strength
Unknown	52,000 men with artillery and planes (unused)

The Lithuanian–Bermontian War was fought between Lithuania and the West Russian Volunteer Army from July 1919 to December 1919.

== Background ==
Bermontians, named after their Leader Pavel Bermondt-Avalov, were operating in Latvia before attacking Lithuania. At first, the German part of the army (Freikorps and the Baltische Landeswehr) was on the side of Latvia, even retaking Riga from the Bolsheviks in 1919. This changed when the Entente demanded that the Germans retreat to Germany. They rejected that and merged into Bermondt's unit; later, they started fighting against the Latvians. In July 1919 Freikorps, which would later merge into Bermondt's unit, crossed the Latvian-Lithuanian Border and took the town of Kuršėnai. This began the War between the Russian-German army and Lithuania.

== During the war ==
By September, the Bermontians had already occupied almost all of Samogitia. They occupied towns like Šiauliai, Radviliškis, Raseiniai and earlier mentioned Kuršėnai. First skirmishes between the Bermontians and Lithuania occurred in September near Kuršėnai. One source reports that in a gymnasium in Šiauliai, Avalov's army beat up children and the headmaster. According to another source, on 31 October around 200 Bermontian soldiers raided Jurbarkas, plundered the custom house, stole 3000 gold coins, disarmed the police, robbed shops, stole horses from farmers and terrorized the citizens. Bermontians were known for pillaging the lands they occupied; the population then started forming Partisan forces against them, which were sometimes successful. After occupying a town, the Bermontians inforced a law that would make the Russian language the only allowed language to use. In Šiauliai city, part of a district of Lithuanian military activities under the leadership of commander Adolfas Birontas, the Bermontians on October 9 early in the morning unexpectedly attacked the units of the Lithuanian army in the city, disarmed and robbed the soldiers and barracks, liquidated the Lithuanian commandant's office, looted the post office, the treasury, desecrated the Lithuanian national flag, abolished government and municipal institutions, ordered them to use only Russian or German language and declared that Lithuania is a Russian land

== Lithuanian counteroffensive ==
On 21 November, at 3 PM, the 2nd Infantry Regiment began their attack in the direction of Šiauliai, with the first battalion forwarding the attack. Stasys Butkus, a soldier volunteer, recalled that the day was marked by heavy snowing, during which his contingent was led by a local Lithuanian farmer who showed them the trail. Lieutenant Serafinas Oželas managed to break through into Radviliškis, briefly capturing the cemetery before retreating due to a lack of support. Oželis sustained heavy injuries and died soon after. He would be later awarded the Cross of Vytis. Around 9 PM another attack commenced but failed due to stiff resistance from the enemy. Later, commander Ladiga decided to call up the reserve consisting of the 1st Infantry Regiment's third battalion and a part of the first battalion. The new offensive commenced on 22 November, 7 AM. Artillery support suppressed enemy fire as small parts of the army broke into the city and fell back. The Bermontians subsequently retreated from the city.

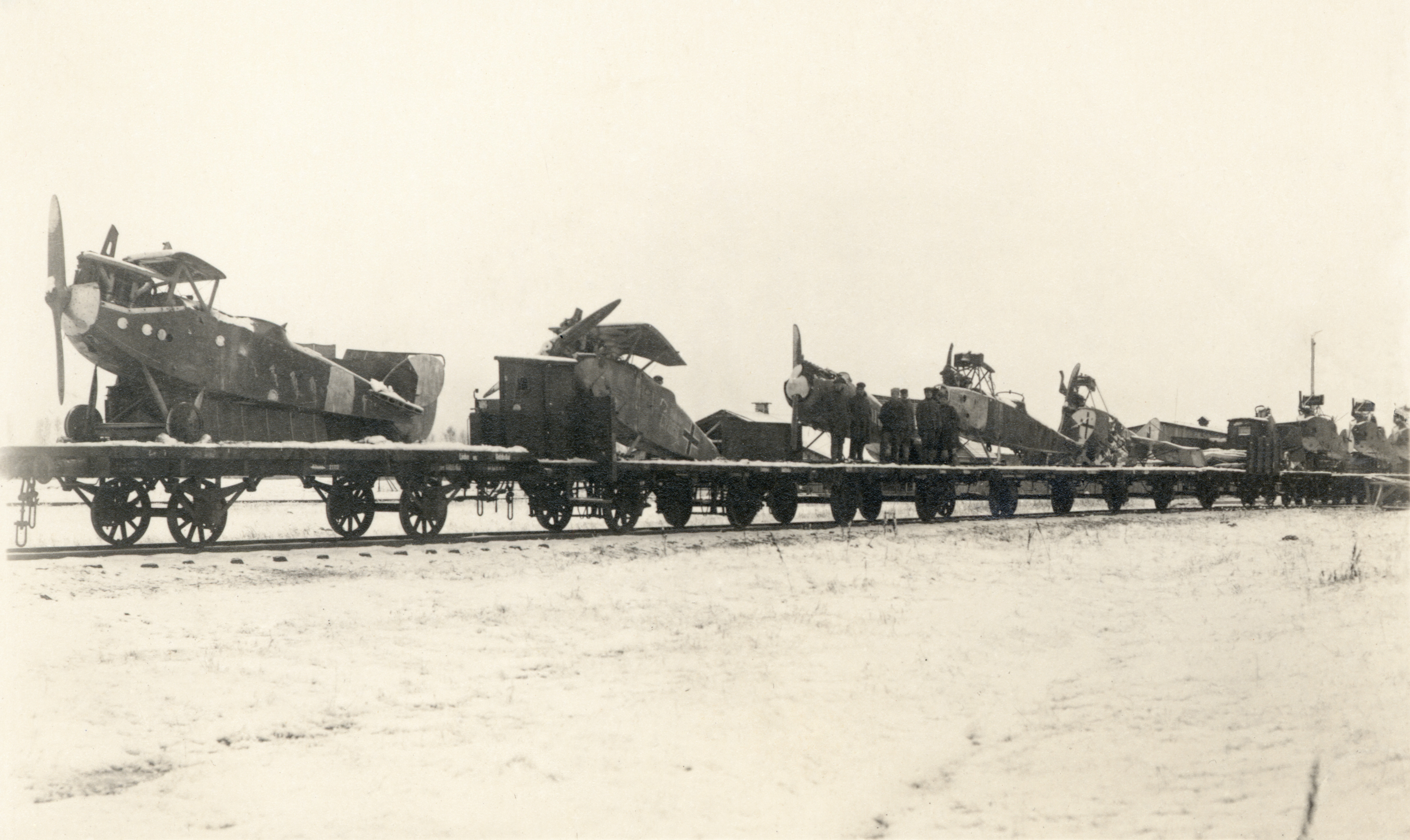
Bermontian planes captured by the Lithuanian army after the Battle of Radviliškis

== Aftermath of the counteroffensive ==
The result of this battle meant that the Bermontians would retreat from all Baltic states. So they did; French delegate, Henri Niessel, who was sent to Lithuania to stop the war between Lithuanians and Bermontians, demanded to halt the fights against Bermontians, and how they should be safely evacuated back to Germany. Bermontians retreated from Lithuania to Tilsit (then Weimar Republic), Bermondt-Avalov himself fled to Klaipėda. By 15 December, the West Russian Volunteer Army was completely removed from Lithuania.
