= 11th Army Corps (France) =

11e Corps de Armée
- Active: 1870-1940
- Country: France
- Type: Army Corps
- Engagements: World War II

Commanders
- Notable commanders: Charles Mangin; Louis de Maud'huy; Henri Niessel

The 11th Army Corps was a unit of the French Army that was created in 1870 and fought in the Franco-Prussian War, the First World War and in the early battles of the Second World War.

After Erwin Rommel's Panzer Divisions crossed the Meuse in late May 1940, the 11th Corps infantry were over-run.

== Commanders ==
=== Franco Prussian War ===
- 1870 : général d'Aurelle de Paladines.

=== World War I ===
- 5 November 1912 : général Lanrezac
- 10 April 1914 : général Eydoux
- 10 February 1915 : général Baumgarten
- 4 June 1916 : général Mangin
- 19 December 1916 : général Muteau
- 25 January 1917 : général de Maud'Huy
- 3 June 1918 : général Niessel
- 19 July 1918 : général Prax

=== World War II ===
- 1939 - 1940 Géneral Martin
