= Kazys Ladiga =

Lithuanian general

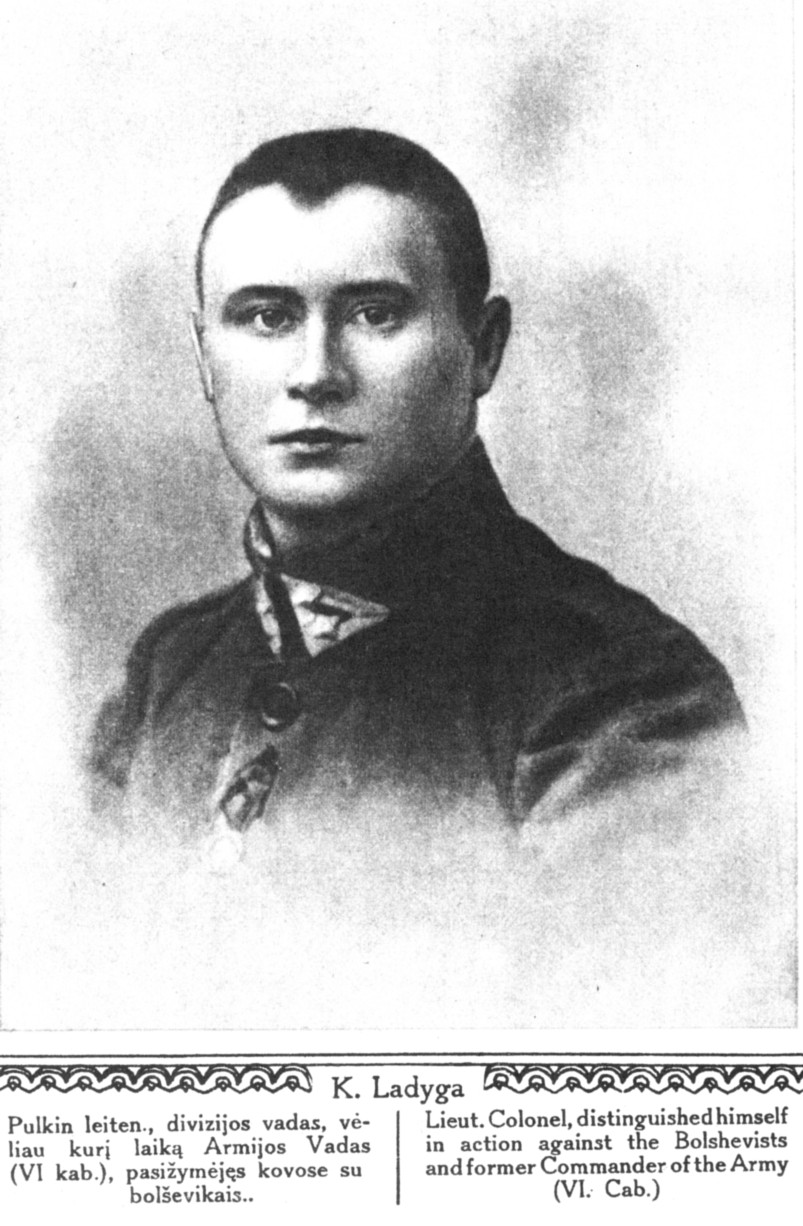
- Born: 6 January 1894; Iškonys, Russian Empire
- Died: 19 December 1941 (aged 47); Sol-Iletsk, Soviet Union
- Cause of death: Execution by NKVD
- Education: Military Academy in Vilnius; ETH Zurich; War College (Prague)
- Spouse: Stefanija Ladigienė
- Children: 6
- Military career
- Allegiance: Russian Empire (1914–1918); Lithuania (1918–1927)
- Rank: General
- Commands: 1st Infantry Regiment; 4th Infantry Division; 3rd Infantry Division; Chief of the General Staff
- Conflicts: World War I Lithuanian Wars of Independence
- Awards: Order of Saint George; Order of the Cross of Vytis

Kazys Ladiga or Ladyga (6 January 1894 – 19 December 1941) was a Lithuanian general and one of the first volunteer officers of the Lithuanian Army.

Upon graduating from the Military Academy in Vilnius, Ladiga served in the Imperial Russian Army during World War I and earned the rank of captain. He returned to Lithuania in 1918 and volunteered to the newly formed Lithuanian Army. He was appointed as the commander of the 1st Infantry Regiment. Ladiga quickly rose through the ranks and commanded the Vilkmergė Group in the Lithuanian–Soviet War. He also led units in the Lithuanian–Bermontian War (Battle of Radviliškis) and in the Polish–Lithuanian War (Battle of Sejny). After an unsuccessful campaign in September 1920, Ladiga was demoted to commander of the 4th Infantry Division. After the Lithuanian Wars of Independence, he continued military studies in Switzerland and Czechoslovakia. He rose to the rank of a general and briefly served as the Chief of the General Staff in 1925–1926. He was forced to retire from active military duty after the military coup of December 1926.

When Lithuania was occupied by the Soviet Union in June 1940, Ladiga was arrested and sentenced to death. He was executed in December 1941.

== Biography ==
=== Russian Empire ===
Ladiga was born on 6 January 1894 [O.S. 25 December 1893] in Iškonys near Biržai to a family of farmers. After graduating from a four-year primary school in Biržai, he enrolled at a private gymnasium of Michail Pavlovsky in Vilnius in 1909. As a student he joined Aušrininkai, a semi-formal Lithuanian student society. He planned to study agronomy at the Kyiv Polytechnic Institute, but after the outbreak of World War I he enrolled at the Military Academy in Vilnius.

He graduated in December 1914 as praporshchik and was assigned to the 70th Ryazhsk Infantry Regiment of the 18th Infantry Division. He served in intelligence units deployed near Daugavpils. He earned promotion to captains and was awarded seven orders. He was seriously injured twice. Ladiga was captured by the Germans during the Operation Faustschlag in early 1918. He spent eight months in various POW camps. In late 1918, the camp was visited by Konstantinas Olšauskas who tries to recruit Lithuanian POWs to join the newly established Lithuanian Army. Ladiga was one of the first volunteers.

=== Lithuanian Wars of Independence ===
In November 1918, Ladiga returned to his native village and organized a group of about 150 local men to protect against various roaming gangs of demobilized soldiers. On 12 December 1918, Ladiga officially joined the 1st Infantry Regiment and was appointed commander of its first battalion. After the outbreak of the Lithuanian–Soviet War, the regiment relocated to Alytus. Several officers, including Ladiga, signed a letter asking to replace regiment's commander Jonas Galvydis-Bykauskas with someone who showed more enthusiasm and initiative. Upon learning of this letter, Galvydis-Bykauskas attempted to replace Ladiga with Julius Čaplikas and challenged them to duel when they refused to follow orders.

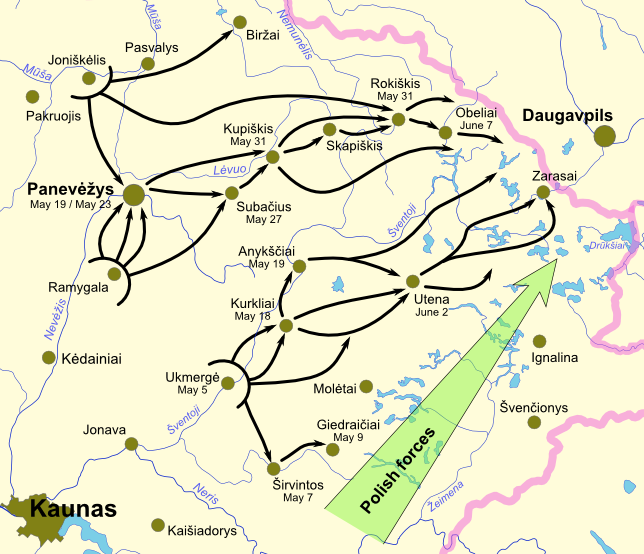
Lithuanian offensive in May–June 1919. The Vilkmergė (Ukmergė) Group was commanded by Ladiga

After this conflict, Galvydis-Bykauskas was assigned as the director of the War School of Kaunas and Antanas Juozapavičius became the acting commander of the 1st Infantry Regiment. However, Juozapavičius was killed on 13 February 1919 becoming the first Lithuanian officer to die in the Lithuanian Wars of Independence. Ladiga returned to the regiment and was officially appointed its commander on 6 March 1919. Under his command, the 1st Infantry Regiment participated in the first organized Lithuanian offensive on 3–8 April 1919 in hopes of capturing Vilnius.

In summer 1919, Ladiga commanded the Vilkmergė Group which attacked Bolshevik forces. This group captured Utena on 2 June and Zarasai on 25 August 1919. In October 1919, Ladiga was redeployed to fight in the Lithuanian–Bermontian War. He commanded the Lithuanian units in the Battle of Radviliškis that pushed out Bermontians from Lithuania. He was promoted to lieutenant colonel on 18 October 1919.

In January 1920, Ladiga became commander of the 1st Infantry Division. On 23 February 1920, Ladiga commanded forces loyal to the government in the attack against soldiers who rebelled in Panemunė. The mutiny was quickly suppressed. On 17 July 1920, Ladiga commanded the division on its march into Vilnius (then under Soviet control but recognized as Lithuania's territory in the Soviet–Lithuanian Peace Treaty).

On 23 August 1920, Ladiga replaced Stasys Nastopka and became the first assistant minister of defence and the acting commander of the Lithuanian Army. He led the Lithuanian forces in the Battle of Sejny that resulted in a defeat. Ladiga resigned as the commander of the army on 1 October. On 14 October 1920, a few days after the Żeligowski's Mutiny, he was appointed commander of the 4th Infantry Division which he commanded until 1921.

=== Post-war ===
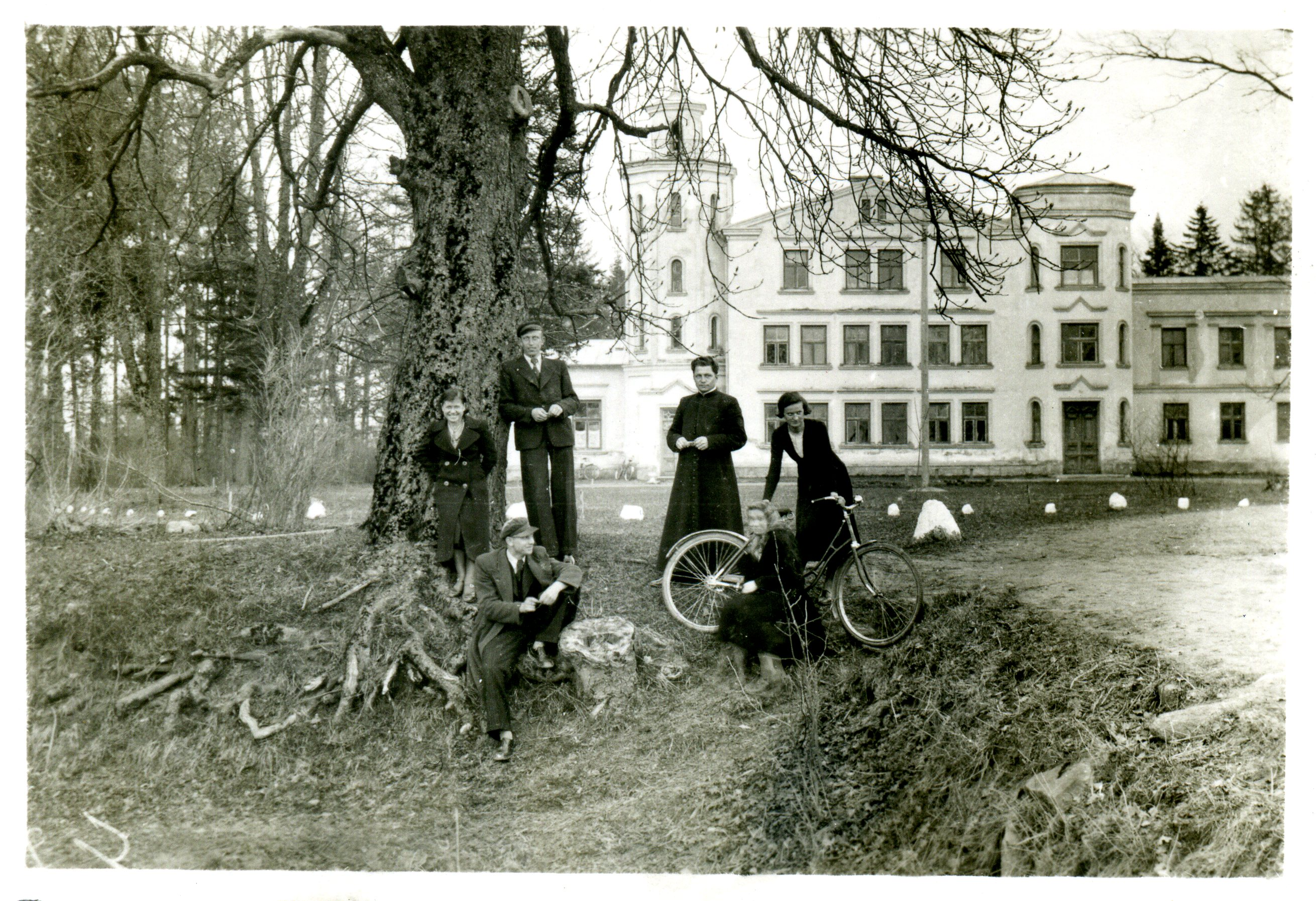
Gulbinėnai Manor in 1939

Ladiga studied at the Military Academy of ETH Zurich in November 1921 – March 1922 and War College (Prague) in 1922–1923. In October 1923, he was appointed commander of the 3rd Infantry Division. On 7 May 1925, he became the Chief of the General Staff. A week later he was promoted to general. He continued to lead the General Staff until 22 June 1926 (with a month-long break in September–October 1925 due to disagreement with defence minister Teodoras Daukantas). He was removed as the Chief of the General Staff after the election to the Third Seimas was won by the left-wing Lithuanian Popular Peasants' Union and Social Democratic Party of Lithuania. He was then appointed as officer for special affairs under the Minister of Defence.

Ladiga participated in organizing the coup d'état of December 1926 against the government of President Kazys Grinius. Three days after the coup, he became the commander of the 2nd Infantry Division. He was assigned as director of the 2nd military district in February 1927 and of the 3rd military district in May 1927. However, he sympathized with the Lithuanian Christian Democratic Party, the main opponents of the authoritarian regime of President Antanas Smetona. Thus, disciplinary action was taken for "publicly insulting superiors" and Ladiga was released from the military on 24 August 1927. There were rumors that Ladiga said that he installed Smetona and he will remove him. For some time, Ladiga lived under house arrest.

=== Manor owner ===
Ladiga lived and worked at the Gulbinėnai Manor near Pasvalys. The manor was nationalized from the Karp family in 1924 according to the Lithuanian Land Reform of 1922. The manor was given to Ladiga since he volunteered for the army in 1918. He then purchased more land and created a large farm that produced meat and dairy products. The land included about 50 ha (120 acres) of arable land, as well as a 16-hectare (40-acre) park and 4-hectare (9.9-acre) orchard. He improved roads, established a post office, built a windmill and a dairy. In 1936, Ladiga established a chapel. A parish was officially recognized in 1938. According to a Soviet inventory from 1940, Ladiga owned about 80 hectares (200 acres) of land. The manor had a total of 12 buildings, including a smithy and windmill. The manor owned five horses, twenty cows, and seven pigs. At other times, the manor owned 30 cows and 60 pigs.

In 1937–1940, with interruptions, he worked at the Vytautas the Great War Museum in Kaunas. He also contributed articles to Mūsų laikraštis and XX amžius.

=== Soviet prisoner ===
When Lithuania was occupied by the Soviet Union in June 1940, Ladiga was arrested by the NKVD on 12 August 1940. He was held in prisons in Biržai and Panevėžys. At the start of the German invasion of the Soviet Union, Ladiga was evacuated to Russia. He was sentenced to death on 29 October 1941 and executed in the NKVD Prison No. 2 in Sol-Iletsk on 19 December 1941. His place of burial is unknown.

== Personal life ==
In 1920, Ladiga married Stefanija Paliulytė. They had six children, including artists Marija Ladigaitė-Vildžiūnienė. His grandson Tomas Ladiga is an opera singer. Another grandson Andrew Eiva is a U.S. military officer. Stefanija was elected to the Third Seimas in 1925. During World War II, she helped hide and rescue Irena Veisaitė, a Jewish girl from the Kovno Ghetto, for which she was recognized as a Righteous Among the Nations. She was arrested by the NKVD in March 1946 and imprisoned in a Gulag until 1957.

== Awards ==
Ladiga received the following awards for his military service:

- Order of Saint Anna (2nd, 3rd, and 4th degrees)
- Order of Saint Stanilaus (2nd and 3rd degrees)
- Order of Saint Vladimir (4th degree)
- Order of Saint George (4th degree)
- Order of the Cross of Vytis (4th and 5th degrees in 1919)
- Czechoslovak War Cross 1918 (1926)
- Independence Medal (Lithuania) (1928)
