= Jonas Galvydis-Bykauskas =

Lithuanian military officer (1864–1943)

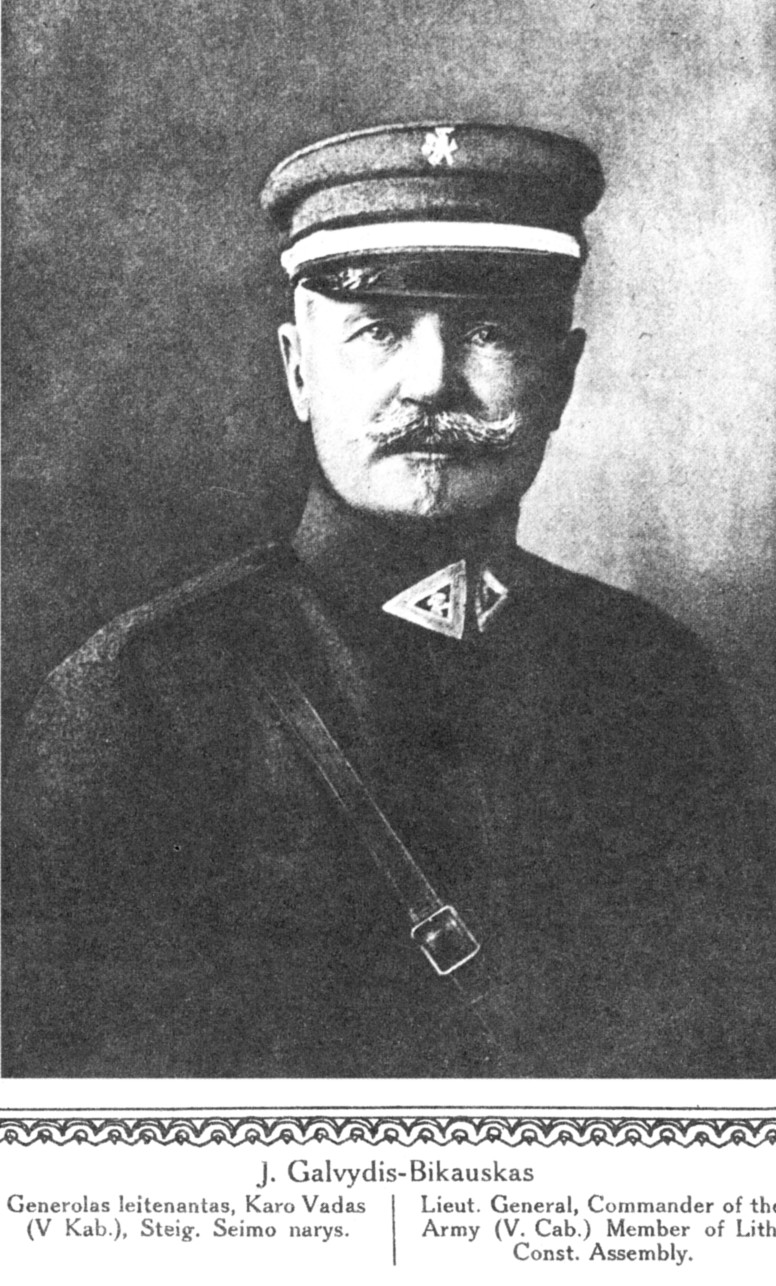
- Galvydis-Bykauskas in Lietuvos albumas
- Born: 15 December 1864; Degėsiai, Russian Empire
- Died: 16 July 1943 (aged 78); Kaunas, Lithuania
- Military career
- Allegiance: Russian Empire (1885–1918); Lithuania (1918–1926)
- Branch: Russian Imperial Army; Lithuanian Army
- Rank: Lieutenant general (1919); General
- Commands: 1st Infantry Regiment; 3rd Division; Lithuanian Army; 2nd Division
- Conflicts: World War I Lithuanian Wars of Independence
- Awards: Order of the Cross of Vytis

Jonas Galvydis-Bykauskas (15 December 1864 – 16 July 1943) was a Lithuanian general who served in the Imperial Russian Army and the Lithuanian Army. He was the supreme commander of the Lithuanian Army from 9 April to 7 July 1920.

Galvydis-Bykauskas joined the Russian Imperial Army in 1885. He graduated from the Saint Petersburg Infantry Cadet School and the Officers' Rifle School. In 1911, he was assigned to the 18th Siberian Rifle Regiment with which he fought in World War I. He was promoted to colonel and became regiment's commander, but was captured by the Germans in January 1916 and kept in POW camps until early 1918.

He returned to Lithuania and joined the newly established Lithuanian Army becoming the commander of the 1st Infantry Regiment in November 1918. However, in early January 1919, after a conflict with several regiment's officers he was appointed the first director of the War School of Kaunas. On 1 January 1920, Galvydis-Bykauskas became commander of the 3rd Division which was deployed near Daugavpils. In addition, on 9 April 1920, he became the acting supreme commander of the Lithuanian Army replacing Silvestras Žukauskas. In this role, Galvydis-Bykauskas was replaced by Konstantinas Žukas on 7 July 1920. On 23 October 1920, few days after the Żeligowski's Mutiny, Galvydis-Bykauskas was appointed acting commander of the 2nd Division but the division did not participate in combat. He was dismissed from the 2nd Division on 1 February 1921.

Galvydis-Bykauskas as a representative of the Lithuanian Christian Democratic Party was elected to the Constituent Assembly of Lithuania which convened in May 1920. He spoke most frequently spoke about issues concerning military and the Lithuanian Riflemen's Union. He resigned from the assembly on 17 December 1921 and returned to the War School of Kaunas. The school was transformed from a school that catered to the urgent needs at the frontline into a peacetime school for junior officers. Galvydis-Bykauskas was released to the reserve in August 1926.

After the Soviet occupation of Lithuania in June 1940, Galvydis-Bykauskas was arrested by the NKVD in June 1941. However, he was freed from Kaunas Prison after the German invasion of the Soviet Union on 22 June 1941. Galvydis-Bykauskas died on 16 July 1943.

== Biography ==
=== Russian Imperial Army ===
Galvydis-Bykauskas was born on 15 December [O.S. 3 December] 1864 in Degėsiai near Užpaliai. In 1884, he graduated from the Lisinski Forestry School of the Foresters' Corps and briefly worked as an assistant forester. In July 1885, he volunteered to the Russian Imperial Army and was sent to study at the Saint Petersburg Infantry Cadet School. He graduated with excellent grades and was awarded a prize of Dmitry Milyutin. He was assigned to the 87th Neishlott Infantry Regiment. In 1900 or 1909, he graduated from the Officers' Rifle School in Oranienbaum and was promoted to captain. In 1911, he was promoted to lieutenant colonel and was transferred to the 18th Siberian Rifle Regiment.

Galvydis-Bykauskas fought in World War I. In November 1914, he was injured near Łódź. For distinction in action, he was promoted to colonel in August 1915. In November 1915, he became commander of the 18th Siberian Rifle Regiment. In January 1916, he was captured by the Germans and kept in POW camps until early 1918.

=== Lithuanian Army ===
==== 1st Infantry Regiment ====
In early 1918, Galvydis-Bykauskas returned to Lithuania. Upon learning of the Act of Independence of Lithuania, he travelled to Vilnius to sign up for the Lithuanian Army, but it was not established until October 1918. He worked as director of procurement at the Ministry of Defence and took it upon himself to draft plans on how to organize the Lithuanian Army. He presented the plan to the ministers of defence and internal affairs who rejected it.

He officially joined the army on 23 November 1918 and was assigned as the commander of the 1st Infantry Regiment which he was to form in Alytus. He recruited men in Vilnius until the outbreak of the Lithuanian–Soviet War. On 17 December 1918, the regiment evacuated from Vilnius to Alytus. Galvydis-Bykauskas continued to recruit and train new volunteers. On 26 December, he was recalled to Vilnius and was ordered to organize defence of Vilnius against the advancing Red Army. However, that was an unrealistic order and the city was captured first by Poles then by the Soviets.

On 5 January 1920, Galvydis-Bykauskas ordered the 1st Battalion commanded by Kazys Ladiga to march towards Lentvaris to the frontline with the Soviets. They were to meet German forces which promised to supply weapons and other necessities. However, Ladiga and other officers refused as they felt undersupplied. The following day, several officers signed a letter to the Defence Staff asking to replace Galvydis-Bykauskas with someone who showed more enthusiasm and initiative. Upon learning of this letter, Galvydis-Bykauskas attempted to replace Ladiga with Julius Čaplikas and challenged them to duel when they refused to follow orders.

==== War School ====
After this conflict, Galvydis-Bykauskas was assigned as the director of the War School of Kaunas on 25 January 1919. He assumed this role after he returned from Berlin on 27 February 1919. The first classes were held on 11 March 1919. Galvydis-Bykauskas taught field statute, theory of shooting, and practical riffle combat. It was a difficult task as there was a lack of instruction material. In August 1919, Galvydis-Bykauskas became commander of the Kaunas garrison. His main task was ensuring soldiers' discipline and obtaining supplies for the army.

In August 1919, Galvydis-Bykauskas was one of about 18 Lithuanian officers who took initiative and began arresting Poles in Kaunas in an attempt to stop the planned coup by the Polish Military Organization. In October 1919, he was promoted to lieutenant general.

==== Army command ====
On 1 January 1920, Galvydis-Bykauskas was transferred from the War School to the 3rd Division (3rd, 6th, and 9th Infantry Regiments) which was deployed near Daugavpils where Lithuanian, Polish, and Latvian forces met when pushing out the Red Army (see: Lithuanian–Soviet War#Final battles). On 7 February, Galvydis-Bykauskas assumed the command. There were no active engagements at this front, but there were tensions between the Lithuanian and Polish troops that led to various incidents. The most serious incident occurred on 14 March 1920 when Poles pushed out Lithuanians from the Turmantas railway station.

In addition, on 9 April 1920, Galvydis-Bykauskas became the acting supreme commander of the Lithuanian Army when supreme commander Silvestras Žukauskas took vacation to retrieve his family from Kyiv but decided to resign from the military in June 1920. On 7 July 1920, as tensions were rising in the Polish–Lithuanian War, Galvydis-Bykauskas was dismissed from the army command and was replaced by Konstantinas Žukas who was minister of defence at the same time.

On 23 October 1920, few days after the loss of Vilnius to Poland in the Żeligowski's Mutiny, Galvydis-Bykauskas was appointed acting commander of the 2nd Division. He departed to the frontline, but the division did not participate in combat. After a ceasefire was reached on 30 November 1920, Galvydis-Bykauskas moved the division's staff to Kaunas. He was dismissed from the 2nd Division on 1 February 1921 and replaced by Mykolas Velykis.

==== Constituent Assembly ====
In March 1920, Galvydis-Bykauskas as a representative of the Lithuanian Christian Democratic Party was elected to the Constituent Assembly of Lithuania which convened in May 1920. He was elected chairman of the parliamentary committee on national defence. At the assembly, Galvydis-Bykauskas most frequently spoke about issues concerning military and the Lithuanian Riflemen's Union. He supported proposals that the Ministry of Defence would have full jurisdiction over their riflemen and even more so when concerning their weaponry.

He spoke on other issues, including the proposed constitution (supported death penalty and emphasized the need for state orders) and land reform (supported in principle but spoke against specific provisions that excluded Lithuanian Americans from the reform or that nobility's land would be nationalized without taking into account how they acquired the land). In discussions, he often brought up traditional values and moral virtues.

His work at the assembly was interrupted by the Żeligowski's Mutiny and his command of the 2nd Division. He resigned from the assembly on 17 December 1921.

==== Return to the War School ====
On 18 December 1921, Galvydis-Bykauskas was again appointed director of the War School of Kaunas. The school was transformed from a school that catered to the urgent needs at the frontline into a peacetime school for junior officers that had more long-term strategic goals of strengthening the Lithuanian Army. The curriculum was expanded and the length of the program increased from six months to two years. In December 1922, the school moved from cramped premises in central Kaunas to Panemunė. In addition to the work at the war school, Galvydis-Bykauskas was also commander of the Kaunas garrison from 1 January 1922 to 1 September 1923.

=== Civilian life ===
On 28 August 1926, Galvydis-Bykauskas was released to the reserve based on his request. On the same day, he was promoted to general with seniority from 5 April 1920. He continued to participate in the Lithuanian public life. He was a board member of the Union of Lithuanian Farmers' Cooperatives (organization sponsored by the Farmers' Association) and of the Catholic Action Center. As such, he was in opposition to the authoritarian regime of President Antanas Smetona and was investigated by the Lithuanian police. He owned a manor in Romainiai.

After the Soviet occupation of Lithuania in June 1940, Galvydis-Bykauskas was investigated by the NKVD as an active member of the Lithuanian Christian Democratic Party and for several anti-communist speeches delivered in the 1930s. He was arrested on 12 June 1941 because he was implicated as a member of the "counter-revolutionary" organization Lithuanian Defense Guard (Lietuvos gynimo gvardija). However, he was freed from Kaunas Prison after the German invasion of the Soviet Union on 22 June 1941.

According to testimony of Klemensas Jūra-Jūraitis, Galvydis-Bykauskas assisted Jews from the Kovno Ghetto by providing them food and clothing.

Galvydis-Bykauskas died on 16 July 1943. He was given and official funeral. The lying in state was held at the Church of St. Michael the Archangel. He was buried in Raudondvaris.

== Publications ==
Galvydis-Bykauskas published two books: 201-page Lietuva pasaulėžiūrų kovoje (Lithuania in the Struggle of Worldviews) in 1936 and 48-page Marksizmas pavojuje (Marxism in Danger) in 1939 or 1940. Both books were confiscated by the Soviet authorities in 1940 and are bibliographic rarities. Some of his biographies provide that he published Komunizmas Ispanijoje (Communism in Spain) in 1939 but it is likely a mix-up with Marksizmas pavojuje.

He also contributed articles to the Lithuanian press. He published memoirs in XX amžius and military periodicals Mūsų žinynas, Karys, and Kariūnas. In late 1930s, he published a few articles on world political events and rising military tensions in Ūkininkas and other newspapers.

== Awards ==
Galvydis-Bykauskas received the following awards:

- Order of Saint Stanislaus (3rd class in 1902, 2nd class in 1909)
- Order of Saint Anna (3rd class in 1906, 2nd class in 1914)
- Order of Saint Vladimir (4th class in 1915)
- Order of the Cross of Vytis (2nd type, 2nd degree in 1926)
- Order of the Lithuanian Grand Duke Gediminas (2nd degree in 1928)
- Independence Medal (Lithuania) (1928)
- Medal for the 10th Anniversary of the Liberation War (Latvia, 1929)

== Bibliography ==
- Adomaitienė, Irena (14 November 2011). "Jonas Galvydis-Bykauskas". Bibliografinė duomenų bazė "Žymūs Lietuvos žmonės" (in Lithuanian). Lietuvos nacionalinė Martyno Mažvydo biblioteka.
- Adomaitienė, Irena (2014). "Jono Galvydžio-Bykausko bibliografija". In Alonderis, Arūnas (ed.). Generolas Jonas Galvydis-Bykauskas, 1864–1943 (PDF) (in Lithuanian). Vilnius: Generolo Jono Žemaičio Lietuvos karo akademija. ISBN 978-609-8074-28-4.
- Gudienė, Danguolė; Žalienė, Dalia, eds. (2003). Lietuvos kariuomenės karininkai (in Lithuanian). Vol. 3. Lietuvos nacionalinis muziejus. ISBN 9955-415-30-4.
- Lesčius, Vytautas (2004). Lietuvos kariuomenė nepriklausomybės kovose 1918–1920 (PDF). Lietuvos kariuomenės istorija (in Lithuanian). Vilnius: General Jonas Žemaitis Military Academy of Lithuania. ISBN 9955-423-23-4.
- Likhotvorik, Alexey (21 July 2012). Быковский Иван Константинович. Русская армия в Первой мировой войне (in Russian). grwar.ru.
- Lukšas, Aras (30 December 2016). "Kazimieras Ladiga: savanorių kovų legenda". Lietuvos žinios (in Lithuanian).
- Surgailis, Gintautas (1992). Lietuvos kariuomenės vadai (in Lithuanian). Vilnius: Mintis. ISBN 5-417-00513-4.
- Surgailis, Gintautas (2014). "Karininkas Jonas Galvydis-Bykauskas – pirmojo pėstininkų pulko vadas". In Alonderis, Arūnas (ed.). Generolas Jonas Galvydis-Bykauskas, 1864–1943 (PDF) (in Lithuanian). Vilnius: Generolo Jono Žemaičio Lietuvos karo akademija. ISBN 978-609-8074-28-4.
- Tamašauskas, Kazimieras (17 July 2023) [2018]. "Jonas Galvydis-Bykauskas". Visuotinė lietuvių enciklopedija (in Lithuanian). Mokslo ir enciklopedijų leidybos centras.
- Tupėnienė, Konstancija Janina (2014). "Generolo Jono Galvydžio-Bykausko biografijos faktai ir naujausi tyrimai". In Alonderis, Arūnas (ed.). Generolas Jonas Galvydis-Bykauskas, 1864–1943 (PDF) (in Lithuanian). Vilnius: Generolo Jono Žemaičio Lietuvos karo akademija. ISBN 978-609-8074-28-4.
- Veilentienė, Audronė (2006). "Galvydis-Bykauskas, Jonas". In Ragauskas, Aivas; Tamošaitis, Mindaugas (eds.). Lietuvos Steigiamojo Seimo (1920–1922 metų) narių biografinis žodynas. Didysis Lietuvos parlamentarų biografinis žodynas (in Lithuanian). Vol. 2. Vilnius: Vilniaus pedagoginis universitetas. pp. 148–149. ISBN 9789955201465.
- Žigaras, Feliksas (2007). "Lietuvos kariuomenės karininkų rengimo ir jų kvalifikacijos tobulinimo sistema (1919–1940 m.)". In Ažubalis, Algirdas (ed.). Karo pedagogika lietuvoje (1918–1940 m.) (PDF) (in Lithuanian). Vilnius: Generolo Jono Žemaičio Lietuvos karo akademija. pp. 18–160. ISBN 978-9955-423-58-4.
