= Pavel Bermondt-Avalov =

Georgian-Russian warlord (1894–1973)

Major General Prince Pavel Bermondt-Avalov
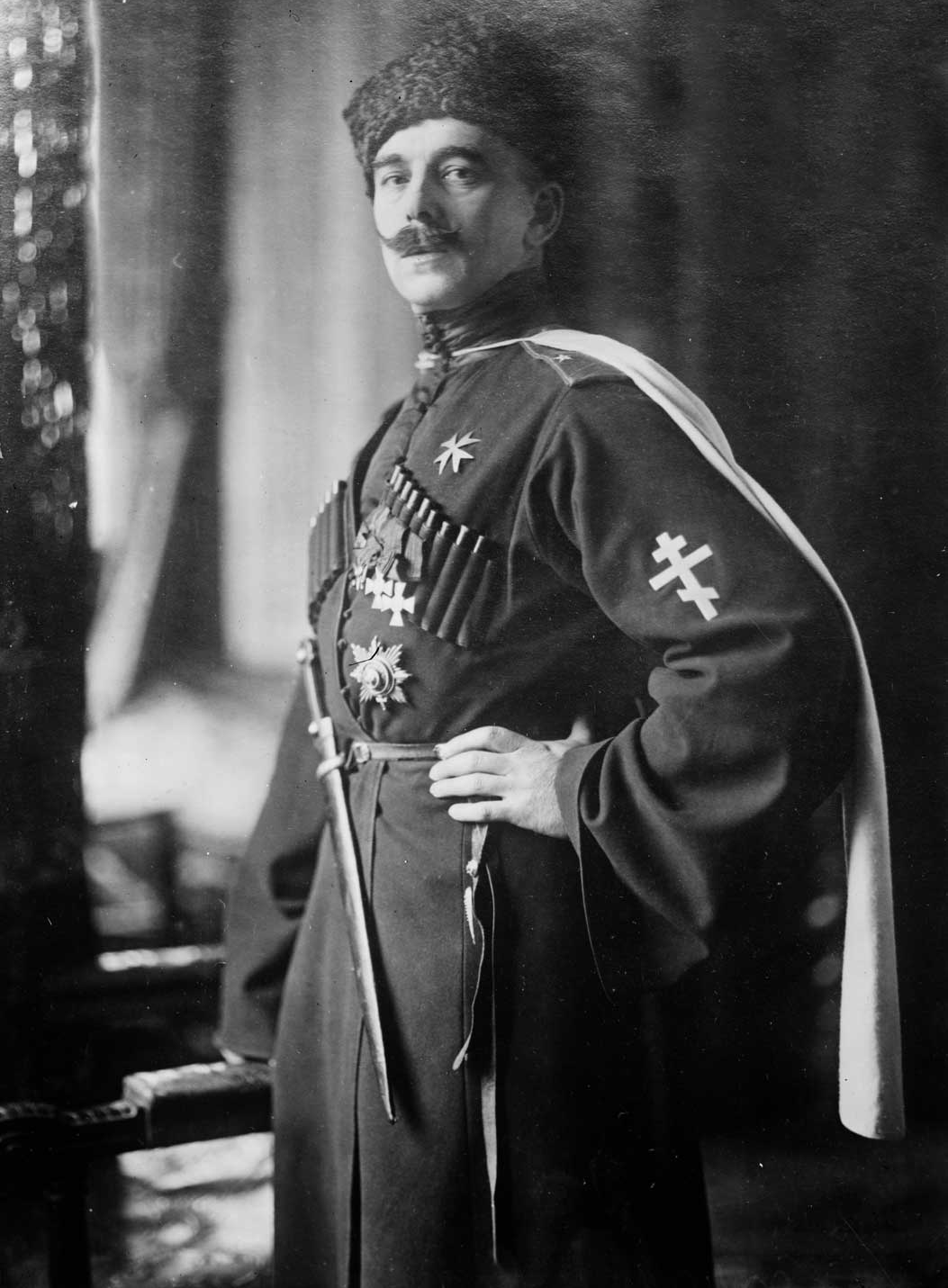
- Bermondt-Avalov in c. 1920
- Born: 16 March 1877; Tiflis, Tiflis Governorate, Russian Empire
- Died: 27 December 1973 (aged 96); New York City, U.S.
- Military career
- Allegiance: Russian Empire; Russian Republic; White movement
- Branch: Imperial Russian Army; White Army; West Russian Volunteer Army
- Service years: 1901–1919
- Rank: Major General
- Units: Argun 1st Cossack Regiment; Ussuri Cossack Regiment; St. Petersburg 1st Lancers Regiment
- Conflicts: Russo-Japanese War; First World War; Russian Civil War; Latvian War of Independence; Lithuanian Wars of Independence
- Awards: Order of St. George; Order of Saint Anna

Prince Pavel Rafailovich Bermondt-Avalov (Russian: Павел Рафаилович Бермондт-Авалов) or Prince Avalov (16 March [O.S. 4 March] 1877 – 27 December 1973) was a Russian officer and Cossack adventurer-warlord. He is best known as the commander of the West Russian Volunteer Army which was active in present-day Latvia and Lithuania in the aftermath of World War I.

Born into a Georgian-Russian family, Avalov received a musical education in Warsaw and joined the Russian Imperial Army's Baikal Cossacks Host as a musical conductor. He participated in the Russo-Japanese War, during which he was awarded the Cross of St. George. After converting to Orthodoxy, he was transferred to the Ussuri Cossacks and was promoted to cornet. During the First World War, Avalov worked as a personal adjutant for Pavel Mishchenko, serving in Eastern Prussia and Galicia. Throughout his military career, Avalov was injured seven times.

After being demobilized in 1917, Avalov became involved in the Russian Civil War as an ardent supporter of the White Army. After defending Kiev from Symon Petliura, Avalov was captured and later exiled into Germany, where he formed a unit to fight the Bolsheviks in the Baltic States, along with general Rüdiger von der Goltz's Baltische Landeswehr. While fighting in Latvia and Lithuania to establish a pro-German and anti-Bolshevik territorial union, Avalov's West Russian Volunteer Army, also called the Bermontians, raided and pillaged the countryside and its occupied areas. After suffering defeats in Riga and Radviliškis, Avalov's army was severely damaged and subsequently retreated into Germany. In Germany, Avalov participated in right-wing White émigré movements, strongly supporting Adolf Hitler's Nazi Party. Despite this, he was imprisoned and sent to a concentration camp for embezzling funds meant for his Russian National Socialist Movement. Avalov escaped to Italy through Switzerland, later relocating to Belgrade before finally emigrating to the United States and living there until his death.

== Early life ==
=== Origins ===
Pavel Bermondt-Avalov was born in Tbilisi in modern Georgia. There are varying accounts of his familial origins and date of birth. Some sources, like the United States Social Security Death Index, give his birthday at 16 (O.S. 4) March 1877, while others, such as Avalov's own memoirs, place the year at 1884. A version of his origin claims that his father was Georgian prince Mikhail Antonovich Avalishvili, while his mother was Princess Sofia Kugusheva of Tatar origin, whose second husband would be staff sergeant Rafail Bermondt. Another version claims that Avalov was born in 1877 in Vladivostok to jeweler Rafail Bermant, by origin a Jew who converted to Orthodoxy. Other versions claim that Avalov's father was a Karaite captain in the Russo-Turkish War of 1877–1878. Nevertheless, Avalov adopted both his father's and stepfather's surnames and since 1919 called himself Prince Pavel Mikhailovich Bermondt-Avalov.

=== Military service ===
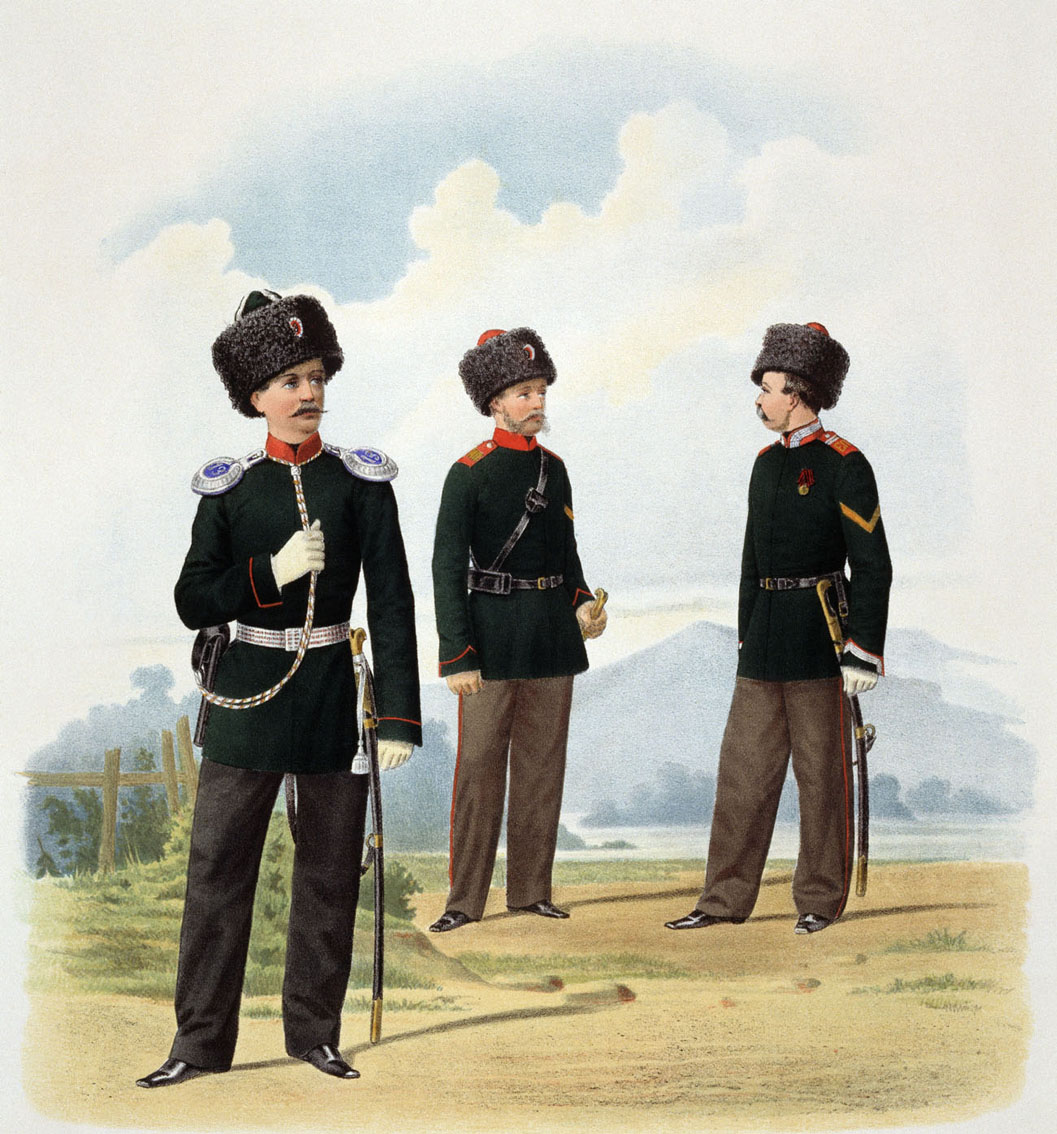
Transbaikal Cossacks of the Russian Imperial Army

After receiving a musical education with Professor Ziminski of the Warsaw Institute of Music, Avalov enlisted as a bandmaster in the 1st Argun Regiment of the Transbaikal Cossacks. In 1904 he joined the regiment as a volunteer soldier, and in 1905 was promoted to ensign. Avalov participated in the Russo-Japanese War, during which he was awarded the Order of St. George, 3rd and 4th degrees. He was wounded three times during his service in the war.

In 1905, Avalov converted to Orthodoxy. In 1906, Avalov was transferred to a Ussuri Cossack division and since then identified himself as an Ussuri Cossack. In 1908, Avalov was promoted to cornet and commanded the 1st Don Cossack Regiment. When filling out his service progress list, for an unclear reason, Avalov noted that he was a Lutheran. At this time Avalov was married to a Polish noblewoman called Sophia Simonolevich. In 1909 Avalov, supposedly retired from the army after failing to pass officer's exams.

=== First World War ===
During the First World War, Avalov was enrolled in the 2nd Caucasus Corps of the 10th Army, performing as the personal adjutant of the corps commander Pavel Mishchenko. After the defeat of his corps in East Prussia, Avalov continued his service in the 31st Corps of the 4th Army in Galicia. Avalov was wounded four times during the course of his service, and was awarded the Order of St. Anna, 4th degree. Avalov was promoted to either captain or lieutenant during the war. In 1917, Avalov was demobilized.

== Civil War ==
=== Russian Civil War ===
After the February Revolution of 1917, Avalov was elected the commander of an Uhlan regiment stationed in St. Petersburg. During this time he was part of a secret officer organization that was preparing a coup against the Russian Provisional Government, despite them awarding Avalov the rank of colonel in 1918. After the October Revolution, he lived in Zhitomir. The same year Avalov became head of the recruitment and counter-intelligence center of the White Army's southern army in Kiev. In winter of 1918, Avalov defended the city from Symon Petliura's nationalist forces, who, after seizing power in the region, imprisoned Avalov and other Russian officers. The officers as well as Avalov himself were evacuated to Germany when the German army abandoned Ukraine. In Germany he was active in Russian monarchist groups.

=== Formation of the Bermontians ===
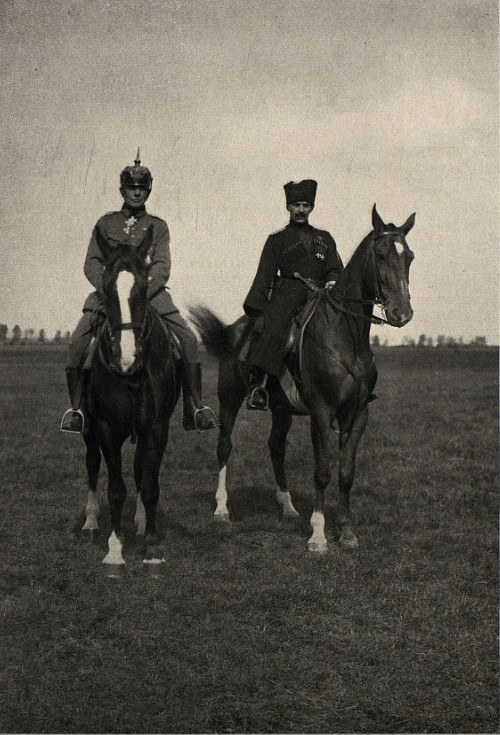
Pavel Bermondt-Avalov and Rudiger von der Goltz in a parade, c. 1919

After the end of the First World War, the Entente powers ordered German soldiers to remain in Lithuania and Latvia and fight the incoming Bolshevik army. While in exile in Germany, Avalov organized a small group of soldiers (around 300 men) from the Salzwedel prisoner of war camp. The unit was named the Graf Keller Corps after the murdered leader of the white movement, Fyodor Arturovich Keller. In June 1919, the unit was relocated to Courland.

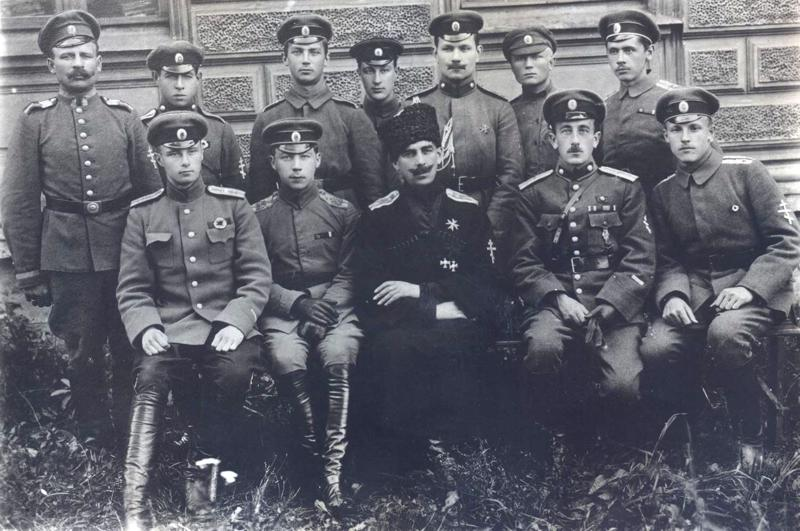
Pavel Bermondt-Avalov with a group of officers, c. 1919

Avalov arrived in Mitau (now Jelgava), where he began forming his own army that would become the base of the Western Russian Volunteer Army, also called the Bermontians. While in Jelgava, Avalov held lavish parties and agreed to take over the German Freikorps. The German troops of the former Freikrops wished to remain in Latvia and wait for the yet unfulfilled promise, and as such chose to join Avalov's army. The two detachments of the army, led by Avalov and Colonel Vyrgolich, merged into the Western Corps of the Northwestern Army under the leadership of Prince Lieven and his detachment. Less than a month after its merging, general Yudenich gave the army the order to join his army on the Narva front. While Prince Lieven's detachment sailed to Narva, Avalov and Vyrgolich refused to carry out Yudenich's order under the formal pretext that their detachments were not completed, while in reality Avalov, who viewed his army as equal to the Northwestern one, wished to remain in Latvia and further the creation of a pro-German, anti-Bolshevik territorial union.

After the disbandment of general Rüdiger von der Goltz's German Baltic volunteer corps, the German troops were ordered to retreat from the Baltics and return home, however Goltz and the soldiers refused in hopes of gaining land and citizenship in Latvia as was promised to them by the Latvian government. Avalov was later appointed the "commander of all Russian units formed in Courland and Lithuania" by Yudenich. Avalov's army numbered some 50,000 men at this point - 40,000 of them being German or Balto-German and 10,000 being Russian. Since the German government stopped paying for the troops, finances were mostly coming from German economic leaders that had interests in the Baltics, as well as J. P. Morgan Jr. and the Order of St John. Avalov's army also printed its own money. The army was marked by internal disagreements between Avalov and Vyrgolich.

=== War in Latvia ===
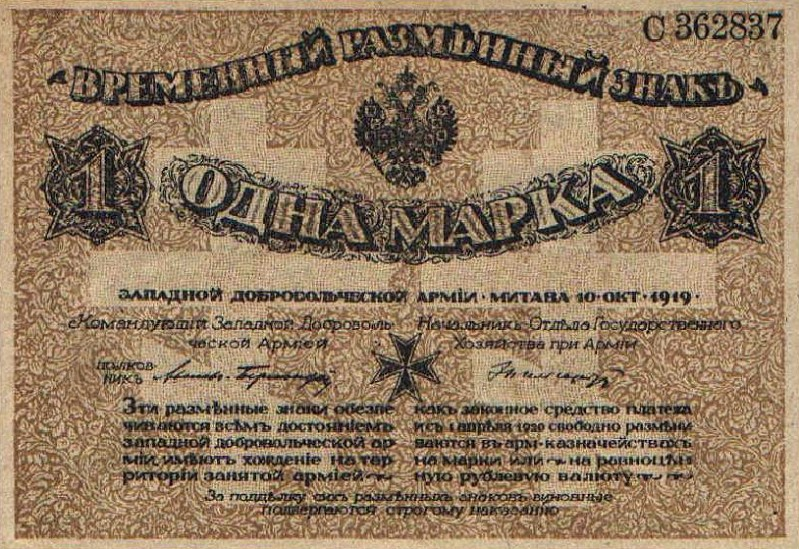
1 Mark of the Western Russian Volunteer Army

The Bermontians occupied a large part of Courland Governorate and Riga in Latvia after hostilities began in August. In Riga, Avalov supposedly was carried in a cart and exclaimed to the locals that he had come to heroically save St. Petersburg, meanwhile his troops pillaged the occupied areas. Several bombs, as well as leaflets in Russian, were dropped on the city from airplanes, in which Latvians were asked to “submit to the authority of Colonel Bermondt in order to be annexed to the great and mighty Russia.” As Bermondt wished to conclude a truce with the Latvians, military help from Estonia and Britain in the form of armored trains and battleships arrived, which helped the Latvians to repel the Bermontian army led by von der Goltz after the decisive Battle of Riga. While being in Mitau, Bermondt proposed to the Polish government the division of Lithuania. However, he later abandoned that plan, as he became worried that the Poles might get angered if he took Kaunas.

=== War in Lithuania ===
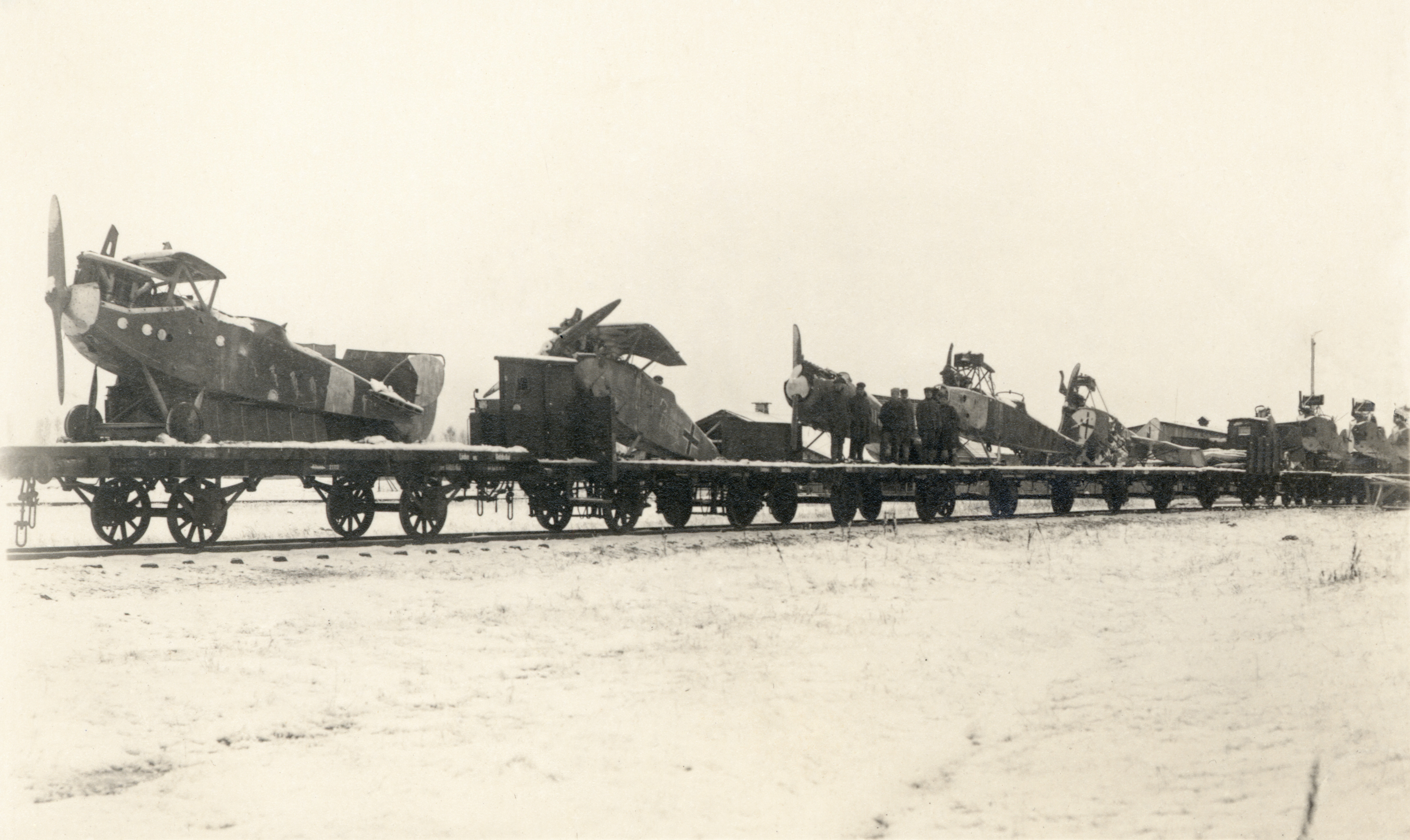
Bermontian planes captured by the Lithuanian army after the Battle of Radviliškis

The Bermontians began their attack on Lithuania in July. The Bermontians, having occupied a large part of Samogitia, pillaged and raided the countryside. One source reports that Avalov's army, while occupying Šiauliai, beat up the headmaster and a majority of the students of the Šiauliai gymnasium. In Šiauliai itself, Avalov printed newspapers in which promises were given to soldiers that they would receive Russian citizenship and land. His army continued raiding Lithuania by occupying the important railway city of Radviliškis and demanding free usage of Lithuanian and Latvian railways. The Bermontian rule over Radviliškis came to an end after the Lithuanian victory against the Bolshevik invasion, after which more troops could be relocated to fight the Bermontians. Avalov's army suffered severe equipment and manpower losses in the Battle of Radviliškis in November. French delegate Henri Niessel ordered the army to retreat into Germany, and by mid-December, the Bermontians began their retreat, and Avalov in the meanwhile declared himself Major General, escaping through Klaipėda into Germany, while his army retreated directly into Tilsit.

== Later years ==
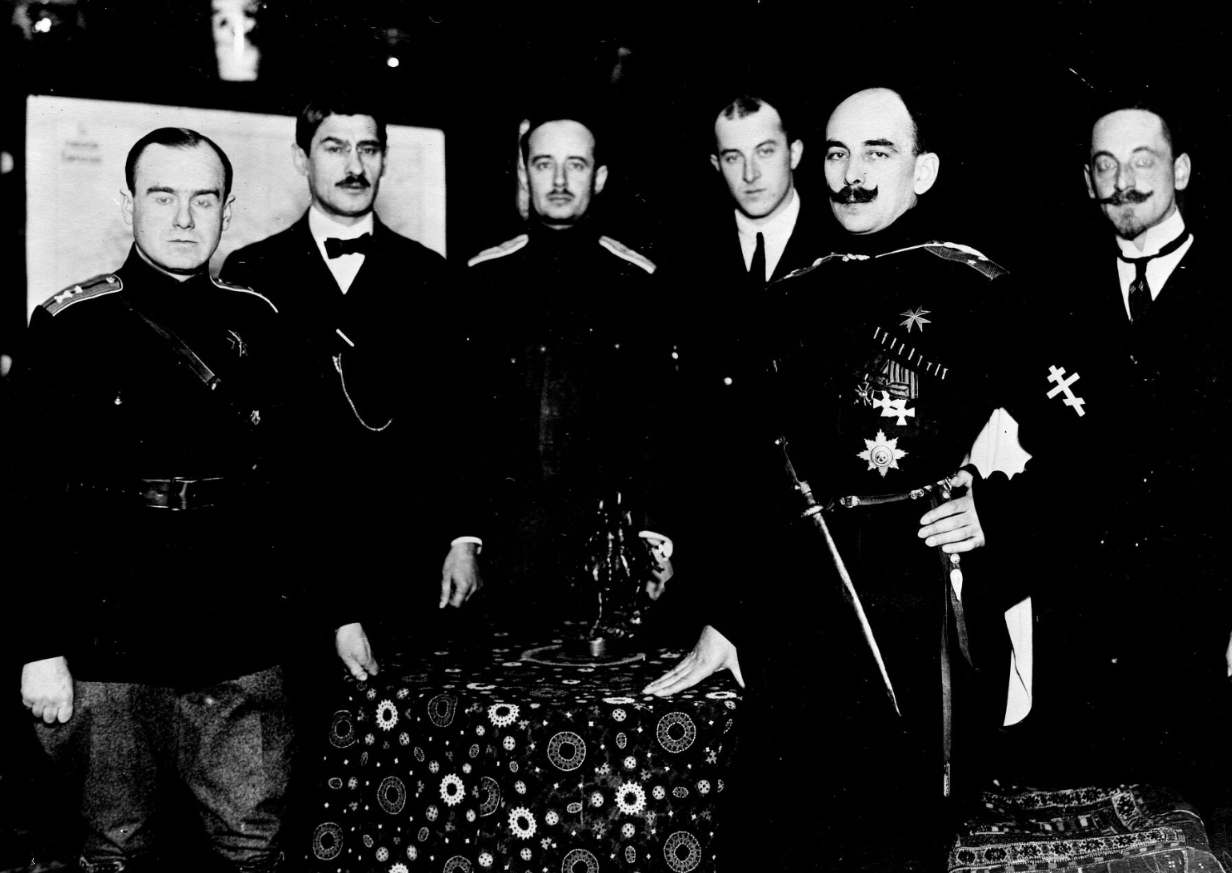
Pavel Bermondt-Avalov and his officers in Berlin, c. 1920

=== Interwar ===
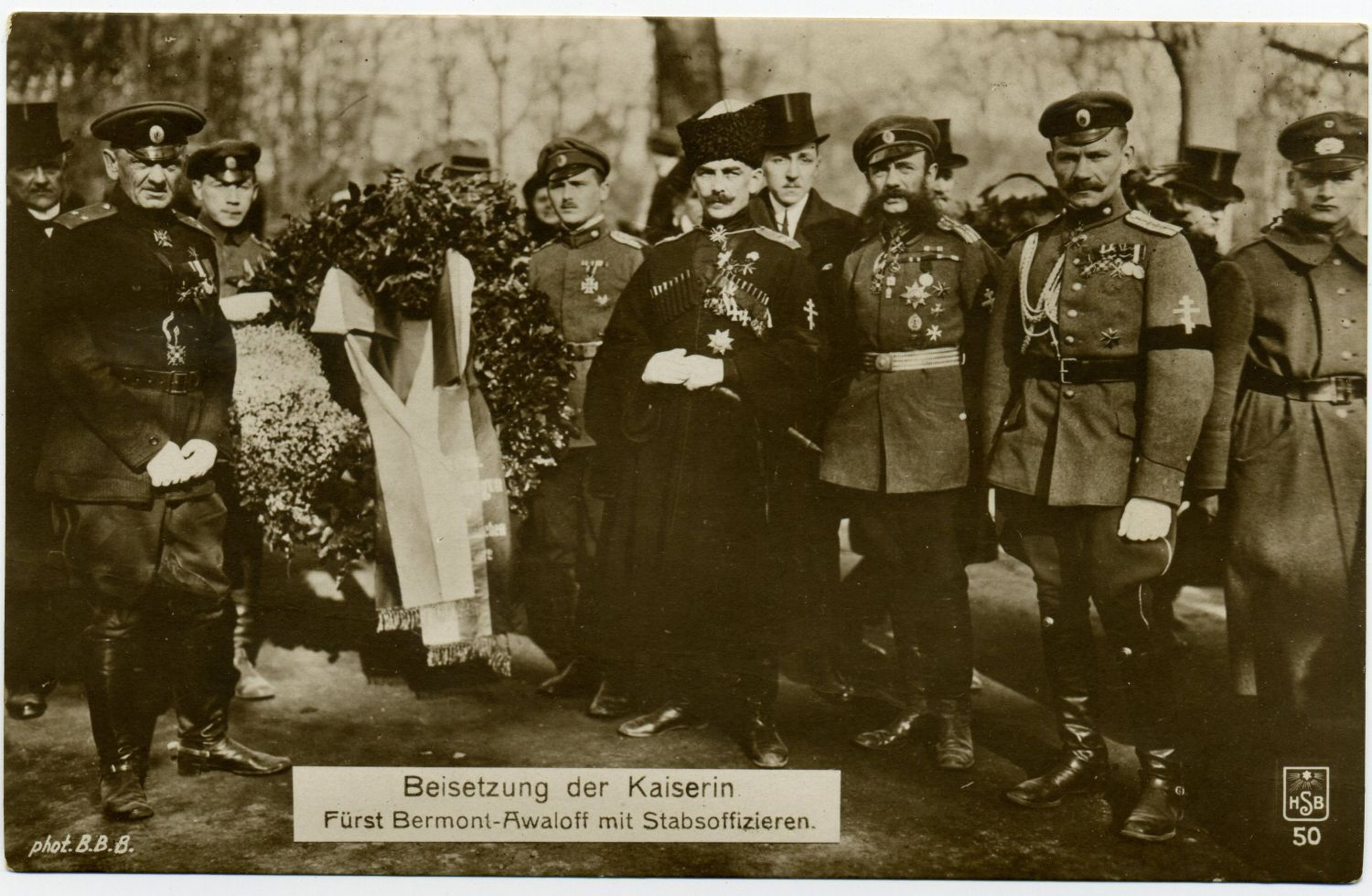
Pavel Bermondt-Avalov at funeral ceremony of Empress Augusta Victoria of Schleswig-Holstein, 1921.

From 1920 to 1922 Avalov worked at the Berlin film studio UFA GmbH as an assistant director. Avalov's former army formed the Baltikumkampfer, which was composed of veterans of the Baltic theater. They published their own newspaper Volk und Wehr, in which they supposedly prophesized a return to the East to build "new German colonies". He also worked in a trading company in Hamburg, unsuccessfully trying to build a political career in the early years of Russian emigres. Avalov supported the Kapp Putsch by offering to create military units from his former Bermontian army. Avalov collaborated with the Aufbau-Vereinigung, a right-wing German and Russian emigre organization, whose main goal was to overthrow the Weimar Republic's government, and later - the government of the USSR. Avalov regularly came under the attention of German police for publicly expressing plans such as the formation of an army under the leadership of Grand Duke Kiril, a campaign to Moscow, etc.

In 1925 Avalov published his memoirs in German and Russian, entitled In the Fight Against Bolshevism. Its real author is supposedly rotmaster Vladimir von Rosenberg. In 1927, Avalov was involved in the counterfeiting of Soviet banknotes. In 1933 Avalov congratulated the coming of power of the NSDAP in Germany. He joined the National Russian Liberation Movement, eventually becoming its leader and transforming it into the Russian National Socialist Movement. The organization had its own assault troops, who along with the SA, fought communist detachments on the streets of German cities. However the organization was closed down due to inner conflict. Reportedly, Avalov turned out to be a cocaine and morphine addict who embezzled 8,000 German marks and spoke arrogantly about the Fuhrer Adolf Hitler.

Avalov was soon imprisoned in Berlin, and then transferred to a concentration camp outside the capital, on suspicion of embezzling the aforementioned 8,000 German mark subsidy given by the NSDAP to the Russian National Socialist Movement. In winter of 1935 he escaped from the concentration camp and fled to Switzerland, and then to Italy, settling in the city of Merano. Avalov married the princess of Mecklenburg-Schwerin, who was the cousin of Grand Duke Kiril Vladimirovich, who owned an estate in Yugoslavia. At the end of 1936 he settled in Belgrade.

=== Last years and death ===
Avalov eventually emigrated to the United States and settled in New York. Avalov continued participating in Russian emigre organizations until his death on 27 December 1973, although his death date is sometimes given as 12 January 1974.

== Personality and appearance ==
Supposedly Avalov would usually talk to his soldiers and officers, trying to sway them. Most contemporaries' accounts of Avalov are negative; “an arrogant, empty, crafty and weak person... an arrogant, petty man; to a certain extent, smart and cunning, like a snake, with a certain insolence and bravura behavior, but cowardly at heart." Stephen Tallents, a British delegate, also characterizes Avalov as "...Caucasian by birth, but of mixed blood, perhaps half Jewish. He is adventurous, obviously suffers from megalomania, is very theatrical, and seems to see himself in the future as a possible Tsar of Russia. [...] Lately he has been very openly befriending Germans in Jelgava, organizing extravagant parties and often drinking heavily. It is said that he knows very little German, but he does have a few phrases, the main of which is Deutschland über alles, which he uses in front of Germans, especially when drinking."

Latvian writer Andrievs Niedra describes Avalov as of "average height, thin, but proportionately built, with dark hair and eyes, a pale face of a southerner, a small mustache sticking up. He held himself straight, solidly, sometimes his body seemed to freeze in iconic immobility, especially when he felt that many eyes were turned on him. Outside the house, he wore a long Caucasian suit with gazyrs on his chest and a hat on his head. Bermondt spoke in a baritone voice... in a cheerful mood, he also willingly danced Caucasian mountain dances.” Avalov has also been reported to have shot one of his officers in the leg after drinking too much alcohol.

== Legacy ==
In Lithuania and Latvia, the word Bermontiada gained prominence as a term to describe their independence wars, as well as becoming a synonym for "adventure". Lucjan Żeligowski and his actions during the Żeligowski Mutiny were often compared to Avalov's warlord behavior. Avalov is featured in the Latvian film Defenders of Riga, played by Girts Krumins.

== Honours and awards ==
- Order of St. George, 3rd and 4th degrees
- Order of St. Anna, 4th degree.

== Bibliographical sources ==
- Bermondt-Avalov, Pavel (1925). Im Kampf gegen den Bolschewismus. Erinnerungen von General Fürst Awaloff, Oberbefehlshaber der Deutsch-Russischen Westarmee im Baltikum (in German). Glückstadt, Hamburg: Verlag J.J. Augustin. OCLC 15188750.
- Birontas, Adolfas (1934). Bermontininkams Lietuvą užpuolus. Šviesa.
- Čepėnas, Pranas (1986). Naujųjų laikų Lietuvos istorija. Dr Kazio Griniaus Fondas.
- Laurinaitis, Jonas Martynas (1990). Pirmasis nepriklausomos Lietuvos dešimtmetis 1918-1928. Šviesa.
- Paluszyński, Tomasz (1999). Walka o niepodległość Łotwy 1914-1921. Warsaw: Dom Wydawniczy Bellona.
- Paluszyński, Tomasz (2007). Walka o niepodległość Estonii 1914-1920. Poznań: Oficyna Wydawnicza Wyższej Szkoły Języków Obcych.
- Клавинг, Валерий (2003). Гражданская война в России: Белые армии. Военно-историческая библиотека (in Russian). Moscow.
- Šapoka, Adolfas (1989). Lietuvos istorija. Švietimo ministerijos knygų leidimo komisija.
