= 1st Infantry Regiment (Lithuania) =

Former Lithuanian Army unit (1918–40)

1st Infantry Regiment of the Lithuanian Grand Duke Gediminas
- 1-asis pėstininkų Lietuvos Didžiojo Kunigaikščio Gedimino pulkas
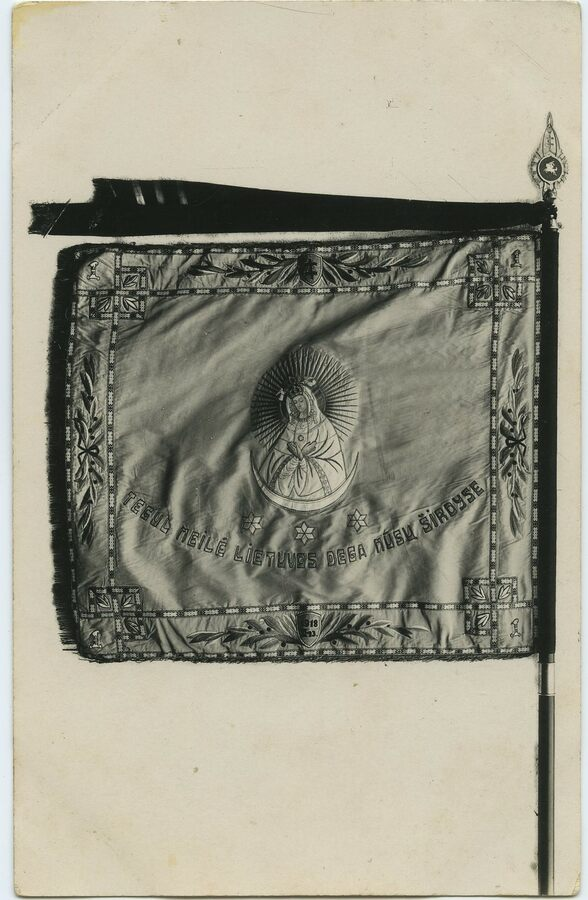
- The regiment's flag with Our Lady of the Gate of Dawn on it. The regiment received the flag on 28 May 1926.
- Active: November 1, 1918 – October 26, 1940
- Country: Lithuania
- Branch: Lithuanian Army (1918-1940); Lithuanian People's Army (1940)
- Type: Infantry
- Patron: Lithuanian Grand Duke Gediminas
- Anniversaries: August 25
- Engagements: Lithuanian–Soviet War; Lithuanian–Bermontian War; Soviet Invasion of the Baltic states

The 1st Infantry Regiment (Lithuanian: 1-asis pėstininkų pulkas), later the 1st Infantry Regiment of the Lithuanian Grand Duke Gediminas (Lithuanian: 1-asis pėstininkų Lietuvos Didžiojo Kunigaikščio Gedimino pulkas) was an infantry regiment that served in the Lithuanian Army during the interwar period.

== Formation ==
Vincas Grigaliūnas-Glovackis was made the regiment's commander on 1 November 1918. The regiment began forming in Vilnius, although in a covert manner, because the occupying German authorities hampered the formation of the Lithuanian Army. So, the regiment officially began forming only on 23 November 1918.

On December 7, the regiment included 31 officers and 59 soldiers. In ten days, the number gradually increased to 33 officers, 3 military officials (Lithuanian: karo valdininkai), military doctor L. Janulionis and 87 soldiers.

== Lithuanian–Soviet War ==
By 11 February 1919, the regiment had 36 officers, 13 military officials, one military doctor and 678 soldiers. At the time, the regiment was divided into two battalions, with the 1st Battalion, led by the officer Ignas Musteikis, being composed of 2 infantry and one machine gun companies, while the remaining 2nd Battalion under officer Pranas Tamašauskas had just 3 infantry companies, that were not fully formed. The 1st Infantry Regiment fought in the Battle of Alytus from 12 to 15 February, but suffered its first defeat there and had to retreat. The regiment's casualties were one officer, the regimental commander, Antanas Juozapavičius, and a few soldiers killed, while 20 soldiers were captured as prisoners of war, some of whom escaped captivity.

On April 25, the 1st Infantry Regiment included 57 officers, 21 military officials, and 1,640 soldiers. At the end of August 1919, the regiment had 52 officers, 15 military officials, including three doctors and the military chaplain Catholic priest Pranas Garmus, and 1,733 soldiers, of whom 1,316 were trained.

From 30 October 1919, the regiment's patron was the Grand Duke of Lithuania Gediminas. Due to the regiment's merits in combat against Bolsheviks and because it began in Vilnius, founded by Gediminas according to legend, the regiment was accorded Gediminas' name.

== 1920 ==
On 15 December 1920, the regiment was staffed by 46 officers, 10 military officials, one military chaplain and 2,333 soldiers. However, the regiment was lacking 26 officers and 537 soldiers until completion of the establishment.

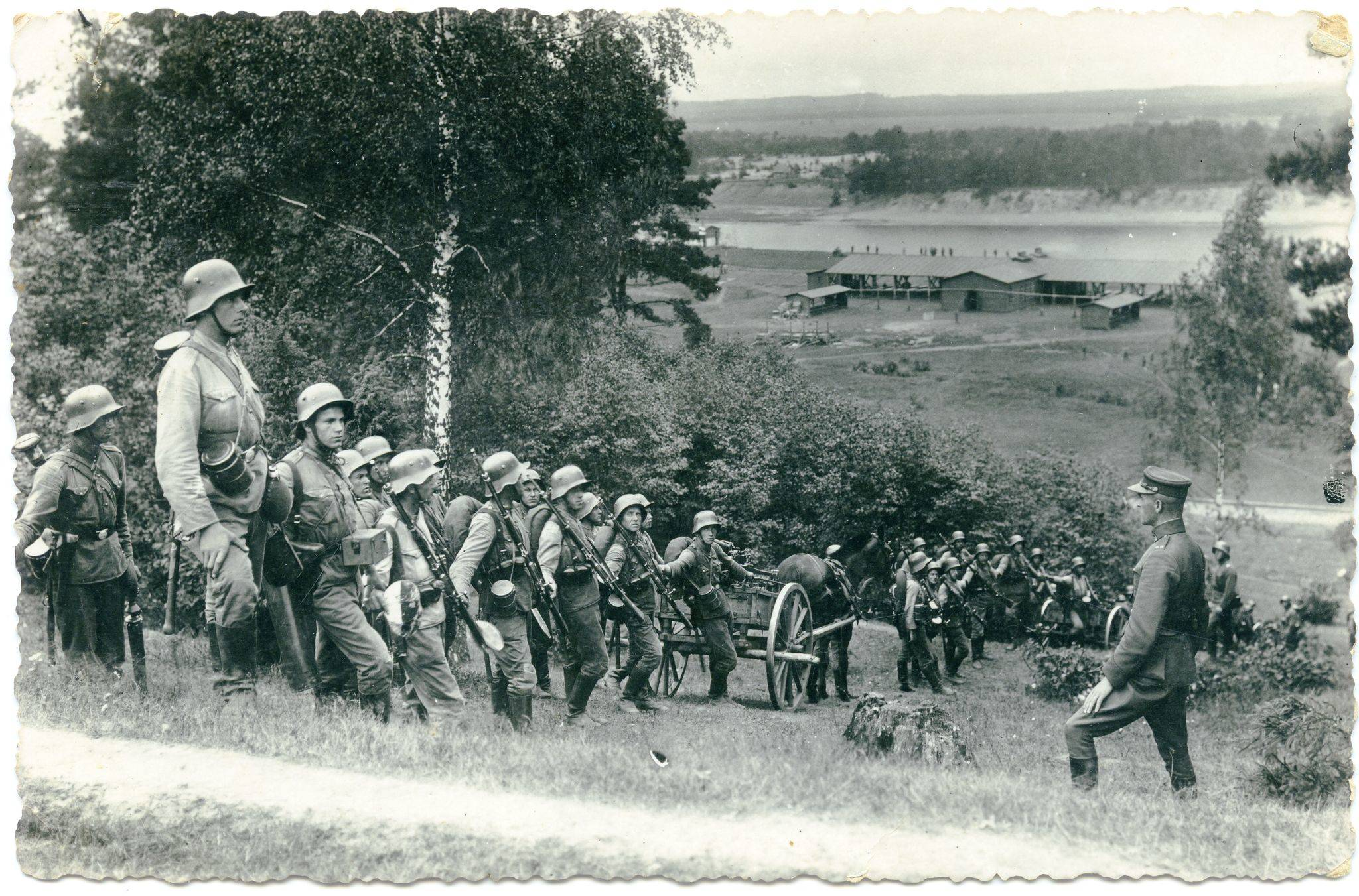
The regiment's soldiers in military training by the Šventoji river, near Ukmergė in 1932.

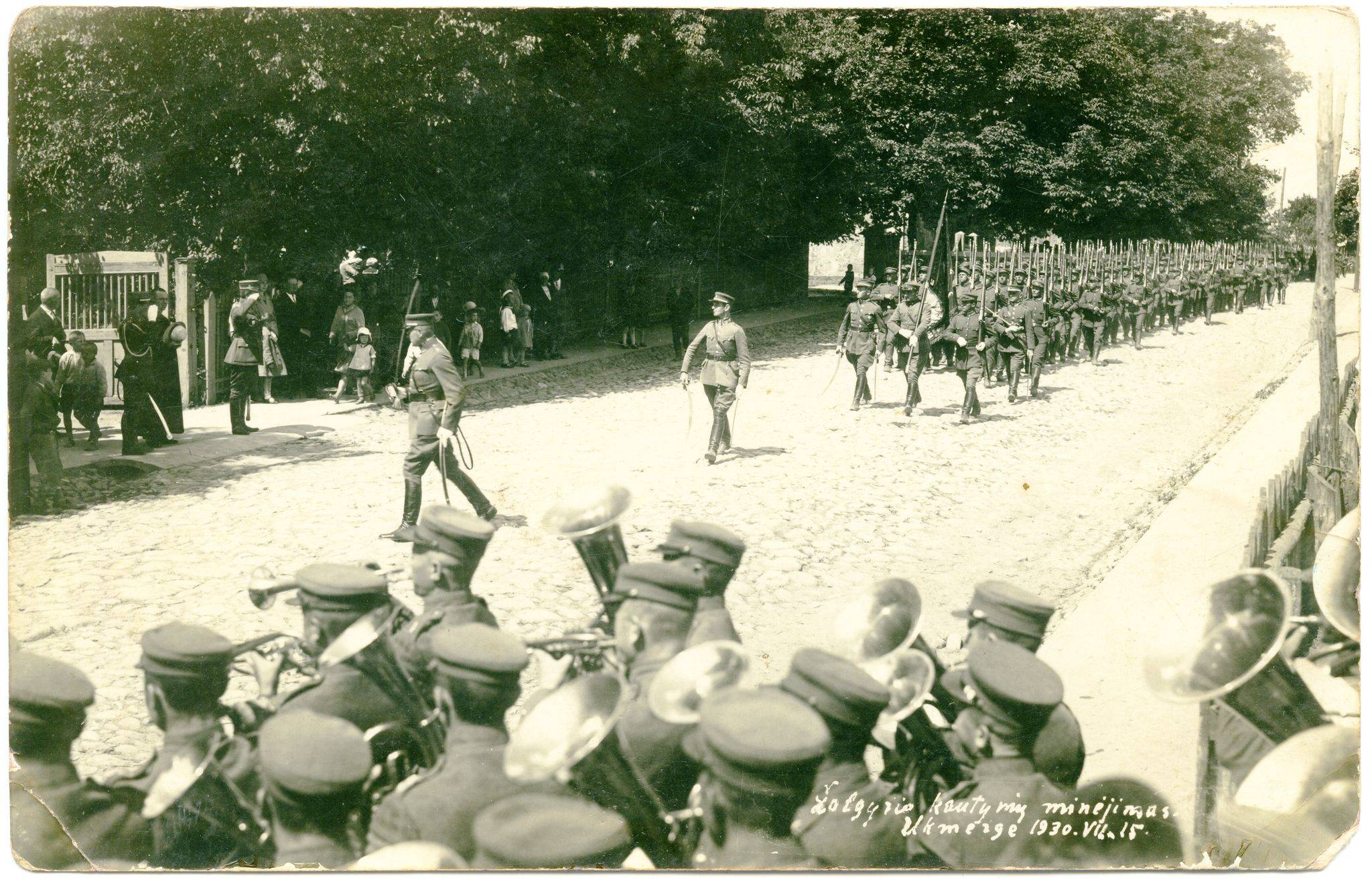
Military parade of the regiment during commemoration of the battle of Žalgiris in Ukmergė, on 15th July 1930.

== Interwar ==
From 1923 to 1939, the regiment was located in Ukmergė.

== First Soviet occupation ==
After Lithuania was occupied by the Soviet Union in 1940, on 2 July, the Lithuanian Army was renamed the Lithuanian People's Army. The name of the unit's patron was removed on 24 July 1940. Finally, the regiment was disbanded on 26 October 1940.

== Commanders ==
The regiment was commanded by:

No.	Portrait	Commander	Took office	Left office	Time in office
1	Vincas Grigaliūnas-Glovackis [lt]	Karininkas; Vincas Grigaliūnas-Glovackis (1885–1964)	1 November 1918	23 November 1918	22 days
2	Jonas Galvydis-Bykauskas	Karininkas; Jonas Galvydis-Bykauskas (1864–1943)	23 November 1918	31 December 1918	38 days
3	Valerijonas Ramanauskas	Karininkas; Valerijonas Ramanauskas (1856–1946)	25 January 1919	6 March 1919	<1 month
4	Antanas Juozapavičius	Karininkas; Antanas Juozapavičius (1894–1919); Acting	4 February 1919	13 February 1919	9 days
5	Kazys Ladiga	Karininkas; Kazys Ladiga (1893–1941)	6 March 1919	1 October 1919	<6 months
6	Vladas Skorupskis [lt]	Majoras; Vladas Skorupskis (1895–1981)	17 October 1919	28 May 1921	<1 year, 7 months
7	Ignas Musteikis [lt]	Pulkininkas leitenantas Ignas Musteikis (1890–1960)	29 May 1921	11 June 1921	<0 months
8	Vladas Skorupskis [lt]	Pulkininkas leitenantas Vladas Skorupskis (1895–1981)	11 June 1921	1 October 1924	<2 years, 3 months
9	Juozas Skorulis	Pulkininkas leitenantas Juozas Skorulis (1893–1972); Acting	7 October 1924	23 February 1925	<4 months
10	Antanas Paškovičius	Pulkininkas leitenantas Antanas Paškovičius (1886–1942); Acting	23 February 1925	22 December 1925	<9 months
11	Povilas Dundulis [lt]	Pulkininkas leitenantas Povilas Dundulis (1894–1942); Acting	2 January 1926	31 August 1926	<7 months
12	Vincas Šaudzis	Pulkininkas; Vincas Šaudzis (1894–1970)	31 August 1926	3 February 1927	<5 months
13	Povilas Dundulis [lt]	Pulkininkas leitenantas Povilas Dundulis (1894–1942); Acting	17 December 1926	6 August 1927	<7 months
14	Povilas Dundulis [lt]	Pulkininkas leitenantas, later Pulkininkas; Povilas Dundulis (1894–1942)	6 August 1927	14 February 1930	<3 years, 6 months
15	Mikas Rėklaitis	Pulkininkas leitenantas, later Pulkininkas; Mikas Rėklaitis (1895–1976); Acting	25 February 1930	24 October 1931	<1 year, 7 months
16	Mikas Rėklaitis	Pulkininkas; Mikas Rėklaitis (1895–1976)	24 October 1931	17 September 1935	<3 years, 10 months
17	Leonas Gustaitis [lt]	Generalinio štabo pulkininkas leitenantas, later Gen. štabo pulkininkas Leonas Gustaitis	17 September 1935	10 January 1940	<4 years, 3 months
18	Vladas Karvelis [lt]	Gen. štabo pulkininkas Vladas Karvelis (1901–1980); Acting	25 June 1938	12 December 1938	<5 months
19	Antanas Šurkus	Gen. štabo pulkininkas Antanas Šurkus (1893–1953); Acting	10 January 1940	15 July 1940	<6 months
20	Aleksandras Andriušaitis	Gen. štabo pulkininkas Aleksandras Andriušaitis (1900–1967)	16 July 1940	26 October 1940	<3 months

== Bibliography ==
=== Books ===
- Lesčius, Vytautas (2004). Lietuvos Kariuomenė Nepriklausomybės Kovose 1918–1920 (PDF) (in Lithuanian). Vilnius: Generolo Jono Žemaičio Lietuvos karo akademija. ISBN 9955-423-23-4.
- Surgailis, Gintautas (2011). Pirmasis pėstininkų Didžiojo Lietuvos Kunigaikščio Gedimino pulkas (PDF). Lietuvos kariuomenės istorija (in Lithuanian). Vilnius: Vytautas the Great War Museum. ISBN 978-609-412-011-4.

=== Other ===
- Rudokas, Jonas (19 April 2007). "Pirmasis pėstininkų pulkas – Lietuvos kariuomenės pradžia". Veidas (in Lithuanian). 16. Archived from the original on 2 May 2008.
- Ruzgas, Vincas, ed. (1932). Visa Lietuva (in Lithuanian). Kaunas: Spaudos Fondas.
- Vyšniauskas, Andrius (15 April 2020). "Virtuali paroda "Lietuvos kariuomenės I p. DLK Gedimino pulkas Ukmergėje"". ukmergesmuziejus.lt (in Lithuanian).
- Vydrina, Elena (2008). "lcva fondo 513 pažyma". Lietuvos centrinis valstybės archyvas (in Lithuanian).
- kariuomene.lt (2021). "LDK Gedimino Štabo Bataliono istorija". Lietuvos kariuomenė (in Lithuanian). Archived from the original on 20 October 2021.
