= Henri Niessel =

French general (1866–1955)

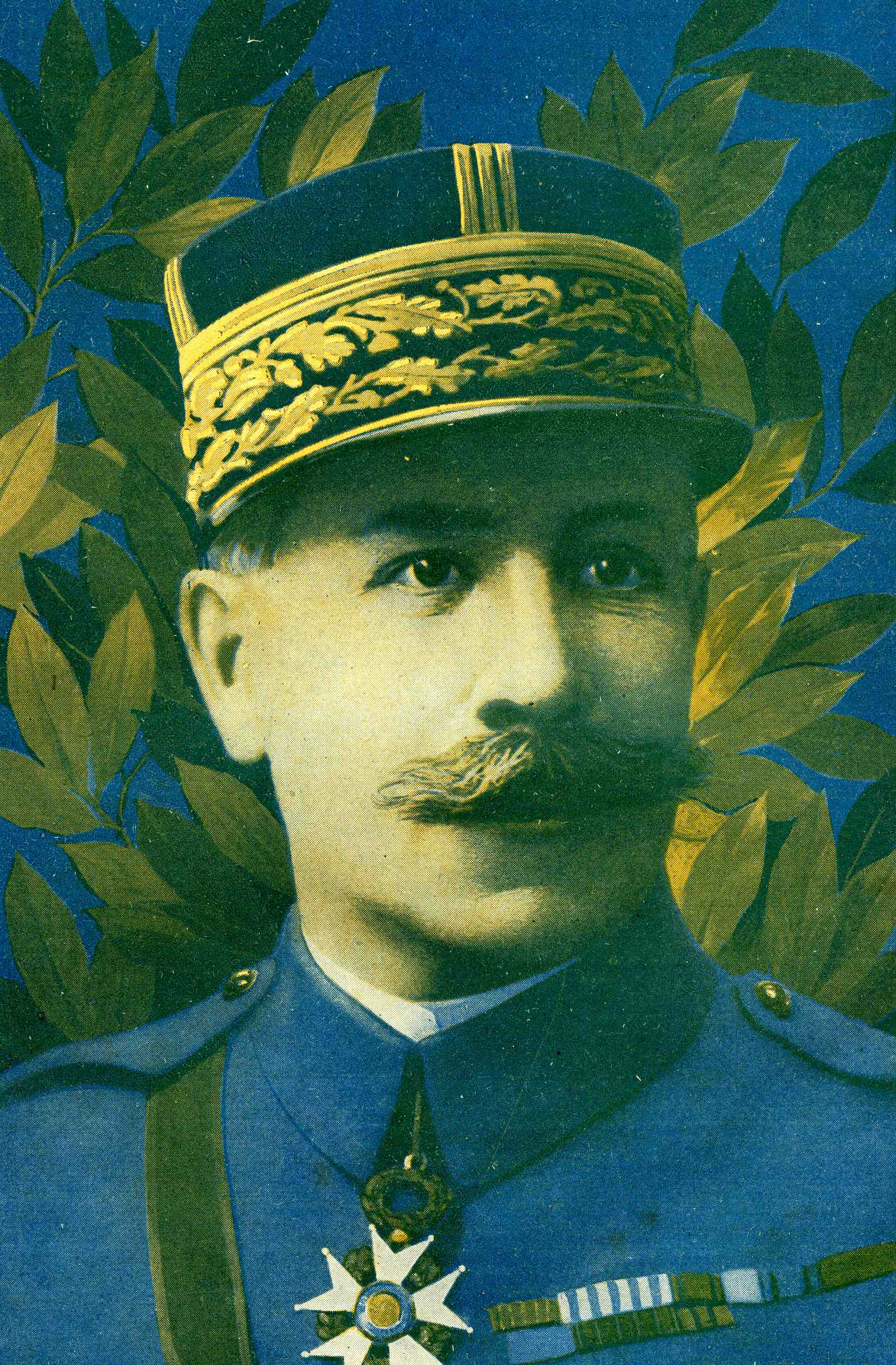
- Born: 24 October 1866; 1st arrondissement in Paris
- Died: 26 December 1955 (aged 89) 7th arrondissement in Paris
- Allegiance: France
- Rank: Lieutenant-General
- Conflicts: World War I
- Other work: Translator of von Clausewitz

Henri Albert Niessel (24 October 1866 – 26 December 1955) was a French general.

== World War I ==
Niessel was commander of the 37th Infantry Division, 11th Army Corps, 12th Army Corps and 9th Army Corps during World War One.

== In Russia ==
Niessel was a Russian speaker. In August 1917 Foch (Chief of the General Staff) sent him to lead the French Military Mission in Russia, then a Republic under the Provisional Government, in the hope that he could rebuild the Russian Army by repeating Berthelot’s success in rebuilding the Romanian Army. Niessel later oversaw the withdrawal of German Freikorps troops who had entered Latvia and Lithuania as part of Pavel Bermondt-Avalov's West Russian Volunteer Army.

== Legacy ==
Corporal Louis Barthas, serving in the 296th Infantry Regiment, wrote extensively of General Niessel in his diaries, including incidents he personally witnessed. Niessel was described as being arrogant and indifferent to the lives and well being of the soldiers who served beneath him, and willing to sustain overwhelming casualties for overly optimistic and often unachievable military gain. Barthas also noted cases where Niessel's subordinate officers mutinied and refused to follow his commands out of concern that the attacks they were ordered to make were futile.

== Publications ==
- Notes sur la Prusse dans sa grande catastrophe, 1806, translated from the German, original by Carl von Clausewitz, R. Chapelot, Paris, 1903
- D. A. T : Défense aérienne du territoire (in collaboration with Rémy Alphonse Chabord and G. de Guilhermy), Éditions cosmopolites, Paris, 1934, 250 p.
- L'évacuation des pays baltiques par les Allemands : contribution à l'étude de la mentalité allemande, Charles-Lavauzelle, Paris, Limoges, Nancy, 1935, 272 p.
- Le triomphe des Bolchéviks et la paix de Brest-Litovsk : Souvenirs 1917-1918, Plon, 1940, 381 p.
