= Suwałki Agreement =

Agreement between Poland and Lithuania in 1920

The Suwałki Agreement, Treaty of Suvalkai, or Suwalki Treaty (Polish: Umowa suwalska, Lithuanian: Suvalkų sutartis) was an agreement signed in the town of Suwałki between Poland and Lithuania on October 7, 1920. It was registered in the League of Nations Treaty Series on January 19, 1922.

Both countries had re-established their independence in the aftermath of World War I. They lacked well-defined borders, which caused the Polish–Lithuanian War over territorial disputes in the Suwałki and Vilnius Regions. In late September 1920, Polish forces defeated the Soviets at the Battle of the Niemen River, thus militarily securing the Suwałki Region and opening the possibility of an assault on the city of Vilnius (Wilno). Polish Chief of State, Józef Piłsudski, had planned to take over the city since mid-September in a false flag operation known as Żeligowski's Mutiny.

After pressure from the League of Nations, Poland agreed to negotiate, hoping to buy time and divert attention from the upcoming Żeligowski's Mutiny. The Lithuanians sought to achieve as much protection for Vilnius as possible. The agreement resulted in a ceasefire and established a demarcation line running through the disputed Suwałki Region up to the Bastuny railway station. The line was incomplete and did not provide adequate protection to Vilnius. Neither Vilnius nor the surrounding region was explicitly addressed in the agreement.

Shortly after the agreement was signed, the clauses calling for territorial negotiation and an end to military actions were unilaterally broken by Poland. Polish general Lucjan Żeligowski, acting under Piłsudski's secret orders, pretended to disobey stand-down orders from the Polish military command and marched on Vilnius. The city was occupied on October 9. The Suwałki Agreement was to take effect at noon on October 10. Żeligowski established the Republic of Central Lithuania which, despite intense protests by Lithuania, was incorporated into the Second Polish Republic in 1923. The Vilnius Region remained under Polish administration until the autumn of 1939.

== Background ==
In the aftermath of World War I both Poland and Lithuania gained independence, but borders in the region were not established. The most contentious issue was Vilnius, the historical capital of the Grand Duchy of Lithuania with a population, according to the 1916 German census, divided about evenly between Jews and Poles, but with only a 2–3% Lithuanian minority. The Soviet–Lithuanian Peace Treaty, signed in July 1920 between Lithuania and the Russian SFSR, drew the eastern border of Lithuania. Russia recognized large territories, including the Vilnius and Suwałki Regions, as belonging to Lithuania. That month, during the Polish–Soviet War, the Red Army pushed Polish forces from the contested territories, including Vilnius. In the meantime, Lithuanians secured some other areas abandoned by the Polish army, such as the town of Suwałki. On August 6, Lithuania and Soviet Russia signed a convention regarding the withdrawal of Russian troops from the recognized Lithuanian territory. However, there were indications that the Soviets planned a coup against the Lithuanian government in hopes of re-establishing the Lithuanian SSR. The Soviet troops began to retreat only after the Red Army suffered a heavy defeat in Poland at the Battle of Warsaw in mid-August.

The Polish Army pushed back and came in contact with the Lithuanians in the contested Suwałki Region. The diplomatic negotiations broke down. The Lithuanians claimed to be defending their borders, while Poland did not recognize the Soviet–Lithuanian Peace Treaty and claimed that the Lithuanians had no rights to these territories. Poland also accused the Lithuanians of collaborating with the Soviets and thus violating the declared neutrality in the Polish–Soviet War. In the ensuing hostilities, the towns of Suwałki, Sejny, and Augustów changed hands frequently. The diplomatic struggle, both directly between the two states and in the League of Nations, intensified.

== Negotiations ==
=== Pressure from the League of Nations ===
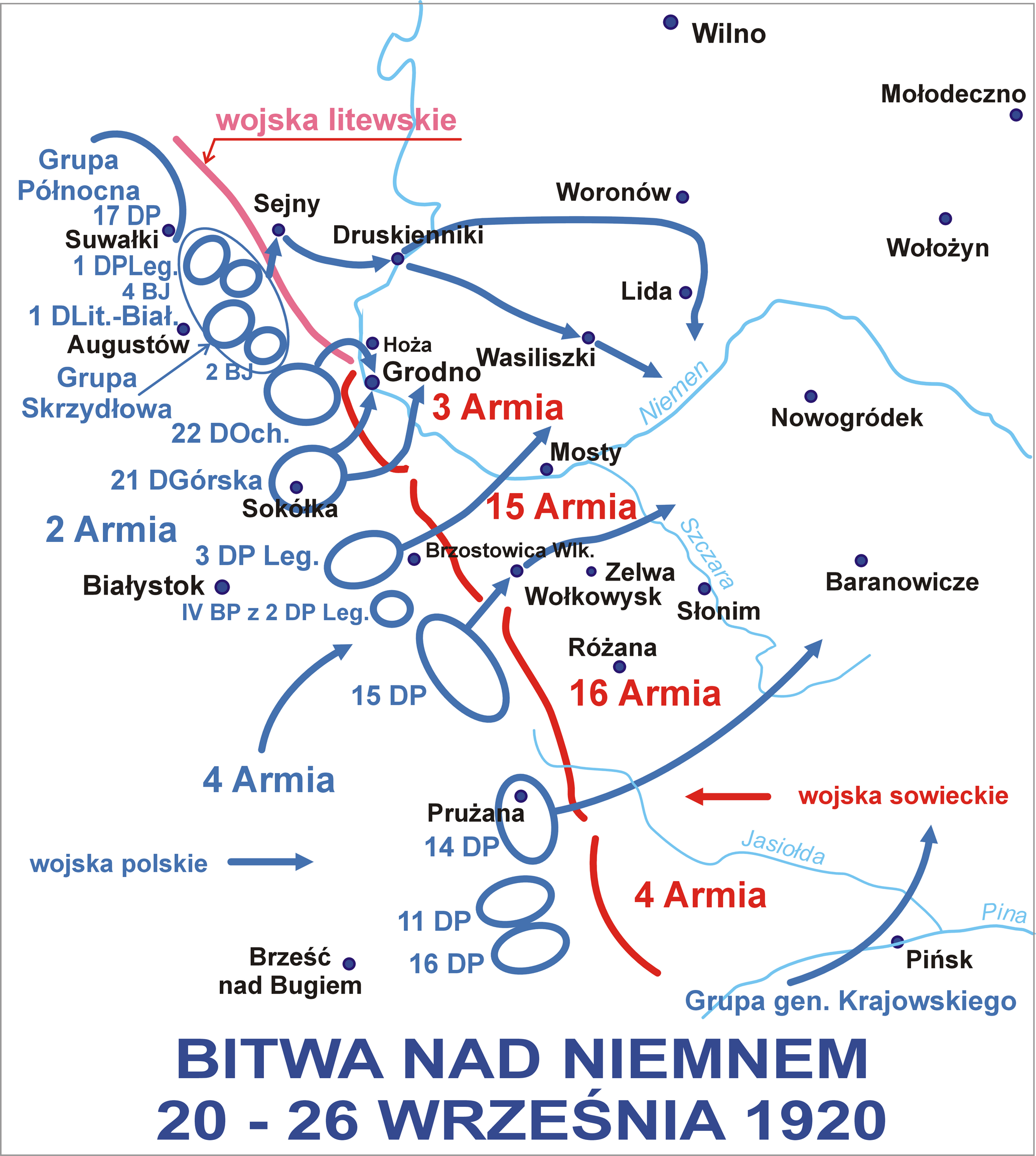
Map of the Battle of the Niemen River: Polish troops (blue) manoeuvred through the Lithuanian lines (pink) to the rear of the Russian forces (red)

On September 5, 1920, Polish Foreign Minister Eustachy Sapieha delivered a diplomatic note to the League of Nations asking it to intervene in the Polish–Lithuanian War, and especially the Battle of Sejny. He claimed that Lithuania allowed free passage through its territory for Soviet troops and therefore violated its declared neutrality in the Polish–Soviet War. The next day Lithuania responded with a direct note to Poland in which Lithuanian Foreign Minister Juozas Purickis proposed to negotiate a demarcation line and other issues in Marijampolė. On September 8, during a planning meeting for what later was the Battle of the Niemen River, the Poles decided to manoeuvre through the Lithuanian territory to the rear of the Soviet Army. In an attempt to conceal the planned attack, Polish diplomats accepted the proposal to negotiate. The negotiations started on September 16 in Kalvarija, but collapsed just two days later.

The League of Nations began its session on September 16, 1920. After reports by Lithuanian representative Augustinas Voldemaras and Polish envoy Ignacy Jan Paderewski, the League adopted a resolution on September 20. It urged both states to cease hostilities and adhere to the Curzon Line. Poland was asked to respect Lithuanian neutrality if Soviet Russia agreed to do the same. A special Control Commission was to be dispatched to the conflict zone to oversee the implementation of the resolution. The Lithuanian government accepted the resolution. Sapieha replied that Poland could not honour the Lithuanian neutrality or the demarcation line as Lithuania was actively collaborating with the Soviets. The Poles reserved the right to full freedom of action. The Lithuanian representative in London, Count Alfred Tyszkiewicz, informed the secretariat of the League of Nations that Sapieha's telegram should be regarded as a declaration of war; he also asked that the League of Nations take immediate intervention in order to stop new Polish aggressive acts.

On September 22, 1920, Poland attacked Lithuanian units in the Suwałki Region as part of the Battle of Sejny. The Polish army took prisoner 1,700 Lithuanian troops who had surrendered. Polish forces then marched, as planned during the September 8 meeting, across the Neman River near Druskininkai and Merkinė to the rear of the Soviet forces near Hrodna and Lida. The Red Army retreated. This attack, just two days after the League's resolution, damaged both Poland's and the League's reputation. Some politicians began to view Poland as an aggressor while the newly formed League realized its own shortcomings in light of such defiance. On September 26, urged by the League, Sapieha proposed new negotiations in Suwałki. Lithuania accepted the proposal on the following day.

=== Negotiations in Suwałki ===
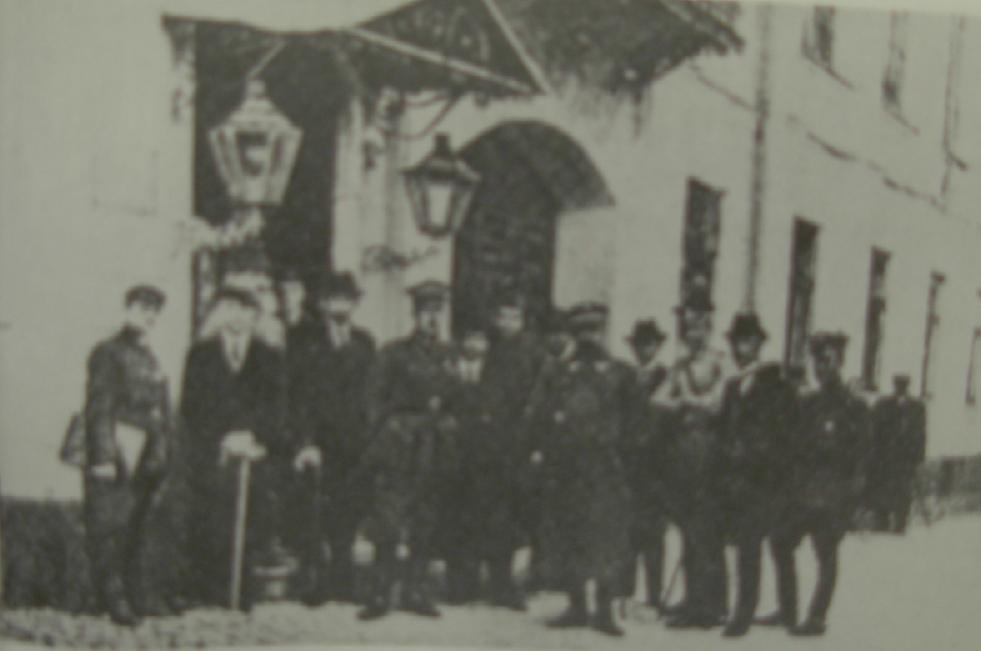
Attendees of the Suwałki Conference, 1920, in front of the building of the conference.

At the time of the negotiations, the military situation on the ground was threatening Lithuania not only in the Suwałki Region but also in Vilnius. The Polish leader, Józef Piłsudski, feared that the Entente and the League might accept the fait accompli that had been created by the Soviet transfer of Vilnius to Lithuania on August 26, 1920. Already on September 22, Sapieha asked Paderewski to gauge the possible reaction of the League in case military units in the Kresy decided to attack Vilnius, following the example of the Italian Gabriele D'Annunzio, who in 1919 staged a mutiny and took over the city of Fiume. By agreeing to the negotiations, the Poles sought to buy time and distract attention from the Vilnius Region. The Lithuanians hoped to avoid new Polish attacks and, with the help of the League, to settle the disputes.

The conference began in the evening of September 29, 1920. The Polish delegation was led by colonel Mieczysław Mackiewicz (who originated from Lithuania), and the Lithuanian delegation by general Maksimas Katche. Lithuania proposed an immediate armistice, but the Polish delegation refused. Only after the Lithuanian delegation threatened to leave the negotiation table did Poland agree to stop fighting, but only to the west of the Neman River (the Suwałki Region). Fighting to the east of the river continued. The Polish delegates demanded that the Lithuanians allow the Polish forces to use a portion of the Saint Petersburg–Warsaw railway and the train station in Varėna (Orany). The Lithuanians refused: their major forces were concentrated in the Suwałki Region and moving them to protect Vilnius without the railway would be extremely difficult. The Lithuanian side was ready to give up the Suwałki Region in exchange for Poland's recognition of the Lithuanian claims to Vilnius.

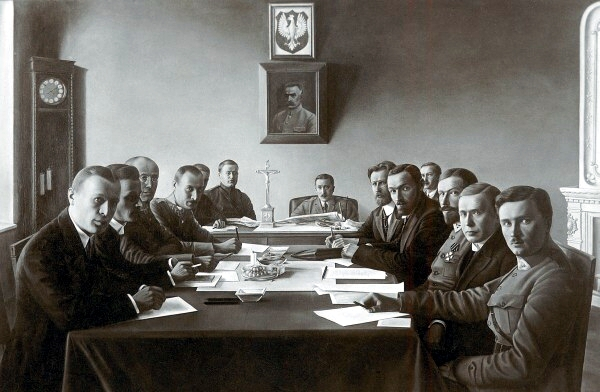
Polish (left) and Lithuanian (right) delegates at the negotiation table during the Suwałki Conference

The Lithuanian delegation, after consultations in Kaunas on October 2, proposed their demarcation line on October 3. The line would be withdrawn about 50–80 km (31–50 mi) from the border determined by the Soviet–Lithuanian Peace Treaty. On October 4, the Polish delegation, after consultations with Piłsudski, presented a counter-offer. In essence, the Lithuanians wanted a longer demarcation line to provide better protection for Vilnius and the Poles pushed for a shorter line. While Vilnius was not a topic of debate, it was on everybody's mind. On the same day the Control Commission, sent by the League according to its resolution of September 20, arrived in Suwałki to mediate the talks. The commission, led by French colonel Pierre Chardigny, included representatives from Italy, Great Britain, Spain, and Japan.

On October 5, 1920, the Control Commission presented a concrete proposal to draw the demarcation line up to the village of Utieka on the Neman River, about 10 km (6.2 mi) south of Merkinė, and to establish a 12 km (7.5 mi) wide neutral zone along the line. On October 6, negotiations continued regarding an extension of the demarcation line. The Poles refused to move it past the village of Bastuny, claiming that the Polish army needed freedom to manoeuvre against the Soviet troops, even though a provisional ceasefire agreement had been reached with Soviet Russia on October 5. The Poles proposed to discuss further demarcation lines in Riga, where Poland and Russia negotiated the Peace of Riga. On the same day fighting east of the Neman River ceased as Polish troops captured the Varėna train station. On October 7, at midnight, the final Suwałki Agreement was signed. On October 8, the Control Commission stated that they could not see why the demarcation line could not be extended further than Bastuny and urged another round of negotiations.

== Provisions of the agreement ==
Selected lines of demarcation between Lithuania and Poland, 1919–1939. Light orange line denotes the line drawn by the Suwałki Agreement.

The agreement was finally signed on October 7, 1920; the ceasefire was to begin at noon on October 10. Notably, the treaty made not a single reference to Vilnius or the Vilnius Region. The agreement contained the following articles:

- Article I: on the demarcation line; besides setting it out, it also stated that the line "in no way prejudices the territorial claims of the two Contracting Parties". The demarcation line would start in the west following the Curzon Line until it reached the Neman River. It would follow the Neman and Merkys Rivers, leaving the town of Varėna to the Lithuanians, but its train station on the Polish side. From Varėna the line would follow Barteliai–Kinčai–Naujadvaris–Eišiškės–Bastuny (Bastūnai, Бастынь). The train station in Bastuny also remained in Polish hands. The demarcation line east of Bastuny was to be determined by a separate agreement.
- Article II: on the ceasefire; notably the ceasefire was to take place only along the demarcation line, not on the entire Polish–Lithuanian frontline (i.e. not east of Bastuny).
- Article III: on the train station in Varėna; it was to remain under Polish control but the Polish side promised unrestricted passage of civilian trains, but only two military trains per day
- Article IV: on prisoner exchange.
- Article V: on the date and time the ceasefire would start (October 10 at noon) and expire (when all territorial disputes are resolved) and which map was to be used.

== Aftermath ==
The demarcation line drawn through the Suwałki Region for the most part remains the border between Poland and Lithuania in modern times; notably the towns of Sejny, Suwałki and Augustów remained on the Polish side. In the 21st century, the Suwałki Region (the present-day Podlaskie Voivodeship) remains home to the Lithuanian minority in Poland.

The most controversial issue – the future of the city of Vilnius – was not explicitly addressed. When the agreement was signed, Vilnius was garrisoned by Lithuanian troops and behind the Lithuanian lines. Yet this changed almost immediately when the staged Żeligowski's Mutiny began on October 8. Soon after the mutiny, Léon Bourgeois, President of the Council of the League of Nations, expressed strong disapproval, asserting that Żeligowski's actions were a violation of the engagements entered into with the Council of the League of Nations, and demanding the immediate Polish evacuation of the city.

In Piłsudski's view, signing even such a limited agreement was not in Poland's best interests, and he disapproved of it. In a 1923 speech acknowledging that he had directed Żeligowski's coup, Piłsudski stated:

I tore up the Suwałki Treaty, and afterwards I issued a false communique by the General Staff.

Żeligowski and his mutineers captured Vilnius, established the Republic of Central Lithuania, and after a disputed election in 1922, incorporated the republic into Poland. The conflict over the city dragged on until World War II. In the 21st century, the Vilnius Region is the major center of the Polish minority in Lithuania.

== Evaluations and historiography ==
While the Lithuanian side considered the agreement to be an enforceable political treaty, the Polish side considered it to be a minor military agreement, later superseded by a ceasefire agreement between Lithuania and Żeligowski reached on November 29. American historian Alfred Erich Senn has argued that it was not a regular political treaty, as it did not require ratification, but the presence of political representatives of both sides indicated that it was not a mere military agreement. Lithuanian historian Tomas Balkelis described the agreement as "a purely military agreement that established a new demarcation line." Poland and Lithuania also disagreed about the agreement's relation to the Vilnius question, which was not explicitly addressed in the treaty. The Lithuanian side considered that the agreement assigned Vilnius to Lithuania, while the Polish side argued that it did not concern Vilnius or other territorial claims. Senn has described the agreement as tacitly leaving Vilnius to Lithuania.

Finally, the Lithuanian side considered the Żeligowski's attack on Vilnius a violation of the Suwałki agreement and as a major argument in international mediation. Poland disagreed and protested such an interpretation of the document. At first, Poland claimed that Żeligowski was a rebel who acted without approval from the Polish government. Later Piłsudski's role in the attack was acknowledged, but the Polish side argued that the agreement was not violated, as the attack was held to the east from the demarcation line. The League of Nations considered the Polish attack a violation of the agreement, but placed emphasis on the resumption of the hostilities and not subsequent territorial changes. Senn said the view that the agreement has not been violated was "specious". In his opinion, Piłsudski himself did not seem to share that view, as evidenced by his attempt to pretend that the attacking forces were "rebels".

In most cases, historians summarise the issue by saying that the agreement assigned Vilnius to Lithuania and the Polish attack violated it. However, Piotr Łossowski argued that such summaries are inadequate and misleading.

== See also ==
- Lithuanian–Polish relations
- Lithuania–Poland border

== Sources ==
- Abdelal, Rawi (2001). National Purpose in the World Economy: Post-Soviet States in Comparative Perspective. Cornell University Press. ISBN 978-0-8014-8977-8.
- Abramowicz, Hirsz; Dobkin, Eva Zeitlin; Shandler, Jeffrey; Fishman, David E. (1999). Profiles of a Lost World: Memoirs of East European Jewish Life Before World War II. Wayne State University Press. ISBN 978-0-8143-2784-5.
- Balkelis, Tomas (2018). War, Revolution, and Nation-making in Lithuania, 1914–1923. Oxford University Press. ISBN 9780199668021.
- Eidintas, Alfonsas; Žalys, Vytautas; Senn, Alfred Erich (September 1999). Tuskenis, Edvardas (ed.). Lithuania in European Politics: The Years of the First Republic, 1918–1940. New York: St. Martin's Press. ISBN 0-312-22458-3.
- Kitowski, Jerzy (2006). Regional Transborder Co-operation in Countries of Central and Eastern Europe: A Balance of Achievements. Geopolitical Studies. Vol. 14. Polska Akademia Nauk. OCLC 127107582.
- Lukas, Richard C. (1961). "Graduate Student Essay The Seizure of Vilna, October 1920". Historian. 23 (2): 244–245. doi:10.1111/j.1540-6563.1961.tb01685.x.
- Miniotaitė, Gražina (2003). "The Baltic States: In Search of Security and Identity". In Krupnick, Charles (ed.). Almost NATO: Partners and Players in Central and Eastern European Security. The New International Relations of Europe. Rowman & Littlefield. ISBN 0-7425-2459-0.
- Nichol, James P. (1995). Diplomacy in the Former Soviet Republics. Greenwood Publishing Group. ISBN 0-275-95192-8.
- Price, Glanville (1998). Encyclopedia of the Languages of Europe. Blackwell Publishing. ISBN 978-0-8014-8977-8.
- Rauch, Georg von (1970). The Baltic States: The Years of Independence. University of California Press. ISBN 0-520-02600-4.
- Ray, Michael (2024-04-13). "Vilnius dispute". Encyclopædia Britannica.
- Senn, Alfred Erich (1966). The Great Powers: Lithuania and the Vilna Question, 1920–1928. Studies in East European history. Leiden: E. J. Brill. LCCN 67086623.
- Slocombe, George (1970). A Mirror to Geneva: Its Growth, Grandeur, and Decay. Ayer Publishing. ISBN 0-8369-1852-5.
- Snyder, Timothy (2004). The Reconstruction of Nations: Poland, Ukraine, Lithuania, Belarus, 1569–1999. Yale University Press. ISBN 0-300-10586-X.
- Ther, Philipp; Siljak, Ana (2001). Redrawing Nations: Ethnic Cleansing in East-Central Europe, 1944–1948. Rowman & Littlefield. ISBN 0-7425-1094-8.
- Vitas, Robert A. (1984-02-03). "The Polish–Lithuanian Crisis of 1938". Lituanus. 2 (30). ISSN 0024-5089. Archived from the original on 2008-03-23.

=== Lithuanian-language sources ===
- Ališauskas, Kazys (1958). "Lietuvos kariuomenė (1918–1944)". Lietuvių enciklopedija (in Lithuanian). Vol. XV. Boston, Massachusetts: Lietuvių enciklopedijos leidykla. LCCN 55020366.
- Lesčius, Vytautas (2004). Lietuvos kariuomenė nepriklausomybės kovose 1918–1920 (in Lithuanian). Vilnius: Generolo Jono Žemaičio Lietuvos karo akademija. ISBN 9955-423-23-4. Archived from the original on 2 February 2017.
- Vilkelis, Gintaras (2006). Lietuvos ir Lenkijos santykiai Tautų Sąjungoje (in Lithuanian). Versus aureus. ISBN 9955-601-92-2.

=== Polish-language sources ===
- Sobczyński, Marek (2016). "Procesy integracyjne i dezintegracyjne na ziemiach litewskich w toku dziejów" (PDF). University of Łódź. Archived from the original (PDF) on 4 March 2016.
- Łossowski, Piotr (1995). Konflikt polsko-litewski 1918–1920 (in Polish). Warsaw: Książka i Wiedza. ISBN 83-05-12769-9.
