= Polish–Lithuanian War =

Conflict between Poland and Lithuania, 1919-1920

- Part of the Lithuanian Wars of Independence and the Polish–Soviet War
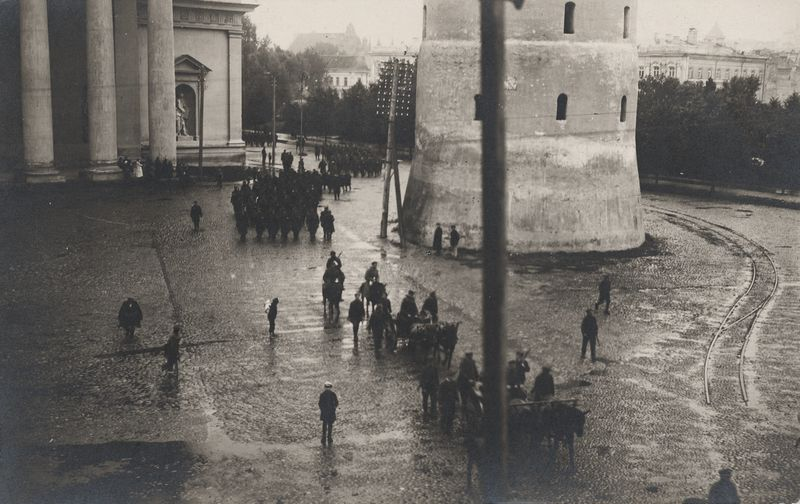
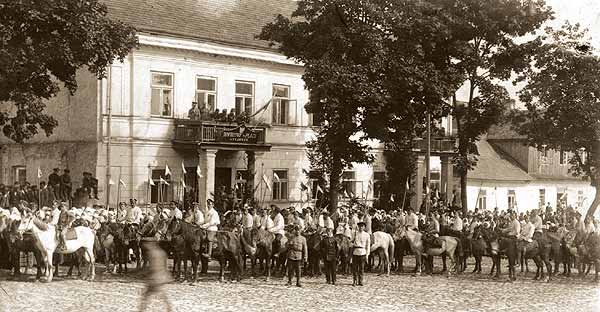
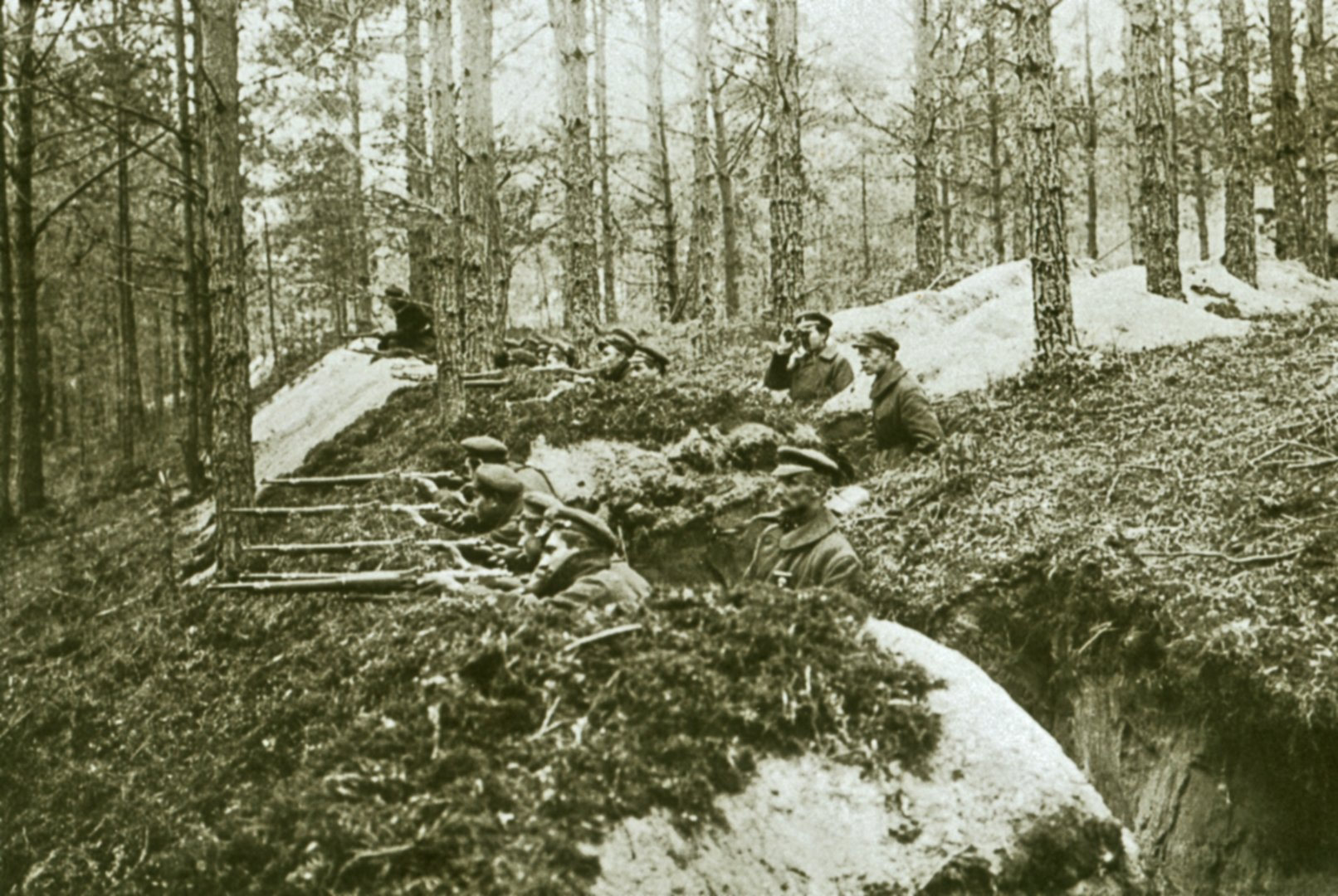
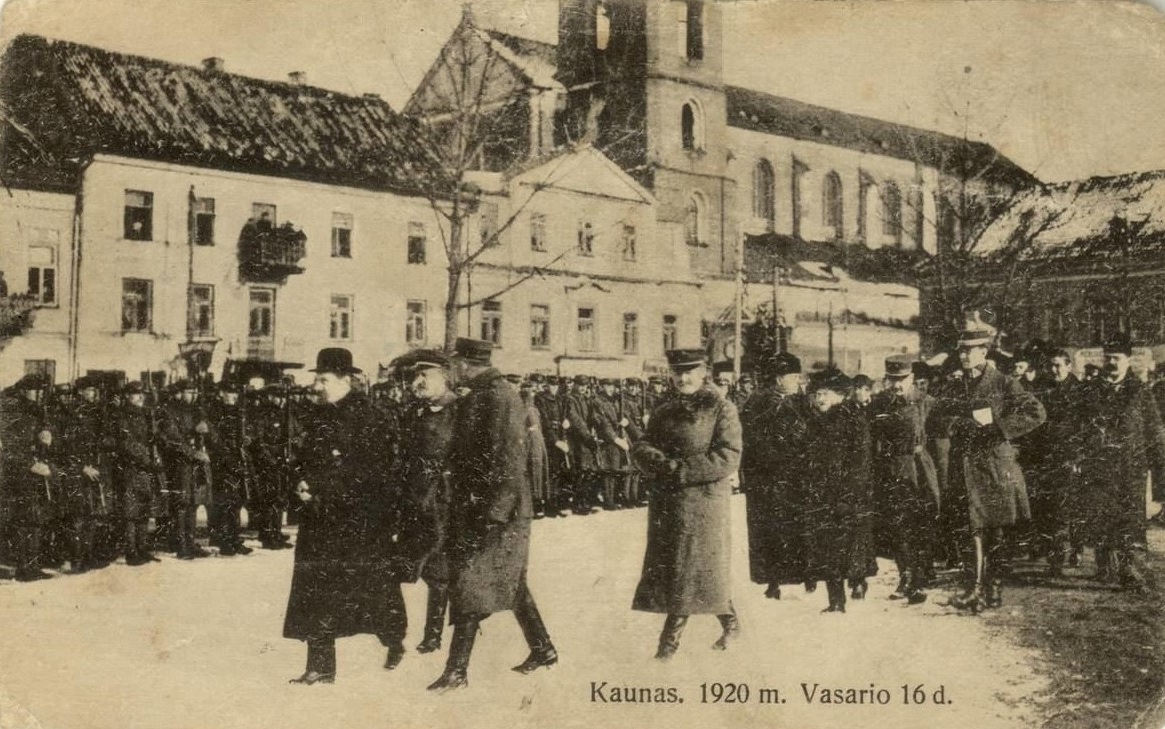
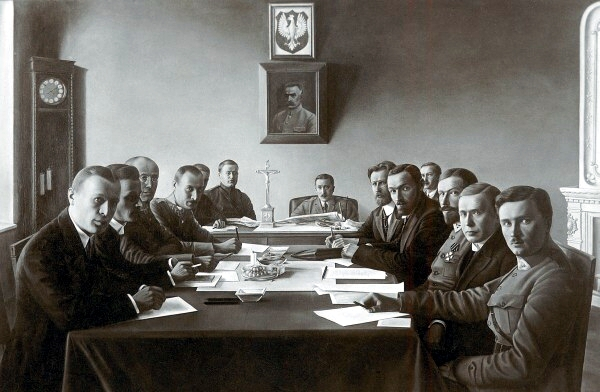
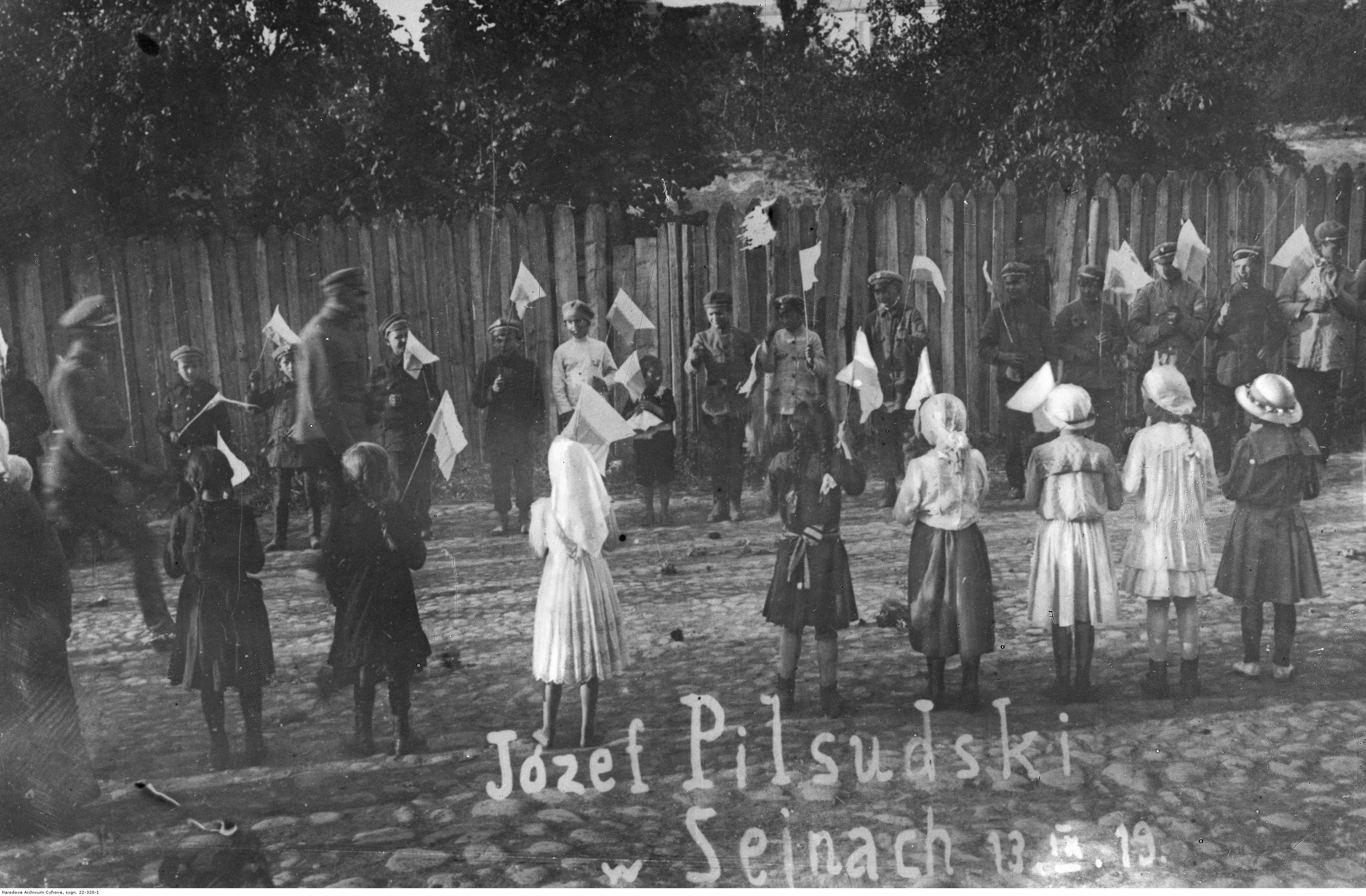
- Clockwise from top left: The Lithuanian Army in Cathedral Square, Vilnius in 1920; Polish cavalry parade in Sejny; Antanas Smetona inspecting Lithuanian soldiers on February 16, 1920, in Kaunas during the commemoration of the Act of Independence of Lithuania; Józef Piłsudski in Sejny on August 13, 1919; Lithuanian and Polish delegations negotiating the Suwałki Agreement, October 1920; The Lithuanian 5th Infantry Regiment in Vievis' forests fighting against Żeligowski's soldiers in autumn 1920
Date	May 1919 – November 29, 1920
Location	Suwałki and Vilnius regions
Result	Polish victory
Territorial changes	Suwałki and Vilnius regions ruled by Poland (with some adjacent areas) until 1939

Belligerents
Poland; Central Lithuania (1920)	Lithuania

Commanders and leaders
(Second Polish Republic) Józef Piłsudski; (Second Polish Republic) Adam Nieniewski; (Second Polish Republic) Lucjan Żeligowski	(Lithuania) Silvestras Žukauskas; (Lithuania) Stasys Nastopka (surrendered); (Lithuania) Antanas Smetona; (Lithuania) Mykolas Sleževičius; (Lithuania) Konstantinas Žukas

Casualties and losses
264 dead (incomplete data)	232 dead against the Polish army; 222 dead against Żeligowski's troops

The Polish–Lithuanian War was an undeclared war fought in the aftermath of World War I between newly independent Lithuania and Poland, with fighting mainly in the Vilnius and Suwałki regions, which was part of the Lithuanian Wars of Independence and lasted from May 1919 to 29 November 1920. From the spring of 1920 onward, the conflict happened alongside the wider Polish–Soviet War and was affected by its progress. It was subject to unsuccessful international mediation at the Conference of Ambassadors and the League of Nations.

After World War I, the military and political situation in the region was chaotic, as multiple countries, notably Lithuania, Poland, and Soviet Russia, vied with each other over control of overlapping areas. (Note: Polish and Lithuanian claims overlapped in parts of the former Vilna, Grodno, and Suwałki governorates.) The Polish–Lithuanian conflict was centered on Vilnius, which the Council of Lithuania declared the capital of the restored Lithuanian state. Control of Vilnius was transferred from Germans to Poles on January 2, 1919, but the Polish paramilitary lost the city to the Bolsheviks on January 5. The Polish Army seized Vilnius again on April 19, 1919 and came in contact with the Lithuanian Army fighting in the Lithuanian–Soviet War. Despite the antagonism over Vilnius, the Lithuanian and Polish armies sometimes cooperated when fighting against a common enemy, the Bolsheviks. As Lithuanian–Polish relations worsened, the Entente drew two demarcation lines in hopes to stall further hostilities. The lines did not please either side and were ignored. The first clashes between Polish and Lithuanian soldiers occurred on April 26 and May 8, 1919, near Vievis. With the Polish coup against the Lithuanian government failing in August 1919, the front stabilized until the summer of 1920.

In July 1920, Polish forces retreated due to reverses in the Polish–Soviet War and the Lithuanians followed the retreating troops to secure their lands as delineated in the Soviet–Lithuanian Peace Treaty. However, the Red Army was the first to enter Vilnius. In August 1920, Poland won the Battle of Warsaw and forced the Soviets to retreat. The Polish Army encountered Lithuanian opposition, defending their new borders, which the Polish government considered illegitimate. Thus, the Polish invaded Lithuanian-controlled territory during the Battle of Sejny. Pressured by the League of Nations, Poland signed the Suwałki Agreement on October 7, 1920. The agreement left the Suwałki region on the Polish side and drew a new incomplete demarcation line, which left Vilnius vulnerable to a flanking maneuver.

On October 8, 1920, Polish general Lucjan Żeligowski staged a mutiny, secretly planned and authorized by the Polish chief of state Józef Piłsudski. Żeligowski's forces marched on Vilnius and captured it one day before the Suwałki Agreement was to formally come into effect. Żeligowski proclaimed the creation of the Republic of Central Lithuania with its capital in Vilnius. Their further offensive towards Kaunas, the temporary capital of Lithuania, was halted by the Lithuanians, who thus defended their independence. On November 29, 1920, a ceasefire was signed. Overall, from early 1919 to late 1920, Vilnius would switch rule (Note: The Lithuanian government was established in Vilnius in November 1918 and attempts were made to organize a Lithuanian Army. On January 2, 1919, the Lithuanian government and Taryba evacuated the city, while the Germans gave control over Vilnius to the local Poles that same day. The Polish forces lost Vilnius to the Red Army several days later, on January 5. The Polish Army recaptured the city from the Bolsheviks in April 1919 and it remained under Polish control until July 1920.) as many as seven times between Lithuanians, Poles and the Bolsheviks. The Republic of Central Lithuania was incorporated into Poland as the Wilno Voivodeship in 1922. The prolonged mediation by the League of Nations did not change the situation and the status quo was accepted in 1923. In March 1923, the Conference of Ambassadors recognized the armistice line as a de jure Polish–Lithuanian border, awarding Vilnius to Poland. However, the International Court of Justice in The Hague arbitrated in 1931 that Poland broke international law by occupying Vilnius. Lithuania remained adamant regarding its claim to Vilnius as its constitutional capital throughout the whole interwar, and breaking all diplomatic relations with Poland due to the latter's control of the city. Diplomatic relations were only restored as a result of the March 1938 Polish ultimatum to Lithuania. Vilnius was regained by Lithuania on 28 October 1939, following the Soviet–Lithuanian Mutual Assistance Treaty, twenty years after losing its capital. However, Lithuania as a whole lost its independence less than a year later following the Soviet ultimatum and occupation of the Baltic states.

== Background ==
=== Demographic situation ===
According to the 1897 Russian census, the disputed city of Vilnius had a linguistic breakdown of 30% Polish-speaking, 40% Jews, and 2% Lithuanian-speaking; however, the percentage of Lithuanian speakers in the surrounding countryside was a few times higher than that of Polish speakers – the population was 35% Lithuanian- and 12% Polish-speaking in Vilnius county (if excluding its centre – Vilnius city), and in Trakai county it was 59% Lithuanian- and 11% Polish-speaking. According to the 1916 German census, Poles were the most numerous among all local nationalities and constituted 53% or 53.67% of the city's population, 50% in the entire Vilnius census region and the vast majority in the Vilnius census district.

=== Military developments ===
The advance of Polish (blue arrows), Lithuanian/German (dark purple arrows) against the Soviet forces in early 1919. The blue line shows the Polish front in May 1920.

World War I ended when Germany signed the Armistice of 11 November 1918. On November 13, Soviet Russia renounced the Treaty of Brest-Litovsk and began the Soviet westward offensive of 1918–1919. The Bolsheviks followed retreating Imperial German Army troops and attacked Lithuania and Poland from the east trying to prevent their independence. They attempted to spread the global proletarian revolution, establish Soviet republics in the region, and join the German and the Hungarian Revolutions. The Soviet offensive sparked a series of local wars, including the Polish–Soviet War and the Lithuanian–Soviet War.

At the end of 1918, four groups claiming authority existed in Vilnius: the occupational Ober Ost German government, which was preparing to leave the city; the Lithuanian government under Augustinas Voldemaras that had just begun creating the Lithuanian Army; the Polish Committee and the Polish Temporary National Council for Lithuania supported by armed units of the Self-Defence of Lithuania and Belarus; and Vilnius Soviet of Workers Deputies waiting for the Red Army. The Germans refused to provide weapons to Polish paramilitary units which intended to fight the approaching Red Army. The Ober Ost command also denied the Polish request to grant the Polish Land Forces free passage to Vilnius. The Polish Self-Defence was formally absorbed into the Polish Army at the end of December. On 2 January 1919, Poles took over Vilnius from the retreating German troops and the fighting with the city's Bolshevik Worker's Soviet (capturing around 1,000 weapons). Nonetheless, the last German soldiers left the city only on January 4. The Lithuanian government failed to organize a defense of Vilnius. Both the Polish and Lithuanian political leadership realized their inability to resist the invading Bolshevik forces. Hence, on January 2, the Council of Lithuania evacuated from Vilnius to Kaunas. After some fighting, the local Polish forces lost Vilnius to the Bolsheviks on January 5. Lithuanians relied on the aid of German troops to stop the Red Army offensive before it reached Kaunas.

At first, the Soviets were successful but this came to a halt in February 1919 due to failures at the battles of Jieznas, Kėdainiai, and Alytus. On February 5, Poland signed an agreement with Germany regulating the withdrawal of the German army from western Belarus and giving the Polish army the opportunity to march eastward. On February 14, 1919, Polish troops came into contact with the Bolshevik army near Vawkavysk. On April 16, 1919, the Polish Army launched a wide-ranging offensive against the Bolsheviks from Lida to Vilnius. On April 19, 1919, the Polish cavalry under Władysław Belina-Prażmowski captured Vilnius. On April 22, 1919, Józef Piłsudski issued the Proclamation to the inhabitants of the former Grand Duchy of Lithuania, in which he announced that the region's fate would be decided democratically. He also established the Civil Administration of the Eastern Lands, headed by Jerzy Osmołowski. An important strategic success for the Polish side was the capture of Grodno on April 28, 1919, from which the Germans withdrew.

After that, Polish troops advanced further west and northwest. The situation was utilized by the Lithuanian army, which entered Ukmergė on May 3, and started an offensive further south and southwest. Polish–Lithuanian relations at the time were not immediately hostile, both armies met in several points (Merkinė, Vievis and Širvintos), and even cooperated against the Bolsheviks in Giedraičiai area on May 11, 1919.

At first, both Poles and Lithuanians cooperated against the Soviets, but soon the cooperation gave way to increasing hostility. Lithuania claimed neutrality in the Polish–Soviet War. As the Polish Army forced its way further into Lithuania, the first clashes between Polish and Lithuanian soldiers occurred on April 26 and May 8, 1919, near Vievis. Though there was no formal state of war and few casualties, by July newspapers reported increasing clashes between Poles and Lithuanians, primarily around the towns of Merkinė and Širvintos. Direct negotiations in Kaunas between May 28 and June 11, 1919, collapsed as neither side agreed to compromise. Lithuania tried to avoid direct military conflict and submitted its case for mediation to the Conference of Ambassadors.

In the Suwałki region, Lithuanian troops, supported by German troops, were advancing in a southerly direction. The entire region was under the control of the German army, which allowed in the southern part to organize Polish administrations and to hold elections to the Polish Sejm in the counties of Augustów, Suwałki and Sejny. However, at the same time, they allowed the formation of Lithuanian administrations in the northern part. Lithuanians controlled Sejny from mid-1918, and entered Suwałki on May 8, 1919.

=== Diplomatic developments ===
While World War I was still ongoing, under German tutelage, the two sides established diplomatic ties, signing an agreement in Berlin on 30 June 1918. Lithuania was represented by Augustinas Voldemaras and Konstantinas Olšauskas, while Poland was represented by Adam Ronikier. Both sides recognized each other's statehood. In the treaty, Lithuania guaranteed the rights of the Polish minority, while Poland promised to refrain from anti-Lithuanian propaganda. Voldemaras later maintained that Ronikier renounced Polish claims to Vilnius. However, Alfred E. Senn wrote that the issue of the border and the belonging of Vilnius was not addressed in the treaty, while according to Pranas Čepėnas and Wiktor Sukiennicki the signed agreement mentioned nothing regarding territorial questions. The treaty (published in full by Raimundas Lopata) was of interim nature and stated only that: "With regard to the frontier, a principle of a common frontier is accepted, which will be determined by a joint agreement based on ethnic, historic and economic principles". After the Germans had withdrawn, the Lithuanian side pressed for Poland's recognition of an independent Lithuania with its capital in Vilnius, which the Polish leadership consistently rejected.

Polish leader Józef Piłsudski hoped to revive the old Polish–Lithuanian Commonwealth (see the Intermarium federation) and campaigned for some kind of Polish–Lithuanian union in the Paris Peace Conference. Oppositional Endecja desired Lithuania's annexation to Poland, with granting Lithuanians territorial autonomy within ethnic boundaries. Poland also did not intend to make any territorial concessions and justified its actions not only as part of a military campaign against the Soviets but also as the right of self-determination of local Poles. Due to Polish–Lithuanian tensions, the Allied Powers withheld diplomatic recognition of Lithuania until 1922.

The Lithuanians claimed Vilnius as their historical capital and refused any federation with Poland, desiring an independent Lithuanian state. They regarded Polish federalism as a recreation of Polish cultural and political dominance. The Lithuanian government in Kaunas, designated as the temporary capital, deemed the Polish presence in Vilnius as an illegal occupation. In addition to the Vilnius Region, the Suwałki Region was also disputed. It had a mixed Polish and Lithuanian population.

At the time the international situations of newly independent Poland and Lithuania were unequal. Poland, much larger in territory and population, was dedicated point #13 in Woodrow Wilson's Fourteen Points. It was recognized by all nations of the Entente, officially invited to the Paris Peace Conference, and became one of the founding members of the League of Nations. Poland also enjoyed a close alliance with France.

Lithuania did not receive international recognition (it was first recognized de jure in July 1920 by Soviet Russia as part of the peace treaty) as the Entente hoped to revive the Russian Empire within its former territory, which included Lithuania. Lithuania was looking for support in Germany and Russia. In Paris, Voldemaras made contact with Russian delegates to the Paris Conference, who resented an independent Poland and were also interested in limiting its influence in the east and blocking a Polish-Lithuanian agreement. However, they had no real power in Russia, besides that they themselves considered Lithuania part of Russia, so no agreement was reached. Contacts with the Germans were much more fruitful. Germany realized that France was interested in a strong Polish ally east of Germany; so Germany, for its part, supported the building of Lithuania, which would be unfriendly to Poland. Threatened from both sides, the Lithuanian government turned to Germany for military and financial assistance. German troops remained in Kaunas in early 1919, and the government was supported by German loans. The military presence in Lithuania also gave Germany cover for East Prussia and the ability to control the situation in Russia.

The Lithuanian delegation was also present at the Paris Peace Conference, where its leader Augustinas Voldemaras focused on receiving recognition of independent Lithuania and its borders. Voldemaras demanded 125,000 square kilometers for Lithuania, not only with Vilnius but also Suwałki and Białystok. He also accused Poland of being partitionist, and portrayed Poland as an anti-Semitic state that was a threat to Lithuanian Jews. On the other hand, Voldemaras battled negative propaganda that the Council of Lithuania was a German puppet, that Lithuanians harboured pro-Bolshevik attitudes, or that Lithuania was too small and weak to survive without a union with Poland. Under article 87 of the Versailles Treaty, the Principal Allied Powers reserved to themselves the right to determine Poland's eastern frontier.

The war situation and the unstable political situation in both countries did not facilitate contacts between the two governments. Lithuanians protested the presence of Polish troops on Lithuanian territory in early January 1919, but the information reached Warsaw when Vilnius was already in Bolshevik hands. The Poles responded on February 12 by rejecting Lithuanian demands for lands they considered their own, but offered to open direct diplomatic talks. The Lithuanian delegation reached Warsaw on April 18, a day before the entrance of Polish troops to Vilnius.

Meanwhile, Michal Römer, a Lithuanian patriot and veteran of Polish Legions under Piłsudski, went to Kaunas on a mission, and was expected to convince Lithuanian politicians of federation. However, he only found understanding among Lithuanians of Polish culture. On April 17, Lithuanian politicians categorically rejected the federation's proposals.

The Lithuanian delegation, led by Jurgis Šaulys, held talks with Polish Prime Minister Ignacy Jan Paderewski on May 13 and 23, and with Polish Head of State Józef Piłsudski on May 21. The Polish side, strengthened by its possession of Vilnius, insisted on the establishment of a federation, with a common foreign policy, army command, railroad, treasury and post office, promising to establish borders favorable to Lithuania. The Lithuanian side, on the other hand, demanded recognition of an independent Lithuania with Vilnius as its capital. The talks failed, with the only result being the establishment of a Lithuanian consulate in Warsaw, headed by Antanas Kasakaitis.

== May–September 1919: rising tensions ==
=== Demarcation lines ===
The Conference of Ambassadors drew the first demarcation line on June 18, 1919. The line, drawn about 5 km (3.1 mi) west of the Grodno–Vilnius–Daugavpils Railway, was based on the military situation on the ground rather than ethnic composition. Neither Poles nor Lithuanians were content with the line. The Polish Ministry of Foreign Affairs rejected the line as it would require the Polish forces to retreat up to 35 km (22 mi). The line also left the entire Suwałki region, with exception of Augustów, on the Lithuanian side. The Lithuanians protested leaving Vilnius and Grodno under Polish control. As German volunteers were departing from Lithuania and Lithuanian forces were preoccupied with battles against the Soviets in northern Lithuania, Poland ignored the demarcation line and moved its forces on a 100 km (62 mi) wide front 20–30 km (12–19 mi) deeper eastward.

On July 18, Ferdinand Foch proposed the second demarcation line, known as the Foch Line. It was approved by the Entente on July 26. The Lithuanians were informed about the new line only on August 3. Two major modifications favorable to the Poles were made: the Suwałki Region was assigned to Poland and the entire line was moved about 7 km (4.3 mi) west. Again, both Poles and Lithuanians protested the line as it would require them to withdraw their armies from the Vilnius and Suwałki Regions respectively. The German administration, which had not yet retreated from the Suwałki Region, also opposed the Foch Line. The new line did not immediately halt the hostilities. After a couple of Polish attacks on July 29 and August 2, the front stabilized.

=== Sejny Uprising ===
The Lithuanians retreated from Suwałki on August 7, 1919. However, they stopped in ethnically mixed Sejny and formed a line on the Czarna Hańcza River – Wigry Lake. They showed their intention to stay there permanently, which caused concern among the local Poles. On August 12, they organized a rally in Suwałki demanding incorporation into Poland. Lithuanians also held a rally in Kaunas on August 17 protesting the Foch line, and a similar rally was later held in Sejny, where Prime Minister Mykolas Sleževičius arrived.

The Sejny branch of Polish Military Organisation (PMO) began preparing for an uprising, scheduled for the night of August 22 to 23, 1919, right after German troops left the city. Between 900 and 1,200 partisans joined PMO forces. On August 23, the Poles captured Sejny and attacked Lazdijai and Kapčiamiestis, towns on the Lithuanian side of the Foch Line. The insurgents planned to march as far as Simnas. Lithuanians recaptured Sejny on August 25 for a few hours. On August 26, regular Polish forces – the 41st Infantry Regiment – joined the PMO volunteers. On September 5, the Lithuanians agreed to withdraw behind the Foch Line by September 7. Poland secured Sejny and repressed Lithuanian cultural life: the Sejny Priest Seminary was expelled, Lithuanian schools and cultural organizations closed. After the uprising, the mistrust of Poles prompted Lithuanian intelligence to intensify its investigations of Polish activities in Lithuania. This helped to detect and prevent a planned coup d'état in Kaunas to overthrow the government of Lithuania.

=== Polish coup attempt ===
Sometime in mid-July 1919, PMO forces in Vilnius began planning a coup to replace the Lithuanian government with a pro-Polish cabinet, which would agree to a union with Poland (the proposed Międzymorze federation). Polish leader Józef Piłsudski believed there were enough Polish sympathizers in Lithuania to carry out the coup. On August 3, a Polish diplomatic mission, led by Leon Wasilewski and Tadeusz Kasprzycki, in Kaunas had a double purpose: propose a plebiscite in the contested territories and assess preparedness for the coup. On August 6, the Lithuanian government rejected the plebiscite proposal, stating that the disputed territories constitute ethnographic Lithuania. According to Lithuanian historian Kazys Ališauskas, PMO planned to capture and hold Kaunas for a few hours until the arrival of the regular Polish troops, situated only some 40–50 km (25–31 mi) east from the city. Piłsudski and his entourage were sincerely convinced that Taryba, who ruled Lithuania, had no real popular support and was merely a German creation. They were bolstered in this conviction by intra-Lithuanian quarrels, primarily between Lithuanian émigré leader Juozas Gabrys and newly elected President Smetona, who lacked democratic legitimacy. This conviction was reinforced by the constant presence of the German army in Lithuania. The Germans' departure from Kaunas on July 11, 1919, created the conditions for military action. Polish newspapers ran a propaganda campaign claiming that the Council of Lithuania was simply a German puppet.

It managed to win the support of some Lithuanian politicians, most notably the aforementioned Gabrys, Defense Ministry employee Jurgis Aukštuolaitis, and even Lithuanian army commander Silvestras Žukauskas. However, it was not much, greater success was achieved in gaining the support of Kaunas Poles. The coup was initially scheduled for the night of August 27 to 28 but was postponed to September 1. The outbreak of the Sejny uprising, which reinforced resentment against Poles in Lithuania, further hindered the success of the coup.

The postponement of the start of the coup turned out to be a fatal mistake, as some PMO units did not receive information about it and began operations on the original date, disrupting telegraph connections between Kaunas and the rest of the country. Lithuanian intelligence discovered the coup, but did not have a list of PMO members. Lithuanian authorities began mass arrests of some 200 Polish activists, including 23 officers of the Lithuanian Army. Kaunas was declared in a state of siege. Polish press saw mass arrests of Polish activists "to whom no charge can be ascribed other than being Poles" as proof of systematic anti-Polish policies of the German-ridden Lithuanian government. Another wave of arrests took place on September 9 in Kaišiadorys, an important railroad junction, where about 100 people were arrested. The PMO was little affected by the arrests and scheduled another coup attempt for the end of September. However, the Lithuanians obtained a full list of PMO members, including 369 names of members and 122 names of Lithuanians sympathetic to the PMO, and liquidated the organization in Lithuania. The wave of arrests included names outside the list. Lithuanian police used this as a pretext to arrest Polish activists, there were even murders.

== September 1919 – June 1920: minor incidents ==
=== Military developments ===
After the failure of the coup in Kaunas, there were numerous small border incidents. On September 17 and 18, Lithuanian troops attacked and occupied Musninkai and Širvintos, and were soon driven from them. On September 19, 1919, Polish troops attacked Gelvonai and encroached towards Ukmergė. On several occasions fights broke out regarding a strategically important bridge over the Šventoji River near Vepriai. In October, when main Lithuanian forces were deployed against the Bermontians in northwestern Lithuania, the attacks intensified. Poles captured Salakas on October 5 and attacked Kapčiamiestis on October 12. While Polish troops were in Latgale, just after the Battle of Daugavpils, Lithuanian troops took over Alanta on January 11, 1920, and Stakliškės on January 14. The front stabilized, but harassment of border guards and local villagers continued throughout early 1920.

In March 1920, fights erupted along the railroad stations in Kalkūni and Turmantas. The situation was investigated by British and French observers and reported to the Entente. The situation somewhat improved only in late spring 1920, when most Polish troops were deployed in Ukraine during the Polish–Soviet War.

At the time Lithuania faced a severe budget crisis – in 1919 its revenue was 72 million while expenses reached 190 million German marks. While the government was struggling to obtain financial assistance and loans, deep cuts affected the army. Instead of increasing its armed forces to 40,000 men, Lithuania was forced to cut them to about 25,000.

=== Diplomatic developments ===
After the failed coup, Leon Wasilewski left Kaunas and settled in Vilnius. There he met twice, on September 15 and 24, with Lithuanian Foreign Minister Augustian Voldemaras. The talks concerned bilateral relations, the possibility of a plebiscite, and ended without any concrete agreements. Wasilewski then began propaganda work involving Lithuanian activists Józef Albin Herbaczewski, priest Antanas Viskantas or Jurgis Aukštuolaitis, who had been released from prison, and published bilingual or Lithuanian-language press for this purpose.

Meanwhile, British influence was increasing in the Baltic States, interested primarily in limiting German, but also French influence. A British military mission was established in Kaunas, headed by Richard Barrington Ward. On September 19, 1919, along with 21 other British officers, General Frank Percy Crozier joined the newly established Lithuanian Army as an advisor to the General Staff. On September 25, 1919, the UK recognized the Lithuanian state de facto. The British also provided military equipment.

Latvia fought against the German-Russian forces of Pavel Bermondt-Avalov. Latvia enjoyed the support of Poland. The fighting spread to Lithuania in October 1919. Poland offered to help, but the Lithuanians refused to allow passage through their territory. Fearing a Polish attack, Lithuania reached an agreement with the Bermontians and signed a truce on October 30, establishing the Tauragė-Šiauliai demacration line. After the Latvian army breached the front, the Lithuanian army joined the counteroffensive. Later clashes were stopped by the intervention of an Entente representative, in order to not interrupt withdrawal of German troops. By December 15, all German forces were completely removed from Lithuania. At the same time, the plenipotentiary of the German government Ludwig Zimmerle was forced to leave Kaunas. On December 30, a Polish-Latvian alliance was signed, resulting in a joint fight for the liberation of Daugavpils, which was successful on January 5, 1920. Lithuanian troops attempted an early entry into the city, but without success.

In April 1920, Lithuania held its first parliamentary elections. Among the constituencies established were cities outside the Lithuanian administration: Vilnius, Lida, Grodno and Białystok. The Polish minority had limited opportunities for election campaigning, the only Polish newspaper was closed down, and as a result Poles received only 3 parliamentary seats. Kazys Grinius became the new prime minister. On May 11, 1920, France recognized Lithuania de facto; and on May 7, 1920, Lithuania began peace talks with Soviet Russia.

== July 1920: Soviet advance and Polish retreat ==
=== Diplomatic developments ===
Advance of Soviet forces (red arrows) against Polish troops in June–August 1920

On 25 April 1920, the Polish army and the remnants of Ukrainian People's Army under Petliura launched the large-scale Kiev offensive following the treaty of alliance. Initially successful, the Polish Army started retreating after Russian counterattacks in early June 1920. Soon the Soviet forces began to threaten Poland's independence as they reached and crossed the Polish borders. On July 9, Polish Prime Minister Władysław Grabski asked the Allied Powers in the Spa Conference for military assistance in the war with the Soviets. The conference proposed that the Polish forces would withdraw behind the Curzon Line, the Soviet forces would stop 50 km (31 mi) to the east of the line, the Lithuanian forces would take control of Vilnius, and all other disputes would be settled via negotiations in London. Grabski opposed the transfer of Vilnius, but under the pressure of British Prime Minister Lloyd George, agreed to the resolution on July 10.

At the same time, the Soviets and Lithuanians negotiated the Soviet–Lithuanian Peace Treaty, which was signed on July 12, 1920. Russia recognized Lithuanian independence and withdrew any territorial claims. The treaty drew the eastern border of Lithuania, which the Lithuanians continued to claim as their de jure state border until World War II. Vilnius Region, including Braslaw (Breslauja), Hrodna (Gardinas), Lida (Lyda), and Vilnius, was recognized to Lithuania. On August 6, after long and heated negotiations, Lithuania and Soviet Russia signed a convention regarding the withdrawal of Russian troops from the recognized Lithuanian territory. However, the troops began to retreat only after the Red Army suffered a heavy defeat in Poland.

=== Territorial changes ===
The Bolshevik forces reached Lithuanian territory on July 7, 1920, and continued to push the Polish troops. The Lithuanian Army moved to secure territories abandoned by the retreating Polish forces, reaching Turmantas on July 7, Tauragnai and Alanta on July 9, Širvintos and Musninkai on July 10, Kernavė, Molėtai, and Giedraičiai on July 11, Maišiagala and Pabradė on July 13. On July 13, the Polish command decided to transfer Vilnius to the Lithuanians following the Spa conference's resolution. Lithuanians moved in, but their trains were stopped by Polish soldiers near Kazimieriškės. Polish soldiers didn't receive orders to let Lithuanian troops go through. This delay meant that the Bolsheviks were the first to enter Vilnius on July 14. By the time the first Lithuanian troops entered the city on July 15, it was already secured by the Soviets. Poland sought to have Russians in the city as it would create much fewer complications when the Polish Army counterattacked. Despite the Peace Treaty, the Soviets did not intend to transfer the city to the Lithuanians. Indeed, there were indications that the Soviets planned a coup against the Lithuanian government in hopes to re-establish the Lithuanian SSR.

Despite the setback in Vilnius, the Lithuanians continued to secure territories in the Suwałki Region. They took Druskininkai on July 17, Vištytis, Punsk, Giby, and Sejny on July 19, Suwałki on July 29, Augustów on August 8. The Polish units, afraid of being surrounded and cut off from the main Polish forces, retreated towards Łomża. The Lithuanian authorities started to organize themselves in the regained areas.

=== Lithuanian neutrality ===
Poland claimed that Lithuania violated its claim to neutrality in the Polish–Soviet War and in effect became a Soviet ally. A secret clause of the Soviet–Lithuanian Peace Treaty allowed Soviet forces unrestricted movement within the Soviet-recognized Lithuanian territory for the duration of Soviet hostilities with Poland. This clause was of a practical matter: Soviet troops already occupied much of the assigned territory and could not withdraw while hostilities with Poland continued. Lithuanians were also simply unable to resist Soviet troops. For example, when Lithuanians refused permission to use a road, the Soviets ignored Lithuanian protests and transported their troops and equipment regardless. At the same time Polish soldiers were disarmed and interned. The largest group, a brigade under colonel Pasławski, was interned on July 18, 1920, near Kruonis. On August 10, Lithuanians held 103 Polish officers and 3,520 private soldiers. Poland also claimed that the Lithuanian troops actively participated in the Red Army's military operations. This charge, based on memoirs of Soviet officials, lacks evidence. Further military clashes between Polish and Lithuanian troops in the Suwałki Region were interpreted by Poland to show that "the Lithuanian government has become an instrument of the Soviet government." Lithuania responded that it was defending its borders.

== August–October 1920: struggles for the Suwałki Region ==
=== Polish advance and Soviet retreat ===
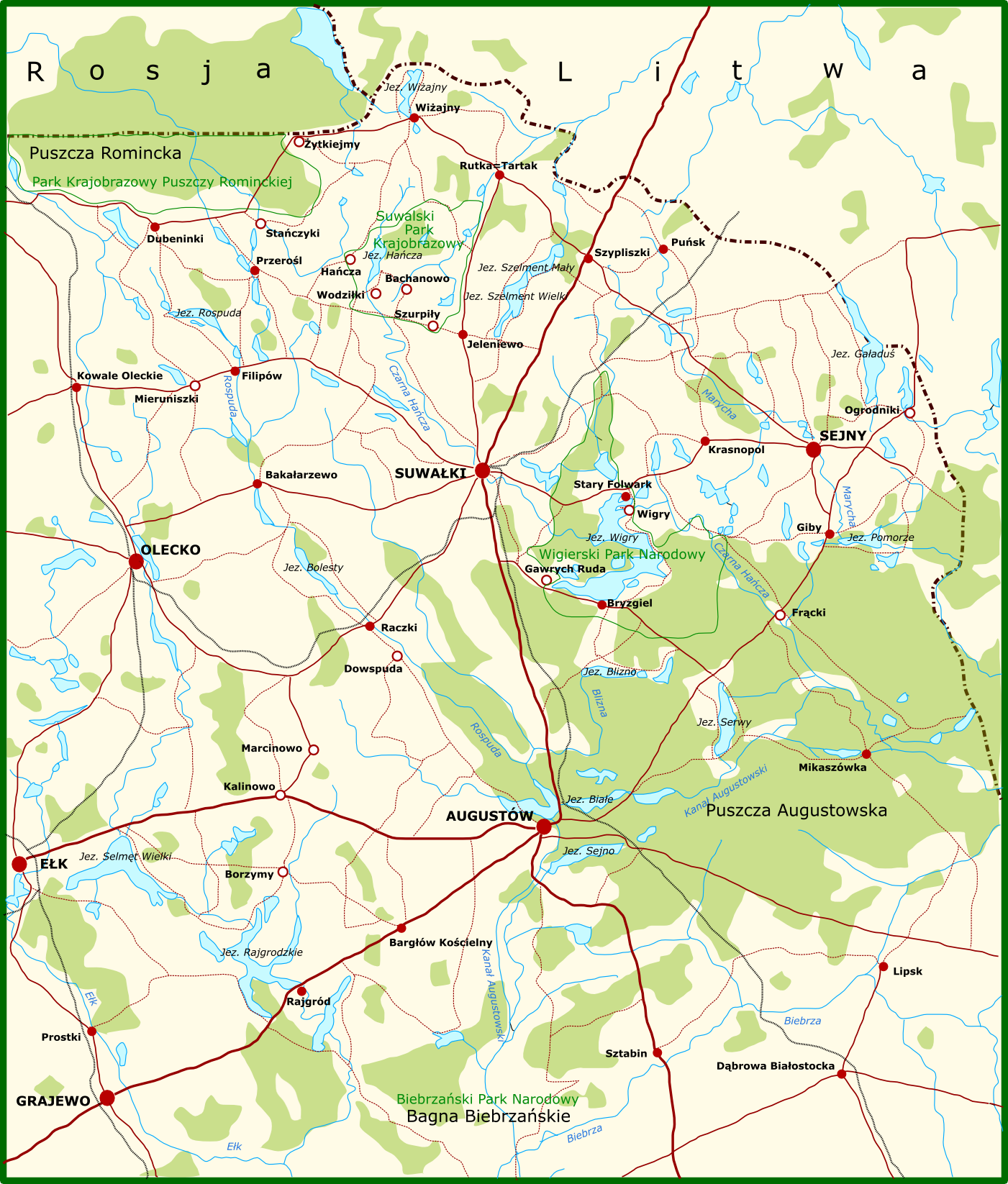
Map of the Suwałki Region. Its many forests and lakes complicated the military actions.

The Russians suffered a great defeat in the Battle of Warsaw in mid-August 1920 and started withdrawing. They handed over Vilnius to the Lithuanians on August 26. The Lithuanians hastily made preparations to secure the border, as determined by the Soviet–Lithuanian Peace Treaty. The soldiers were ordered to maintain neutrality: avoid hostilities and intern any Soviet or Polish troops that would cross the border. On August 26, a Polish delegation, led by Colonel Mieczysław Mackiewicz, arrived in Kaunas to negotiate the situation. The Poles, lacking authority to discuss political issues, were concerned with military aspects. They sought permission to transport Polish troops through the territory of Lithuania, wanted access to a portion of the Saint Petersburg–Warsaw railway, and demanded that the Lithuanian troops would withdraw from the Suwałki Region behind the Curzon Line. The Lithuanians refused to discuss military matters without a clear political Polish–Lithuanian border, that would be respected after the war. Due to these fundamental disagreements and Polish attacks, the negotiations broke down on August 30.

The Suwałki Region had strategic importance in the Polish–Soviet War. Following orders of Edward Rydz-Śmigły, Polish forces took Augustów from Lithuanians in a surprise attack on August 28. Confused and disoriented, Lithuanians retreated from Suwałki and Sejny on August 30 and 31. The Lithuanians reorganized, gathered their forces (11 battalions with 7,000 soldiers), and organized a counterattack to retake lost territory on September 2. The goal was to take and secure the Augustów–Lipsk–Grabowo–Grodno line. The Lithuanians succeeded in re-taking Sejny and Lipsk and by September 4 reached the outskirts of Augustów. On September 5, the Poles counterattacked and forced the Lithuanians to retreat. On September 9, the Polish forces recaptured Sejny, but the Lithuanians pushed back and regained Sejny and Giby on September 13 and 14. Pending direct negotiations, hostilities were ceased on both sides.

=== Direct negotiations and League of Nations ===
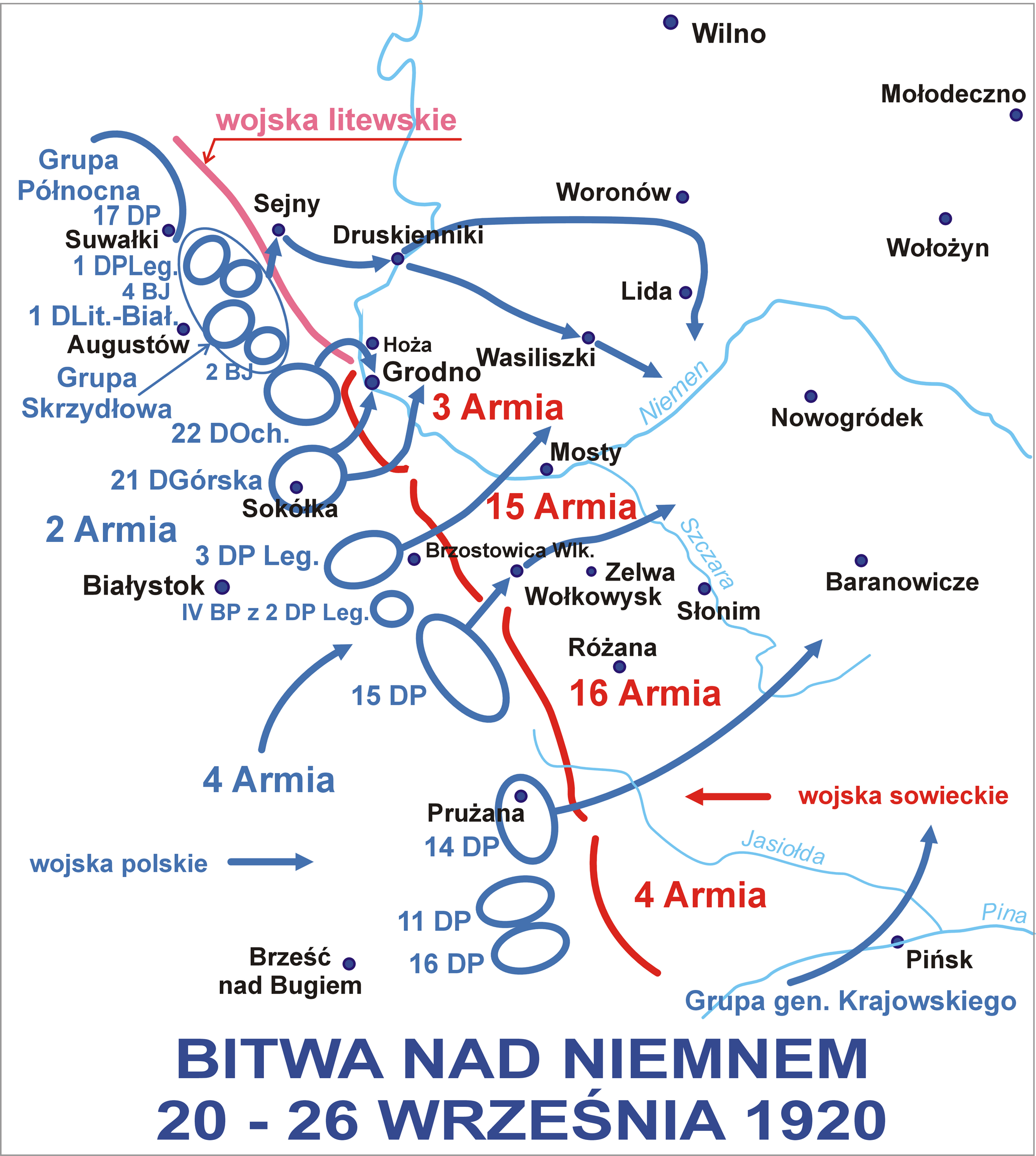
Map of the Battle of the Niemen River: Polish forces manoeuvred through the Lithuanian front line (in pink) to the rear of Soviet troops

On September 6, Lithuanian Foreign Minister Juozas Purickis proposed direct negotiations in Marijampolė. On September 8, during a planning meeting of the Battle of the Niemen River, the Poles decided to manoeuvre through the Lithuanian-held territory to the rear of the Soviet Army, stationed in Grodno. In an attempt to conceal the planned attack, Polish diplomats accepted the proposal to negotiate. The negotiations started on September 16 in Kalvarija, but collapsed just two days later.

On September 5, 1920, Polish Foreign Minister Eustachy Sapieha delivered a diplomatic note to the League of Nations alleging that Lithuania violated its neutrality and asked to intervene in the Polish–Lithuanian War. The League agreed to mediate and began its session on September 16. The resolution, adopted on September 20, urged both states to cease hostilities and adhere to the Curzon Line. Poland was asked to respect Lithuanian neutrality if Soviet Russia agreed to do the same. Also, a special Control Commission was to be dispatched to the conflict zone to oversee the implementation of the resolution. It was clear that the League had only a narrow goal to prevent armed hostilities and not to resolve the underlying territorial dispute. The Lithuanian government accepted the resolution, but Poland reserved full freedom of action in preparation for the attack on the Soviets.

=== Battle of the Niemen River ===
On September 22, 1920, Poland attacked Lithuanian units in the Suwałki Region on a wide front. Overwhelmed by 4–5 times larger Polish forces, some 1,700–2,000 Lithuanian troops surrendered and were taken prisoner.

Polish forces then marched, as planned on September 8, across the Neman River near Druskininkai and Merkinė to the rear of the Soviet forces near Grodno and Lida. The Red Army hastily retreated. The Lithuanians had had limited intelligence warning that such an attack might occur, but chose an inadequate defensive strategy and spread their forces too thinly along the entire Polish–Lithuanian front without sufficient forces to protect the bridges across the Neman. This attack, just two days after the resolution by the League of Nations to cease hostilities, put more pressure on Poland to settle the dispute peacefully.

On September 26, the Poles captured Grodno and the Polish foreign minister proposed new negotiations in Suwałki. The Battle of the Niemen River drastically altered the balance of power: Vilnius, in Lithuanian hands since August 26, was now exposed to a Polish attack. Indeed, the Poles had already decided to capture the city and used the negotiations in Suwałki to stall and buy the time necessary to make preparations. The Lithuanian side was ready to give up the Suwałki Region in exchange for Poland's recognition of the Lithuanian claims to Vilnius.

=== Suwałki Agreement ===
Selected demarcation lines between Poland and Lithuania. The line drawn by the Suwałki Agreement is in yellow; the final interwar border is in red.

The negotiations between Poles, led by colonel Mieczysław Mackiewicz, and Lithuanians, led by general Maksimas Katche, began on the evening of September 29, 1920. Both sides agreed to an armistice but only to the west of the Neman River (the Suwałki Region). Fighting to the east of the river continued around Marcinkonys, Zervynos, Perloja, Eišiškės. The major point of contention, both diplomatic and military, was the train station in Varėna (Orany) on the Saint Petersburg–Warsaw railway. Major Lithuanian forces were still concentrated in the Suwałki Region and moving them to protect Vilnius without the railway would be extremely difficult. Fighting east of the Neman River ceased only on October 6, when Polish troops had already captured the train station in Varėna.

Negotiations regarding the demarcation line were difficult. In essence, the Lithuanians wanted a longer demarcation line to provide better protection for Vilnius. The Poles agreed only to a short line to provide the planned attack on Vilnius with space for operation. The Polish delegation was also stalling to buy time for necessary preparations for an attack on Vilnius. While Vilnius was not a topic of debate, it was on everybody's mind. On October 4, the Control Commission, sent by the League according to its resolution of September 20, arrived to Suwałki. The commission, led by French colonel Pierre Chardigny, re-energized the negotiations. On October 7, at midnight, the final agreement was signed. The treaty made not a single reference to Vilnius or the Vilnius Region. The ceasefire was effective only along the demarcation line, which ran through the Suwałki Region to the train station in Bastuny. Thus the line was incomplete, did not protect the Vilnius Region, but indicated it would be left on the Lithuanian side.

== October–November 1920: struggles for Vilnius Region ==
=== Żeligowski's Mutiny ===
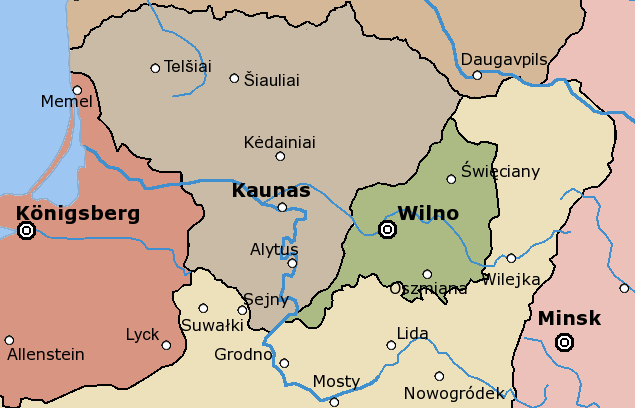
Map of the Republic of Central Lithuania (in green)

Polish chief of state Józef Piłsudski ordered his subordinate, General Lucjan Żeligowski, to stage a mutiny with his 1st Lithuanian–Belarusian Division (16 battalions with 14,000 soldiers) in Lida and capture Vilnius in fait accompli. The rebellion had two main goals: capture Vilnius and preserve Poland's international reputation. The League of Nations was mediating other Polish disputes, notably over the Free City of Danzig and Upper Silesia, and direct aggression against Lithuania could have hampered Polish bargaining positions. While the Polish side officially held Żeligowski to be a deserter and did not support him, Poland provided logistic support, including munitions and food rations, to his units. Żeligowski also received reinforcements, when, according to the official version, the mutiny spread further among the Polish troops. His initial attack was secured on both sides by two Polish Armies.

Żeligowski's Mutiny, in planning since mid-September, began in the early morning of October 8, 1920, just a few hours after the signing of the Suwałki Agreement. A provisional agreement was made in the Polish–Soviet War, which freed up Polish units for the attack on Lithuania. As part of the ruse, Żeligowski wrote a note to the Polish command announcing his mutiny and expressing his disappointment with the Suwałki Agreement. He claimed that his troops marched to defend the right of self-determination of the local Polish population.

=== Capture of Vilnius and other military attacks ===
The Lithuanians were not prepared for the assault. They had only two battalions, stationed near Jašiūnai and Rūdninkai along the Merkys River, shielding the city from Poland. Their main forces were still in the Suwałki Region and to the west from Druskininkai and Varėna. Without the railway, Lithuanian units could not be easily redeployed to protect Vilnius. After it became clear that Żeligowski would not stop in Vilnius, Commander of the Lithuanian Army Silvestras Žukauskas, who had recently taken the position on October 6, ordered the city evacuated in the afternoon on October 8. They left the city's administration to Entente official Constantin Reboul. The first Polish units entered the city around 2:15 PM on October 9, Żeligowski entered Vilnius in the evening the same day. (Note: "On 9 October 1920 Żeligowski marched about 15,000 troops into Wilno. The Lithuanian army offered no resistance, and the city’s Polish population welcomed the troops.") He did not recognize Reboul's authority and Entente officials left the city in protest. On October 12, Żeligowski proclaimed the independence of the Republic of Central Lithuania, with Vilnius as its capital. The name aligned with Piłsudski's vision of historical Lithuania, divided into three cantons: Lithuanian-inhabited Western Lithuania with its capital in Kaunas, Polish-inhabited Central Lithuania with its capital in Vilnius, and Belarusian-inhabited Eastern Lithuania with its capital in Minsk. Further developments of other cantons were prevented by Polish National Democracy, a party opposed to Piłsudski's federalist ideas.

Żeligowski's units continued to advance: territories east of the city were taken without resistance while Lithuanians defended in the west. Żeligowski took Švenčionys and Rūdiškės on October 10, Nemenčinė on October 11, Lentvaris on October 13, Rykantai on October 15. The front somewhat stabilized on the southern (left) side of the Neris River, but fighting continued on the northern (right) side of Neris. On October 18, the Lithuanian army began a failed counteroffensive trying to retake Vilnius. When Polish cavalry manoeuvred towards Riešė, it learned from the local population the location of the command of the 1st Riflemen Division. On October 21, the cavalry raided the village and took the entire command (including Stasys Nastopka) prisoner. Left without their commanders, the Lithuanians retreated and Poles took Maišiagala and Paberžė. Żeligowski at this point offered peace negotiations but was refused by the Lithuanian command. On October 26, another cavalry raid captured Dubingiai, Giedraičiai and Želva and threatened Ukmergė. However, Lithuanians counterattacked and took back Želva on October 30 and Giedraičiai on November 1. For a while, the front stabilized.

On November 17, the mutineers began a major attack. They planned to capture Kaunas, thus threatening Lithuanian independence, by encircling the city from the north through Širvintos–Ukmergė–Jonava and Giedraičiai–Kavarskas–Kėdainiai. Żeligowski's forces were about three times larger: 15 Polish battalions against 5 Lithuanian battalions. One cavalry brigade managed to break through the Lithuanian defence lines near Dubingiai, reached Kavarskas, and continued towards Kėdainiai. However, Lithuanians successfully stopped an attack on Ukmergė near Širvintos on November 19. About 200 Lithuanians manoeuvred through swamps to the rear of three Polish battalions. Attacked from the front and rear, some 200 Poles were taken prisoner while others retreated. The Lithuanians continued to attack and captured Giedraičiai on November 21. On the same day, a ceasefire was signed under pressure from the League of Nations. The Polish cavalry brigade, pushed from Kėdainiai and cut off from its main forces, retreated through Ramygala–Troškūnai–Andrioniškis–Leliūnai and rejoined Żeligowski's other units only on November 24.

=== Mediation and diplomatic measures ===
On October 11, 1920, the Lithuanian envoy in Paris, Oscar Milosz, asked the League of Nations to intervene in the renewed conflict with Poland. On October 14, the Chairman of the League, Léon Bourgeois, issued a note condemning the aggression and asking Polish units to retreat. Politicians in London even considered expelling Poland from the League. When the League heard both arguments on October 26–28, Polish envoy Szymon Askenazy claimed that there was no conflict between Poland and Lithuania to mediate. He maintained that the old conflict had ended with the signing of ceasefires with Lithuania on October 7 and with Soviet Russia on October 12, and the new conflict was caused by Żeligowski, who acted without approval from the Polish command, but with the moral support of the entire Polish nation. Lithuanian envoy Augustinas Voldemaras argued that Poland orchestrated the mutiny, and demanded strict sanctions against Poland. The League refused to validate Żeligowski's action. It suggested to hold a plebiscite in the contested areas. On November 6 and 7, both sides agreed and Lithuanians began preparatory work.

On November 19, Żeligowski proposed to the Control Commission, led by Chardigny, to cease hostilities. Lithuanians agreed and a ceasefire was signed on November 21. Later this episode was criticized by Lithuanian commentators as at the time the Lithuanian Army had the initiative in the front and had a chance of marching on Vilnius. However, the Lithuanians trusted the League of Nations would resolve the dispute in their favour and were afraid that in case of an attack on Vilnius regular Polish forces would arrive to reinforce Żeligowski's units.

Negotiations for a more permanent armistice, under the mediation of the Control Commission, began on November 27 in Kaunas. Lithuania did not agree to negotiate directly with Żeligowski and thus legitimizing his actions. Therefore, Poland stepped in as a mediator. Lithuania agreed as it hoped to put the talks back into the context of the Suwałki Agreement. Poles rejected any withdrawal of Żeligowski's forces. No agreement could be reached regarding a demarcation line. On November 29, 1920, it was agreed only to cease hostilities on November 30, to entrust the Control Commission with the establishment of a 6 km (3.7 mi) wide neutral zone and to exchange prisoners. The neutral zone existed until February 1923.

== Aftermath ==
Article in Karys titled "Hey, world! We will not rest without Vilnius!", 1926

The result of this war was that while Lithuania defended its independence against Poland and its puppet state Central Lithuania, Lithuania also lost a third of its territory and its capital. The issue would not be laid to rest during the interwar as no peace treaty was ever signed, and Lithuania–Poland relations were broken off until the 1938 Polish ultimatum to Lithuania. In 1920–1939, Lithuania and Poland were separated by a demarcation line that mostly followed the Foch Line, which meant that Vilnius and Suwałki region were under Polish rule.

In March 1921, the plans for a plebiscite were abandoned. Neither Lithuania, which was afraid of a negative result nor Poland, which saw no reason to change status quo, wanted the plebiscite. The parties could not agree on which territory to carry out the vote and how Żeligowski's forces should be replaced by League's forces. The League of Nations then moved on from trying to solve the narrow territorial dispute in the Vilnius Region to shaping the fundamental relationship between Poland and Lithuania. In 1921, Belgian Paul Hymans suggested several Polish–Lithuanian federation models, all rejected by both sides. In January 1922, parliamentary election to the Wilno Diet (Sejm wileński) resulted in a landslide Polish victory. In its first session on February 20, 1922, the Diet voted for incorporation into Poland as the Wilno Land and then Voivodeship. Polish Sejm accepted the resolution of the Diet. The League of Nations ended its efforts to mediate the dispute. After Lithuanians seized the Klaipėda Region in January 1923, the League saw recognition of Lithuanian interest in Klaipėda as adequate compensation for the loss of Vilnius. The League accepted the status quo in February 1923 by dividing the neutral zone and setting a demarcation line, which was recognised in March 1923 as the official Polish–Lithuanian border. Lithuania did not recognize this border.

Some historians, notably Alfred E. Senn, have asserted that if Poland had not prevailed in the Polish–Soviet War, Lithuania would have been invaded by the Soviets and would never have experienced two decades of independence. Despite the Soviet–Lithuanian Peace Treaty of 1920, Lithuania was very close to being invaded by the Soviets in the summer of 1920 and being forcibly incorporated into that state, and only the Polish victory derailed that plan.

The dispute over Vilnius remained one of the biggest foreign policy issues in Lithuania and Poland. Lithuania broke off all diplomatic relations with Poland and refused any actions that would recognize Poland's control of Vilnius even de facto. For example, Lithuania broke off diplomatic relations with the Holy See after the Concordat of 1925 established an ecclesiastical province in Wilno and thereby acknowledged Poland's claims to the city. Poland refused to formally recognize the existence of any dispute regarding the region since that would have lent legitimacy to the Lithuanian claims. Railroad traffic and telegraph lines could not cross the border, and mail service was complicated. For example, a letter from Poland to Lithuania needed to be sent to a neutral country and repackaged in a new envelope to remove any Polish signs and only then could be delivered to Lithuania. Despite several attempts to normalize the relations, the situation of "no war, no peace", lasted until Poland demanded to re-establish diplomatic relations by issuing the ultimatum of 1938. These tensions were one of the reasons that Józef Piłsudski's Międzymorze federation was never formed. The Soviets gave Vilnius to Lithuania after the Soviet invasion of Poland in September 1939.

== Bibliography ==
- Ališauskas, Kazys (1968). "Lietuvos kariuomenė (1918–1944)". Lietuvių enciklopedija (in Lithuanian). Vol. XV. Boston, Massachusetts: Lietuvių enciklopedijos leidykla. OCLC 14547758.
- Balkelis, Tomas (2018). Gerwarth, Robert (ed.). War, revolution, and nation-making in Lithuania, 1914-1923. Oxford University Press. ISBN 9780199668021. OCLC 1039838658.
- Borzęcki, Jerzy (2008). The Soviet–Polish Peace of 1921 and the Creation of Interwar Europe. Yale University Press. ISBN 978-0-300-12121-6.
- Eidintas, Alfonsas; Žalys, Vytautas; Senn, Alfred Erich (1999). Tuskenis, Edvardas (ed.). Lithuania in European Politics: The Years of the First Republic, 1918-1940 (Paperback ed.). New York: St. Martin's Press. ISBN 0-312-22458-3.
- Gerutis, Albertas (1984). "Independent Lithuania". In Gerutis, Albertas (ed.). Lithuania: 700 Years. translated by Algirdas Budreckis (6th ed.). New York: Manyland Books. ISBN 0-87141-028-1. LCCN 75-80057.
- Lane, Thomas A. (2001). Lithuania: Stepping Westward. Routledge. ISBN 0-415-26731-5.
- Lesčius, Vytautas (2004). Lietuvos kariuomenė nepriklausomybės kovose 1918–1920 (PDF) (in Lithuanian). Vilnius: Vilnius University, Generolo Jono Žemaičio Lietuvos karo akademija. ISBN 9955-423-23-4.
- Łossowski, Piotr (1966). Stosunki polsko-litewskie w latach 1918–1920 (in Polish). Warsaw: Książka i Wiedza. OCLC 9200888.
- Łossowski, Piotr (1996). Konflikt polsko-litewski 1918 - 1920 (in Polish). Warsaw.
- Rauch, Georg von (1970). The Baltic States: The Years of Independence. University of California Press. ISBN 0-520-02600-4.
- Rudling, Per Anders (22 December 2014). Harris, Jonathan (ed.). The rise and fall of Belarusian nationalism, 1906-1931. Pitt Series in Russian and East European Studies. ISBN 978-0-8229-6308-0. OCLC 909236805.
- Senn, Alfred Erich (1966). The Great Powers: Lithuania and the Vilna Question, 1920–1928. Studies in East European history. Brill Archive. LCCN 67086623.
- Senn, Alfred Erich (1975) [1959]. The Emergence of Modern Lithuania. Greenwood Press. ISBN 0-8371-7780-4.
- Srebrakowski, Aleksander (2001). Konflik polsko-litewski na tle wydarzeń roku 1920 (PDF) (in Polish). Archived from the original (PDF) on 3 March 2019.
- Snyder, Timothy (2003). The Reconstruction of Nations: Poland, Ukraine, Lithuania, Belarus, 1569–1999. Yale University Press. ISBN 0-300-10586-X.
- Vilkelis, Gintaras (2006). Lietuvos ir Lenkijos santykiai Tautų Sąjungoje (in Lithuanian). Versus aureus. ISBN 9955-601-92-2.
- Wyszczelski, Lech (2008). Wilno 1919-1920 (in Polish). Warsaw: Bellona. ISBN 978-83-11-11249-0.
- Budreckis, Algirdas (November 1963). "Lietuvos kariuomenės kūrimasis" (PDF). Karys (in Lithuanian). 9 (1396).
