= Meškučiai =

Meškučiai may refer to several places in Lithuania:

- Meškučiai (Alytus), in Alytus District Municipality
- Meškučiai (Marijampolė)
- Meškučiai (Varėna)
