= Andrius Butkūnas =

Lithuanian military officer

Colonel Andrius Butkūnas
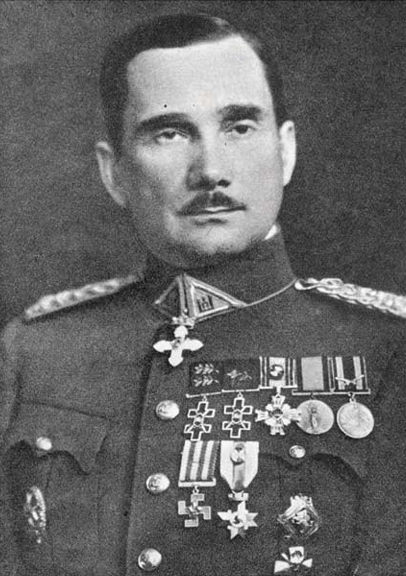

Personal details
- Born: 1 May 1890 Gražioniai, Russian Empire
- Died: 1975 St. Charles, Illinois, United States
- Education: Higher Officers' Courses

Military service
- Allegiance: Russian Empire; Lithuania
- Years of service: 1911–1918 (Russian Imperial Army); 1919–1940 (Lithuanian Army); 1941 (Lithuanian TDA Battalion)
- Rank: Colonel

Andrius Butkūnas (Note: Known as Andrius Butkevičius until 1933.) (1 May 1890 – 1975) was a Lithuanian military officer. As a colonel in independent Lithuania, Butkūnas commanded the 8th Infantry Regiment. During Operation Barbarossa, Butkūnas was the first commander of the Lithuanian TDA Battalion, a formation responsible for the mass murder of Jews in Lithuania and Belarus.

== Biography ==
=== Early life ===
Andrius Butkūnas was born as Andrius Butkevičius on 1 May 1890 in the village of Gražioniai. Butkūnas studied at the Liepāja Gymnasium. After being conscripted into the Imperial Russian Army in 1911, Butkūnas served as a hussar in the imperial guard. At the beginning of the First World War, Butkūnas fought in the regions of East Prussia and Lithuania. In 1916, Butkūnas graduated from a praporshchik military school in Zhytomyr, after which he fought on the Eastern Front. He returned to Lithuania in 1918.

=== Military career in Lithuania ===
Upon returning to Lithuania, Butkūnas was engaged in partisan warfare against the Red Army. On 24 March 1919, Butkūnas was mobilized into the newly formed Lithuanian army. He was made the commander of the 7th company of the 2nd Infantry Regiment. Butkūnas and his regiment participated in the Lithuanian Wars of Independence against the Red Army, Polish Army, and Bermontians. On 3 September 1920, Butkūnas was promoted to senior lieutenant, later distinguishing himself in battle against the Polish forces at the Battle of Giedraičiai. He was made head of the regiment's training company in January 1921. On 15 October 1923, Butkūnas graduated from the Higher Officers' Courses in Kaunas. On 1 August 1925, Butkūnas was made the commander of his regiment's battalion. On 10 September 1929, Butkūnas was transferred to the 4th Infantry Regiment and made an assistant to the regiment's commander. He later became the commander of the regiment's 1st battalion. On 23 November 1930, Butkūnas was made a lieutenant colonel. Butkūnas finished Higher Officers' Courses for a second time on 29 August 1931. He was made the commander of the school's battalion 19 April 1932. On 23 November 1932 Butkūnas was promoted to colonel. On 4 August 1934, Butkūnas was made the commander of the 8th Infantry Regiment.

=== TDA battalion commander ===
After the Soviet occupation of Lithuania in 1940, Butkūnas was relieved from his duties on 27 June. During the beginning of Operation Barbarossa, Butkūnas organized rebels in Raudondvaris who arrested 68 Red Army soldiers. Butkūnas also participated in the June Uprising. After its end, on 27 June 1941, Butkūnas was made the commander of the newly-formed Lithuanian TDA Battalion by his superior, Jurgis Bobelis. Butkūnas signed the first decree of the battalion on 1 July 1941, in which he thanked the leader of "Greater Germany" Adolf Hitler for the liberation from the "Red Terror" and called on the battalion soldiers to follow in the footsteps of the fallen June 1941 rebels and 1919 volunteers and to work selflessly for the "reconstruction of their liberated homeland". Another secret decree stationed guards near important buildings in Kaunas such as the cabinet of ministers, the radio station, and the electricity station. On 3 July, Butkūnas appointed commanders of individual companies of the battalion.

On 24 July 1941, Butkūnas was removed from his position after a coup by the Iron wolf organization and the Gestapo. Butkūnas was subsequently appointed as the director of a brewery in Pilviškiai.

=== Later years ===
In 1944, Butkūnas and his family moved to Germany, where he became the first commandant of a forced labour camp in Geesthacht. He also acted as the chairman of a displaced persons camp in Traunstein. In 1949, he emigrated to the United States, settling in Philadelphia, and later in St. Charles, Illinois. He died in the city in 1975 and was buried in its cemetery.

== Awards ==
Butkūnas was awarded the Order of the Cross of Vytis (fourth and fifth degrees; 1919 and 1920), Order of the Lithuanian Grand Duke Gediminas (fourth degree; 1928), Order of Vytautas the Great (third degree; 1936), Independence Medal, Young Lithuania Union insignia (second degree), and the Latvian War of Independence 10 Year Anniversary Commemorative Medal.

== Family ==
Butkūnas was married to Sofija Singailaitė. They had a daughter named Aldona Zofija, and two sons named Romanas and Andrius Algimantas.
