= Kazys Ališauskas =

Lithuanian military officer (1898–1979)

Lieutenant Colonel Kazys Ališauskas
- Born: 29 March 1898; Meškučiai, Congress Poland, Russian Empire
- Died: 16 January 1979 (aged 80) Chicago, United States
- Allegiance: Lithuania
- Service years: 1919–1940 (Lithuanian Army)
- Rank: Lieutenant Colonel
- Education: War School of Kaunas; Higher Officers' Courses; Vytautas Magnus University
- Spouse: Marija Triponaitė (1912–2005)
- Children: Rimgaudas, Aldona

Kazys Ališauskas (29 March 1898 – 16 January 1979) was a Lithuanian military officer and historian.

== Biography ==
=== Early life military career ===
Kazys Ališauskas was born on 29 March 1898 in the village of Meškučiai in Congress Poland of the Russian Empire. He graduated from the local Marijampolė Gymnasium. When the Lithuanian Wars of Independence broke out, Ališauskas joined the Lithuanian Army as a volunteer in 1919, graduating from the War School of Kaunas on 6 July 1919.

After receiving the rank of karūžas (the lowest officer rank; replaced later by lieutenant), Ališauskas was assigned to the 2nd Infantry Regiment. He fought against the Red Army, Bermontian, and Polish forces. For courage displayed while fighting the Bermontians, he was awarded the Order of the Cross of Vytis, 1st degree. On 3 April 1923 he was promoted to senior lieutenant.

=== First publications ===
The Lithuanian Society for Military Sciences, which was established in 1923, acted as a good intellectual environment for Ališauskas to publish his first historical texts and to chronicle the history of the 2nd Infantry Regiment. He published two reviews outlining the basic facts of the creation of the regiment. In 1928, he published a review on the Battle of Giedraičiai, a battle in which the regiment fought, and which became one of the most commemorated battles in interwar Lithuania. Stasys Raštikis noted that Ališauskas assisted Kazys Ladiga in writing the official history of the Lithuanian Wars of Independence, although the work was not realized in interwar Lithuania.

After completing the Higher Officers' Courses in 1926, Ališauskas was promoted to captain. He also graduated from the Vytautas Magnus University Faculty of Law. In 1933, he graduated from the Higher Officers' Courses signal unit, and a year later graduated from machine gun courses. On 23 November 1934, he was promoted to major. On 23 November 1939, he was promoted to lieutenant colonel.

=== Immigration and career in the United States ===
After the start of the Second World War, Ališauskas stayed in Lithuania. After the Soviet occupation of Lithuania in June 1940, Ališauskas was appointed the commandant of the Raseiniai district, later serving as the officer of special affairs for the General Staff of the Lithuanian Army. On 11 September 1940, Ališauskas began his service in the Red Army's Military School of Vilnius. In 1944 he and his family moved to Germany.

From 1949 they lived in Chicago. Throughout his publishing career, Ališauskas worked full-time at a factory during his stay in the United States. In the United States, Ališauskas was part of the Ramovė group, a Lithuanian veterans' organization established in 1950 in Chicago. Ališauskas had prepared a historical overview of the Soviet occupation of Lithuania, which the Kersten Committee had deemed as a crime committed by the Soviet Union in the context of international law in 1953. Ališauskas's overview became the basis for a similar type of document prepared by the committee. As an émigré, Ališauskas worked on the Lithuanian Boston Encyclopedia's warfare chapter and wrote a book about the Lithuanian Wars of Independence, the latter being commissioned by Ramovė to be done by 1968 by a group of veteran officers. However, internal disagreements and deaths within the group prevented any significant progress on the book, with Ališauskas being the only one who completed a part of the planned book earlier than the deadline and who focused on other fronts while other officers focused exclusively on battles with the Polish. Ališauskas published the book without permission from Ramovė, which got him into conflict with the group that was later resolved. In 1959 Ališauskas received an award as the best author of the magazine Karys. From 1959 to 1972, Ališauskas wrote numerous articles about Lithuanian engagements with the Bermontians, Poles and Bolsheviks. In 1971, he also published an article on the Lithuania National Battalion in Siberia in 1917.

Ališauskas died on 16 January 1979 in Chicago.

== Awards ==
Ališauskas received the following awards:

- Order of the Cross of Vytis, 1st degree (1920)
- Order of the Grand Duke Gediminas, 4th degree (1928)
- Medal of Lithuanian Independence (1928)
- Latvian War of Independence 10 Year Anniversary Commemorative Medal (1929)

== Bibliography ==
- 2‑as pėstininkų Didžiojo Lietuvos kunigaikščio Algirdo pulkas kautynėse ties Giedraičiais [The 2nd Lithuanian Grand Duke Algirdas Infantry Regiment's Battle Near Giedraičiai], (1928)
- Pirmieji nepriklausomybės kovų žygiai [The First Marches of the Independence Wars], (1939)
- Kovos dėl Lietuvos nepriklausomybės, 1918–1920 [The Lithuanian Wars for Independence, 1918–1920], (Vol I; 1972)
