= 8th Infantry Regiment (Lithuania) =

Former Lithuanian Army formation (1919–40)

8th Infantry Regiment of the Duke of Kaunas Vaidotas
- 8-asis pėstininkų Kauno Kunigaikščio Vaidoto pulkas
- Active: May 12, 1919 – October 26, 1940
- Country: Lithuania
- Branch: Lithuanian Army
- Type: Infantry
- Patron: Duke of Kaunas Vaidotas
- Mottos: Drąsa, ištvermė ir Tėvynės meilė tevadovauja mums

The 8th Infantry Regiment (Lithuanian: 8-asis pėstininkų pulkas), later the 8th Infantry Regiment of the Duke of Kaunas Vaidotas (Lithuanian: 8-asis pėstininkų Kauno Kunigaikščio Vaidoto pulkas) was an infantry regiment that served in the Lithuanian Army during the Interwar period.

== 1919 ==
The regiment was founded on 12 May 1919 as the Ukmergė Infantry Battalion (Lithuanian: Ukmergės pėstininkų batalionas). From August to December 1919, the battalion fought against the Bolshevik Red Army from Salakas to Daugpilis. On December 10, the battalion was reorganized into the 8th Regiment.

== 1920 ==
On 16 February 1920, the regiment was given the name of Vaidotas, the Duke of Kaunas. Soon thereafter, on February 21–23, the regiment quelled the mutiny of the Kaunas garrison. Thereafter, the regiment guarded the demarcation line with Poland. In July and August 1920, two of the 8th regiment's battalions guarded the demarcation line to the south of Trakai against Red Army units during the Polish–Soviet War. From 2 to 23 September 1920, the regiment fought against the Polish Army in the Battle of Suwałki. Then, during Żeligowski's Mutiny, the regiment fought in the Battle of Giedraičiai.

== Klaipėda Revolt ==
In 1923, the regiment's soldiers partook in the Klaipėda Revolt. The company, led by Lieutenant Viktoras Burokevičius, broke through the entire city to the French Commissioner's prefecture, where the company commander was killed. However, the prefecture was occupied and the French surrendered.

== Interwar ==
In 1921, after the battles against the Poles ceased, the regiment was stationed in Šėta, and then moved to the permanent dislocation in Šiauliai. On 29 July 1929, the regiment was given the flag with the inscription of "Drąsa, ištvermė ir Tėvynės meilė tevadovauja mums" (May Bravery, Endurance and Love of the Fatherland lead us).

The regiment was part of the 3rd Infantry Division. The regiment had two battalions, totalling about 1,100 soldiers. The regiment's commander was also the commander of the Šiauliai garrison.

== Soviet occupation and disbandment ==
The 5th Infantry Regiment of the Lithuanian Grand Duke Kęstutis was renamed to 5th Infantry Regiment on 25 July 1940, following Lithuania's occupation by the Soviet Union. Finally, the regiment was disbanded on October 27.

== Regimental commanders ==
- 1919 – officer Julius Čaplikas
- 1921 – Colonel Petras Jurgaitis
- 1921 – Colonel Albertas Liutermoza
- 1924 – Colonel Aleksandras Šumskis
- 1926 – Colonel Jurgis Bobelis
- 1927 – Colonel Pranas Tvaronas
- 1934–1940 – Colonel Andrius Butkūnas-Butkevičius

== Sources ==
=== Books ===
- Lesčius, Vytautas (2004). Lietuvos Kariuomenė Nepriklausomybės Kovose 1918–1920 (PDF) (in Lithuanian). Vilnius: Generolo Jono Žemaičio Lietuvos karo akademija. ISBN 9955-423-23-4.
- Surgailis, Gintautas (2022). Aštuntasis pėstininkų Kauno kunigaikščio Vaidoto pulkas (PDF). Lietuvos kariuomenės istorija (in Lithuanian). Vilnius: Generolo Jono Žemaičio Lietuvos karo akademija. ISBN 978-609-8277-30-2.
- Ruzgas, Vincas, ed. (1932). "VIII. Krašto apsauga". Visa Lietuva: Informacinė knyga 1931 m. (in Lithuanian). Kaunas: Spaudos Fondas.
- Bliudnikas, Ernestas; Nazaras, Petras (1934). 8-tas pėstininkų Kauno kunigaikščio Vaidoto pulkas: pulko penkiolikos gyvavimo metų sukakčiai paminėti, 1919–1934 (in Lithuanian). Šiauliai: Viltis.

=== Other ===
- Vydrina, Elena (2008). "lcva fondo 521 pažyma". Lietuvos centrinis valstybės archyvas (in Lithuanian).
