= Meškučiai (Varėna) =

Coordinates: 54°22′44″N 24°30′11″E

- Village
- Interactive map of Meškučiai (Varėna)
- Country: Lithuania
- County: Alytus County
- Municipality: Varėna

Population (2001)
  - Total: 15
- Time zone: UTC+2 (EET)
  - Summer (DST): UTC+3 (EEST)

Meškučiai village, Varėna district.

Meškučiai (Varėna) is a village in Varėna district municipality, in Alytus County, in southeastern Lithuania. According to the 2001 census, the village has a population of 15 people.
