= Battle of Giedraičiai =

Coordinates: 55.087°N 25.254°E

- Part of Polish–Lithuanian War
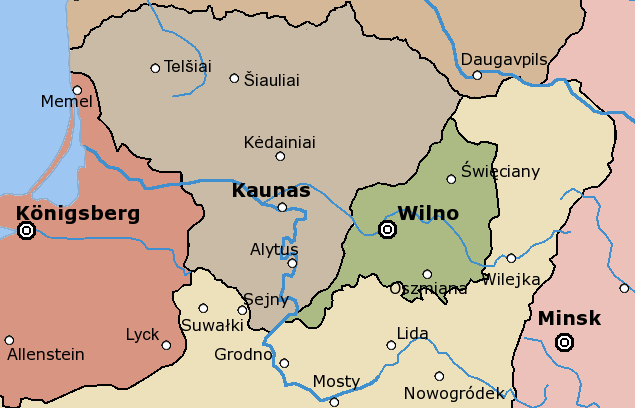
- Borders of Lithuania and Central Lithuania in 1920
| Date | 17–21 November 1920 |
| Location | Giedraičiai, Lithuania |
| Result | Lithuanian victory |

Belligerents
| Poland: Central Lithuania | Lithuania |

Commanders and leaders
| Lucjan Żeligowski | Silvestras Žukauskas; Konstantinas Žukas |

Units involved
| 1st Lithuanian–Belarusian Division: Grodno Regiment | 1st Infantry Division: 2nd Infantry Regiment; 7th Inf. Regt.; 8th Inf. Regt. (after Nov. 19); 9th Inf. Regt. |

Strength
| unknown | unknown |

Casualties and losses
| See #Casualties | See #Casualties |

The Battle of Giedraičiai (Lithuanian: Giedraičių mūšis) was fought on November 17–21, 1920, between the Lithuanian Army and a part of the Polish Army led by Lucjan Żeligowski, which called itself the Army of Central Lithuania.

== Battle ==
=== November 17: Polish offensive begins ===
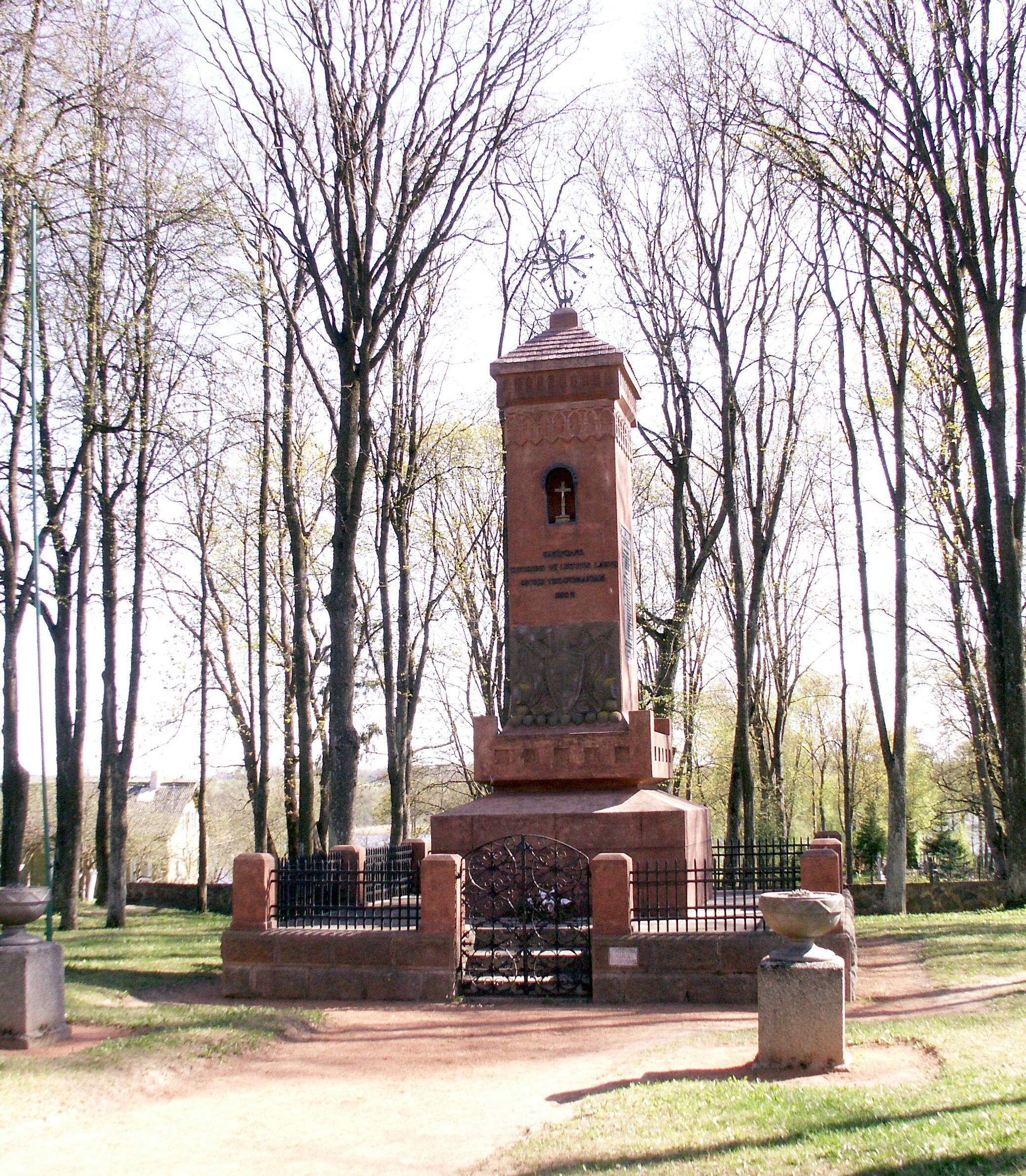
Monument to Lithuanian soldiers at Giedraičiai

== Casualties ==
=== Polish casualties ===
The fighting destroyed a smashed armored car, 2 machine guns, about 20,000 rifle cartridges, and several artillery shell carriages. 60 prisoners of war were taken, with Polish stragglers that evaded capture being left behind. In the vicinity of Giedraičiai, at least 30 Polish dead were counted, with an unknown amount unidentified. The count of wounded is unknown, but 11 seriously wounded soldiers were captured by Lithuanians.

=== Lithuanian casualties ===
Concerning Lithuanian soldiers, 15 were killed, about 60 wounded and about 70 were missing in action. Three officers were killed and four were wounded.

== Aftermath ==
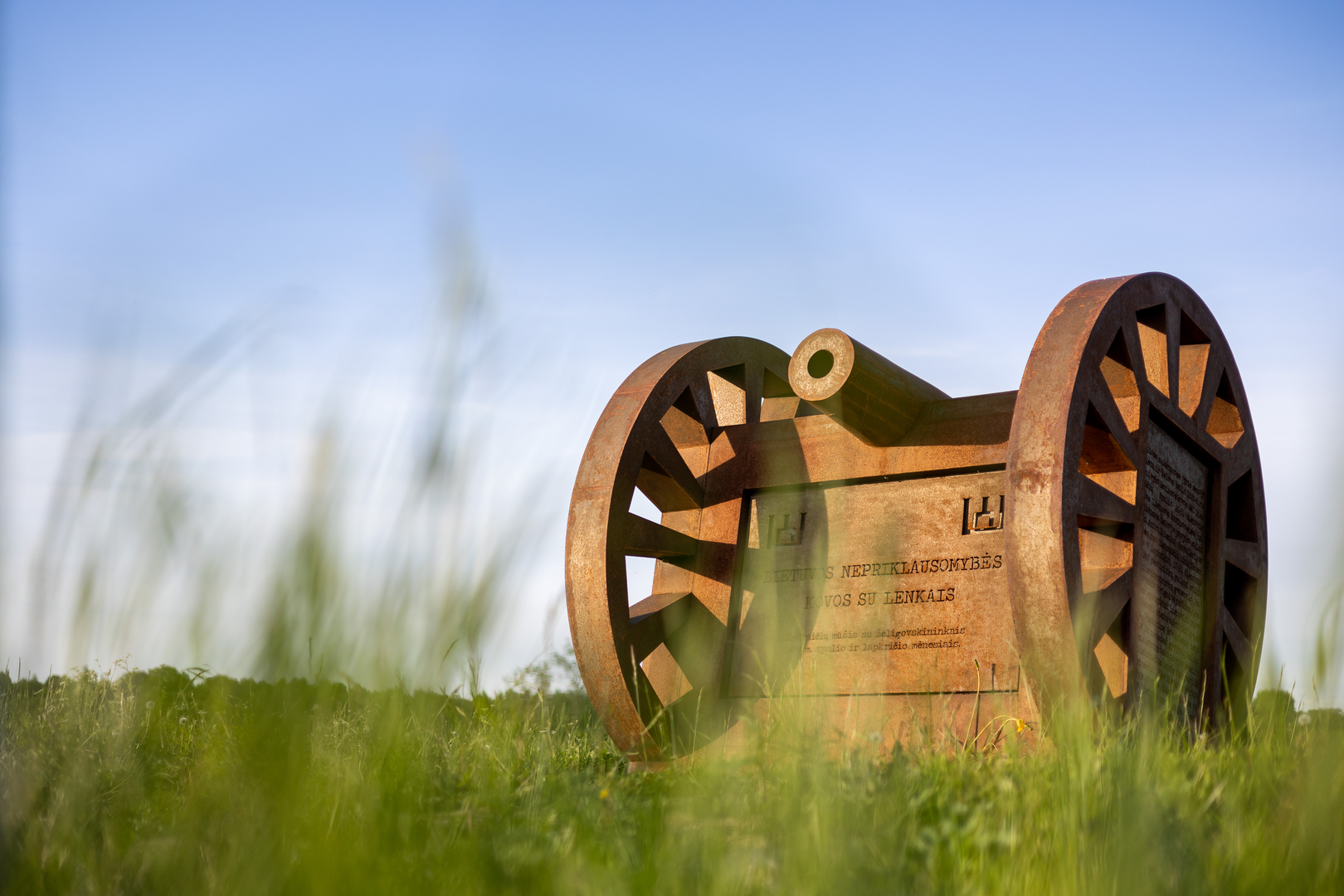
Giedraičiai cannon

== Commemoration ==
The site of the battle of Giedraičiai is marked and commemorated by a symbolic cannon.

== Sources ==
- Ališauskas, Kazys (1958). "Lietuvos kariuomenė (1918–1944)". Lietuvių enciklopedija (in Lithuanian). Vol. XV. Boston, Massachusetts: Lietuvių enciklopedijos leidykla.
- Lesčius, Vytautas (2004). Lietuvos kariuomenė nepriklausomybės kovose 1918–1920 (PDF) (in Lithuanian). Vilnius: Generolo Jono Žemaičio Lietuvos karo akademija. ISBN 9955-423-23-4. Archived from the original (PDF) on 2015-01-02.
- Iršėnas, Marius (2015). The Lithuanian Millennium: History, Art and Culture. Vilnius, Lithuania: Vilnius Academy of Arts Press. ISBN 9786094470974.
- Jankauskas, Vidmantas (2004). "Giedraičių mūšis". Visuotinė lietuvių enciklopedija (in Lithuanian). Vol. VI (Fau-Goris). Vilnius: Mokslo ir enciklopedijų leidybos institutas.
- Kiaupa, Zigmantas (2005). The History of Lithuania. Vilnius.
