= Piotr Łossowski =

Polish historian and academic (1925–2025)

Piotr Henryk Łossowski (25 February 1925 – 26 July 2025) was a Polish historian and academic. Lecturer at Collegium Civitas. Member of the Historical Committee of the Polish Academy of Sciences. He specialized in the areas of foreign politics and diplomacy and history of the Second Polish Republic, military history of Poland in the years 1918–1920, history of the Baltic states and their relations with Poland. He gained major recognition for his works on the state of Polish diplomacy in the time of the Second Republic.

Editor in chief of Studia z Dziejów Rosji i Europy Środkowej-Wschodniej (Studies the History of Russia and East-Central Europe) journal.

Łossowski died on 26 July 2025, at the age of 100.

== Selected publications ==
- Agresja hitlerowska na Polskę (1964)
- Stosunki polsko-litewskie 1918–1920 (1966)
- Żołnierze minionych lat (1969)
- Kraje bałtyckie na drodze od demokracji parlamentarnej do dyktatury (1972)
- Między wojną a pokojem (1976)
- Litwa a sprawy polskie 1939–1949 (1982)
- Po tej i po tamtej stronie Niemna: Stosunki polsko-litewskie 1883–1939 (1985)
- Zerwane pęta: Usunięcie okupantów z ziem polskich w listopadzie 1918 (1986)
- Polska w Europie i świecie (1992)
- Stosunki polsko-estońskie (1992)
- Historia dyplomacji polskiej, t.4 (red.) (1995)
- Konflikt polsko-litewski 1918–1920 (1996)
- Stosunki polsko-litewskie 1921–1939 (1997)
- Jak Feniks z popiołów. Oswobodzenie ziem polskich spod okupacji (1998)
- Litwa / Historia państw świata XX wieku (2001)
- Dyplomacja polska 1918–1939 (2001)
