= Mieczysław Mackiewicz =

Polish general

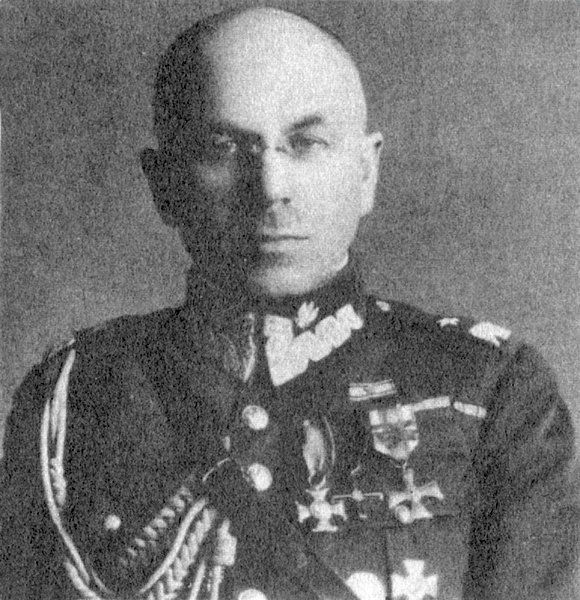
Mieczysław Mackiewicz

Mieczysław Mackiewicz (9 May 1880 – 6 August 1954) was a Polish general.

== Biography ==
In partitioned Poland, Mackiewicz joined the Imperial Russian Army and fought in the Russo-Japanese War (1904–1905), reaching the rank of a captain. In 1913 he secretly joined the Polish pro-independence organization Związek Strzelecki, and worked with Józef Piłsudski. During the First World War, he fought in the Russian Army against the Germans, and was captured in 1915. He formed a Polish school for NCOs in prisoner-of-war camps. In 1918 he joined the Polish Army. He took part in the Polish-Lithuanian negotiations in Suwałki and fought in the Polish-Soviet War, where he commanded infantry divisions and operational groups; He was wounded in 1920, and promoted to general in 1927. He retired in 1935, but joined the Polish Army again during German invasion of Poland in 1939 as a volunteer. Eventually he joined the Polish Armed Forces in the West. After the war he settled in the United Kingdom, where he died in 1954.

He was also a member of the first chapter of the Virtuti Militari Order. By Order No. 11 of May 6, 1922, he was awarded the Cross of Valor for the 2nd, 3rd and 4th time. From January 1921 to May 1926, he commanded the 30th Infantry Division and then, until March 1935, he was the commander of the 26th Infantry Division (in the meantime, on January 1, 1927, he was promoted to the rank of brigadier general). On September 30, 1935, he retired. He settled on the estate of Żydomla near Grodno, which he received for his war services as part of a military settlement.

== Honours and awards ==
- Order of Virtuti Militari
- Order of Polonia Restituta, Officer's Cross
- Cross of Independence
- Medal of Independence
- Cross of Valour – four times
- Gold Cross of Merit
