= Meškučiai, Marijampolė =

Village in Sudovia, Lithuania

Meškučiai
- Village
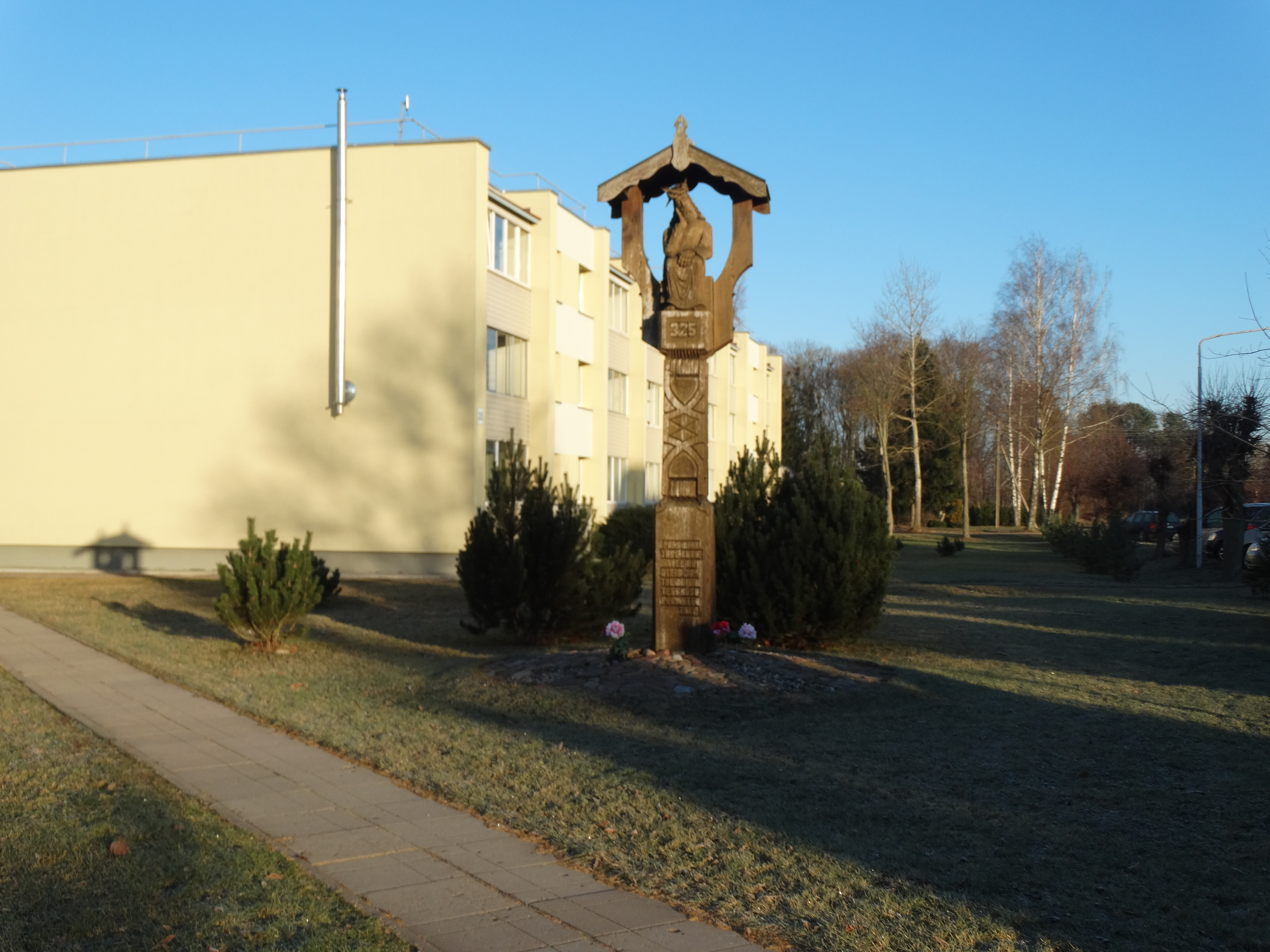
- Column shrine of Meškučiai

- Location in Lithuania
- Coordinates: 54°31′05″N 23°17′49″E
- Country: Lithuania
- Ethnographic region: Suvalkija
- County: Marijampolė County
- Municipality: Marijampolė Municipality
- Eldership: Mokolų eldership
- First mentioned: 1684

Population (2021)
  - Total: 404
- Time zone: UTC+2 (EET)
  - Summer (DST): UTC+3 (EEST)
- Area code: 343

Meškučiai (Lithuanian pronunciation: [mʲɛʃˈkʊt͡ʃʲɛɪ̯ˑ]) is a village in Marijampolė Municipality of southwestern Lithuania, located approximately 5 kilometres (3.1 mi) southwest of Marijampolė city center. Situated near the Šešupė River and the Kazlų Rūda–Alytus railway and the Marijampolė–Alytus road, the village is notable for its archaeological history. According to the 2021 census, the village has 404 residents.

== History ==
Archaeological evidence indicates that the Meškučiai area has been inhabited since 2000 BC. Excavations in 2007 at the nearby Meškučiai hillfort uncovered an ancient Jotvingian settlement, over a thousand artifacts and remains of wooden structures with multiple cultural layers. Although significant portions of the hillfort were eroded by the Šešupė River during the 19th century, making its original size uncertain, those archeological findings established Meškučiai as one of the oldest continuously inhabited sites in the Sudovia region.

The village of Meškučiai is first mentioned in historical sources in 1684. However, the surrounding area of Pašešupys (modern-day Marijampolė) is mentioned as early as 1626 and 1667 in tax records of the Kaunas powiat. A primary school was established in 1912 and a village library in 1956. From 1960 to 1988, Meškučiai served as the centre of a local administrative district (apylinkė) in the Marijampolė region.

A monument to Grand Duke Vytautas the Great was unveiled on 7 July 1935, in the village cemetery. The 4-meter-high monument was initiated and financed entirely by the local residents. Members of the Young Lithuania movement (Jaunalietuviai) conceived the idea in 1932. Over three years, they collected more than 500 litas through community donations. Local craftsman Vincas Ašeriškis forged the iron cross for the monument. It is one of the few Lithuanian patriotic monuments that survived World War II and subsequent demolitions ordered by the occupying Soviet authorities. The monument's survival through the Soviet period is attributed to residents deliberately overgrowing it with vegetation and obscuring its inscription. It underwent restoration in 1998 and again in 2004 to commemorate the village's 320th anniversary. The date "1930" inscribed on it references the 500th anniversary of the death of Grand Duke Vytautas, not the construction date. On the outskirts of Meškučiai, there is also a small memorial to two postwar Lithuanian partisans of the Vytautas military district.

== Notable people ==
- Kazys Ališauskas (1891–1944) - Lieutenant Colonel, military historian.
- Stasys Barzdukas (1908–1995) - Lithuanian linguist, philologist.
- Jonas Čėsna (1891–1966) - Teacher, book smuggler, political and public figure.
- Stanislovas Čėsna (1888–1962) - Priest, publicist, public figure.
- Juozas Vyšniauskas (1881–1949) - Volunteer in the Lithuanian Wars of Independence, chaplain to partisans.

Population census
Year	Pop.	±% p.a.
1888	475	—
1923	379	−0.64%
1959	434	+0.38%
1970	489	+1.09%
1979	510	+0.47%
1986	499	−0.31%
1989	459	−2.75%
2001	507	+0.83%
2011	461	−0.95%
2021	404	−1.31%
Source: Visuotinė lietuvių enciklopedija
