= Alfred E. Senn =

American historian (1932–2016)

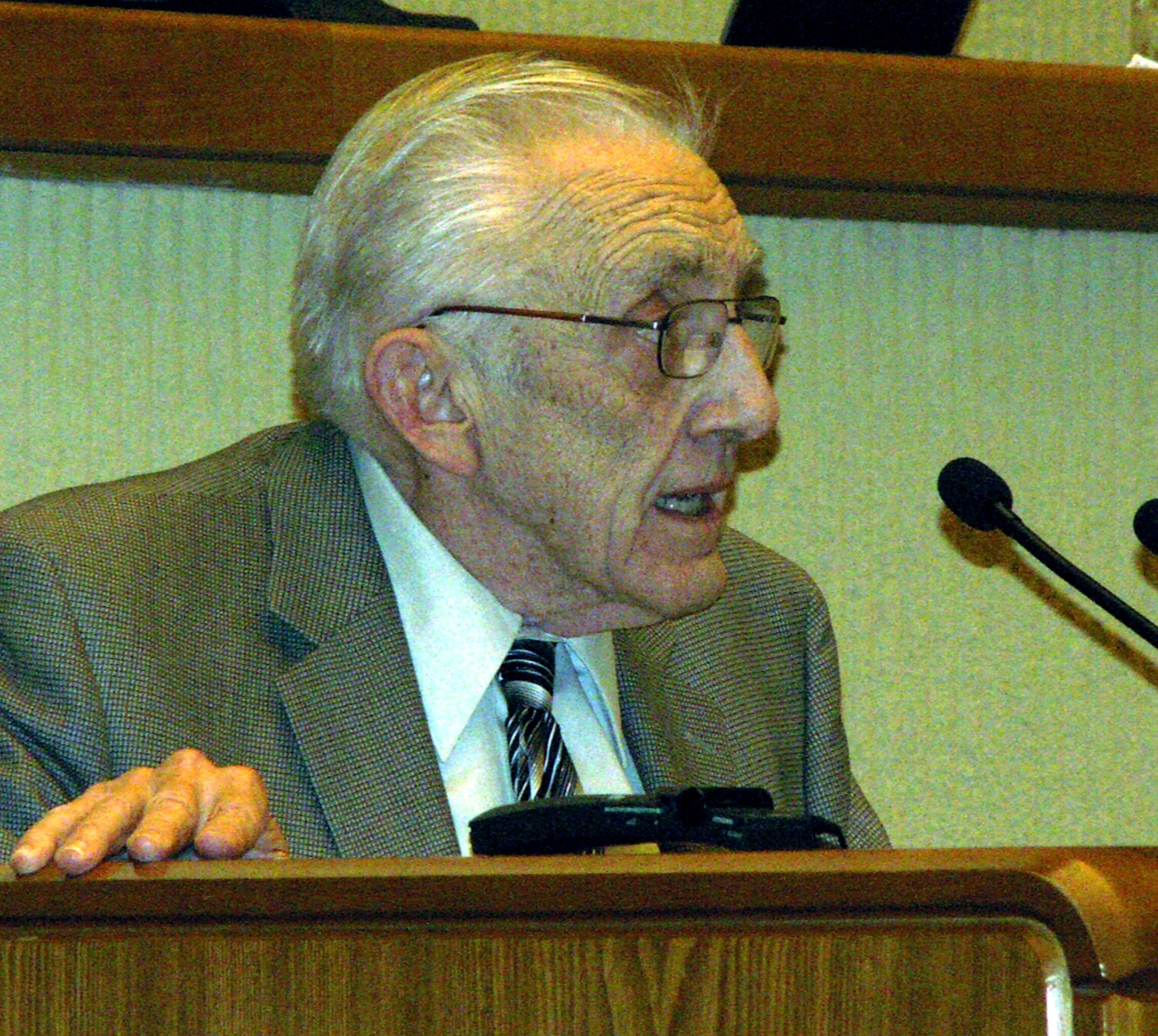
- Born: April 12, 1932; Madison, Wisconsin, U.S.
- Died: March 8, 2016 (aged 83); Madison, Wisconsin, U.S.
- Occupation: Professor of history

Alfred Erich Senn (April 12, 1932 – March 8, 2016) was a professor of history at the University of Wisconsin–Madison.

Senn was born in Madison, Wisconsin, to Swiss philologist and lexicographer, Alfred Senn. His father taught at the University of Lithuania, where he met his future wife. After they married, they moved to the United States in 1930 or 1931, along with two daughters.

Senn received a BA in 1953 from the University of Pennsylvania and then an MA in 1955 and a PhD in 1958 from Columbia University in East European history. He started teaching at the University of Wisconsin–Madison in 1961, and he retired as professor emeritus.

Senn was the author of various books and numerous scholarly articles. Many of his works center on the history of Lithuania. His book Gorbachev's Failure in Lithuania was awarded the Edgar Anderson Presidential Prize by the American Association of Baltic Studies in 1996. He died at his home in Madison on March 8, 2016.

== Works ==
- Lithuania 1940: Revolution from Above. Amsterdam: Ropodi, 2007. ISBN 978-90-420-2225-6
- Power, Politics, and the Olympic Games. Champaign, IL: Human Kinetics, 1999. ISBN 978-0-88011-958-0
- Gorbachev's Failure in Lithuania. New York: St. Martin's Press, 1995. ISBN 978-0-312-12457-1
- Lithuania Awakening. Berkeley: University of California Press, 1990. ISBN 978-0-520-07170-4
- Assassination in Switzerland: The Murder of Vatslav Vorovsky. Madison: University of Wisconsin Press, 1981. ISBN 978-0-299-08550-6
- Jonas Basanavičius, the Patriarch of the Lithuanian National Renaissance. Newtonville, MA: Oriental Research Partners, 1980. ISBN 978-0-89250-251-6
- [Nicholas Rubakin: A Life for Books Nicholas Rubakin: A Life for Books]. Newtonville, MA: Oriental Research Partners, 1977. ISBN 978-0-89250-125-0
- Diplomacy and Revolution: the Soviet Mission to Switzerland, 1918. Notre Dame, IN: University of Notre Dame Press, 1974. ISBN 978-0-268-00541-2
- The Russian Revolution in Switzerland, 1914–1917. Madison: University of Wisconsin Press, 1971. ISBN 978-0-299-05941-5
- The Great Powers, Lithuania and the Vilna Question 1920–1928. Leiden: E.J. Brill, 1966. OCLC 398265
- The Emergence of Modern Lithuania. New York: Columbia University Press, 1959. OCLC 1624803
