= Bronius Norkus =

Bronislovas (Bronius) Norkus
- Bronius Norkus as a student in 1933
- Born: 20 December 1914; Liepāja, Courland Governorate, Russian Empire
- Died: 4 April 1942 (aged 27); Dedovichsky District, Pskov Oblast, Soviet Union
- Cause of death: Fall from a horse
- Military career
- Allegiance: Lithuania; Soviet Union; Nazi Germany
- Branch: Lithuanian Air Force; Lithuanian Auxiliary Police
- Service years: 1938–1940; 1941–1942
- Rank: Lieutenant
- Unit: Lithuanian TDA Battalion
- Commands: 4th Company of 1st Lithuanian Police Batallion

Bronislovas "Bronius" Norkus (20 December 1914 – 4 April 1942) was an officer of the Lithuanian military air force and a company commander within the Lithuanian TDA Battalion established following the Nazi German occupation of Lithuania in June 1941. As part of the Rollkommando Hamann, he participated in the execution of Lithuanian Jews.

== Biography ==
=== Early service ===
Norkus joined the Lithuanian Riflemen's Union in 1934. He graduated from Kaunas War School in May 1938 and was assigned as a junior lieutenant in the Lithuanian Military Aviation. Following the Soviet occupation of Lithuania in 1940, he was incorporated into the aviation squadron of the 29th Territorial Riflemen Corps of the Red Army. He was discharged from the Red Army on 16 December 1940.

=== Lithuanian TDA Battalion ===
When Nazi Germany invaded the Soviet Union in June 1941 and the anti-Soviet June Uprising broke out, Norkus took part in the uprising in Kaunas and later joined the newly formed Lithuanian TDA Battalion. Norkus served as a platoon and later company commander within the TDA battalion, which was subsequently reorganized into security and police battalions (initially designated as the 1st Lithuanian Police Battalion, and later re-designated as the 13th Lithuanian Police Battalion).

From 28 June to 4 September 1941, Norkus was a platoon commander of the 3rd company of the TDA Battalion which formed a core of the Rollkommando Hamann, a mobile killing squad that organized massacres of Jews. Norkus was then promoted to the commander of the 4th company, which according to historian Arūnas Bubnys, did not directly participate in the Holocaust.

Norkus participated in mass executions of the Jewish population in Kaunas (at the Seventh and Ninth Forts) as well as across regional towns in provincial Lithuania, including Babtai, Prienai, Alytus, Butrimonys, Seirijai, Simnas in September 1941, and Lazdijai in November 1941.

=== Death ===
Norkus died from a fall from a horse on 4 April 1942, while serving with the 13th Lithuanian Police Battalion on the Eastern Front in the Pskov region of Russia. He was buried in Kaunas City Old Cemetery and reburied in Seniava Cemetery when the old cemetery was converted into Ramybės Park in 1950s.

== Bibliography ==
- Bubnys, Arūnas (2017). Lietuvių policijos batalionai 1941–1945. Vilnius: Lietuvos gyventojų genocido ir rezistencijos tyrimo centras. ISBN 9786098037685.
- Bubnys, Arūnas (2006). "Lietuvių policijos 1 (13)-asis batalionas ir žydų žudynės 1941 m." Genocidas Ir Rezistencija. 2 (20). ISSN 1392-3463.
- Bubnys, Arūnas (2002). "Holokaustas Lietuvos provincijoje 1941 m.: žydų žudynės Kauno apskrityje". Genocidas Ir Rezistencija. 2 (12). ISSN 1392-3463.
- Bubnys, Arūnas. "Lithuanian Police Battalions and the Holocaust" (PDF). The International Commission for the Evaluation of the Crimes of the Nazi and Soviet Occupation Regimes in Lithuania. pp. 12–13.
- Dieckmann, Christoph; Sužiedėlis, Saulius (2016-06-01). "Lietuvos žydų persekiojimas ir masinės žudynės 1941 metų vasarą: šaltiniai ir analizė" (PDF). komisija.lt. Vilnius.
- Sužiedėlis, Saulius (2025). Crisis, War, and the Holocaust in Lithuania. Newton, MA: United States Holocaust Memorial Museum. doi:10.1515/9798887194912. ISBN 9798887194929.
- Žalienė, Dalia, ed. (2005). Lietuvos kariuomenės karininkai, 1918–1953. Vol. V. Vilnius: Lietuvos nacionalinis muziejus. ISBN 9955415517.
