= Lithuanian partisans (disambiguation) =

Lithuanian partisans were partisans who waged a guerrilla warfare in Lithuania against the Soviet Union in 1944–1953.

Lithuanian partisans may also refer to various irregular military units in different historical periods active in Lithuania against foreign invaders and occupiers:

- Lithuanian guerrilla troops during the Lithuanian–Soviet War
- Lithuanian irregular military troops during the Polish–Lithuanian War
- Lithuanian partisans (1941), a collective name of several unrelated groups
- Irregular military units formed by Lithuanian Jews during World War II; see Jewish partisans § Lithuania
- Soviet partisans acting in Eastern Lithuania during World War II

== See also ==
- Belarusian partisans
- Forest Brothers (organized anti-Soviet resistance in the Baltic states)
- Jewish partisans
- Latvian partisans
- Polish partisans (disambiguation)
- Soviet partisans
