= Lithuanian partisans (1941) =

Lithuanian partisans is a generic term used to describe a broad variety of disconnected groups during World War II in Lithuania, sometimes even on opposing sides.

The Lithuanian resistance units and insurgents that fought in the anti-communist 1941 June Uprising in Lithuania are sometimes called Lithuanian partisans (Lithuanian: lietuvių partizanai). Simultaneously, some sources, including Soviet propaganda, also refer to the Soviet partisans in Lithuania as Lithuanian partisans. Furthermore, paramilitary auxiliaries involved in the Holocaust in Lithuania (which involved mass executions of the Lithuanian Jews during the first months of the German occupation of Lithuania during World War II) were also called Lithuanian partisans, including by Nazi officials such as Karl Jäger in his infamous Jäger Report. Among these, the most known are the Ypatingasis būrys (known for the Ponary massacre), the group of Algirdas Klimaitis (connected to the Kaunas pogrom) and the Lithuanian TDA Battalion (its 3rd Company aided the Rollkommando Hamann).
