= June Uprising in Lithuania =

Pro-independence, anti-Soviet uprising in June 1941

June Uprising
- Part of Operation Barbarossa on the Eastern Front of World War II
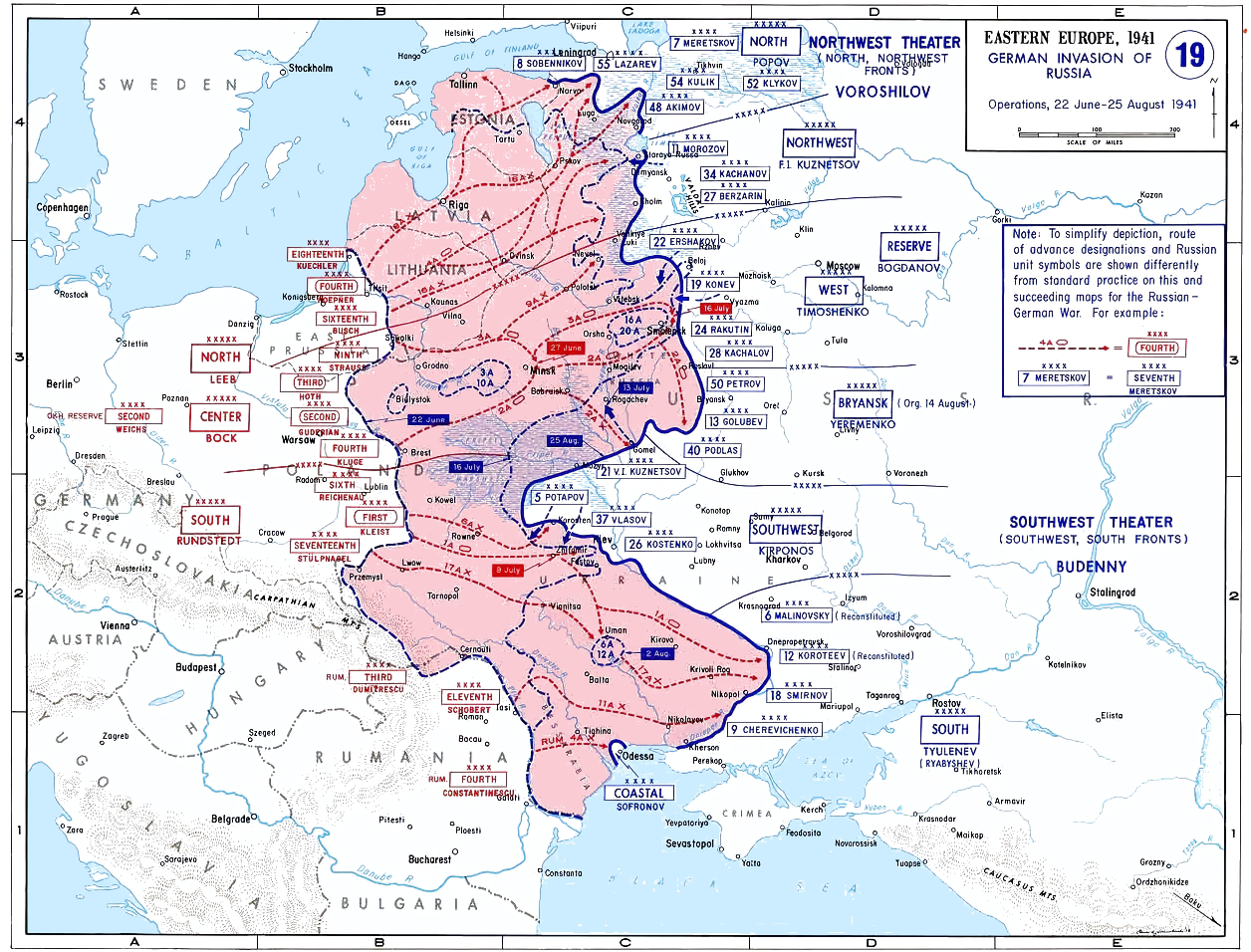
- German advances from June to August 1941
Date	22–27 June 1941 (5 days)
Location	Lithuania
Result	Lithuanian victory: Soviet forces expelled; Provisional Government of Lithuania established; Independence of Lithuania declared; Beginning of the Holocaust in Lithuania

Belligerents
Soviet Union: Red Army; NKVD	Provisional Government of Lithuania: Lithuanian Activist Front

Strength
12–15 divisions (137,605–158,775)	20,000–30,000

Casualties and losses
5,000	600

The June Uprising (Lithuanian: Birželio sukilimas) was a brief period in late June 1941 between the first Soviet and the Nazi occupations.

A year earlier, on June 15, 1940, the Red Army occupied Lithuania and established the unpopular Lithuanian Soviet Socialist Republic, which silenced its critics and suppressed resistance with political repression and state terrorism. When Nazi Germany attacked the Soviet Union on June 22, 1941, the Lithuanian Activist Front initiated the June uprising for which it had been preparing since late 1940 and formed the short-lived provisional government. The Lithuanian insurgents liberated Kaunas and Vilnius before the Wehrmacht arrived and within a week, all of the Lithuanian territory was free from the occupying Red Army.

The June uprising was directed militarily against the Soviets but politically against the Germans, who were against the declaration of Lithuanian independence, and the establishment of the Provisional Government of Lithuania and various Lithuanian self-rule institutions. The German Army was greeted by anti-communist Lithuanians as liberators from repressive Soviet rule, because of the widespread hopes that Germany would help to recreate Lithuanian independence. For many Lithuanians, even a somewhat autonomous status, akin to the Slovak Republic, was appealing compared to the Soviet occupation. This was not granted by the German occupiers, who steadily replaced Lithuanian institutions with their own and established the Reichskommissariat Ostland on July 17, 1941. Deprived of any real power, the provisional government disbanded itself on August 5. Lithuanians were quickly disillusioned with German obstruction to their independence and their subsequent anti-Nazi resistance was passive, in order to not aid Soviet victory and save up Lithuanian military power to resist a future Soviet re-occupation.

== Background and preparations ==
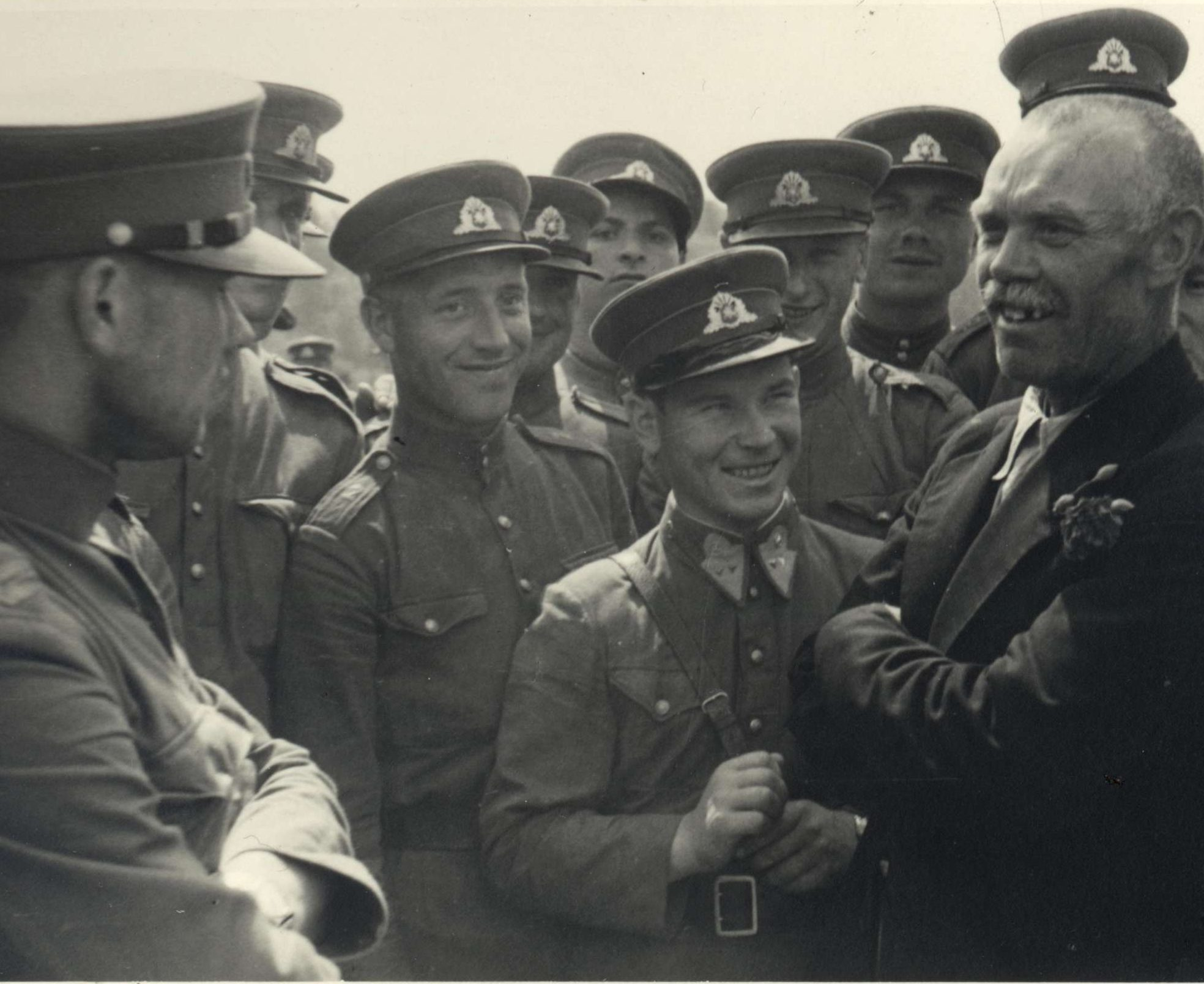
Soviet political leader (without military shoulder straps) and the puppet People's Seimas member (with red rose in his jacket lapel) announces to the Lithuanian People's Army non-commissioned officers that "soon you will become members of the Red Army" in Kaunas, 1940

In 1918, Lithuania achieved independence in the aftermath of World War I and the Russian Revolution and secured its statehood during the Lithuanian Wars of Independence. Initially, prior to World War II, Lithuania declared neutrality, and its Seimas passed the neutrality laws.

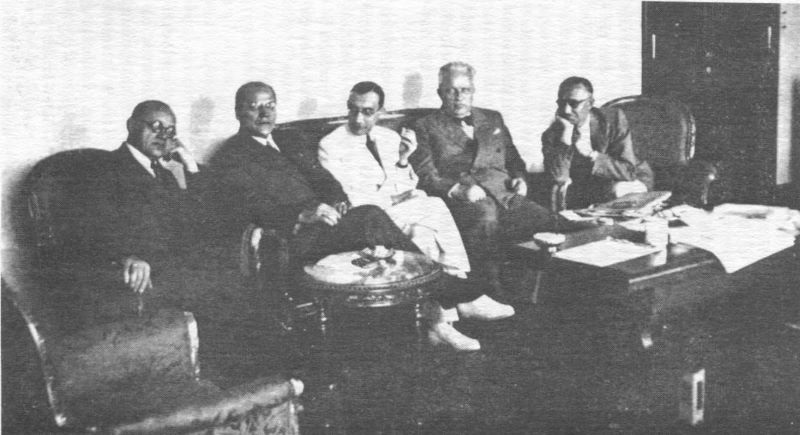
The 1940 Conference of Lithuanian Plenipotentiaries in Rome, which laid foundations for the armed resistance

In June 1940, the Lithuanian government submitted to the Soviet ultimatum and Lithuania was occupied, transformed into the Lithuanian SSR, and incorporated into the Soviet Union. The Soviets began implementing various Sovietization policies, including nationalization of private property, and mass arrests of political activists and others dubbed "enemies of the people". These arrests targeted many prominent politicians such as Aleksandras Stulginskis, Juozas Urbšys, Leonas Bistras, Antanas Merkys, Pranas Dovydaitis, Petras Klimas, government officials, military officers, and members of the Lithuanian Riflemen's Union. The Lithuanian Army was reorganized as the 29th Rifle Corps of the Red Army. The Soviets also closed all non-communist cultural, religious, and political organizations. The economic situation steadily worsened and the standard of living decreased.

A year later, just a week before the uprising, some 17,000 Lithuanians, mainly the intelligentsia, were taken with their entire families and deported to Siberia, where many died of the inhumane living conditions. It was the single most important precipitating event that incited popular support for the uprising and a positive predisposition toward the German invasion. Those who escaped the deportations or arrests spontaneously organized themselves into armed groups hidden in the forests and waited for the wider uprising.

The ultimate goal of the Lithuanian Activist Front (LAF), formed in the fall of 1940, was to re-establish Lithuanian independence. Started by Kazys Škirpa in Berlin, the LAF sought to unify the Lithuanian resistance, and organize and conserve resources for the planned uprising against the Soviets. It acted as an umbrella organization and many groups used the LAF name even though they were not connected with the LAF in Berlin. The LAF established its military–political headquarters in Vilnius and organizational headquarters in Kaunas. The communication and coordination between the centers in Berlin, Kaunas, and Vilnius were rather poor. The headquarters in Vilnius suffered heavily from Soviet arrests, especially in early June 1941, and became largely defunct. Most of those arrested activists were executed in December 1941 in the Soviet Union.

In March 1941, the LAF in Berlin published a memorandum, titled Brangūs vergaujantieji broliai (English: Dear Enslaved Brothers), with instructions on how to prepare for the war between Nazi Germany and the Soviet Union. Insurgents were asked to secure strategic objects like prisons, railroads, bridges, communication hubs, and factories, guarding them against potential sabotage by the retreating Red Army, while Central Headquarters was to organize a provisional government and declare independence. In April, a list of the members of the provisional government was compiled. The prime minister's post was reserved for Škirpa, four ministers were from Vilnius, six from Kaunas, and one from Berlin. The members represented a wide spectrum of pre-war political parties and, as such, claimed to represent a majority of the Lithuanian people. Some have suggested that not all of the designated ministers knew about their proposed appointment to the provisional government. On June 14, the Nazi authorities in Berlin insisted that Škirpa and his activists not form any government or make any public declarations without their prior approval. Škirpa agreed to this, but had very little control over the activists in Lithuania itself.

== June Revolt ==
=== German advances and Soviet retreat ===
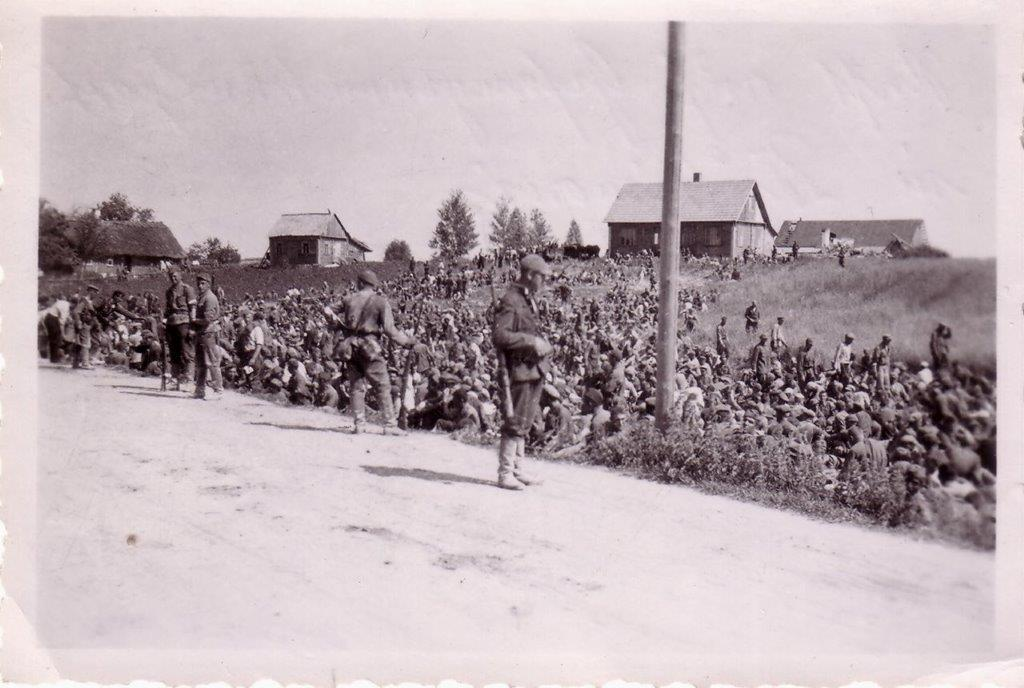
Soviet POWs under Lithuanian insurgent control in eastern Lithuania

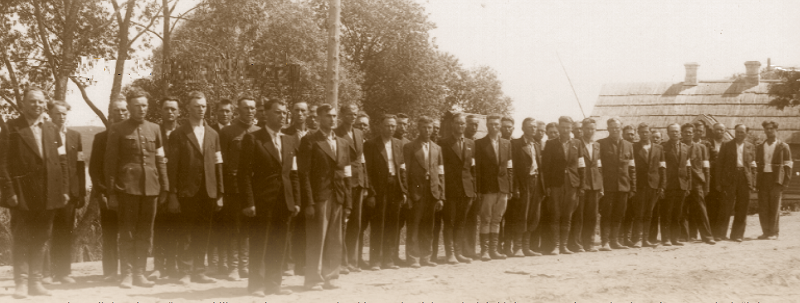
Lithuanian insurgents (LAF) lined up wearing their distinctive white and Lithuanian three colour armbands

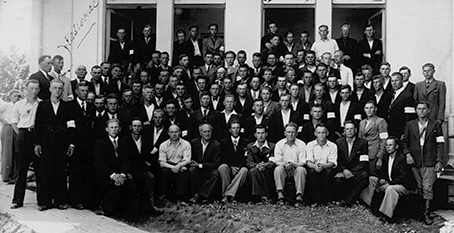
Lithuanian insurgents (LAF) in Vabalninkas, Lithuania

At 3:15 am on June 22, the territory of the Lithuanian SSR was invaded by two advancing German army groups: Army Group North, which took over western and northern Lithuania, and Army Group Centre, which took over most of the Vilnius Region. The Germans amassed some 40 divisions, 700,000 troops, 1,500 tanks, and 1,200 airplanes for the attack on the Lithuanian SSR. The Soviets had about 25 divisions, 400,000 troops, 1,500 tanks, and 1,344 airplanes in the Baltic Military District. 7 rifle and 6 motorized divisions from the 8th and 11th armies were located within Lithuanian territory.

The first attacks were carried out by the Luftwaffe against airports, airfields, and Lithuanian cities (Kėdainiai, Raseiniai, Karmėlava, Panevėžys, Jurbarkas, Ukmergė, Šiauliai, and others). These attacks killed some 4,000 civilians. Most of the Soviet Air Forces' aircraft were obliterated on the ground (322 airplanes were lost in the air versus 1,489 destroyed on ground). The Germans rapidly advanced, encountering only sporadic resistance from the Soviets near Kaltinėnai, Raseiniai, and Šiauliai, and assistance from the Lithuanians. In the Battle of Raseiniai, the Soviets attempted a counterattack, reinforced by tanks, but suffered heavy losses. Within a week, the Germans had sustained 3,362 casualties but controlled all of Lithuania. Soviet losses were heavy and not known precisely; estimates put them at 12–15 divisions. The Red Army also lost most of the aircraft stationed there, tanks, artillery, and other equipment.

==== German and Soviet atrocities ====
Despite the generally friendly Lithuanian attitude, the Germans carried out punitive executions. For example, 42 civilians from Ablinga village were killed in response to German deaths: After two German guards in Alytus were shot by unknown perpetrators, the Nazis shot 42 Lithuanian insurgents. The terror in Alytus continued the next day; the Germans selected men, age 15–50, and executed them in groups of 20–25.

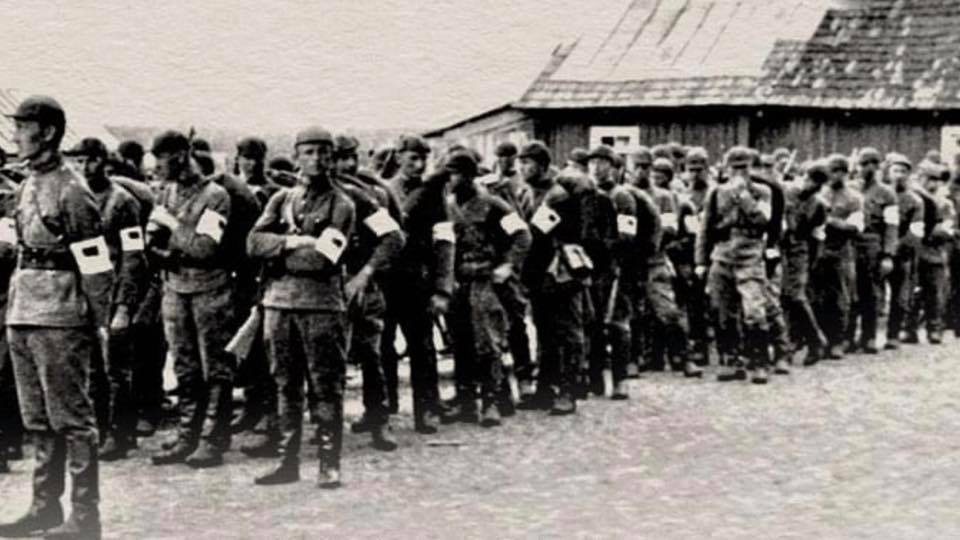
Lined up Lithuanian rebels (Lithuanian Activist Front) during the June Uprising in Lithuania, 1941. Their distinctive symbols were white armbands.

More atrocities were carried out by the retreating Red Army. About 4,000 political and criminal prisoners arrested during the first Soviet occupation were transported to the Soviet Union. The NKVD organized prisoner massacres in Rainiai, Pravieniškės, and Panevėžys. Forty mass killing sites have been identified in Lithuania. Many others were killed en route to Soviet prisons. The largest such massacre took place near Chervyen in present-day Belarus. A list of NKVD victims in Lithuania, compiled during the Nazi occupation, includes 769 people that did not participate in the uprising.

=== Lithuanian revolt ===
==== In Kaunas ====
The uprising began in the early morning of June 22, 1941, the first day of the war. LAF's main forces were concentrated in Kaunas. At 10:00 am, the LAF held a meeting in Žaliakalnis, dividing responsibilities. It decided that its main goal was not to fight the Soviets but to secure the city (i.e. organizations, institutions, enterprises) and declare independence. By the evening of June 22, the Lithuanians controlled the Presidential Palace, post office, telephone and telegraph, radio stations and radiophone. Control of the telephone systems allowed Lithuanians to disconnect all known communist numbers and talk to each other without passwords or codes. The Soviets had sabotaged the radio station, and repairs were carried out at night from June 22 to 23. Spare parts were delivered by medical students driving an ambulance. Despite fears that not enough Lithuanian forces were guarding the radio tower, on the morning of June 23, Leonas Prapuolenis read the declaration of Lithuanian independence and the list of members of the provisional government. The broadcast was repeated several times in Lithuanian, German, and French.

Also on the morning of June 23, 1941, insurgents raided Soviet armories in Šančiai, Panemunė, and Vilijampolė. Now armed, Lithuanians spread through the city. The Vilijampolė Bridge across the Neris River received special attention from the insurgents, as they expected the Germans to enter the city across this bridge. When the Lithuanians got there however, it was already wired with explosives. Forty Soviet troops and three armored vehicles protected the bridge and waited for the right moment to detonate. When the Soviets retreated from Lithuanian fire, Juozas Savulionis ran to the middle of the bridge, cut the wires, and saved it from destruction. On his way back, Savulionis was killed by Soviet fire, becoming one of the uprising's first victims.

The bridges over the Nemunas were prematurely destroyed by the retreating Soviets. This forced the Red Army units in Suvalkija to bypass Kaunas and may have saved the insurgents in that city. The Metalas factory became the headquarters of Šančiai insurgents who attempted to stop Soviet soldiers from crossing the Neman River by boat, or from building a pontoon bridge. In this fight, about 100 insurgents were killed, and 100 Soviets (including several officers) were taken prisoner, and a large booty of equipment (including three tanks which no one knew how to operate) was captured. Other groups secured police stations, shops, and warehouses, and attempted to re-establish general order in the city. The insurgents hastily organized their own police and freed some 2,000 political prisoners. They also organized publication of daily newspaper Į laisvę (English:Towards Freedom). Commander of the Red Army's 188th Rifle Division, Colonel Piotr Ivanov, reported to the 11th Army staff that during the retreat of his division through Kaunas "local counterrevolutionaries from the shelters purposefully and severely fired to the Red Army (which) suffered heavy losses of soldiers and military equipment".

On June 24, 1941, the Red Army's tank units in Jonava were ordered to retake Kaunas. The insurgents radioed the Germans for assistance. The Luftwaffe bombed the tank units and they did not reach the city. It was the first coordinated Lithuanian–German action. The first German scouts, Lieutenant Flohret, and four privates entered Kaunas on June 24 and found it in friendly hands. A day later, the main forces marched into the city without impediment, almost in a parade. On June 26, the German military command was ordered to disband and disarm the rebel groups. Two days later, Lithuanian guards and patrols were also relieved of their duties.

According to self-registration in July, there were about 6,000 insurgents, spontaneously organized into 26 groups in Kaunas. The largest groups numbered 200–250 men. Total Lithuanian casualties in Kaunas have been estimated at 200 dead and 150 wounded.

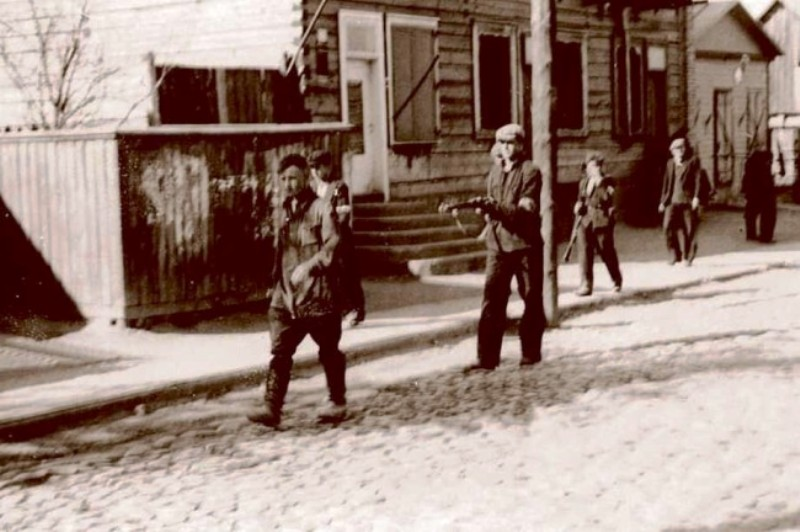
LAF activists lead the arrested Commissar of the Red Army in Kaunas

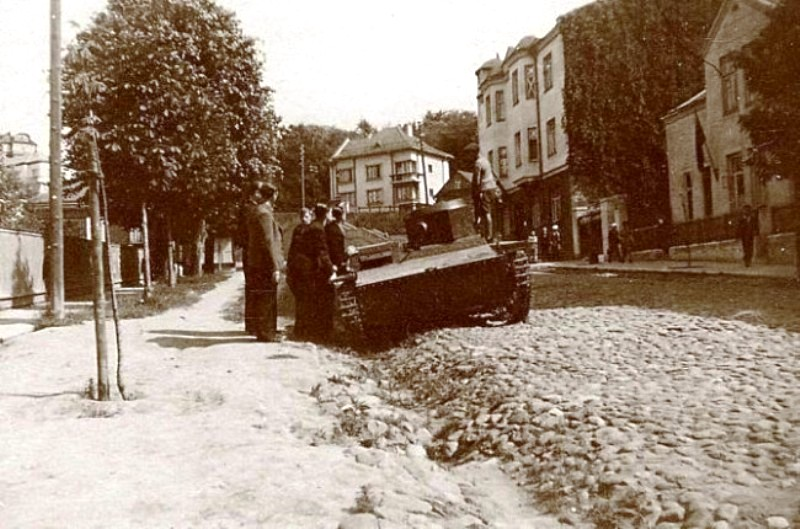
LAF activists inspect a T-38 tank from the Red Army in Kaunas

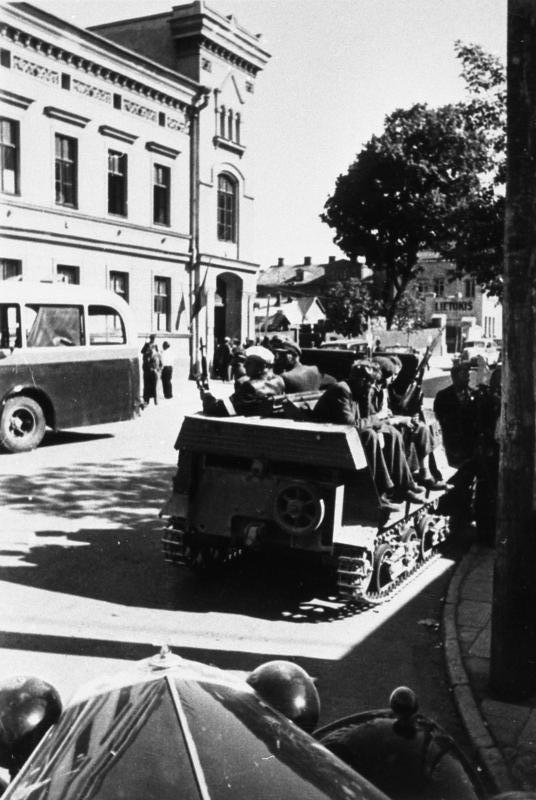
Lithuanian activists in Kaunas on June 25, 1941

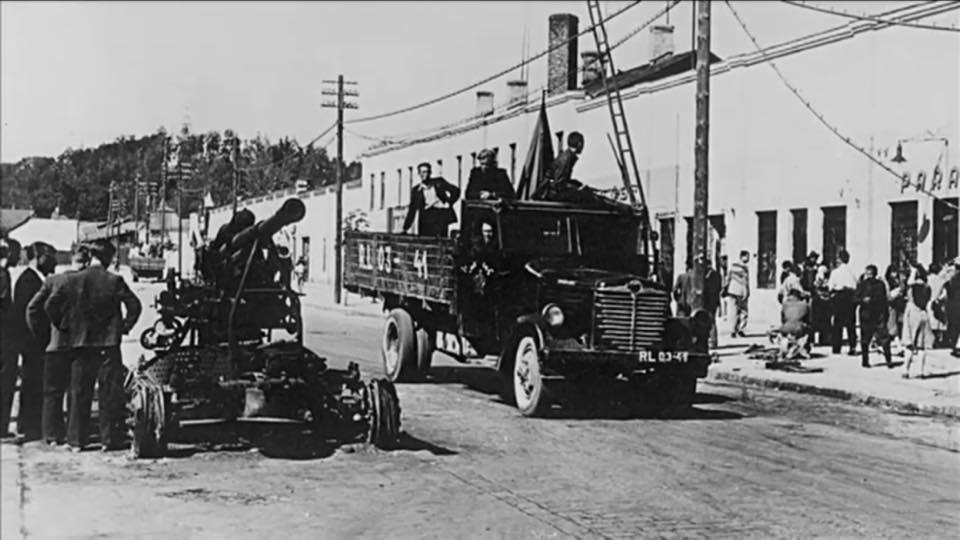
Lithuanian activists in Šančiai, Kaunas

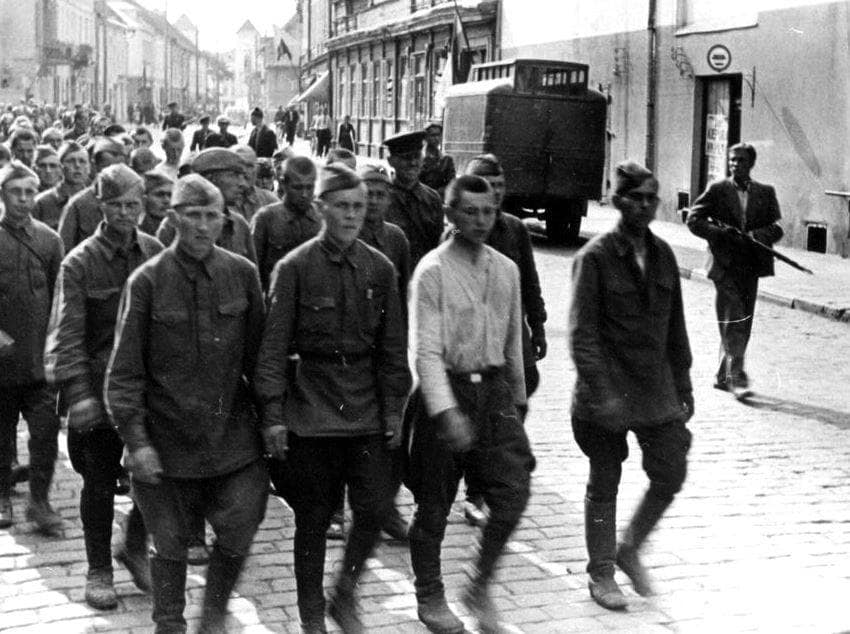
Lithuanian insurgents lead the disarmed soldiers of the Red Army in Kaunas

==== In Vilnius ====
In Vilnius, the LAF, commanded by Vytautas Bulvičius, had been dismantled by Soviet arrests just before the war and at the time, Lithuanians formed only a small minority of the city's population. The uprising there was smaller in scale and only started on June 23. The insurgents took over the post office, radio station, and other institutions, and raised the Lithuanian flag over Gediminas' Tower. It was easier to take control of Vilnius as most of the Red Army's units were located outside it and retreated rather quickly. The first German units entered the city on June 24. The 7th Panzer Division, commanded by Hans Freiherr von Funck, had expected Red Army resistance in Vilnius and made plans to bombard that city.

The 7,000–8,000 ethnic Lithuanians in the 29th Rifle Corps formed after the dissolution of the Lithuanian Army in 1940 deserted, and began gathering in Vilnius starting June 24. The 184th Rifle Division near Varėna was one of the first to face the advancing Germans. Taking advantage of chaos among the Soviet officers, Lithuanians separated from the main corps with only a few losses and gathered in Vilnius. Only 745 soldiers of the 184th Rifle Division reached the Soviet Union. The 179th Rifle Division was ordered to retreat from Pabradė–Švenčionėliai towards Pskov. On June 27, the division crossed the Lithuanian border and the Lithuanian soldiers mutinied. At least 120 Lithuanians were killed in various shootouts while attempting to desert. About 1,500 to 2,000 soldiers (of 6,000) of the 179th Rifle Division reached Nevel. Lithuanians hoped that the deserters would form the core of the new Lithuanian Army, but the Germans organized them into police battalions employed by the Germans. Some of them helped perpetrate the Holocaust.

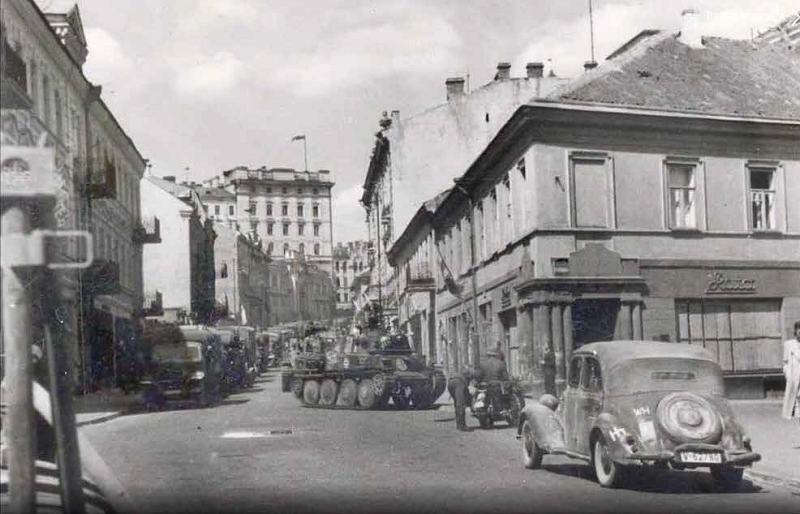
Buildings in Vilnius with the Lithuanian tricolor flags

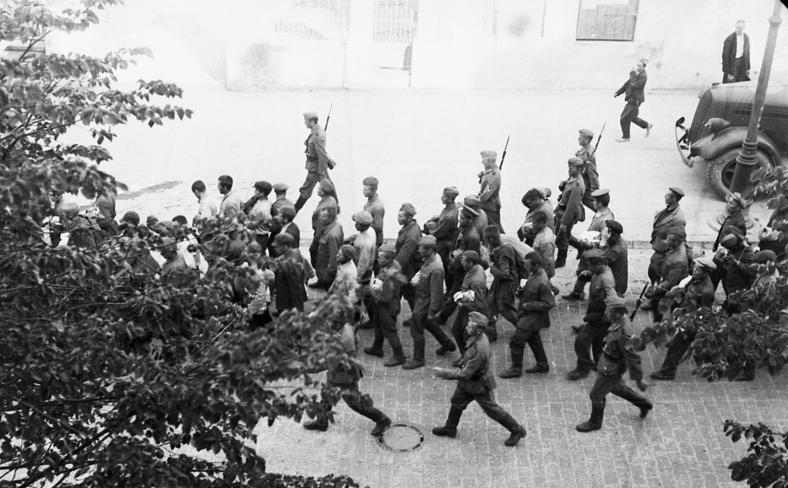
Soviet POWs escorted by German soldiers in Vilnius, June–July 1941

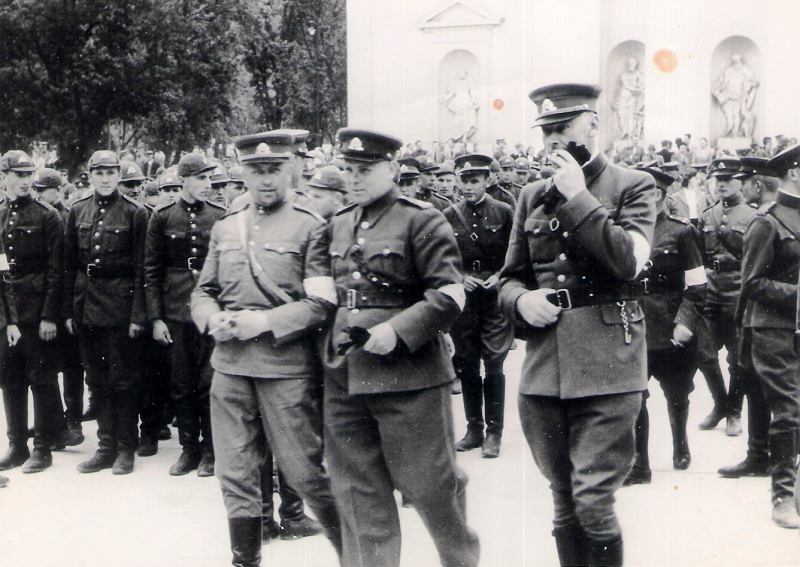
Lithuanian insurgents (LAF) and soldiers of the Lithuanian Army in Cathedral Square, Vilnius after the city was liberated from the Soviets

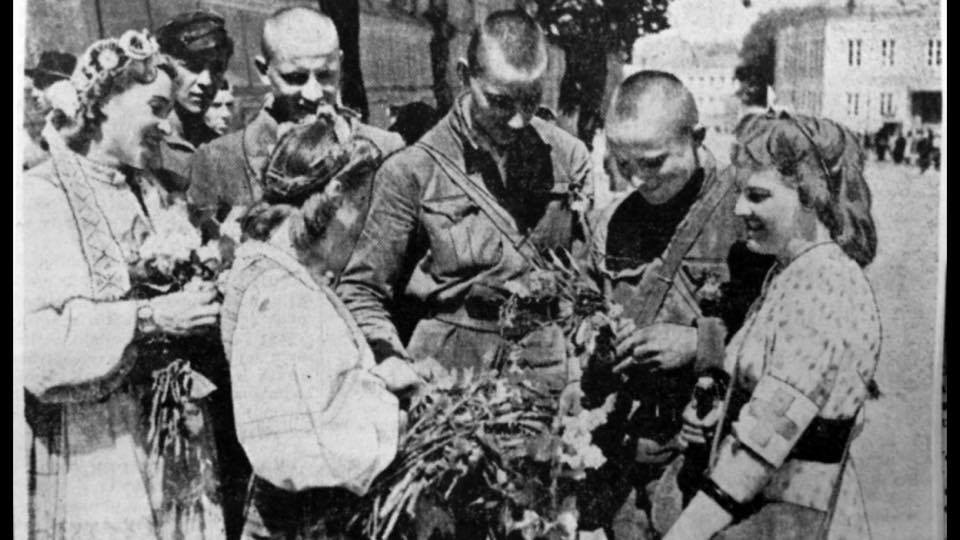
Lithuanian soldiers, liberated from the former Lithuanian corps of the Red Army, warmly greeted in Vilnius, Lithuania

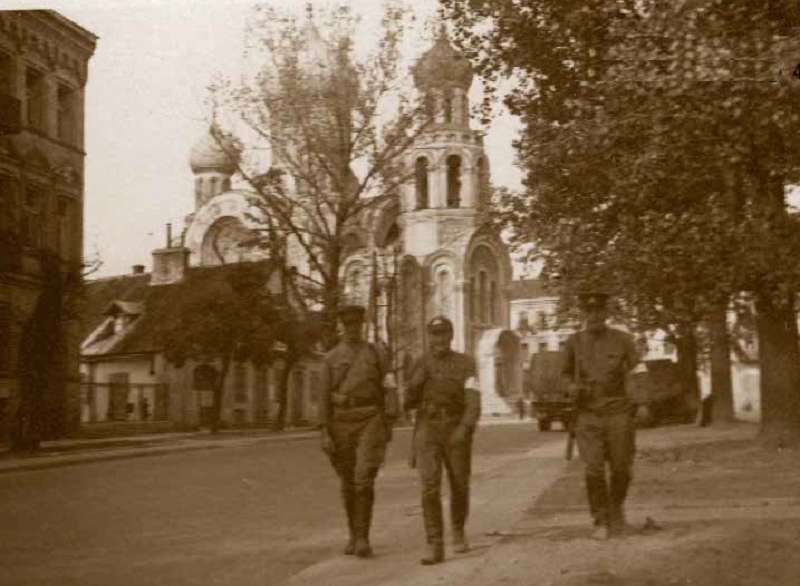
Lithuanian insurgents (LAF) patrolling the streets of Vilnius, Lithuania

==== Elsewhere and summary ====
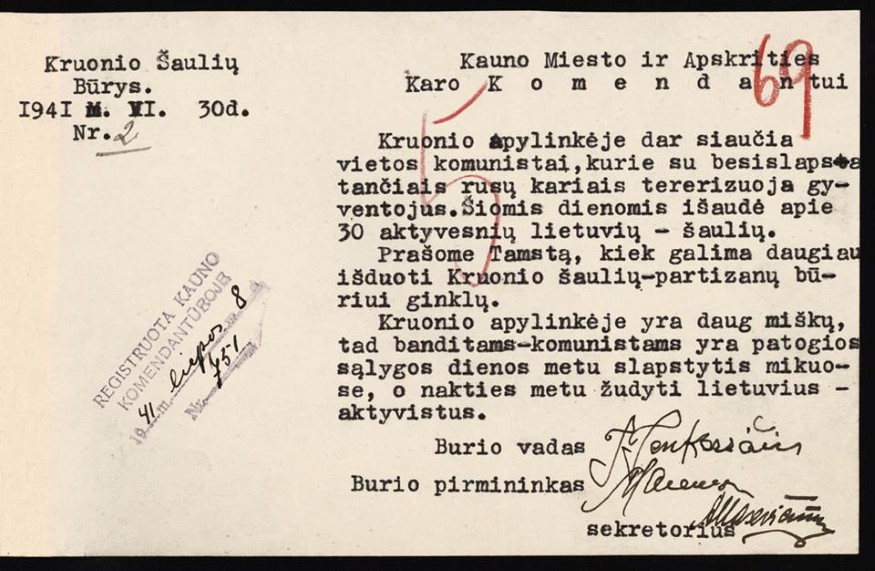
Members of the Lithuanian Riflemen's Union in Kruonis requests for more weapons to fight with communists and Soviet soldiers who are terrorizing the local residents

The uprising spread to other cities, towns, and villages. The level of rebel activities varied greatly across Lithuania and the uprising was spontaneous and chaotic. Men joined the uprising even though they had never heard of the LAF or organized resistance in Kaunas. In most areas, the insurgents followed the pattern set in Kaunas and Vilnius: to take control of local institutions, most importantly, the police, and secure other strategic objects. The insurgents also arrested Soviet activists, freed political prisoners, and hoisted Lithuanian flags. A lack of guns and ammunition was almost everywhere; these were mostly obtained by disarming surrendered Soviet troops. Most active insurgents were in the districts of Švenčionys, Mažeikiai, Panevėžys, and Utena. In some areas like Šiauliai, they had no noticeable rebel activities. Once Germans entered a settlement, they disarmed the insurgents. However, some local institutions (police, various committees) de facto established by the insurgents were later legalized de jure.

In the Soviet era, insurgents were persecuted and the uprising was censored from the history books. Memoirs and studies, published mainly by Lithuanian-Americans, inflated the number of Lithuanians activists to 90,000 or 113,000 and casualties to 2,000 or 6,000. After Lithuania regained independence in 1990 and new documents became available, historians revised the estimates down to 16,000–20,000 active participants and 600 casualties. Most insurgents were young men, between 18 and 25 years old. Soviet losses have been estimated at 5,000 men.

== Independence and provisional government ==
Attention! Attention! This is Kaunas speaking. Independent Lithuania. Declaration of the restoration of Lithuania's independence. Formed Provisional Government of the newly reborn Lithuania declares that it is restoring the free and independent state of Lithuania. In front of the pure conscience of the whole world, the young state of Lithuania enthusiastically promises to contribute to the organization of Europe on a new basis. The Lithuanian nation, tormented by the brutal Bolshevik terror, decided to build its future on the basis of national unity and social justice.

— Leonas Prapuolenis, the first announcement of the provisional government through the recently captured Kaunas' radio.

On June 23, 1941, at 9:28 am, "Tautiška giesmė", the national anthem of Lithuania, was played on the radio in Kaunas. LAF member Leonas Prapuolenis read the independence declaration Atstatoma laisva Lietuva (Free Lithuania is Restored). Prapuolenis announced the members of the provisional government and also asked the people to guard public and private property, asked workers to organize protection of factories, public institutions, and other important objects, and asked policemen to patrol their territories preserving the general public order. The message was repeated several times in Lithuanian, German, and French.

The first meeting of the provisional government took place on June 24. LAF activist Juozas Ambrazevičius replaced Kazys Škirpa, who was under house arrest in Berlin, as the prime minister. The new government attempted to take full control of the country, establish the proclaimed independence, and start a de-Sovietization campaign. During its six-week existence, over 100 laws, some prepared in advance, were issued, dealing with de-nationalization of land, enterprises, and real estate, restoration of local administrative units, formation of police, and other issues. The government did not have power in the Vilnius Region, under the control of a different army group. Hoping to survive, the government cooperated fully with the Nazi authorities.

The Germans did not recognize the new government, but also did not take any actions to dissolve it by force (unlike the government of Stepan Bandera in Ukraine). At first, German military administration tolerated the activities of the government as it did not attempt to take control of civilian institutions. The Reichskommissariat Ostland, German civil administration (Zivilverwaltung), was established on July 17. Rather than use brute force, the civil administration slowly removed the government's powers (for example, not allowing it to print its decrees in newspapers, or broadcast radio announcements) and supplanted its institutions, forcing the provisional government to either self-disband or to become a puppet institution. Willing to cooperate if that meant recognition and some semblance of autonomy, the government did not agree to become an instrument of German occupation. The government self-disbanded on August 5 after signing a protest against the Germans usurping the powers of the Lithuanian government.

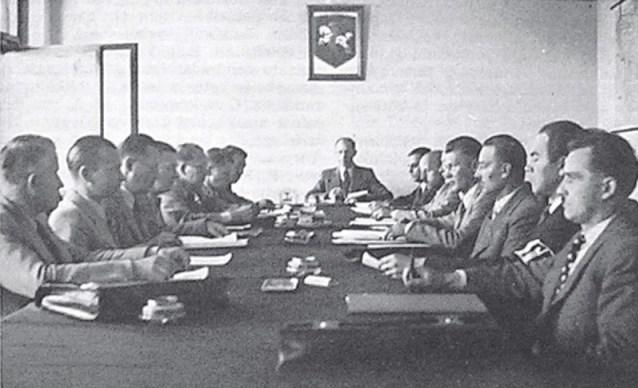
A session of the Provisional Government of Lithuania under the chairmanship of Juozas Ambrazevičius

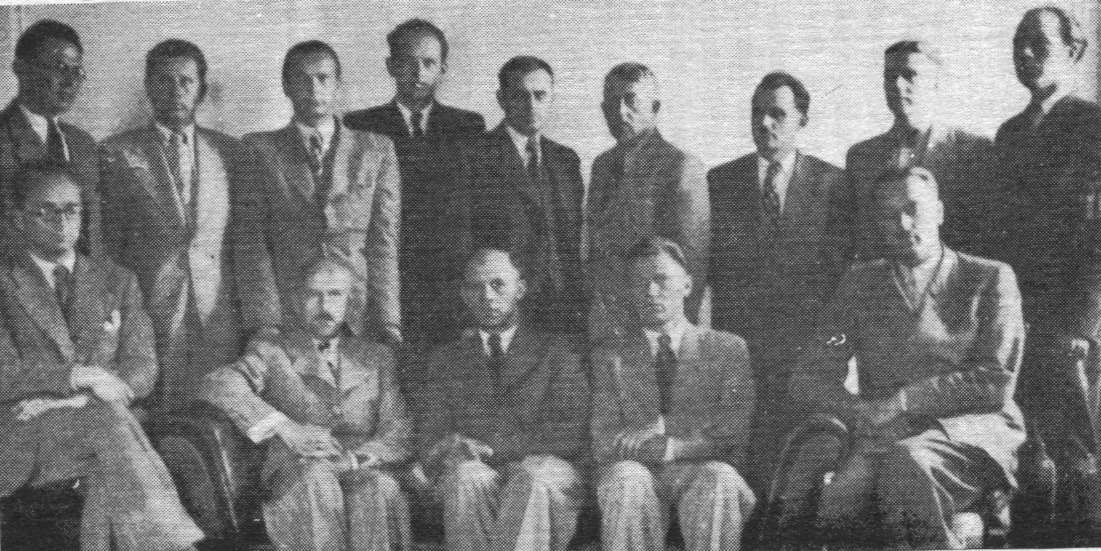
Participants of the last session of the provisional government

== Aftermath and controversies ==
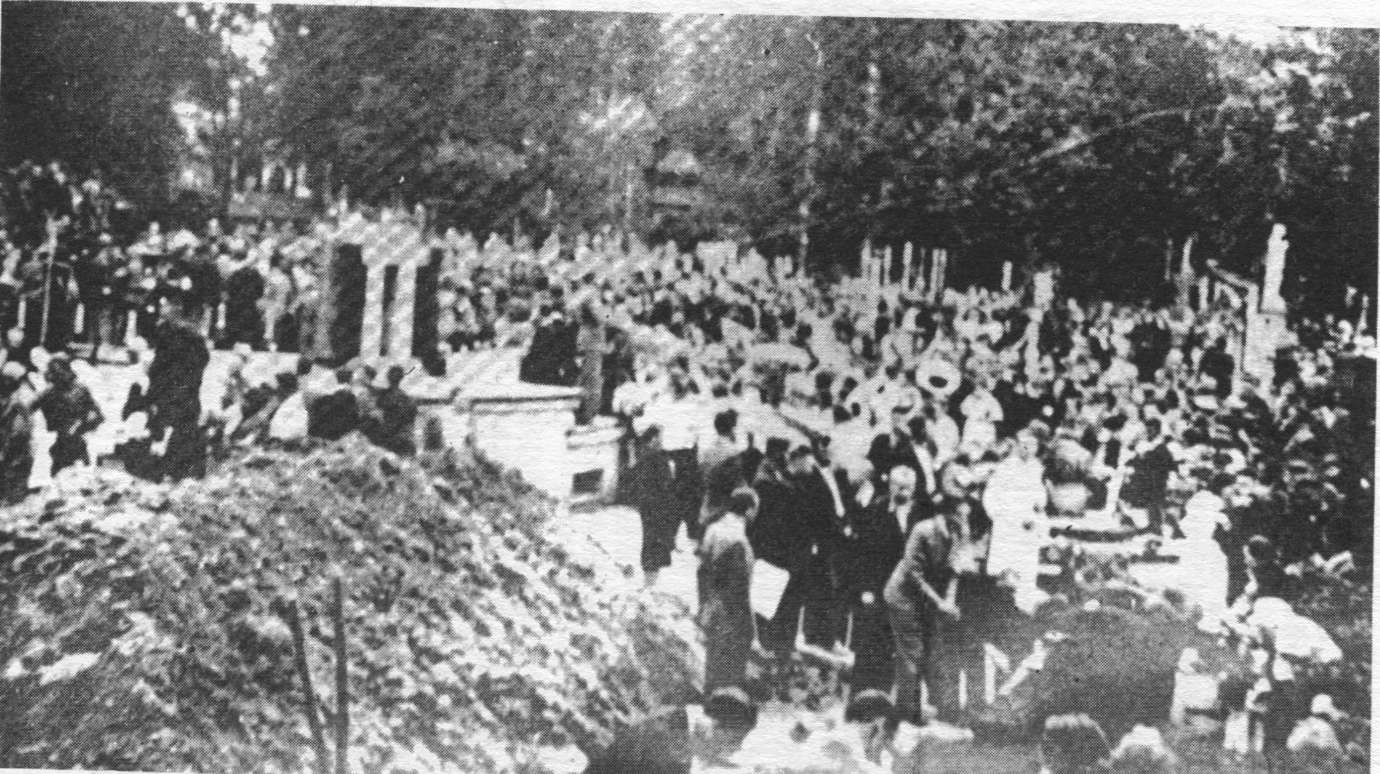
Funeral of the June Uprising casualties in Kaunas on June 26, 1941

Usurpation of public life continued after the demise of the provisional government. The Lithuanian Activist Front was banned in September 1941 and some of its leaders transported to concentration camps. In December, the last legal party of Lithuania, pro-Nazi Lithuanian Nationalist Party, was also banned. Most of the laws adopted by the provisional government remained paper declarations. However, a couple of laws of no immediate interest to the Germans, including local administration and education, had somewhat lasting effects. The remaining government developed local administration staffed with Lithuanians. This allowed some passive resistance when German orders from the top could be blocked by the bottom. For example, Lithuanians resisted recruiting for a Waffen-SS division, quotas for forced labor in Germany, and the Germanization of Lithuanian schools. However, many museums, libraries, and other cultural centres were plundered by the Nazis, and the artefacts shipped to Germany. As they retreated from Lithuania, the Nazis burned hundreds of buildings, plants, bridges and railways to the ground before the advancing Soviet troops, and transported some of the disassembled machinery, inventories, and raw materials to Germany.

Despite its failure to establish independence and meager long-term results, as Kazys Škirpa summarized in his memoirs, the uprising demonstrated the determination of the Lithuanian people to have their own independent state and dispelled the myth that Lithuania had joined the Soviet Union voluntarily in June 1940. The uprising also contributed to unusually rapid German advances against the Soviet Union; Pskov was reached in 17 days. The events of June 1941 also caused some controversies. At the time, Lithuanian diplomats abroad, including former president Antanas Smetona and Stasys Lozoraitis, described the uprising as "Nazi-inspired". These statements might have been attempts to persuade the United States, Great Britain, and other Western powers that Lithuania was not an ally of the Nazis. The Provisional Government has been criticized for antisemitic slogans and decrees, particularly the Žydų padėties nuostatai (Regulations on the Status of Jews) of August 1. Its military unit, the Tautinio Darbo Apsaugos Batalionas (TDA), was employed by the Einsatzkommando and Rollkommando Hamann and local Lithuanian collaborators often drawn from the LAF in the mass executions of Lithuanian Jews in the Seventh fort of the Kaunas Fortress and in the provinces. Jewish survivors and Lithuanian historians have documented that members of the LAF, especially in Kaunas but also in other towns, committed indiscriminate and gruesome excesses against Jewish residents, including mass killings of unarmed civilians, including women and children, often before the Nazis arrived to take control, most notably characterized by the Kaunas pogrom but also in many other towns throughout Lithunania.

== Bibliography ==
- Anušauskas, Arvydas; et al., eds. (2005). Lietuva, 1940–1990 (in Lithuanian). Vilnius: Lietuvos gyventojų genocido ir rezistencijos tyrimo centras. ISBN 9986-757-65-7.
- Brandišauskas, Valentinas (2018-06-21). Tutlys, Sigitas (ed.). "Birželio sukilimas". Visuotinė lietuvių enciklopedija (in Lithuanian).
- Bubnys, Arūnas (1998). Vokiečių okupuota Lietuva (1941–1944) (in Lithuanian). Vilnius: Lietuvos tautinis kultūros fondas. ISBN 9986-757-12-6.
- Gerutis, Albertas, ed. (1984). Lithuania: 700 Years. Translated by Budreckis, Algirdas (6th ed.). New York: Manyland Books. ISBN 0-87141-028-1. LCCN 75-80057.
- Ivinskis, Zenonas (Summer 1966). "The Lithuanian Revolt Against the Soviets in 1941". Lituanus: Lithuanian Quarterly Journal of Arts and Sciences. 12 (2). ISSN 0024-5089. Archived from the original on 2022-08-19.
- Jazavita, Simonas (2018). "Kazio Škirpos Lietuvos valstybingumo galimybių koncepcija ir jos palyginimas su Josifo Tiso valdyta Slovakija Antrojo pasaulinio karo metais – tarp realių ir nerealių alternatyvų" [Kazys Škirpa's conception of statehood possibilities for Lithuania and its comparison with Slovakia under the rule of Jozef Tiso during the years of World War II: between real and unreal alternatives]. Istorija (in Lithuanian). 112.
- Misiunas, Romuald J.; Taagepera, Rein (1993). The Baltic States: Years of Dependence 1940–1990 (expanded ed.). University of California Press. ISBN 0-520-08228-1.
- Narutis, Pilypas (1994). Tautos sukilimas 1941 Lietuvos nepriklausomybei atstatyti / Lithuanian uprising 1941 Struggle for independence – caught between Nazi Germany and Soviet Empire (1st ed.). Oak Lawn, Ill: McNaughton & Gunn. OCLC 977406244.
