= Daugavpils Ghetto =

Nazi ghetto in occupied Latvia

Coordinates: 55°52′46″N 26°29′25″E

- Jews in the Daugavpils Ghetto, probably in August, 1941
- Also known as: Dvinsk ghetto, the Citadel, Ghetto Dünaburg
- Location: Daugavpils, Latvia and vicinity, including Pogulyanka (Poguļanka) Forest (sometimes called Mežciems forest).
- Date: June 26, 1941 to October 1943
- Incident type: Imprisonment, mass shootings, forced labor, starvation
- Perpetrators: Erich Ehrlinger, Joachim Hamann, Günter Tabbert, Roberts Blūzmanis
- Organizations: Nazi SS, Rollkommando Hamann, Arajs Kommando, Latvian Auxiliary Police
- Victims: 13,000 to 16,000 Jews, mostly Latvians with some Lithuanians
- Survivors: About 100

Following the occupation of Latvia by Nazi Germany in the summer of 1941, the Daugavpils Ghetto (German: Ghetto Dünaburg) was established in an old fortress near Daugavpils. Daugavpils is the second largest city in Latvia, located on the Daugava River in the southeastern, Latgale, region of Latvia. The city was militarily important as a major road and railway junction. Before World War II, Daugavpils was the center of a thriving Jewish community in the Latgale region and one of the most important centers of Jewish culture in eastern Europe. Over the course of the German occupation of Latvia, the vast majority of the Jews of Latgale were killed as a result of the Nazi extermination policy.

== Nomenclature ==
The city of Daugavpils is also known by the Russian name of Dvinsk and the German name of Dünaburg. Many of the killings associated with the ghetto occurred in the nearby Pagulanka forest, which is also seen spelled as Polulanka and Pogulianski. Although known as a "ghetto", this old fortress was converted into a prison to hold Jews on a temporary basis before they were killed in the Pagulanka forest. Similar places in Latvia were called "concentration camps".

== The Holocaust begins in Daugavpils ==
At that time, about 12,000 Jews lived in Daugavpils. In front of the German army, a huge column of refugees, including not only Jews from Lithuania, but Red Army soldiers separated from their units, began to move northeast on the highway from Kaunas (also known as Kovno) to Daugavpils, where the refugees expected to find safety or perhaps board a train for the east. Some Jewish refugees managed to reach the Soviet border, but they were prevented from crossing by NKVD guards. Eventually some were allowed to cross, but it was too late for most.

Following several days of aerial bombardment, the German army captured Daugavpils on June 26, 1941, but there was still fighting in the near vicinity for several days. A fire burned in the city, which the Nazis later chose to blame on the Jews. According to EK 1b's official report:

During the following two days [June 27 and June 28], the larger part of the city burned down. Only a small part of the city was damaged by battle activity. During the following days fires were caused by arson. Before leaving, the Russians had issued a proclamation announcing the burning of the city. The Jews decisively participated in setting the city on fire.

On June 29, 1941, at the order of Robert Blūzmanis, who had been appointed by the Germans as the police chief of the Latvian police in Daugavpils, large signs were posted around the city announcing in German, Russian and Latvian that all Jewish males below the age of 60 were to report that morning to the main marketplace, failure to do so would be met with "the maximum penalty." Some of them were put to work burying the bodies of civilians and Red Army soldiers killed in the fighting, and later, dead horses. Many others were forced to dig their own graves and simply murdered outright.

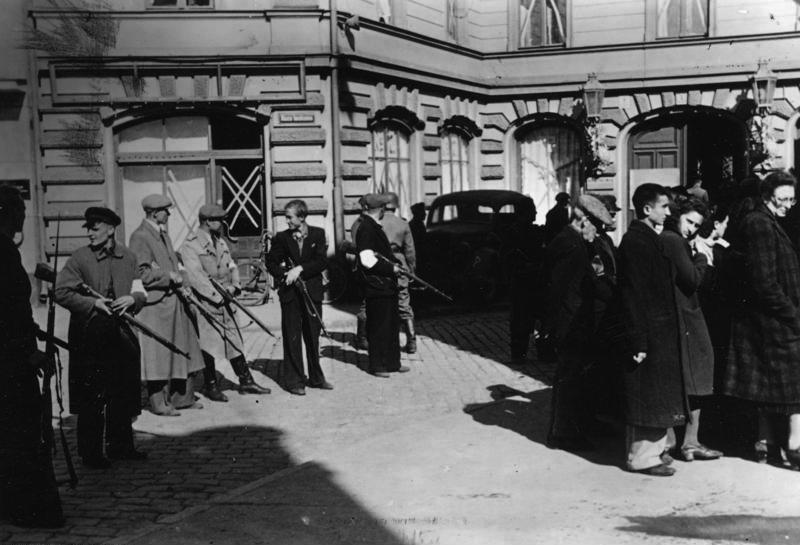
This image, taken in Liepāja, Latvia, in July 1941, shows native Latvians armed and guarding Jews

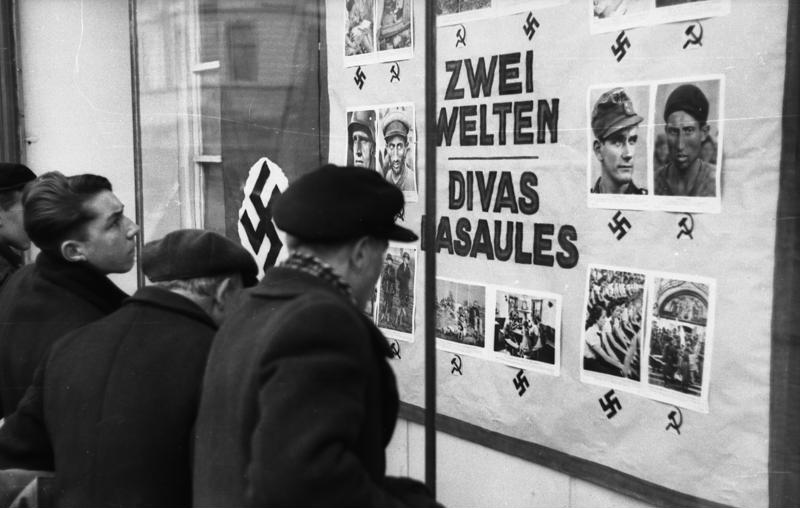
German propaganda image showing Latvians reading German propaganda display

== Early killings ==
Mass killings of Jews in Latvia were part of an overall plan developed at the highest level of the German government. Aspects of the plan as it was applied to Latvia had been applied in other countries, such as burning of synagogues (Germany) and ghettoization (Poland). Latvia presented a new development in the Holocaust, which was the implementation of mass killings immediately upon the occupation of a country.

The Sicherheitsdienst (SD) attempted to stir up local anti-Jewish feeling by forcing Jews to dig up mass graves of Latvians who had been murdered by the NKVD in the Soviet occupation that had begun in June 1940. This was part of an overall SD plan to associate the Jews with Communism and Russians, both unpopular in Latvia. Latvian guards at early executions would ask the Jews waiting to be executed if they felt like singing "Katyusha". (Katyusha was a popular Russian patriotic song of World War II.)

On June 28, 1941, two days after the fall of Daugavpils, the Nazis rounded up Jews in a synagogue, and then took them out and shot them. Other Jews were randomly murdered simply walking down the street. On Sunday June 29, 1941, the German army began rounding up Jewish men in Daugavpils to subject them to terror, humiliation and imprisonment under brutal and overcrowded conditions. At gun point the Germans made them shout "Heil Hitler", and sing Deutschland über alles. Survivors reported:

– They were seizing Jews in the streets of Dvinsk and taking them to the prison where they were severely tormented. They were forced to lie down on the ground and jump up again; those who could not do it fast enough were shot. (Sema Shpungin)

– One of the murderers went up to my father and shouted to his face: 'How many houses did you burn?' and gave him a blow with his pistol. * * * two Germans entered and started to shout that we are communists and that's why we're hiding – and they wanted to arrest us. (Paula Frankel-Zaltzman)

The Germans accused them of setting fire to Daugavpils. According to Stahlecker's official report:

In Latvia as well the Jews participated in acts of sabotage and arson after the invasion of the German Armed Forces. In Duenaburg so many fires were lighted by the Jews that a large part of the town was lost. The electric power station burnt down to a mere shell. The streets which were mainly inhabited by Jews remained unscathed.

Jews in general and Lithuanian refugees in particular were accused of being communists. On July 8, 1941, a newspaper in Daugavpils (Daugavpils Latviešu Avīze), published an editorial consistent with the German efforts to blame the Jews for communist atrocities:

The time has come to end all service to the Jews, to end every selling of oneself to the Jews! ... One must remember that it was the Jews who greeted the Red Army in July 1940 and enslaved, tortured and killed Latvians during communist rule.

As time went on, increased numbers of Latvian auxiliary police guarded the prison where the Jewish men were held. By July 8, the work had become so hard that the Jews were literally being worked to death. One assignment included rolling huge blocks of stone to the top of a hill, another including carrying heavy timbers several kilometers. German guards struck prisoners with whips at will. Later, the expression arose among the widows of the men who were rounded up and killed on June 29 about their husbands that, "'he was taken way to prison that First Sunday.'"

== Railroad Park massacre ==
By July 7, 1941, the Latvia police had arrested about 1,250 people, including 1,125 Jews, and were holding them in the main prison in Daugavpils. Erich Ehrlinger, the commander of Einsatzkommando Ib, was tried in a West German court in the 1960s. The court found that four early massacres had occurred in Daugavpils, including two in a place matching the description of 'Railroad Park', also called the Railwayman's Garden (Latvian: Dzelzceļniecki dārzs), one at the army training grounds near Mežciems, and another near a cemetery about a half hour's walking distance to the north of the city. Professor Ezergailis believed these may not have been properly described to the court.

Iwens, a survivor of the Railroad Park massacre, gives one of the few descriptions of it. On July 8, 1941, the Germans forced a detail of Jews to dig ditches in the Railroad Park, The next day, July 9, the Germans began shooting Jews and pushing the bodies into the ditches. The sound of gunshots, occurring at regular intervals, could be heard in the city. Among the murdered was one man who tried to explain to a guard that he was a decorated veteran of the German army from the First World War. While the guards in this operation were Latvian, the supervisors were entirely German. One German officer hummed the Beer Barrel Polka in between shooting people in the back of the head. The Germans filled-in all the trenches dug on July 8 with the bodies of the persons murdered on July 9, but there were still a lot of people left alive whom they had intended to kill. At the end of the killings on July 8, the survivors were put to work digging new graves and tamping down the earth over the bodies in the previous trenches. The next day, July 10, the killings resumed. The survivor Iwens reported after the war what he had learned from another survivor, Haim Kuritzky, about what occurred at the pits:

At a long ditch ahead of them were four Latvian auxiliaries loading their rifles. A German officer yelled at the prisoners, "Four of you, march ahead." When the men reached the ditch, the German yelled "fire!" Each of the Latvians fired at one man – one bullet in the head at close range – and the four fell in the ditch. "The next four." They were also shot. (All this was being filmed by German soldiers).

Kuritsky was saved when the Germans turned out to have miscalculated the number of bodies they could place in the pits:

But then, the remaining prisoners were given spades and ordered to cover the ditches with dirt – there was no more room. The ditches were full of dying people and blood. They struggled spasmodically like fish out of water ... heads hanging back ... a wet, slippery, moving mass ...

Anyone not working fast enough to cover the bodies was ordered to lie down on them and was shot by the German officer, who screamed at them "faster, faster", and raved hysterically against the Jews. The number killed is unclear. Iwens, who while present, was trying to survive, said "thousands" were killed. The Germans reported killing 1,150 Jews by July 11. The Germans later separated from those who identified themselves as craftsmen, such as carpenters, from the professionals. Some of the craftsmen were kept alive for a while, but the professionals were killed immediately. After the Railroad Park massacre, few Germans were seen in the area of the prison, which was run for the most part by the Latvian auxiliary police.

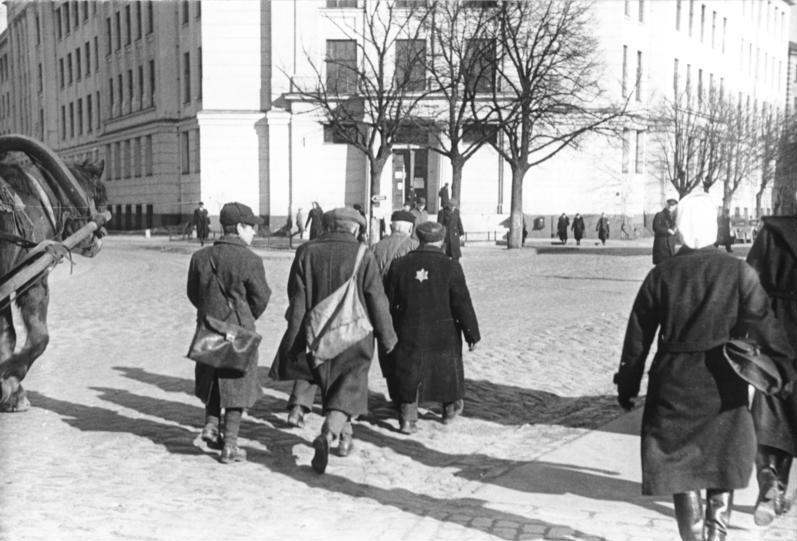
This image, captured in Riga in 1942, shows both the yellow star Jews were required to wear in Latvia and also the requirement that they walk in the roadway and not on the sidewalk

== Measures against Jews ==
Roberts Blūzmanis, the Latvian police chief in Daugavpils, carried out the SD's wishes for certain Jewish restrictions. It was Blūzmanis, acting for the SD, who ordered that all Jews in Daugavpils over four years of age wear six-pointed yellow stars on the front and back of their clothing. According to Stahlecker, chief of Einsatzgruppe A:

Marking of the Jews by a yellow star, to be worn on the breast and the back which was ordered in the first instance by provisional orders of the Security Police, was carried out within a short time on the basis of regulations issued by the Commander of the Rear area and later by the Civil Administration.

Later, the Nazis forbade Jews to use the sidewalks, to speak to non-Jews and to read newspapers. Frankel-Zaltzman reported being shouted at as she and her parents were driven out of their home: "Nobody dare step on the sidewalk! Yudn [Jews] must run in the middle of the road like dogs!"

== Construction of the ghetto ==
Construction of the ghetto began on July 18, 1941, as confirmed by Stahlecker himself: "Apart from organizing and carrying out measures of execution, the creation of Ghettos was begun in the larger towns at once during the first days of operations.". Jewish forced labor was used to build the ghetto, which was not an actual housing district, but rather a decrepit fortress on the west side of the Daugava river, a short distance just to the northwest of the suburb of Griva, across from the main city of Daugavpils.: "In July, as the initial wave of shootings subsided, the local Germans and their Latvian counterparts rounded up some 14,000 Jews from Daugavpils and the outlying areas of Latgale and crammed them into the old Daugavpils fort, 'the Citadel'."

== Forced relocation to the ghetto ==
On July 25, 1941, the Germans issued an order that all Jews were to relocate to the ghetto by the next day. In addition to all the Jews of Daugavpils, those assembled on July 26, were to be marched into the fortress, including Jews from Lithuania and from the area surrounding Daugavpils. Frankel-Zaltzman described the scene:

On Tuesday evening we heard cries from the distance. The cries came nearer and nearer until we realized that these were the cries of tortured Jews. The next day we discovered that into the ghetto the remaining Jews had been gathered from all the surrounding villages. From Dvinsk alone, then from Dondo, Vishkes, Krislovke, Indra, Livengoff, Nitzkol and from all the way to Riga. The Latvian population had been told that they will no longer see a Jew, not even in the museum, even if one were to pay two lot [Latvian money] for a Jew there would not be one to be had.

Some had been forced to walk up to 50 kilometers. The Latvian guards enforced their commands by beating the workers with clubs that were four or five feet long. Among other things, Jews were beaten if they smiled upon recognizing another Jewish prisoner. Iwens, an eyewitness, reported that "many women had to cope with their children and aged parents all by themselves, for their men had been killed in the prison massacre."

== Perpetrators ==
Einsatzgruppe A was assigned by Reinhard Heydrich to kill the Jews of the Baltic states, including Latvia. Franz Walter Stahlecker was in command of Einsatzgruppen A. It operated in smaller squads known as Einsatzkommandos. Latgale and Daugavpils were assigned to Einsatzkommando 1b, who, under Erich Ehrlinger, had killed about 1,150 people, mostly Jews, by July 11, 1941. Ehrlinger's successor as of about July 11, was Joachim Hamann, who killed 9,012 Jews in Daugavpils, including many brought in from small towns in southern Latgale before he was reassigned on August 22.

The chief of the local auxiliary police, Robert Blūzmanis, was in charge of the local Latvian auxiliary police. His role in the killings was to confine the Jews to the Grīva fortress ghetto and move them out to the killing places. Latvian self-defence men and Arājs murderers were also involved. It appears that Latvian police from the Daugavpils municipality were also involved. One of the precinct chiefs, Arvīds Sarkanis, wrote explicitly of "the liquidation of the Jews", providing the most detailed account of the participation of the Latvian police.

Zaube, the German commandant of the Daugavpils ghetto, stood out for his extreme cruelty. He executed people who infringed his many rules, especially those who had smuggled in food, on the inner square of the ghetto in front of all inmates to frighten and to intimidate them. It was in Daugavpils that the liquidation of ghetto inmates started. From November 8 to 10 1941, 3,000 people were killed in Mežciems. The operation was headed by Obersturmbannführer (Lieutenant-Colonel) Günter Tabbert, who was then 25.

Participation by local Latvians in the Daugavpils killings and ghettoization was initially minimal; but after two weeks of the German occupation, it became extensive. A Latvian SD unit was set up in Daugavpils, as well as a unit of auxiliary police. Along with the SD, these organizations persecuted, confined and eventually killed the Jews of the Daugavpils ghetto, but the precise extent of their involvement is unclear, because for the major killings, the Arājs commando would be brought in from Riga.

== July and August killings ==
=== Ruse employed ===
In the parlance of the perpetrators and the victims, the German word "aktion" (literally, action) came to mean "mass shooting." 'Actions' went on continuously in the Daugavpils area from late July when the ghetto was formed, until near the end of August. On August 1, 1941, Jewish ghetto police announced that a new camp had been prepared not far from the ghetto, and directed that Jews not residents of Daugavpils were to gather their belongings and relocate there. According to Frankel-Zaltzman:

If, up to now, the crowding was bad, it got even worse [following the arrival of the Jews from other parts of Latgale and Latvia], unbearable. But the commandants of the ghetto said that it would soon become "roomier." A new camp/lager would be established for the newcomers and whoever will want to will be able to go along. In three days time an order was issued that all newcomers must go to a new camp."

Other sources state that it was the old and sick who were called upon to report in the first action; the date was July 27, 1941. Thousands of people were crammed into the small old fortress, with only two water taps, almost no sanitary facilities, and no food. Many people were naturally anxious to leave. A column of 2,000 people was quickly formed up, and marched out under the guard of Latvian auxiliary police. A few days later, possibly on August 6, a similar offer was extended to all parents with small children, with similar results.

=== Murder in the forest ===
Instead of going to a new camp, these columns were marched to a set of prepared graves at a former Latvian army training ground in the Pogulianka woods, near the resort of Mežciems, where Germans and Latvian auxiliaries shot the people and pushed their bodies into previously excavated pits. It was reported however that babies were not shot, but simply thrown into a pit and buried alive. By July 28, 1941, old and sick people had also been taken out of the ghetto in a separate incident. They were also murdered. The earthen cover heaped on the graves was quite thin, and two boys only slightly wounded and on the top of the heaped bodies dug themselves out and escaped. Use of the forested area to conceal the murders was typical of mass shootings in Latvia; the murders in the Railroad Park were an exception. The executioners were often quite drunk. During the first two weeks in August, 1941, the SD, carried out additional "selections" at the ghetto, choosing who would live and who would die. There were also major actions on August 18 and 19. Mothers, children, the aged and the sick were generally picked to die. In particular there was a massacre of 400 children from an orphanage. The only security appeared to be being selected for work by the Germans, which required a document known as a Schein to prove that a person was working for a German military unit. While a Schein was not a guarantee against execution, lack of one was almost certain to lead to death. As units moved to the front, it became more difficult to procure a Schein.

=== Number of victims ===
As a result of various Aktions in August, the ghetto population had been reduced to about 6,000 to 7,000 people. According to Nazi Karl Jäger, a component of Einsatzkommando 3 had killed 9,012 Jews in Daugavpils between July 13 and August 21, 1941. Another Nazi report states that 9,256 Jews were executed in Daugavpils up to October 15, 1941. There was a halt in the actions for 10 weeks after August 22, 1941, when Hamann was reassigned and Obersturmbannführer Günter Hugo Friedrich Tauber took over. He was then 25 years old.

== Life in the ghetto ==
=== Jewish administration ===
The ghetto was not a ghetto in the sense of a city district mandated or set aside by custom for Jews. It was an improvised prison, to hold the Jews until they could be done away with. The Jews formed their own "committee" (komitet, sometimes translated "council") of about 12 inmates, mostly professional and well-known people, to run the internal affairs of the ghetto, which at first had more than 14,000 people. Misha Movshenzon (also spelled Mowshenson), an engineer, was the leader of the committee. (Another source says Movshenzon was on the committee but gives Mosche Galpern as the chairman.) Movshenzon's father had been in charge of the city of Daugavpils in 1918, when the Germans occupied the city during World War I. Jews from other towns and villages of Latgalia and as far away as Vidzeme province were forced into the ghetto. Men and women were separated in the ghetto. Some income from the labor of the Jews was allocated to the Jewish Council.

=== Treatment by the Germans ===
Skilled workmen were housed separately and received better treatment, including better rations. Survivors record that cruelty was not universal. Iwens reported a number of instances of kind treatment from, among others, a German airman, who was shocked by the suffering of the children in the ghetto. His brother (later among the murdered), similarly was well-treated by a German unit where he worked in the kitchen. On another occasion, two German soldiers, aware that the SD was selecting for execution Jews who had no work, pretended they were needed for work with their unit, thus saving, at least for a while, a group of about 30 people. Iwens described the situation from his point of view as a Jew who had been allowed to live as a skilled worker:

The Germans protected us because our work was of use to them; it was also true that some felt sorry for us – especially for "their" Jews,' those they had gotten to know personally. Whenever Jews worked for any length of time, with ordinary German soldiers, their relationship often became quite friendly. At 322, Yasha Magid, the 'Oberjude', and Dr. Itzikowitz were much respected by their chief and so was Margaram at our place. The fact that Jews understood the German language, whereas most gentiles did not, was also helpful. But we had no illusions. Sooner or later there would be a direct order and we'd be done away with.

Another survivor, Frankel-Zaltzman, described how the last survivors of the ghetto learned from a German soldier that they would not be massacred, as they had feared, on June 26, 1942, which was the one-year anniversary of the fall of Daugavpils:

* * * there was suddenly a knock at the window. A soldier came to tell us that we can sleep in peace. * * * "You can believe me and I want you not to give me away when the chief himself will come to tell you this, because I wasn't supposed to come and tell you the good news, but I am not an enemy of the Jews and I see how you are suffering." The soldier went away and we didn't know if we should rejoice because maybe this is a trick of the chief's so that we shouldn't run away before daybreak. Finally we decided to believe the soldier because he was always very friendly to us, helped us carry food to our brothers at the fortress and even used to bring a long piece of white bread for the sick.

No matter what, the relationship between Jews and Germans remained strange at best: "Regardless of how friendly a German became with a Jew, awareness that one had absolute power over the other made such an association seem unnatural."

=== Individual executions ===
The German authorities enforced discipline in the Daugavpils Ghetto by hanging people who were perceived as violating their many rules:

One Sunday, when no one was going to work, an order was issued. Panic broke out once more. What now? We were all out in the yard when an announcement was made. We were terrified. The announcement was: 'You are about to witness what happens to a woman who wants to hide her Jewishness.' A beautiful blonde woman was brought in with a noose attached to her neck and publicly hanged. Her crime? She was found walking in the street with her shawl covering her yellow star.

A Jewish Ghetto police force enforced these rules. On at least one occasion, the police chief, one Pasternak, in early 1942, carried out a hanging, although it was perceived that he was reluctant to do so. In that case, the body of the executed woman, Mina Gittelson, whose crime was walking on the sidewalk and not in the street, and not wearing the Jewish badge, was left hanging for three days. Another source says that she had resisted the advances of the manager at the hotel where she worked, and he pressed the charges of illegal trading against her in retaliation. Also executed was 48-year-old Chaya Mayerova (other sources give her name as Meyorvich and Mejerow), who was shot before the assembled ghetto inhabitants for exchanging a piece of cloth for two kilograms of flour.

=== Sealing of the ghetto ===
A few days after the November massacre, the ghetto was closed, or in the bureaucratic term, "quarantined". This meant that the few people who were authorized to leave the ghetto to work in the city could no longer do so. This cut off their ability to smuggle in food. People died of hunger. Typhus epidemics broke out in December 1941 and in February 1942, killing additional occupants.

== November shootings ==
By the end of September 1941, the Nazis had killed about 30,000 Jews in Latvia, mostly in small towns. Three large population centers of Jews still remained, at Riga, Liepāja, and Daugavpils. From November 7 to 9, 1941, the Germans killed most of the remaining Jews in the Daugavpils Ghetto. The number of victims is in some dispute. Valdis Lumans gives a total of 3,000. Professor Ezergailis accepts the Nazi figure of 1,134, but this was based on a source which apparently refers to shootings on a single day - November 9, 1941. The shootings in this case, of about 3,000 people, were committed by the Arājs commando under German supervision, and may have been intended as a trial run for the much larger Rumbula massacre near Riga on November 30 and December 8, 1941. A survivor who was working in the ghetto hospital at the time later described the scene:

Outside, meanwhile, a devil's dance was taking place. There was shooting from all directions and nobody knew whose hour would strike in a minute or two. Suddenly, a nurse ran in out of breath and told everyone in the hospital that the commandant of the ghetto was coming here with some bandits to search for people who were hiding [.] * * * His shouts could be heard from a few rooms away. He threw the sick ones off their beds and looked for victims and told his gang to take them down into the yard. Those who can't walk are immediately shot in the yard. He was able to do this. His hand didn't even tremble.

A few people were able to survive by hiding in locations, including latrine wells, within the old fortress. Others were hidden in the hospital by the nurses, at mortal risk to themselves. In the four months from July to November 1941, the Nazis killed at least 15,000 Jews in Daugavpils. Of the several thousand people in the ghetto, only about 900 remained alive after the November shootings. Following the November massacre, a number of Jews with work permits were stationed (kasierniert or "barracked") outside the ghetto at the larger older fortress, sometimes called the citadel, on the north side of the Daugava River. Here they performed various labor services for the German army, and although they were not paid and food was scarce, they were treated better than the Jews who were confined to the ghetto. Because the citadel was under the administration of the German army, Latvian auxiliary police units were not seen.

== Associated German and Latvian units ==
The following units of the German army were associated with the Daugavpils ghetto or the administration of forced labor:

- Army Barracks Administration (Heeresunterkunft Verwaltung) No. 322. This organization was responsible for supervising Jews working in warehouses and workshops unloading, cleaning, sorting and repairing the uniforms of wounded German soldiers.
- Army Barracks Administration (Heeresunterkunft Verwaltung) No. 200. Forty Jewish women worked for this organization, whose duties included cleaning the rooms of German officers.
- Army Construction Service Department (Heeresbaudienststelle) No. 100.

== May 1 liquidation ==
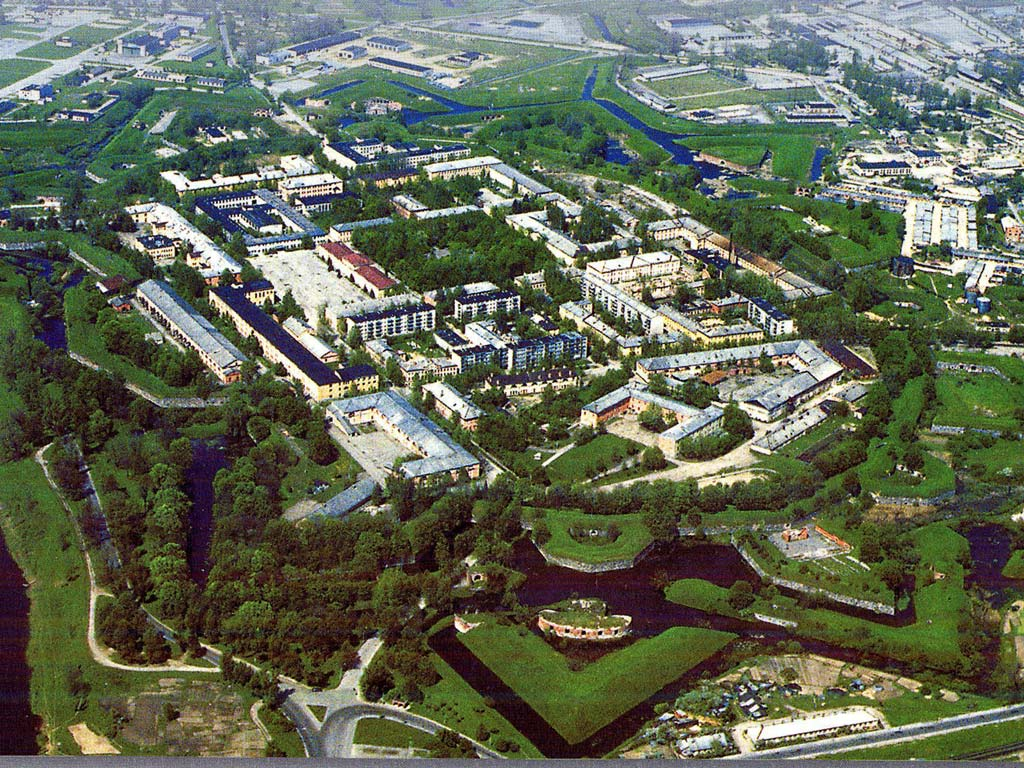
Modern aerial view of the Daugavpils citadel, showing the huge size of the obsolete star fort. While a few Jews were housed here, most of them in the Daugavpils Ghetto were incarcerated across the Daugava River in a much smaller outpost of this fortress.

On May 1, 1942, there were about 1,500 survivors in the Griva fortress/ghetto. Rudolf Lange, commander of the SD in Latvia, gave an order to Tabbert to liquidate the ghetto. Tabbert's men, and the Arājs commando, entered the ghetto in the morning after the working Jews had been marched out to the job sites. The Nazis conducted another "selection" that day, killing the great majority of Jews in the ghetto. One source states there were 375 survivors of the May 1 selection. Others state that of the Jews in the old fortress on the west side of the river, only one or two survived May 1. The May 1 selection followed the pattern of assembling the people to be executed, then marching them out to the Pogulianka Forest, where they were all shot and shoved into pre-dug mass graves. According to Iwens, who was at the citadel, and heard the story a few days later:

The Latvian auxiliaries went wild ... They threw old and sick people through second floor windows, shot those who refused to leave their rooms, and killed some of the very small children by cracking their heads against the concrete walls of the buildings. Even when the columns were assembled for departure, shots were fired into the mass of people.

Extraordinary brutality accompanied the May 1 killings. Among other things, the Nazis executed the older children in the ghetto itself by lining them up against a wall and shooting them. Eyewitness Maja Zarch, quoted in Gilbert, stated the following:

Walking through the gates we saw puddles of blood, broken bottles, and chairs strewn all over the place ... We walked on, only to see sights that defy any description. Children's bodies lay around, torn in half with the heads smashed in.

Following the May 1 shootings, of the 16,000 Jews in Daugavpils at the time the city fell to the Germans, there remained alive about 250 working in the citadel and 180 to 200 who were working in the city. There were only "a couple" of small Jewish children left alive. (Another source says 1,000 inmates were left in the ghetto.)

== Transfer to Kaiserwald ==
In late October 1943, there were still a few Jews housed in the Citadel who were working for the German army. On October 28, the Nazis and Latvian auxiliaries rounded up these people and transferred them to the Kaiserwald concentration camp. By this time, some of the Jews had managed to find or buy arms, and there was resistance to this action. Others killed their family members and then themselves to prevent being taken. A few escaped or hid, some with the help of at least two German soldiers, one named Liederman, the other Bruendl. A very small number (said to be 26 total), were permitted to stay on in the Citadel to work for the German army. On December 4, 1943, the Latvia police arrested these last Jews, leaving only three survivors who were still in hiding in the Citadel.

== Number of victims ==
The precise number of victims is not clear. Iwens estimated there were 16,000 Jews living in Daugavpils and only 100 survived the Nazi occupation. Iwens does not draw a distinction between total deaths in the early shootings, the ghetto and the Kaiserwald concentration camp. Ezergailis calculates that about 28,000 Jews lived in Daugavpils and the Latgale district when the Nazi occupation began. Of these the Nazis killed about 20,000, of which 13,000 died in Daugavpils, and 7,000 in the smaller towns in the district.
