= Joachim Hamann =

SS officer (1913–1945)

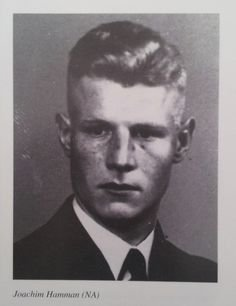
Joachim Hamann

Joachim Hamann (18 May 1913 in Kiel – 13 July 1945 in Heikendorf) was an officer of the Einsatzkommando 3, a killing unit of Einsatzgruppe A, responsible for tens of thousands of Jewish deaths in Lithuania. Hamann organized and commanded Rollkommando Hamann, a small mobile killing unit composed of 8–10 Germans and several dozen Lithuanians from the 3rd Company, Lithuanian TDA Battalion.

== Biography ==
Hamann was of Baltic German parentage.

=== Interwar ===
Trained as a chemist, he had difficulties finding a job due to the Great Depression. He joined the SA in August 1931, the Nazi Party in December 1932, and the SS in July 1938.

=== World War II ===
He served in the Luftwaffe during the invasion of Poland and Battle of France as a paratrooper (Fallschirmjäger). He returned to Berlin where he joined the SS and completed training courses. In March 1941, he was promoted to SS-Obersturmführer (first lieutenant).

After the Nazi invasion of the Soviet Union, Hamann organized and commanded Rollkommando Hamann which killed at least 39,000 Jews in various locations across Lithuania and 9,102 people, almost all of whom were Jews, from the Daugavpils Ghetto. Hamann's superior Karl Jäger documented these killings in the Jäger Report. Nevertheless, Martin C. Dean estimates the death toll of Rollkommando Hamann as 60,000 Jews in Lithuania alone.

Hamann left Lithuania in October 1941 and continued his SS career. In 1942, Hamann participated in Operation Zeppelin, a scheme to recruit Soviet POWs for espionage behind Russian lines. From 1943 he worked at Amt IV of RSHA (Gestapo). He was involved in apprehending and executing suspected members of the 20 July plot to assassinate Hitler. He was appointed aide to Ernst Kaltenbrunner, director of the Reich Security Main Office.

=== Post-war ===
Two months after Germany's surrender Hamann committed suicide.
