= Lithuanian TDA Battalion =

Paramilitary units and Nazi collaborators

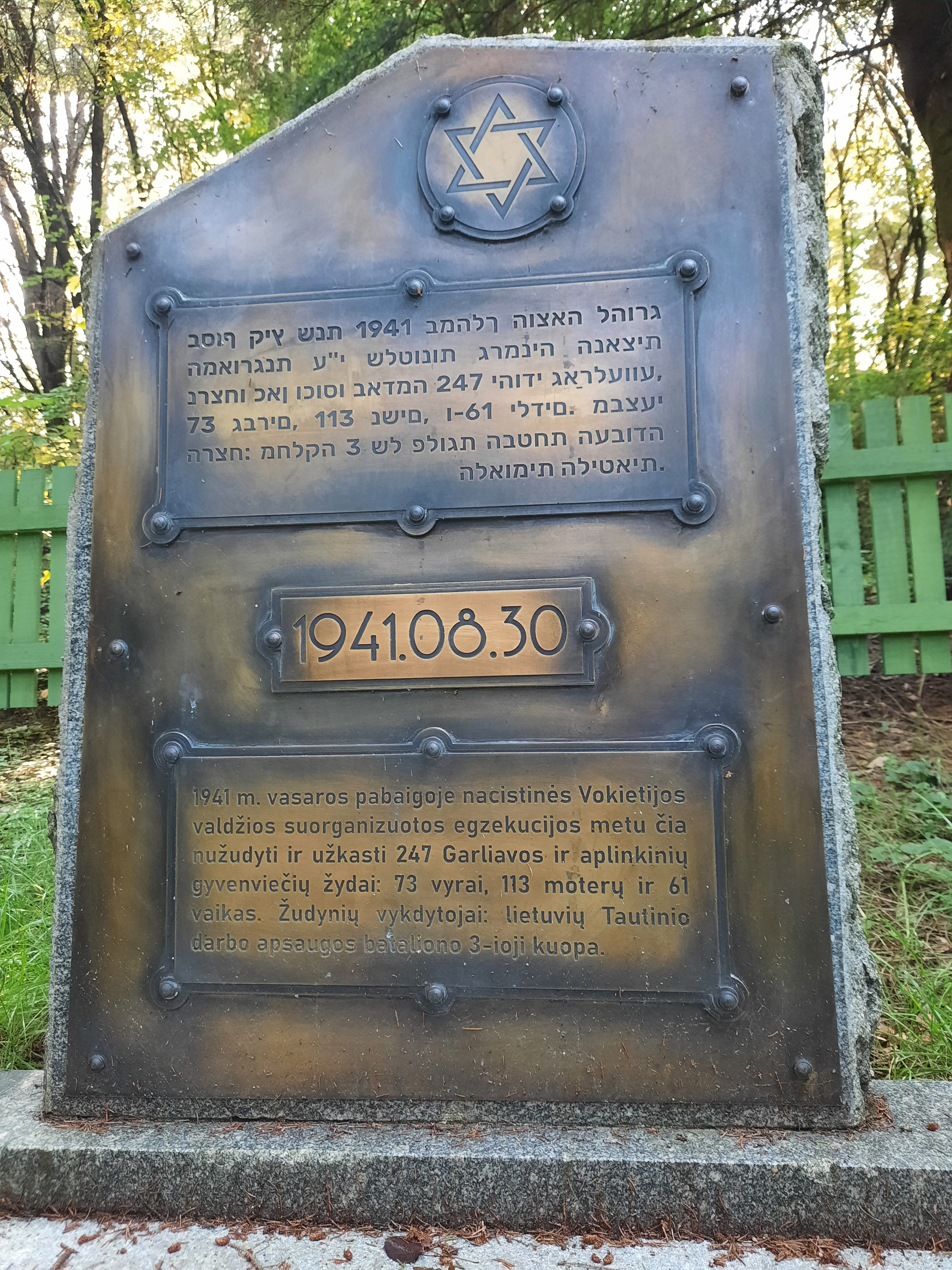
Memorial marking the 30 August 1941 massacre of 247 Jews of the Garliava region by the TDA.

The Lithuanian TDA Battalion (Lithuanian: Tautinio darbo apsaugos batalionas; lit. 'National labor service' (Note: There is no widely accepted English translation for Tautinio darbo apsaugos batalionas. Variations include: National Labor Service Battalion, Defence of National Labor Battalion, Battalions to Defend National Work, National Work Security, Defense of National Work, Lithuanian Battalion of National Work, Home Guard Battalion.)), or simply TDA, was a paramilitary battalion organized in June–August 1941 by the Provisional Government of Lithuania at the onset of Operation Barbarossa. Members of the TDA were known by many names such as Lithuanian auxiliaries, policemen, white-armbands, nationalists, rebels, partisans, resistance fighters or Schutzmannschaften. TDA was intended to be the basis for a future independent Lithuanian Army, but it was hijacked by the Nazis and reorganized into the Lithuanian Auxiliary Police Battalions.

The original TDA eventually became the 12th and the 13th Police Battalions. These two units took an active role in mass killings of the Jews in Lithuania and Belarus. According to the Jäger Report, the TDA battalion's members killed about 26,000 Jews between July and December 1941.

== Formation ==
The Provisional Government of Lithuania declared independence on June 23, 1941, just as Nazi Germany declared war on the Soviet Union and invaded Soviet-occupied Lithuania. Lithuanians hoped to restore the independent Lithuania that existed before the Soviet occupation or at least gain some autonomy from Nazi Germany. In an effort to re-establish the Lithuanian Army, the Provisional Government announced the formation of the TDA in Kaunas on June 28. Plans for such a formation had been made as early as March 24, 1941. The TDA wore a white armband with TDA in black letters on their sleeves. Andrius Butkūnas became the first commander of the newly formed battalion.

The formation's original goals were to protect strategic objects like bridges or railways, guard Soviet prisoners of war, establish general order in Kaunas and its vicinity. By July 4, 724 men, mostly former Lithuanian soldiers and partisans fighting in the June Uprising against the retreating Soviets, responded to the announcement and signed up for the battalion. By the end of July, seven companies had formed. At the time of its formation TDA was the only armed and organized group in Kaunas and Nazi authorities took advantage of it.

== Activities ==
=== Executions of Jews ===
According to a July 6 report by Karl Jäger, commander of Einsatzgruppe A, two companies of TDA were assigned to duties related to mass murders of Jews: one was to guard and execute Jews at the Seventh Fort of the Kaunas Fortress and another was assigned to the Einsatzkommando. According to extensive post-war investigations by Soviet authorities, as executions of Jews grew in number, more companies of TDA were involved in the murders. In light of such developments TDA started losing members: between July 5 and July 11, 117 members resigned. Captain Bronius Kirkila, commander of the 1st Company, which was especially frequently involved in the executions, committed suicide on July 12.^{:93,132} The 3rd Company was assigned to the notorious Rollkommando Hamann commanded by Joachim Hamann and Bronius Norkus. The unit committed mass murders of Jews in the countryside. On August 30, 1941, according to German records, they shot 662 people in Ariogala; 207 men, 260 women and 195 children who were told they were being transported to Palestine. Based on the Jäger Report, members of TDA (mostly the 3dr Company) murdered about 26,000 Jews between July and December 1941.

=== Reorganizations ===
During the night between July 23 and 24, some members of the TDA were involved in an attempted coup against the Provisional Government. The coup, organized by members of the Iron Wolf and supported by the German Gestapo, succeeded in replacing the leadership of the TDA. Iron Wolf now could promote or dismiss various members of TDA, and Commander Butkūnas was replaced by Kazys Šimkus.

The Provisional Government was dissolved under Nazi pressure on August 5, 1941. The following day Franz Lechthaler took command of all police units, including the TDA. On August 7, when TDA had 703 members, Lechthaler ordered the battalion reorganized into two battalions of auxiliary police or Hilfspolizei (Lithuanian: Pagalbinės policijos tarnyba or PPT) and renamed accordingly. During August three more battalions of PPT were formed. In October these five battalions were renamed to security battalions (Lithuanian: apsaugos batalionas).

=== Liquidation and persecution ===
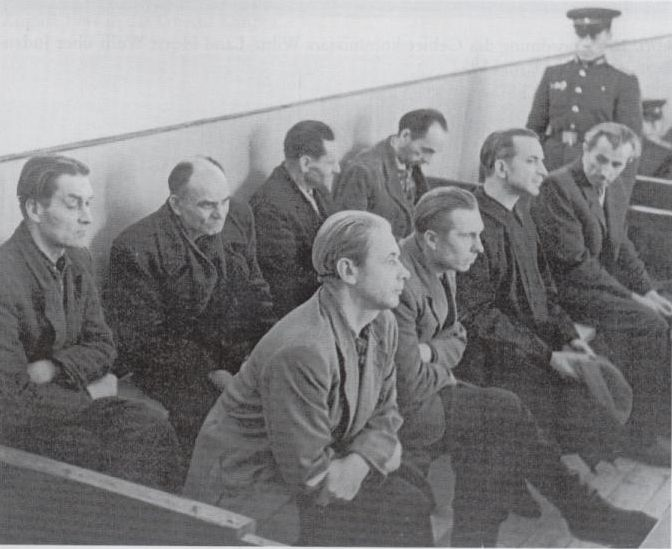
Eight members of TDA on trial in 1961 (found guilty and executed)

In December, the five battalions were reorganized again:

- 1st Battalion - became the 13th,
- 2nd – 12th,
- 3rd – 11th Battalions of Lithuanian Self-Defence Units (Lithuanian: Lietuvių savisaugos dalinys).

In 1942 the new 13th Battalion was reassigned to combat Soviet partisans near Pskov and Kalinin and retreated with the losing Wehrmacht in 1944. Its members were captured by Red Army, or hid in Lithuanian forests. Many members were persecuted by Soviet authorities for their anti-Soviet activities. Some were executed, others imprisoned in gulags. Soviet investigations continued until 1979, when the last execution was carried out in Minsk.
