= Ablinga =

- Village
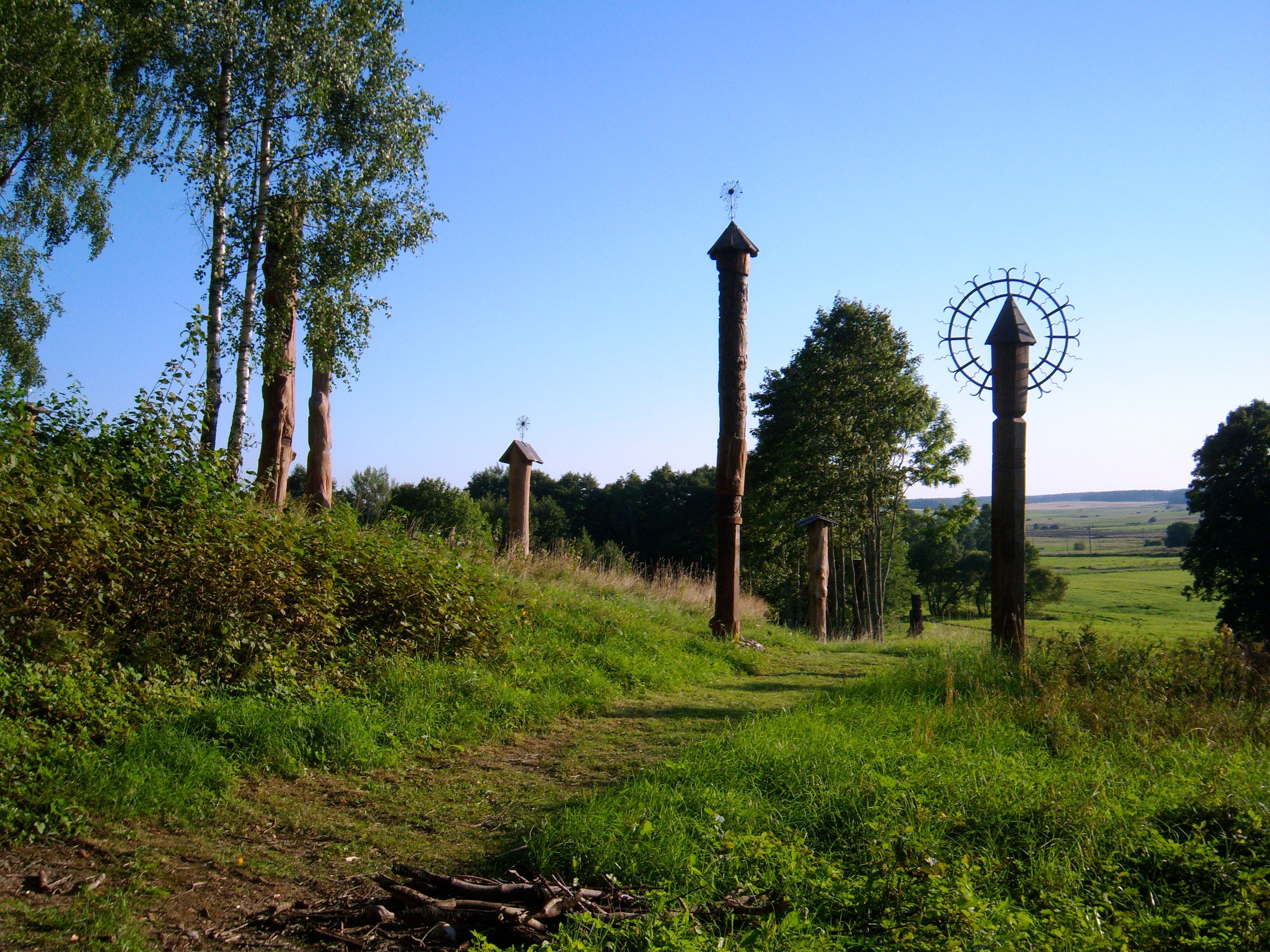
- Wooden sculptures in Ablinga

- Location of Ablinga
- Coordinates: 55°43′56″N 21°42′02″E
- Country: Lithuania
- Ethnographic region: Lithuania Minor
- County: Klaipėda County
- Municipality: Klaipėda District Municipality
- Eldership: Endriejavas eldership

Population (2011)
  - Total: 7
- Time zone: UTC+2 (EET)
  - Summer (DST): UTC+3 (EEST)

Ablinga is a village in Lithuania, located 48 km (30 mi) east of Klaipėda. First mentioned in the 14th century, it had 87 residents in 1923, 97 in 1950, 57 in 1970 and 20 in 1979. The 2011 census recorded village's population of 7 residents.

On June 23, 1941, the second day of the Nazi invasion of Soviet Union, Nazi punitive squadron executed 42 villagers from Ablinga and nearby Žvaginiai (28 men and 14 women) and burned down their houses. The motives for this mass killing are not clear. In 1972, in memory of the massacre a sculpture park was established at the Žvaginiai hill fort. The ensemble consists of 30 wooden statues, carved by various Lithuanian folk artists (see dievdirbys) and measuring some 6 metres (20 ft) in height. The memorial, as the first monumental display of folk sculptures, was an important development in revival and modernization of the traditional Lithuanian art of wood carving and inspired other similar sculpture parks.
