= Rollkommando Hamann =

1941 Nazi killing squad in Lithuania

Rollkommando Hamann (Lithuanian: skrajojantis būrys) was a small mobile unit that committed mass murders of Lithuanian Jews in the countryside in July–October 1941, with an estimated death toll of at least 60,000 Jews. The unit was also responsible for many murders in Latvia from July through August 1941. At the end of 1941 the destruction of Lithuanian Jewry was effectively accomplished by Hamann's unit in the countryside, by the Ypatingasis būrys in the Ponary massacre, and by the Tautinio Darbo Apsaugos Batalionas (TDA) in the Ninth Fort in Kaunas. In about six months an estimated 80% of all Lithuanian Jews were killed. The remaining few were spared for use as a labor force and concentrated in urban ghettos, mainly the Vilna and Kaunas Ghettos.

== Organization ==
The group consisted of 8–10 Germans from Einsatzkommando 3, commanded by SS-Obersturmführer Joachim Hamann, and several dozen Lithuanians from the TDA's 3rd Company, commanded by Bronius Norkus. The unit had no permanent structure and was called for ad hoc missions in various towns in Lithuania. While Bubnys indicates Hamann primarily handed out assignments while not participating himself, post-war testimony indicates Hamann told others of his direct participation. The Jäger Report documents mass executions carried out by the unit in 54 locations across Lithuania. From July 13 to August 22, 1941, the commando operated out of Daugavpils, Latvia. During this time, the commando murdered 9,102 people, almost all of whom were Jews, from the Daugavpils Ghetto.

== Operations ==
Usually the unit arrived after the local Jews were already rounded up and gathered in a more secluded area, usually a forest or a distant field, by local Nazi authorities and Lithuanian local collaborators. Sometimes small, temporary ghettos were set up for gathering the Jews from several nearby towns. Jews selected for executions were marched to the location, usually about 4–5 kilometres (2.5–3.1 mi) away from where they lived, and shot. Sometimes men were shot first, while women and children were executed towards the end of 1941. The corpses would be disposed of in pits dug in advance and the loot (clothes and other property of those killed) would be divided among the perpetrators. Such killings became known as "actions" (German: Aktion, Yiddish: Aktsiye).
