= Vytautas the Great War Museum =

Museum in Kaunas, Lithuania

- Vytauto Didžiojo karo muziejus
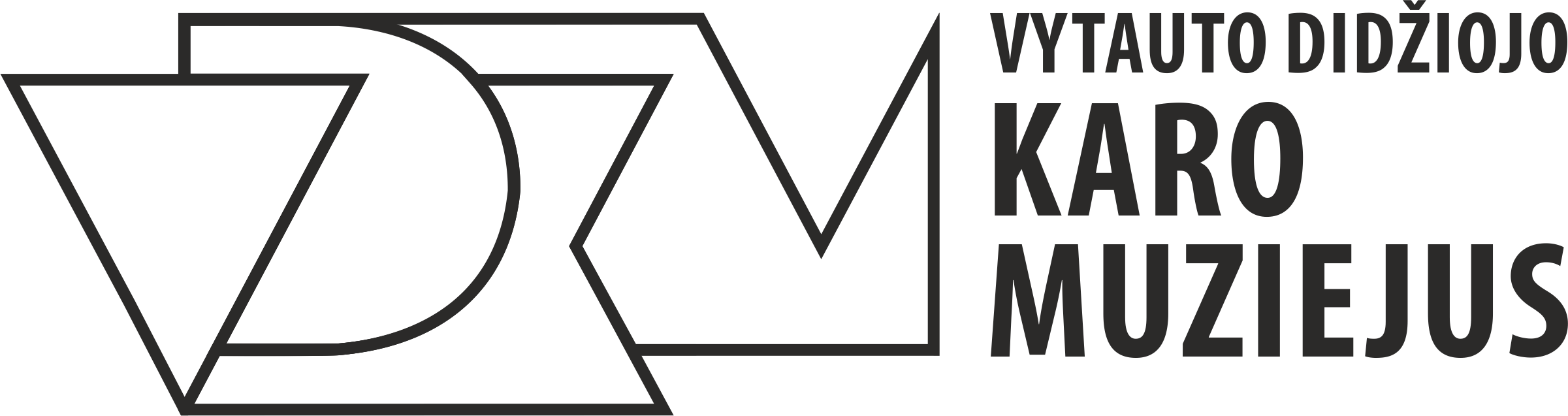

- Vytautas the Great War Museum in 2022
- Established: 1921
- Location: Kaunas, Lithuania
- Coordinates: 54°54′00″N 23°54′43″E
- Website: www.vdkaromuziejus.lt/en/

UNESCO World Heritage Site
- Official name: Modernist Kaunas: Architecture of Optimism, 1919-1939
- Type: Cultural
- Criteria: iv
- Designated: 2023 (45th session)
- Reference no.
- UNESCO region: Europe

The Vytautas the Great War Museum (Lithuanian: Vytauto Didžiojo karo muziejus) is a museum in Kaunas, Lithuania. It was built in Art Deco and early functionalism style.

Originally it was established in 1921 by Vladas Nagevičius but later it was decided to move to a larger location. A part of the new museum was opened in 1930, at the 500th anniversary of Vytautas the Great, Grand Duke of Lithuania, the namesake of the museum.

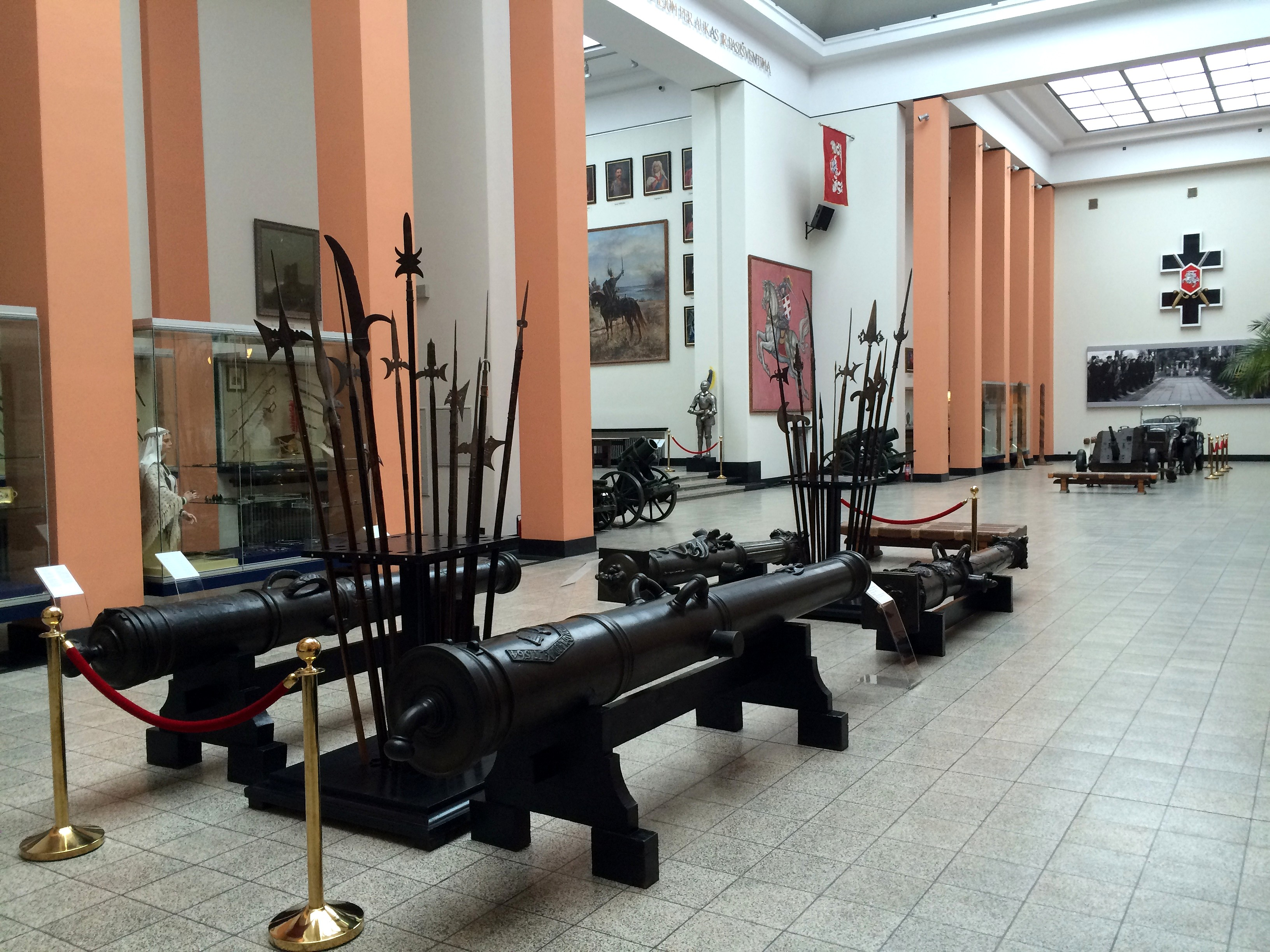
Exposition inside the museum

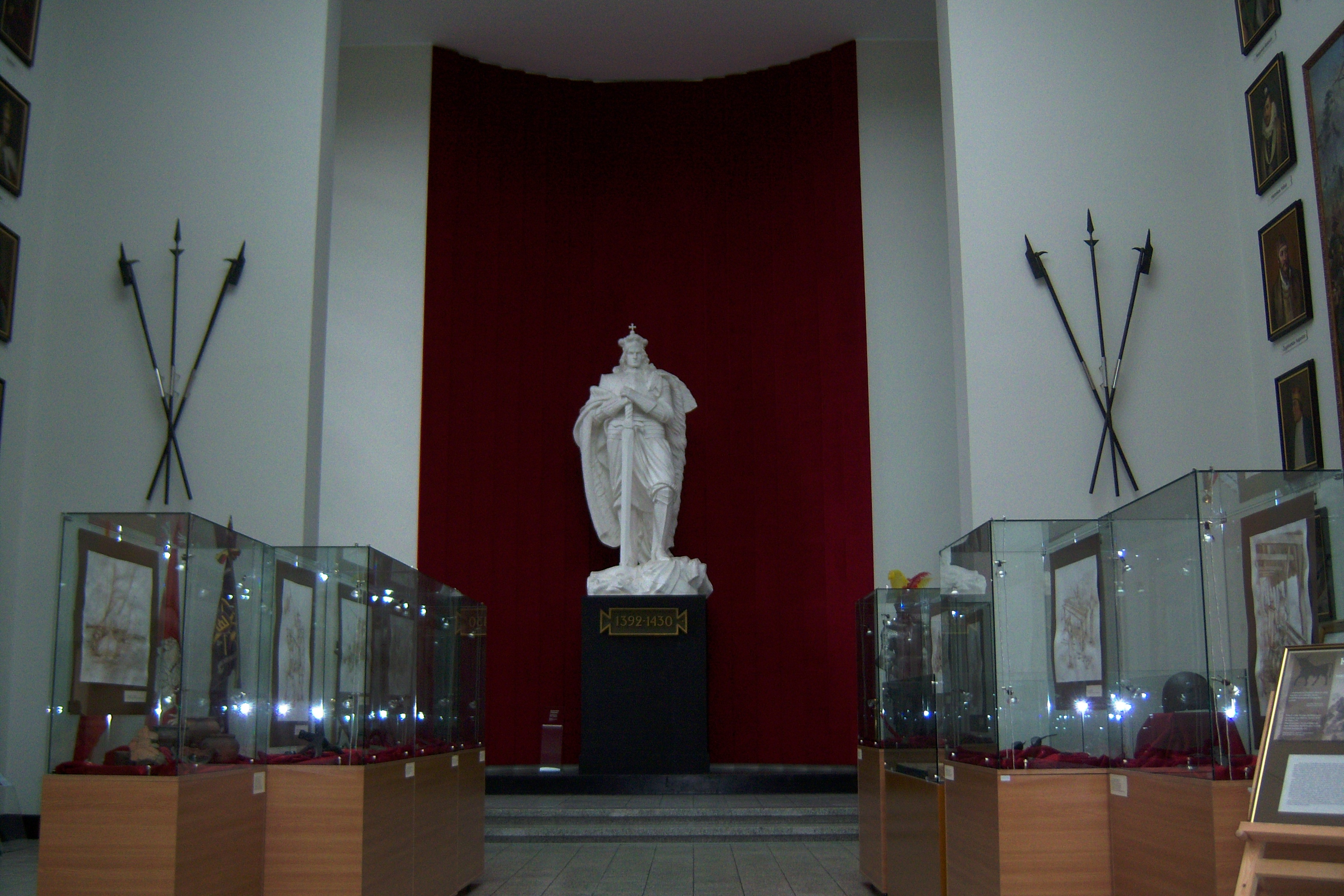
Original plaster of the statue of Vytautas the Great in the Museum

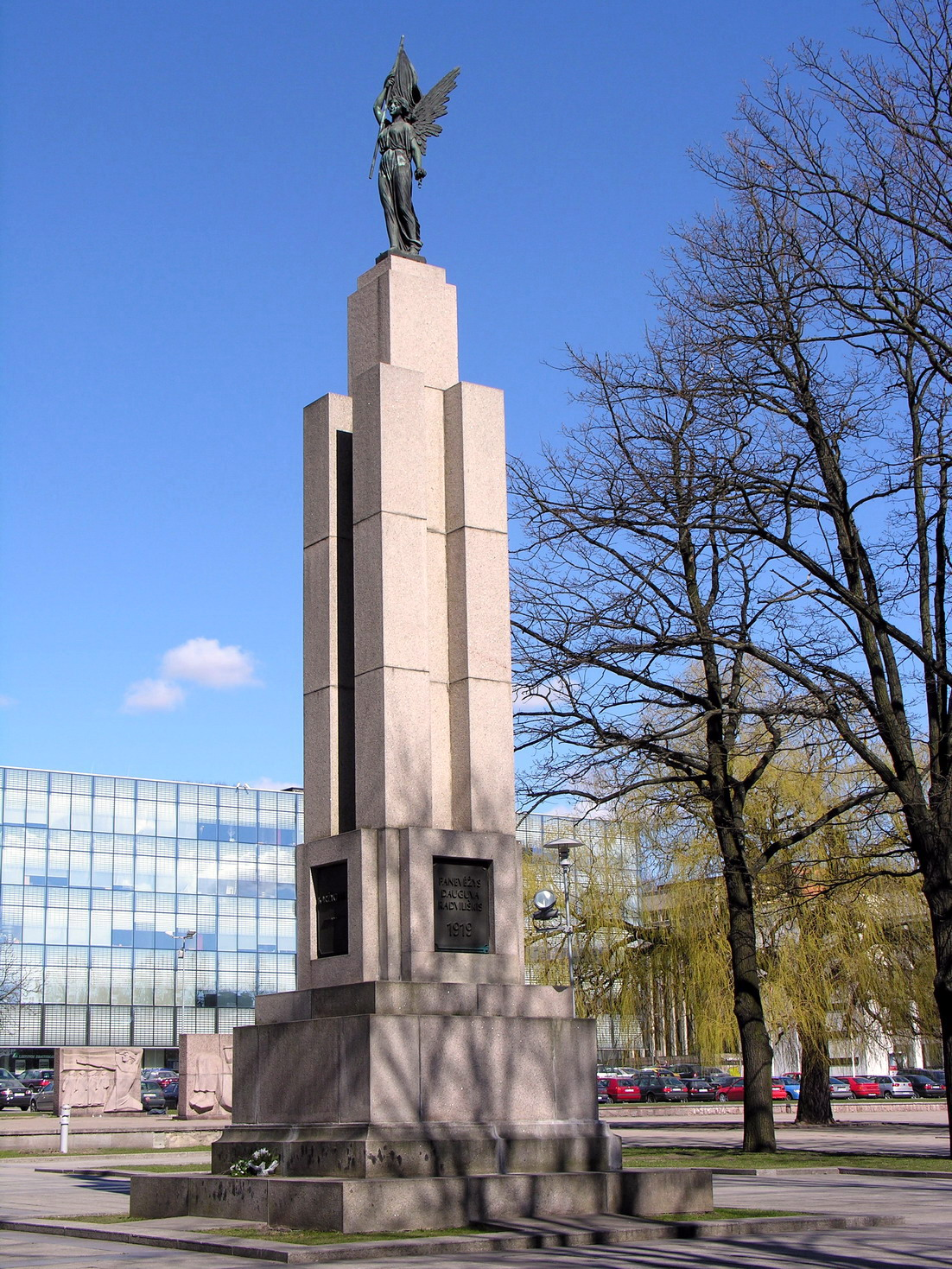
Freedom statue in the square of the Vytautas the Great War Museum

The finished museum was opened on 16 February 1936. Museum displays historical artefacts pertaining to Lithuania and Kaunas from prehistoric times to the present day, including a large collection of historical weapons. There are expositions dedicated to the military skills of the Grand Duchy of Lithuania, Vytautas the Great Chapel, collections of weapons, firearms, ammunition, army uniforms of various states, defense of the Kaunas Fortress in 1915, and others. The airplane Lituanica, on which Steponas Darius and Stasys Girėnas flew across the Atlantic Ocean in 1933, is on display and remains a popular exhibition.

In the great hall of the museum there are copies of 17th century cannons. There is also a comprehensive collection of 18th century pistols.

Statues of Lithuanian national renaissance figures, and the Tomb of the Unknown Soldier and eternal flame, are located in the square in front of the museum. During the time of the First Lithuanian Republic (1918–1940), when Kaunas was the temporary capital of Lithuania, national holidays were celebrated in the square. The plaque commemorating book smugglers and distributors Knygnešių sienelė is also situated alongside.

The 35-bell Kaunas Carillon (range from as1 to as4) in the tower of the Vytautas the Great War Museum was completed in Belgium in 1935. Bell music from the tower was first played in 1937. Regular carillon concerts began in 1956. The first carillonists of the Kaunas Carillon were Lithuanian composers Viktoras Kuprevičius and his son Giedrius Kuprevičius. The carillon was restored by the Royal Eijsbouts bell foundry in Asten, Netherlands, in 2005–2006. After the restoration, the carillon has 49 bells and a new keyboard. Every day at midday, the Lithuanian war time song Oi, neverk motušėle (Don't Cry, Mother) is played.

The crypt to Those Perished for the Freedom of Lithuania was constructed in 1938. The crypt was vandalized and destroyed during the time of Soviet occupation. After the restoration the crypt inside covered with black marble was opened again in 1998.

The 90th anniversary of the museum in 2011 was marked by the opening of two new galleries: Warfare in Pre-Historic Times and History of Warfare of the Lithuanian Grand Duchy of the 13th–17th centuries.

The museum shares its building with the M. K. Čiurlionis National Art Museum and is located in Vienybė Square. The museum and its surroundings are depicted on the 20 litas banknote.

The museum garden has more than ten statues of Lithuanian military chiefs and cultural characters who influenced Lithuania in 19th and 20th century.

In 2015, the building was one of 44 objects in Kaunas to receive the European Heritage Label.
