= Kuprevičius =

- Lithuanian surname
- m.: Kuprevičius
- f.: (unmarried): Kuprevičiutė
- f.: (married): Kuprevičienė
- Related names: Russian:Kuprevich; Polish:Kuprewicz

Kuprevičius is a Lithuanian language family name. The surname corresponds to Polish "Kuprewicz" and East Slavic "Kuprevich".

The surname may refer to:

- Giedrius Kuprevičius (born 1944), Lithuanian composer, music educator
- Viktoras Kuprevičius (1901–1992), Lithuanian composer, music educator
- Mykolas Kuprevičius (1864–1932), Lithuanian doctor
