= Kaunas Carillon =

- Kauno kariljonas
- Façade of the tower of Kaunas Carillon in 2018
- Interactive map of the Kaunas Carillon area

General information
- Status: Completed
- Type: Carillon
- Architectural style: Modernist
- Location: Naujamiestis, Kaunas, Lithuania
- Coordinates: 54°53′59″N 23°54′41″E
- Inaugurated: 1937
- Renovated: 2006
- Owner: Ministry of National Defence of the Republic of Lithuania, Vytautas the Great War Museum

Height
- Height: 32 m (105 ft)

Design and construction
- Architect: Vladimiras Dubeneckis (tower)

UNESCO World Heritage Site
- Official name: Modernist Kaunas: Architecture of Optimism, 1919–1939
- Type: Cultural
- Criteria: iv
- Designated: 2023 (45th session)
- Reference no.
- UNESCO region: Europe

The Kaunas Carillon (Lithuanian: Kauno kariljonas) is a carillon in the tower of the Vytautas the Great War Museum in Kaunas, Lithuania. The carillon officially belongs to the Ministry of National Defence of the Republic of Lithuania and Vytautas the Great War Museum. In the interwar period, it was the only carillon in Lithuania, however currently four other carillons are also in Klaipėda, Vilnius, Šakiai, and Gelgaudiškis Manor.

The tower where the Kaunas Carillon is located is 32 metres (105 ft) tall and has an observation deck. The total weight of the carillon's 49 bells is 4,334 kilograms (9,555 lb). The largest bell weighs 751 kilograms (1,656 lb) and was funded by the Lithuanian President Valdas Adamkus and his wife Alma Adamkienė. Music played on the Kaunas Carillon can be heard within a 3-kilometre (1.9 mi) radius.

== History ==
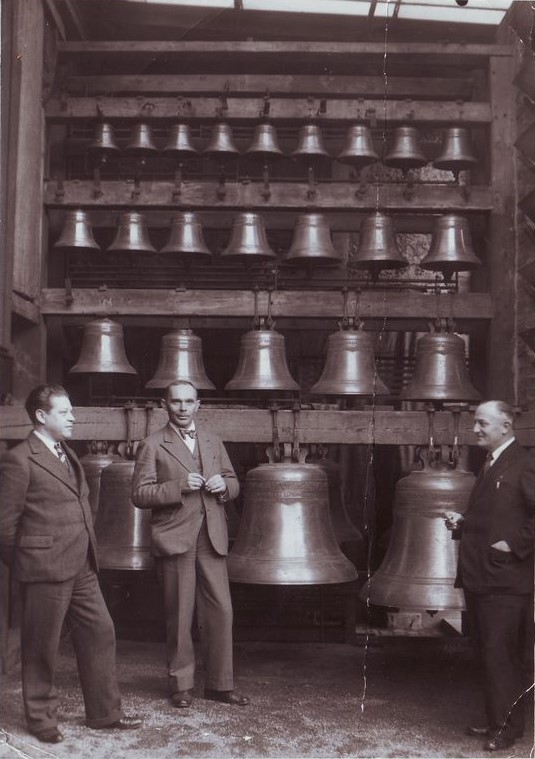
Juozas Tallat-Kelpša in Brussels selecting bells for the carillon in 1935

In 1933, a modern carillon was commissioned in a bellfoundry in Mechelen, Belgium, for the Vytautas the Great War Museum complex in Lithuania's temporary capital Kaunas. In 1935, the 35 bells and other components were cast by the foundry of Marcel Michiels Jr. in Tournai, Belgium, and transported to the Lithuanian port city Klaipėda. In 1937, under the auspices of general Vladas Nagevičius and composer Juozas Tallat-Kelpša, the carillon was installed in the tower of the Vytautas the Great War Museum and replaced the previous 9-bell system. Since 15 February 1937, the carillon's bells are called the bells of battles (Kovų varpai). For example, the first bell of the carillon was given the name of Lithuania's capital Vilnius (at the time controlled by Poland), the twelfth bell was dedicated to the fighter of Vilnius (Vilniaus kovotojas), the ninth bell was baptized with the name of the Battle of Giedraičiai, the tenth bell was dedicated to the volunteers of the Lithuanian Armed Forces during the Lithuanian Wars of Independence (Kūrėjas savanoris), and the thirteenth bell was dedicated to the participants of the Klaipėda Revolt (Klaipėdos vaduotojas, literally vaduotojas means a person who liberates). In 1938, a knight sculpture was added to the tower exterior, which was created by the sculptor Juozas Mikėnas from cartridge cases collected from fields during the Lithuanian Wars of Independence and cartridge cases from warehouses of the intendant. Until the Second World War, patriotic Lithuanian music was played on the Kaunas Carillon during flag ceremonies (e.g. Lithuanians we are born by Stasys Šimkus).

After the Soviet occupation of Lithuania, the flag of Lithuania was lowered from the tower of Kaunas Carillon on 1 August 1940 and the playing of music on the carillon ceased. The only brief exception was on 23 June 1941 when, during the June Uprising, the Red Army was expelled from Kaunas. During the German occupation of Lithuania in 1942, the tower's knight sculpture was torn down and destroyed.

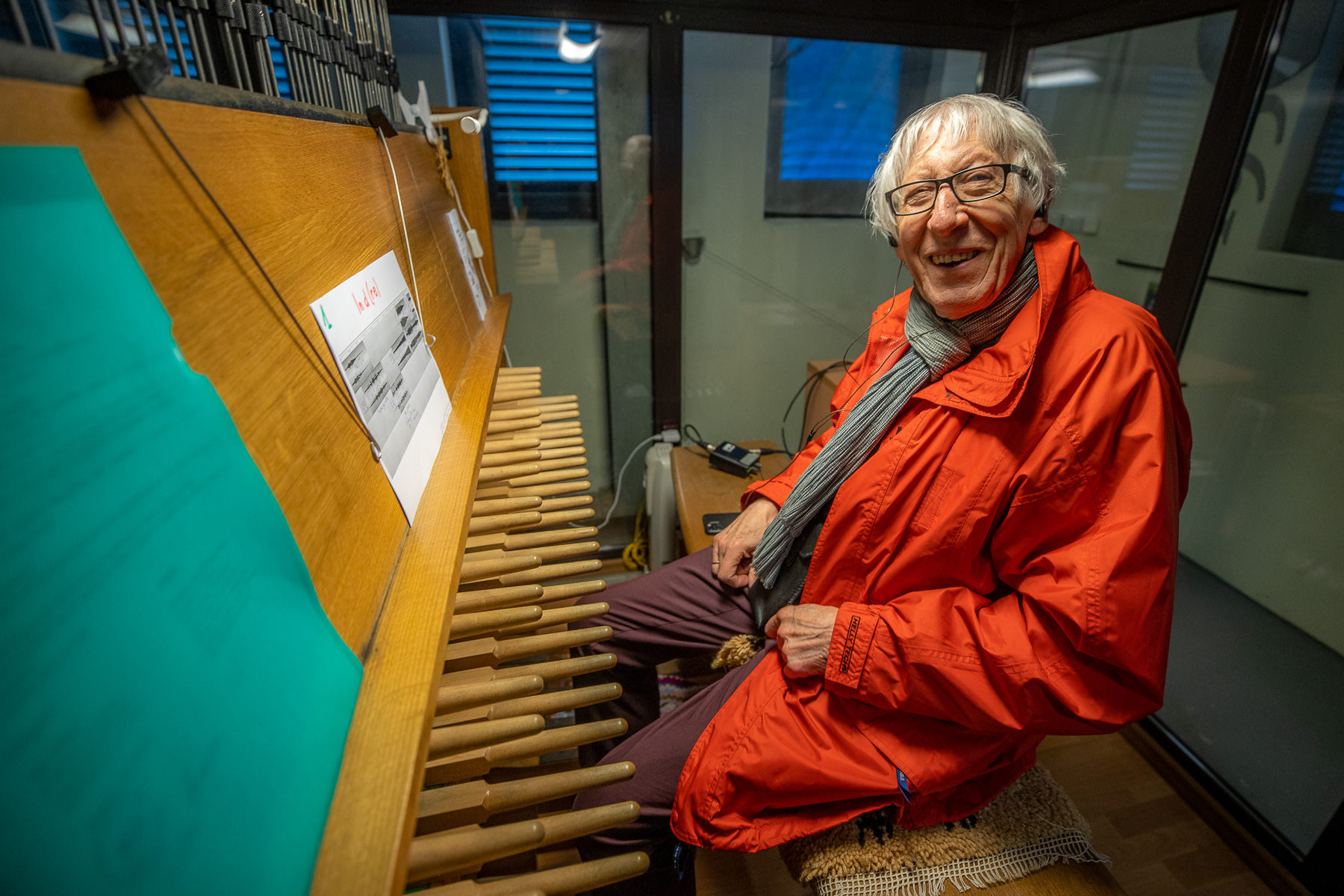
Giedrius Antanas Kuprevičius at Kaunas Carillon in 2023

After the Soviet re-occupation of Lithuania in 1944, playing the carillon was resumed only in 1956 by composer Viktoras Kuprevičius and his son Giedrius Antanas Kuprevičius, and since 1957 the playing of music became regular. In the Soviet period the Kaunas Carillon was the only carillon in Eastern Europe (excluding East Germany) and with its Belgian-made bells the music was played daily. During visits to the Lithuanian Soviet Socialist Republic, political leaders of the Warsaw Pact including Erich Honecker, János Kádár, and Edward Gierek had listened to performances on the carillon.

Following the re-establishment of the State of Lithuania in 1990, the carillon began playing every weekend. During a major restoration by the Royal Eijsbouts bell foundry of Asten, Netherlands, in 2005–2006, an additional 14 bells and a new keyboard were installed. After the restoration, the carillon has 49 bells.

Commemoration of the January Events in 2010

On 16 February 2015, a new knight sculpture was installed on the tower exterior—at 28 metres (92 ft) up—and was unveiled by commemorating the anniversary of the Act of Independence of Lithuania. The new knight sculpture—2.7 metres (8 ft 10 in) tall and weighing 200 kilograms (440 lb)—is made from copper and was created by the sculptor Jonas Malinauskas, based on a project by the sculptor Juozas Šlivinskas. The knight sculpture restoration which cost 26,000 Lithuanian litas was funded by the Kaunas City Municipality and Kaunas residents' donations, while the Ministry of National Defence of the Republic of Lithuania gifted cannon shell cases which weighed several hundred kilograms.

Since 2017, every year in September the International Kaunas Carillon Music Festival is held with Lithuanian and international carillonists (e.g. from the Netherlands, Belgium, Poland, and Japan).

On 27 February 2022, the carillon played Ukrainian music to demonstrate support for Ukraine just a few days after the beginning of the Russia's invasion. On 24 February 2024, the carillon once again played Ukrainian music to commemorate the 2nd anniversary of the invasion. Ukrainian refugees witnessed the performance.

== Liberty Bell ==
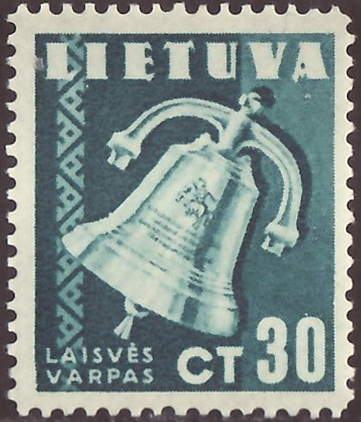
Stamp with the Liberty Bell, 1940

On the initiative of the Lithuanian American Jonas Bagdžiūnas-Borden and based on the American Liberty Bell the 500-kilogram (1,100 lb) Liberty Bell was cast in St. Louis, United States, in 1919. Below the coat of arms of Lithuania a text created by Bronius Kazys Balutis was written in Lithuanian on the Liberty Bell: "O skambink per amžius vaikams Lietuvos, kad laisvės nevertas kas negina jos" (English: Ring for the ages to the children of Lithuania that freedom is not worthy of those who do not defend it). The Lithuanian Americans gifted the Liberty Bell to Lithuania in 1920 and in 1922 it arrived in Lithuania. Since due to the Żeligowski's Mutiny it was not possible to hang the Liberty Bell in Gediminas' Tower in Lithuania's capital Vilnius (as requested by the Lithuanian Americans), the Liberty Bell was handed over to the Vytautas the Great War Museum in Kaunas.

The Liberty Bell is still hanging in the tower of Kaunas Carillon near the carillon's bells, but is not connected to its bells system.
