= Chervyen rural council =

Coordinates: 53°42′28″N 28°25′56″E

Chervyenski rural council is a lower-level subdivision (selsoviet) of Chervyen district, Minsk region, Belarus. Its administrative center is Chervyen.
