= Nezhevka, Belarus =

Nezhevka Нежаўка
- Location within Belarus
- Coordinates: 53°50′N 28°11′E
- Country Subdivision: Belarus
- Time zone: UTC+2 (EEST)
  - Summer (DST): UTC+3 (EEST)
- Area code: +375 17

Nezhevka (Belarusian: Нежаўка, Russian: Нежевка) is a village in the Chervyen District of Minsk Region, Belarus. It is close to the city of Smalyavichy and the Minsk International Airport.

== Geography ==
Latitude: 53.8333333°, Longitude: 28.1833333°

== See also ==
- Chervyen District
- Minsk Region
- Belarus
