= Ignas Končius =

Lithuanian physicist, ethnographer (1886-1975)

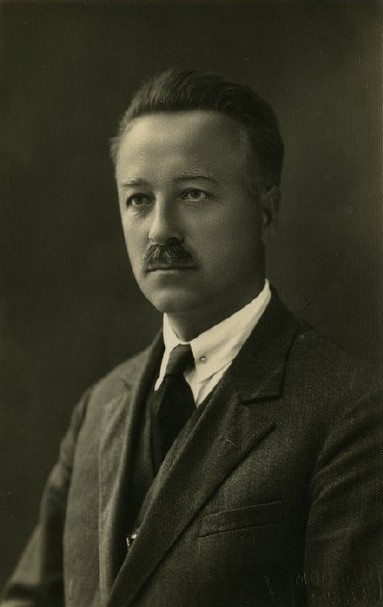
Ignas Končius in 1927

Ignas Končius (July 31, 1886 – February 19, 1975) was a Lithuanian physicist, ethnographer, and public figure, noted for his contributions to science, education, and the preservation of cultural heritage.

== Early life and education ==
Ignas Končius was born on July 31, 1886, in the village of Purvaičiai, Žarėnai district, Telšiai uezd, then part of the Kovno Governorate in the Russian Empire, to farmers Antanas Končius and Anastasija (née Saudargaitė) Končienė, in a family of five children. During the Lithuanian press ban, his father was involved in the illegal distribution of Lithuanian language books.

In 1903, he graduated from the Palanga progymnasium and in 1907 from the Liepāja Gymnasium. While at school, he participated in a secret student circle where he studied the Lithuanian language and Lithuanian history; he was also active among workers, promoting social ideas.

In 1907, he enrolled in the Faculty of Physics and Mathematics at Saint Petersburg University. During his studies, he was involved in Lithuanian student organizations, serving as chairman of the Lithuanian Student Society in 1910 and leading a Lithuanian research circle. That same year, he published his first astronomy-related article on Halley's Comet in the Lithuanian press.

Due to his father’s illness, he interrupted his studies for two years. Following his father’s death in 1911, he liquidated the family's farm and traveled across Samogitia—a region in northwestern Lithuania—documenting and photographing roadside crosses and shrines, work that later became foundational to his ethnographic research. He graduated from the university in 1913 with a degree in physics.

== Early career and World War I ==
After graduating, Končius worked as a teacher in Riga and, in 1914, was appointed a teacher of physics and mathematics at the Palanga Gymnasium, a seaside resort in Lithuania. That same year, he married Marija (née Kentraitė) Končienė.

With the outbreak of World War I, he evacuated to Võru, Estonia, together with a group of students and teachers from the Palanga Gymnasium. He later moved to Saint Petersburg, where until August 1915 he served as secretary of the Lithuanian Society for the Relief of War Victims. In 1915, his first son, Algirdas, was born in Saint Petersburg.

In early 1917, following the German occupation of Riga, the gymnasium was evacuated further east to Stavropol in the North Caucasus. Končius remained there until 1921, working at the Stavropol Agricultural Institute and establishing a branch of the Lithuanian Society for the Relief of War Victims. In 1920, his second son, Vytautas, was born in Stavropol.

== Academic career in Lithuania ==
In 1921, Končius returned to Lithuania and began teaching at the Dotnuva Agricultural and Forestry School, which in 1924 was reorganized into the Agricultural Academy. He continued to teach there until 1926 as a docent (associate professor). In 1925, he was elected secretary of the Academy’s Council of Professors. His son Jurgis was born in 1923, and his son Liudas in 1925.

In 1926, he moved to Kaunas, where he began teaching at the University of Lithuania (later Vytautas Magnus University). He served as docent and later professor (from 1933) in the Department of Experimental Physics, where he taught physics. He also lectured at the Higher Officers’ Courses in 1926–1927.

He held several important academic and administrative positions at Vytautas Magnus University:

- Head of the Department of Physics (1931–1939; 1941–1943)
- Director of the Faculty of Labor (1940–1941)
- Editor of the university’s Proceedings of Mathematics and Natural Sciences (1937–1939)
- Chairman of the Physics Terminology Commission (1930)
- Chairman of the Commission for the Reform of Agricultural Education (1939)

When Lithuania regained its capital, Vilnius, from Poland, the Lithuanian Ministry of Education appointed Končius to serve as acting head of Stephen Báthory University (Vilnius University), a post he held from November 1939 to January 1940.

== Ethnographic and cultural work ==
In addition to his academic career concentrating on physics, Končius carried out extensive ethnographic research, spanning between 1911 and 1940. He documented and photographed Samogitian crosses and roadside shrines, contributing to the preservation of Lithuanian folk art and cultural heritage.

As a member of the State Archaeological Commission (from 1931), he contributed to the development of legislation for the protection of historical monuments, supported the establishment of local history museums, and organized courses for collectors of ethnographic material. He also participated in ethnographic expeditions.

Končius was among the initiators of the establishment of the Kaunas Zoo and the Kretinga Museum. He also contributed to cultural journals such as Kultūra (“Culture”) and Visuomenė (“Society”). He was active in the Lithuanian Scout movement.

== War, arrest, and displacement ==
Following the Soviet occupation of Lithuania in 1940, Končius was arrested by Soviet authorities in May 1941, in connection with his son Liudas’s “anti-Soviet protest,” and imprisoned in Kaunas.

His son Liudas had been arrested for producing anti-Soviet leaflets calling for an independent Lithuania. During interrogation, Liudas was asked in Russian whether his father was aware of these activities; not understanding the question, he replied in the affirmative. On this basis, Končius was also arrested. Liudas was later released due to his age (15), while Končius was soon destined for execution.

Shortly thereafter, on the night of 22 June 1941, following the invasion of the USSR by Nazi Germany, he was transferred to Vilnius and then, together with other prisoners, to Minsk, Belarus. He survived the Minsk–Chervyen death march and escaped execution during the Chervyen massacre carried out by the NKVD.

He later returned to Kaunas. During the German occupation, he resumed his position as head of the Department of Physics at Vytautas Magnus University. He also served as chairman of the Supreme Committee of Mutual Aid, which provided assistance to the disabled, large families, and the families of concentration camp prisoners. He continued to work there until the university was closed by the German occupation authorities in March 1943.

He is reported to have been associated with Lithuanian intellectual circles that protested the arrest and deportation of members of the Lithuanian intelligentsia to the Stutthof concentration camp by the German occupation authorities.

In July 1944, as the Soviet Red Army approached, Končius fled to Germany with two of his sons, Liudas and Vytautas, while his other sons, Algirdas and Jurgis, remained in Lithuania with his wife.

He subsequently lived in displaced persons camps in Bayreuth, Eichstätt and Dillingen, and later in Wiesbaden, where he was elected to the Supreme Committee of the Lithuanian refugee community and was involved in organizing relief efforts for fellow refugees.

Archival records from his Displaced Persons (DP) registration indicate his stated wish “to return to Lithuania if it were a free and independent state.” A similar entry in his son Vytautas’s DP record reads: “I fear the terror of Bolshevik tyranny, which I know from personal experience.”

== Life in the United States ==
In 1949, Končius emigrated to the United States with his son Liudas and settled in Boston, Massachusetts. His other son Vytautas has already emigrated to the United States with his wife in 1947.

In December 1949, he began working at the Physics Research Laboratory at Tufts University, where he was employed until 1961.

While in the United States, he remained active in the Lithuanian émigré community and served as chairman of the board of the Academic Scout Movement (1947–1954). He also wrote his memoirs, and as a hobby, engaged in woodcarving.

He became a naturalized U.S. citizen in 1955.

Ignas Končius died on February 19, 1975, in Putnam, Connecticut. He was initially buried in St. Casimir Lithuanian Cemetery in Chicago. In 1996, his remains were reinterred at Rasos Cemetery in Vilnius, Lithuania next to his wife.

== Scholarly work and publications ==
Končius authored approximately 20 scientific books and more than 300 popular science articles. He also made significant contributions to the development of scientific terminology and scholarly publishing.

Textbooks and scientific works

- Meteorologija (Meteorology, 1924) — the first Lithuanian textbook on the subject
- Fizikos paskaitos (Physics Lectures, 1927–1928)
- 50 fizikos praktikos darbų (50 Physics Laboratory Works, 1928)
- Eksperimentinės fizikos paskaitos (Lectures on Experimental Physics, 1939)
- Fizikos praktikos darbai (co-author; Physics Practical Works, 1938)

He compiled the first bilingual Lithuanian–Russian dictionary of physics terminology in collaboration with the linguist Jonas Jablonskis. Končius also served as one of the editors of the Lietuvių enciklopedija (Lithuanian Encyclopedia, 1933–1942; 1953–1956).

=== Ethnographic and cultural works ===
- Žemaičių kryžių ir koplytėlių statistika (Statistics of Samogitian Crosses and Roadside Shrines), published in journals
- Palangos kraštas (The Palanga Region, 1925), with V. Ruokis
- Instrukcija etnografinei medžiagai rinkti (Instructions for Collecting Ethnographic Material, 1931)
- 20 kelionių po Kauno apskritį (20 Trips around Kaunas County, 1937), with K. Avižonis and S. Kolupaila
- Medžio drožiniai gimtajam kraštui atminti (Wood Carvings in Memory of the Homeland, 1954)
- Žemaičio šnekos (Samogitian Speech, 1961; 2nd ed. 1996)
- Žemaičių kryžiai ir koplytėlės (Samogitian Crosses and Roadside Shrines, 1965)
- Kelionė į Červenę ir atgal (A Journey to Chervyen and Back, 1993)
- Mano eitasis kelias (My Life’s Path, 2001; expanded eds. 2006, 2016)

== Legacy ==
Končius contributed to the development of Lithuanian scientific language, education, and ethnographic research. His photographic and documentary work provides a record of traditional Lithuanian folk art and material culture.

His photographs are preserved in major institutions, including the Russian Museum of Ethnography in Saint Petersburg, the National Museum of Lithuania, the M. K. Čiurlionis National Museum of Art, and the Aušra Museum in Šiauliai [lt].
