= Rudnyanski rural council =

Rudnyanski rural council may rever to the following selsoviets in Belrus:

- Rudnyanski rural council, Chervyen district
- Rudnyanski rural council, Zhytkavichy district
