= Jonas Vabalas-Gudaitis =

Lithuanian psychologist (1881–1955)

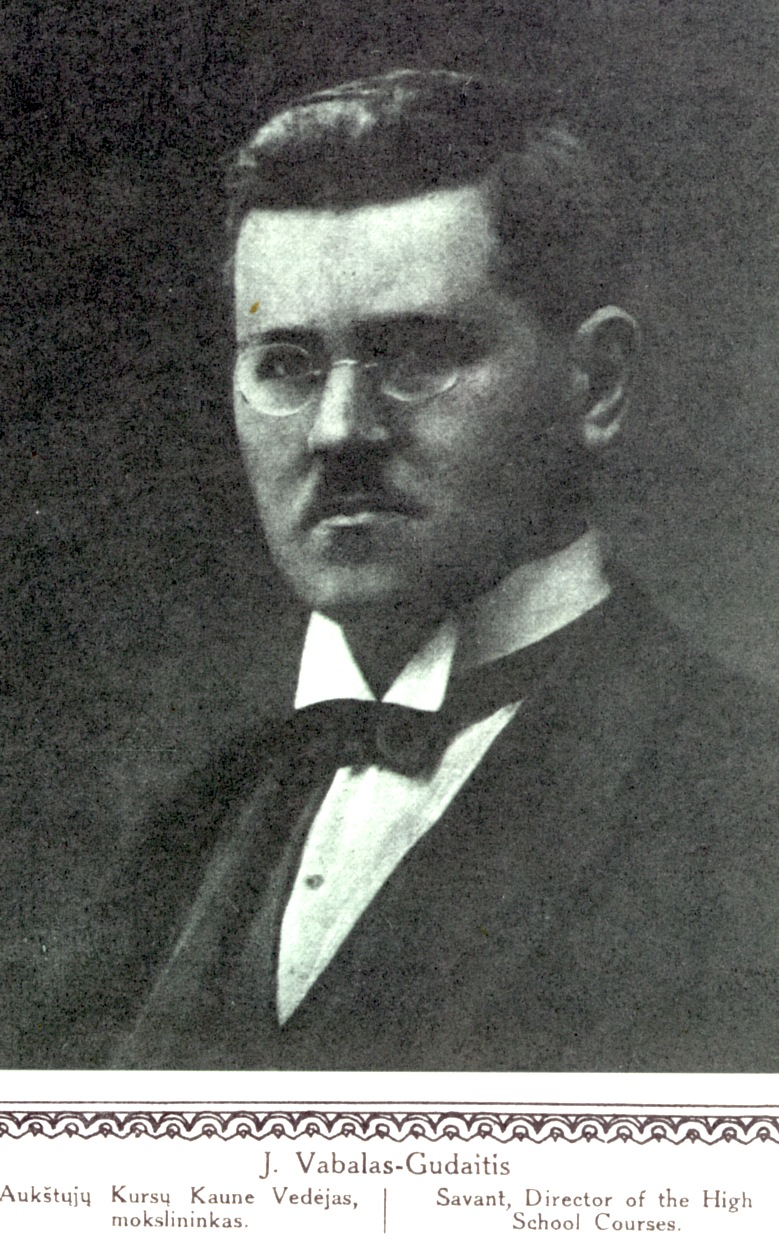
- Jonas Vabalas-Gudaitis
- Born: Jonas Vabalas; 14 January 1881; Ožnugariai, Kovno Governorate, Russian Empire
- Died: 14 November 1955 (aged 74); Vilnius, Lithuanian Soviet Socialist Republic
- Resting place: Rasos Cemetery
- Education: St. Petersburg State University; Moscow Academy of Agriculture
- Known for: Experimental psychology
- Scientific career
- Fields: Psychology, pedagogy, sociology, criminology, linguistics

Jonas Vabalas-Gudaitis (14 January 1881 – 14 November 1955) was a Lithuanian psychologist, educator, agronomist, hydrologist, philosopher of language, criminology and ethics, and professor of the Vytautas Magnus University and Vilnius University. A member of the Freethinkers' Society of Ethical Culture, he is best known as the beginner of experimental psychology and scientific pedagogy in Lithuania, being one of the first in Europe to apply the principle of synergetic interaction in pedagogy and psychology.

Born to a peasant family on a farm in Ožnugariai, both of Vabalas-Gudaitis's parents died when he was young. He studied in Palanga and Šiauliai before entering the nature faculty of Saint Petersburg State University to study physiology. In Russia, Vabalas-Gudaitis attended seminars by psychologists Konstantin Ushinsky and Aleksandr Petrovich Nechayev. After completing his studies in 1913, Vabalas-Gudaitis wished to return to Lithuania to work as a teacher, but due to low prospects switched to studying agronomy and joined the Moscow Academy of Agriculture, completing it a year after the outbreak of World War One. Due to the war, Vabalas-Gudaitis was forced to stay in Russia and not return to Lithuania, and consequently, he began working as a hydrologist in the Saratov Governorate.

After returning to Lithuania in 1918 to Bolshevik-occupied Vilnius, Vabalas-Gudaitis gained a career in pedagogy, but was sent back to Russia for further education. After the Vilna offensive, during which Vilnius was taken by Poland, Vabalas-Gudaitis moved to Kaunas and began a career in experimental psychology. Becoming a professor and the head of the pedagogy department in Vytautas Magnus University, Vabalas-Gudaitis held various seminars and constructed tests intended for students, which teachers of state schools received. During the Soviet occupation of Lithuania, Vabalas-Gudaitis retained his position, but was stripped of his duties during the German occupation and was almost arrested and sent to Stutthof concentration camp. After the Soviet re-occupation of Lithuania, Vabalas-Gudaitis was once again made professor, and spent the remaining years of his life in Lithuania, joining the Lithuanian Communist Party in 1948, and dying in 1955.

== Early life ==
=== Early life ===
Jonas Vabalas-Gudaitis was born on 14 January 1881 in the village of Ožnugariai in the Russian Empire. His parents owned a small farm, and Vabalas-Gudaitis grew up with one brother. At the age of six, Vabalas-Gudaitis's mother died, and his father married for a second time. In 1895 Vabalas-Gudaitis graduated from Palanga Progymnasium. His father died soon after from illness. Privately tutoring children of wealthy parents, in 1902 Vabalas-Gudaitis graduated from the Šiauliai Gymnasium and entered Saint Petersburg State University to study physiology.

=== Studies in Russia ===
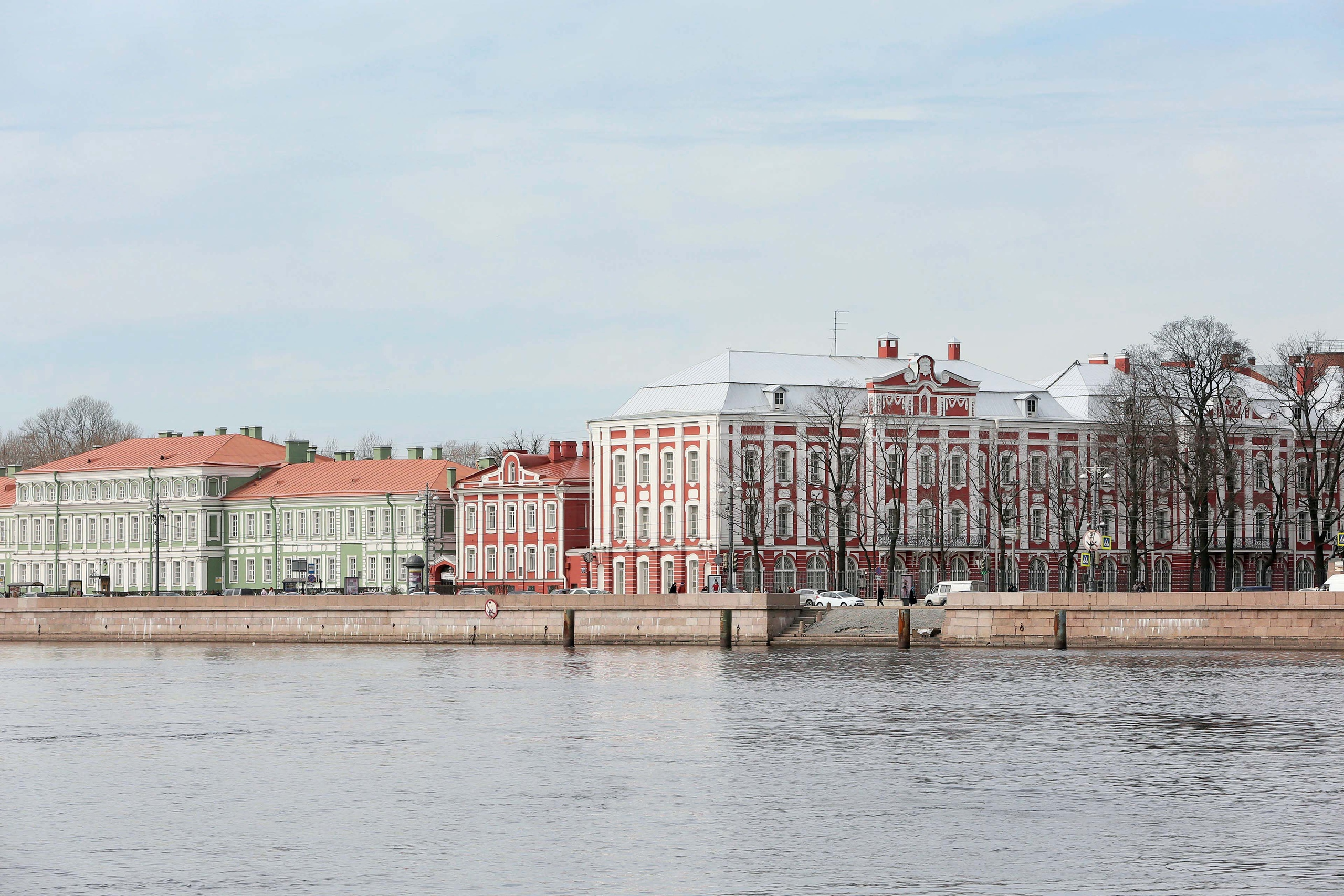
St. Petersburg State University

After three years of study, Vabalas-Gudaitis quit and began attending courses held by Konstantin Ushinsky. In 1907 Vabalas-Gudaitis became a laboratory assistant at Aleksandr Petrovich Nechayev's laboratory of experimental psychology. In 1910, at the first convention of Russian experimental pedagogues, Vabalas-Gudaitis presented his work on research of attention, arguing that attention is not caused by a stimulus given by a stranger, but rather is performed by the subject himself when he is best prepared to respond to the stimulus. After completing university in St. Petersburg and studies with Ushinsky in 1913, Vabalas-Gudaitis wished to return to Lithuania to work as a teacher. However, becoming a teacher would potentially be too difficult to make a proper living, and Vabalas-Gudaitis decided to switch to agronomy for a better perspective. He joined the Moscow Academy of Agriculture and completed it in 1915. The beginning of World War I a year before would not let Vabalas-Gudaitis return to Lithuania, and as a result he was forced to stay in the Russian Empire. During the Russian Revolution and the First World War, Vabalas-Gudaitis worked in the Saratov Governorate as a hydrologist.

== Psychologist in Lithuania ==
=== Return to Lithuania ===
After returning to Lithuania, Gudaitis-Vabalas could not decide whether to become a teacher, a biologist, or an agronomist. According to his wife, Vaclovas Biržiška convinced Vabalas-Gudaitis to become a pedagogue. In 1919 he was appointed the head of the experimental pedagogy institute, which would later become the university's faculty of pedagogy. That same year he was part of a temporary Vilnius Lithuanian committee set up by Józef Piłsudski's brother Jan Piłsudski. Vabalas-Gudaitis wrote the institute's statute, created a pedagogical museum, a laboratory, and also a school. As Vilnius was under Russian occupation at that time due to the Lithuanian Wars of Independence, Vabalas-Gudaitis was sent over to Moscow and St. Petersburg to get acquainted with similar institutions. After the Vilna offensive, during which Vilnius fell into Polish hands, Vabalas-Gudaitis moved to Kaunas, where he began organizing courses. From 1918 to 1920 he worked in Lithuania's Ministry of Education. From 1921 to 1922 Vabalas-Gudaitis was the head of these courses. In Kaunas, Vabalas-Gudaitis created a laboratory of experimental psychology, which he especially expanded in 1922 after beginning work as head of the department in the Vytautas Magnus University, later becoming a docent, and in 1927 – a professor. Vabalas-Gudaitis gave lectures not only to universities and in courses, but also to teachers. He lectured pedagogy in psychology in the Kaunas Art School, where he met student Birutė Smilgaitė, whom he would marry in 1922. His wife helped Vabalas-Gudaitis organize documents.

=== Development of pedagogy and psychology ===
In 1923 Vabalas-Gudaitis was sent to Germany to get acquainted with pedagogy and psychology lectures in a foreign country. He visited universities in Leipzig, Göttingen, and Hamburg. After returning to Lithuania his laboratory received new useful equipment for anthropometrical measuring and psychometry. According to a report by the university, Gudaitis's laboratory "researches students' intellect and detects their norms, gives advice to mothers and teachers, holds connections with similar institutions abroad". Vabalas-Gudaitis researched human reaction, and in 1923 he gave a lecture in Leipzig on how to detect a person's motor and sensor type based on their reaction. He also published a book entitled An improved mental response method for studying human performance in 1927. To ensure that his research isn't only accessible to a small selection of specialists, that same year he published a series of non-verbal tests along with tests by Alfred Binet and Théodore Simon in a newspaper meant for teachers of every state school. In 1928, Vabalas-Gudaitis published a report on guiding the teachers' observations of their students. He spent the rest of his life modifying the classification of psychological reactions based on the synergy of the nervous system, underlining that a person's behavior is the conglomeration of the traits they were born with as well as outside influences. Gudaitis also developed machines for reaction testing, and held teachers in high regard as the carriers of responsibility for the future of the country. That same year, Vabalas-Gudaitis's only son, Jonas Vabalas-Gudaitis, was born.

Vabalas-Gudaitis also held a keen interest in philosophy, sociology, and language, and wrote on the role of language and the formation of a person's moral values. Taking influence from Charles Darwin and William James, Vabalas-Gudaitis explored the physiological effects of fear and presented a genetical classification of fears. While researching criminology, Vabalas-Gudaitis also wrote on the origins of different criminal types, postulating that nativists hold inheritance as the highest value and as such do not solve the problem but put it to the "dark past", while empiricists look for the causes of the crime in environmental, external factors; Vabalas-Gudaitis claimed that in reality, there is a synergy between internal and external psychophysical human forces, and therefore crime arises from a person's biosocial interaction. In 1932, Vabalas-Gudaitis let Lithuanian psychologist Vladimiras Lazersonas hold lectures on experimental psychology instead of him, retiring to a more writing-based lifestyle. Vabalas-Gudaitis drew attention to the dynamics of culture and nature, in that in one place, people adapt to nature in one way, in another - in a different way, and this is how the spirit of the nation is formed – "In art, faith, and habits that have been formed over the centuries, the nations visibly differ from each other. It is difficult to go against those characteristics, to oppose them. The spirit of the nation formed over the ages is so powerful that we depend more on the dead members of our nation than on the living."

== Later years ==
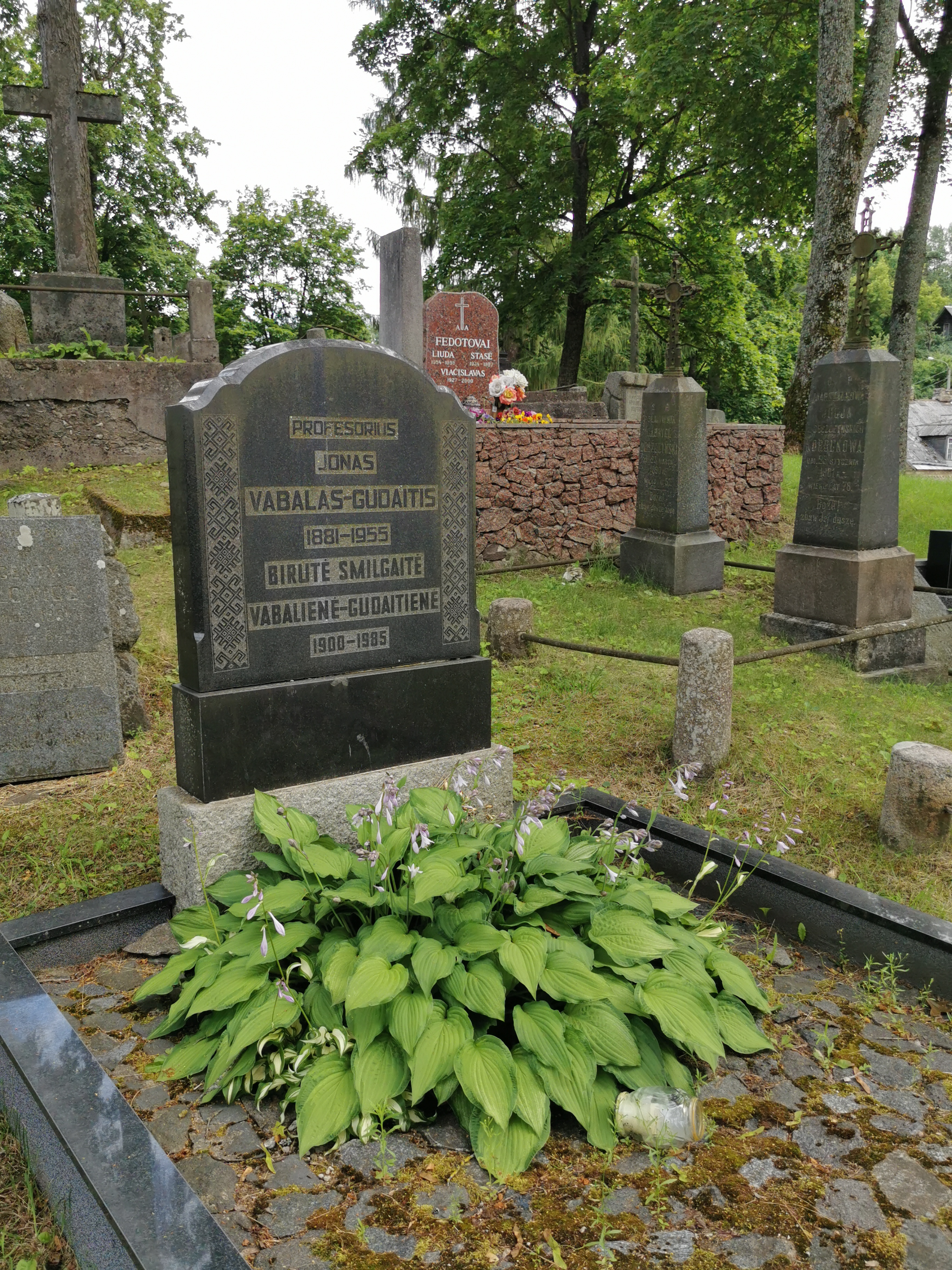
Grave of Jonas Vabalas-Gudaitis and his wife

=== Soviet and German occupation of Lithuania ===
After the 1940 Soviet occupation of Lithuania, Vabalas-Gudaitis was made the head of the pedagogy department of Vilnius University. During the Nazi German occupation of Lithuania in 1941, Vabalas-Gudaitis was relieved from his duties and had to go into hiding. In 1943 his home was raided with the intention of sending him to the Stutthof concentration camp, but he was not found, and consequently avoided deportion. In 1946, Vabalas-Gudaitis's son died at the age of 18. After the Soviet re-occupation of Lithuania, Vabalas-Gudaitis was once again made head of the pedagogy department at Vilnius University, and received the title of professor.

=== Last years ===
In 1947, Vabalas-Gudaitis gave a lecture in Leningrad on the classification of psychological functions. In 1948 he joined the Communist Party of Lithuania. For some time he was the dean of the faculty of history and philology of Vilnius University. In 1951 he published an article on Ivan Pavlov. In 1953, Vabalas-Gudaitis retired. Jonas Vabalas-Gudaitis died on 14 November 1955 in Vilnius at the age of 74. He is buried in the Rasos Cemetery.

== See also ==
- History of Lithuania
- History of Psychology
