= Palanga Progymnasium =

Coordinates: 55°55′05″N 21°03′58″E

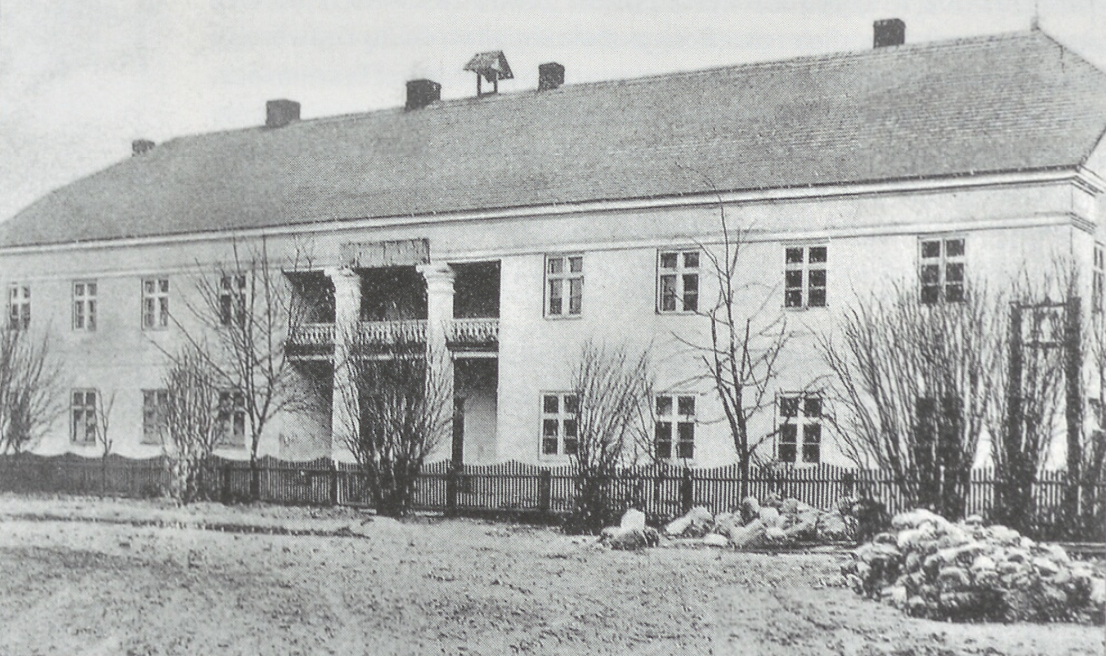
Building of the progymnasium

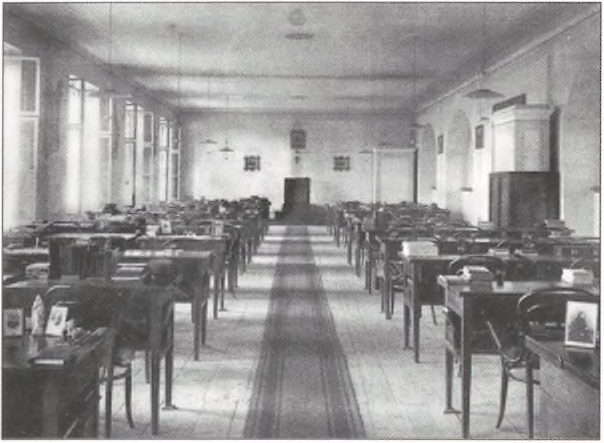
Classroom of the progymnasium

Palanga Progymnasium (Lithuanian: Palangos progimnazija) was a progymnasium (middle school) that operated from 1886 to 1915 in Palanga, then part of the Russian Empire. It was a four-class Russian school for boys sponsored by graf Józef Tyszkiewicz. Several notable Lithuanians attended the school, including four signatories of the Act of Independence of Lithuania.

== History ==
In 1886, graf Józef Tyszkiewicz established the progymnasium (four-class school) in place of a German-language town school. Tyszkiewicz financed the school, but it had same rights as a government school. The school belonged to the Riga Educational District. At the time, Palanga was a small remote town with no railway connections.

The school had 100 to 150 students. It taught religion, Latin, Greek, French, Russian languages, Russian literature, arithmetic, algebra, geometry, ancient and Russian history, natural sciences, drawing, cursive, singing, gymnastics. After graduation, a number of students continued to study at Kaunas Priest Seminary or other schools, most frequently in Jelgava Gymnasium or Liepāja Gymnasium in present-day Latvia where they could get admitted without further examination to the 5th grade.

In 1913, when the school had 153 students, it was reorganized into a gymnasium. However, due to World War I, the school was evacuated in September 1915 first to Võru in Estonia and then to Stavropol in North Caucasus.

== School building ==
The school occupied a two-floor brick building constructed by bishop Ignacy Jakub Massalski (1726–1794). It stood near the Church of the Assumption of the Blessed Virgin Mary and was previously used as a town hall. The school building was one of 318 buildings destroyed on 10 May 1938 during a major city fire.

== Student life ==
The school admitted boys but had no requirements for student age or social status. Therefore, it was attended by several older students already in their 20s. The school was attended by students of various faiths (Catholics, Jews, Eastern Orthodoxs, and Protestants). It charged 52 Russian rubles per year for tuition. In 1893, a separate society was formed to provide financial aid to the financially underprivileged. Tuition wavers were also available for good grades. Therefore, the school was a popular choice for students of lower classes. Both students and teachers wore school uniform. Most students lived in private dormitories.

Russian language was used both for instruction and after classes. Most teachers were Russians, with a few Germans and Latvians. However, Palanga was then part of the Courland Governorate where Russification policies were not as strict as in the Vilna Governorate-General. Several Lithuanian students who later became prominent figures in Lithuanian politics and culture attended the school. They organized small student groups and shared the banned Lithuanian press which was smuggled from East Prussia. Their activities were supported by Catholic school chaplains Marcijonas Povilas Jurgaitis and Juozapas Viksva. In 1896, Tsarist authorities demanded that Lithuanian Catholic students would pray in Russian. School chaplain Kazimieras Genys resisted such orders, but fearing persecution traveled to Rome to study canon law. Several students were expelled in connection with the protest, but were later readmitted. In 1899, two students participated in staging America in the Bathhouse, the first public Lithuanian-language theater performance in present-day Lithuania.

== Notable alumni ==
Several notable Lithuanians attended the school, including four signatories of the Act of Independence of Lithuania and eight ministers in interwar Lithuania. In February 2018, for the 100th anniversary of the Act of Independence of Lithuania, a monument titled the Alley of the Signatories was unveiled at the location of the school.

Notable alumni included:

- Blažiejus Čėsnys, Catholic priest
- Vladas Jurgutis, Lithuanian banker
- Steponas Kairys, Lithuanian politician
- Fabijonas Kemėšis, Lithuanian priest, economist
- Ignas Končius, Lithuanian physicist
- Stanislovas Kuizinas, Lithuanian military officer
- Pranas Liatukas, Lithuanian general
- Vladas Mongirdas, Lithuanian physician
- Vladas Nagius-Nagevičius, Lithuanian general
- Liudas Noreika, Minister of Justice
- Kazys Oželis, Lithuanian physician
- Juozas Rauktys, Lithuanian forester
- Jurgis Šaulys, Lithuanian diplomat
- Kazimieras Šaulys, Catholic priest
- Jonas Šimkus, Minister of Defence
- Rapolas Skipitis, Lithuanian politician
- Antanas Smetona, President of Lithuania
- Petras Šniukšta, Lithuanian general
- Juozas Tallat-Kelpša, Lithuanian composer
- Jonas Vabalas-Gudaitis, Lithuanian psychologist
- Mykolas Vaitkus, Lithuanian poet and priest
- Kazimieras Venclauskis, Lithuanian attorney
- Povilas Žadeikis, Lithuanian diplomat
- Juozas Žemgulys, Lithuanian surgeon
