= Chervyen massacre =

Soviet-perpetrated mass murder of political prisoners

- Part of NKVD prisoner massacres; Eastern Front (World War II)
- Chervyen (Belarus)
- Location: 53°41′16″N 28°28′20″E; Chervyen, Byelorussian SSR, Soviet Union
- Date: 25–27 June 1941
- Target: Political prisoners from Lithuania, Belarus, and Poland
- Attack type: NKVD prisoner massacre, War crime
- Perpetrator: 226th NKVD Convoy Regiment

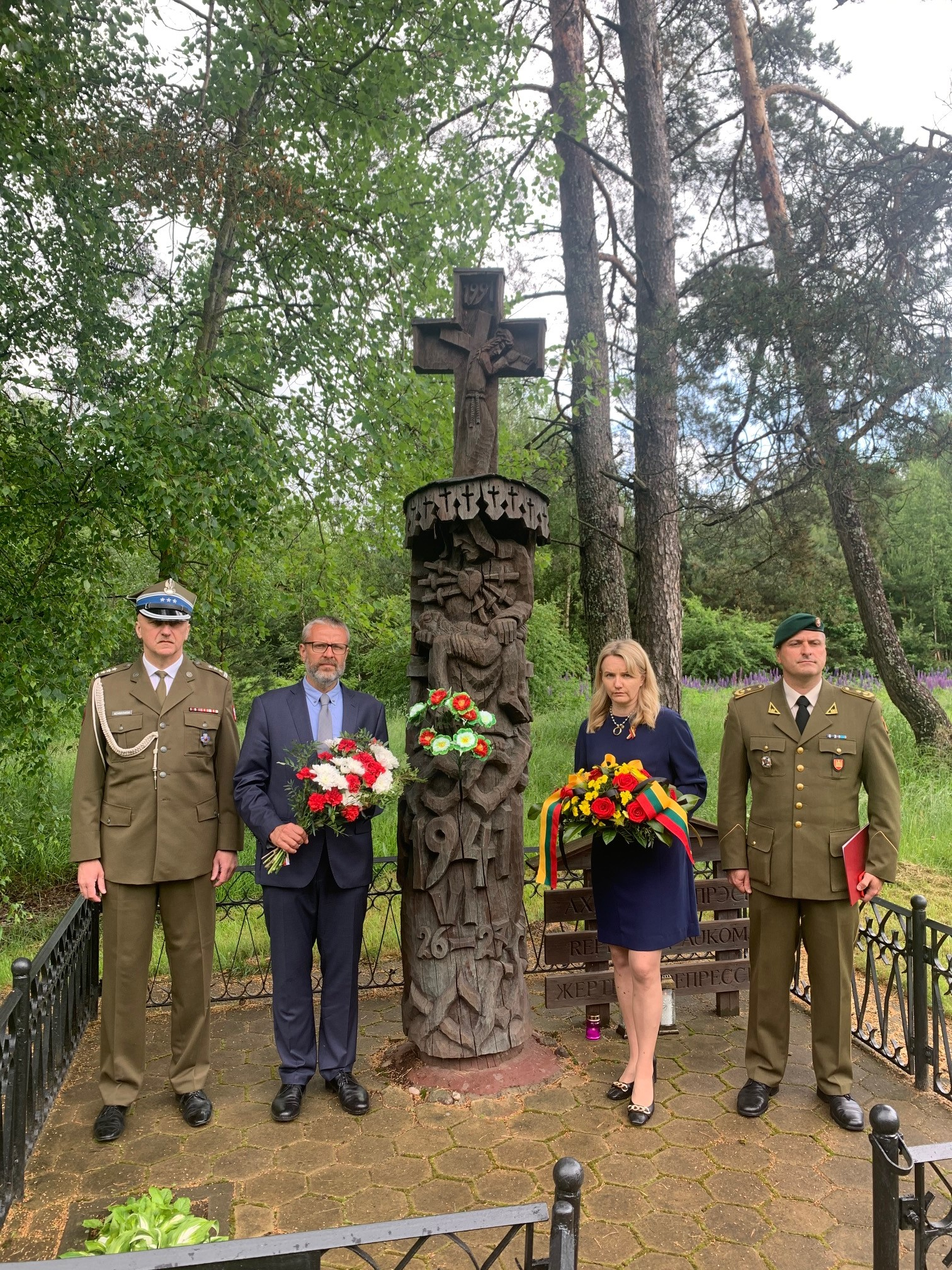
Polish and Lithuanian ambassadors in Belarus commemorating the 80th anniversary of the massacre in 2021

The Chervyen massacre (Lithuanian: Červenės žudynės; Belarusian: Чэрвеньскія расстрэлы, romanized: Červieńskija rasstrely), also called the Minsk–Chervyen Death March (Polish: Droga śmierci Mińsk–Czerwień) was a NKVD prisoner massacre on 25–27 June 1941. Political prisoners from Lithuania, Poland and Belarus were forced by the NKVD into a death march eastwards from Minsk to Chervyen (present-day Belarus) after Operation Barbarossa began and many were executed.

The execution of the prisoners likely began as early as the night of June 22–23, 1941. The NKVD murdered some prisoners while they were still in Minsk. The rest were herded on foot toward Mogilev. During the several-day march, the prisoners suffered from heat, hunger, and thirst. They were also massacred by their guards. On June 26 or 27, the marching columns reached Chervyen, where the NKVD shot several hundred to a thousand more prisoners. A few survived thanks to the escape of guards and the arrival of the Wehrmacht.

The number of prisoners murdered on the death march remains unknown. Some estimates, though likely inflated, suggest it could have reached as high as 18,000. Among the victims were many Lithuanians, Belarusians, as well as Polish citizens arrested in the territories of interwar Poland annexed by the Soviet Union.

== Background ==
In spring 1941, there were two prisons in Minsk, then the capital of the Byelorussian SSR:

- The main (central) prison at Pishchalauski Castle at Valadarskaha Street 1, commonly known as Volodarka. Some of the evacuated prisoners, including about a hundred Lithuanians from Kaunas Prison, were gathered at Pishchalauski Castle in Minsk which already housed a number of Polish prisoners, members of the Union of Armed Struggle.
- The prison called Amerikanka at the headquarters of the SSR's NKVD at 12 Uritsky Prospekt (now Independence Avenue), also known as "Okrąglak".
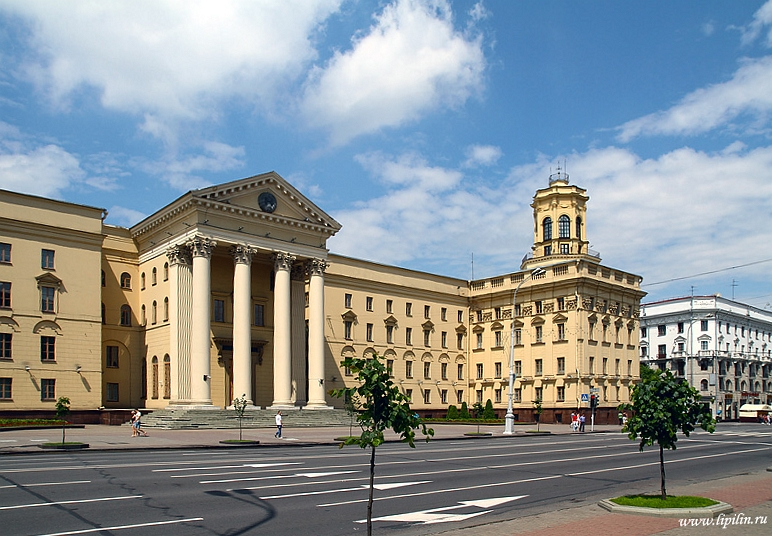
The NKVD headquarters and detention centre in Minsk, currently the headquarters of the Belarusian KGB

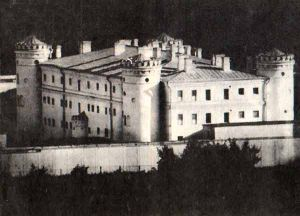
Pishchalauski Castle in Minsk, the so-called Volodarka

Amerikanka was an investigative prison. It housed individuals of special interest to the NKVD, as well as prisoners under investigation or awaiting sentencing. Meanwhile, "Volodarka" served, among other functions, as a transit prison, from which convicts were transported deep into the Soviet Union.

On June 22, 1941, Nazi Germany invaded the Soviet Union. The first weeks of the war were very successful for the German side. Wehrmacht divisions managed to crush the forces of the Soviet border military districts and then penetrate deep into Soviet-occupied territory. The German offensive in Belarus was particularly successful, encircling and completely defeating the Soviet Western Front in less than two weeks during the Battle of Białystok–Minsk.

The Soviet authorities were determined to prevent the Germans from releasing political prisoners held in the war zone. On June 24, 1941, Lavrentiy Beria, People's Commissar of Internal Affairs, ordered regional NKGB offices to shoot all political prisoners whose evacuation into the interior of the country was impossible. Beria's order stipulated that those convicted of "counter-revolutionary activity," "anti-Soviet agitation," sabotage, and diversion, as well as political prisoners under investigation, were to be executed.

The so-called death marches, during which prisoners were led from their cells and then driven eastward in the summer heat for many days, became a characteristic feature of the liquidation of prisons in present-day Belarus. As a result of this "evacuation," prisoners died en masse from exhaustion, hunger, and thirst, were killed in Luftwaffe air raids, and were murdered by their guards.

== Massacre ==
=== Death march ===
NKVD documents indicate that the prison population in Minsk as of June 10, 1941, was 1,802. However, it is uncertain whether this number includes prisoners from all Minsk prisons or only those in the central prison ("Volodartsy"). Much suggests that the number of prisoners was higher when the evacuation began, as both immediately before the German invasion and after June 22, the NKVD continued mass arrests of real and alleged opponents of Soviet rule. These individuals were not recorded in the prison records. Furthermore, in the first days of the war, prisoners evacuated from border towns were sent to Minsk. On the night of June 23–24, between 115 and 300 prisoners from Kaunas (Note: There were about a dozen Poles and Russians among them.) were brought there. On 24 June, 15 Lithuanians who had received death sentences before the evacuation were executed (among them was Steponas Rusteika, Lithuanian Minister of the Interior in 1929–1934). According to Polish sources, in June 1941, approximately 2,000-3,000 people were held in the cells of the "Amerikanka" prison alone.

In the first days of the war, Minsk was heavily bombed by the Luftwaffe. The "Volodarka" building also suffered damage from the air raids. According to Janusz Prawdzic-Szlaski, head of the ZWZ Białystok Area intelligence service, who was imprisoned in Minsk at the time, but in a different prison, two German bombs fell on the central prison on June 23, killing several dozen prisoners. Jonas Petruitis, an eyewitness to the event, recalled that the raid took place on June 24, and the bombs hit the administration building, killing ten NKVD officers, including the prison's deputy warden, and partially destroying the prison office and its inmate files. Due to the prevailing chaos, both Minsk prisons experienced supply problems. Prisoners were either not given water or food, or received minimal supplies.

It's likely that on the night of June 22–23, NKVD officers began murdering prisoners. Witnesses recalled that the sounds of executions were clearly audible in neighbouring cells. Janusz Prawdzic-Szlaski claimed that prisoners in the "Amerikanka" cell were killed by being forcibly poisoned. Those who resisted were shot in their cells. Among those killed at that time was a courier from the Union of Armed Struggle Headquarters, codenamed "Teresa." Executions also took place in the "Volodarka" cell, where sick prisoners, among others, were murdered.

On June 23, an undetermined number of "Amerikanka's" prisoners were loaded onto railway cars and transported to Kozhva in the Komi Republic. At "Volodarka," juvenile criminals were released. The remaining prisoners were formed into columns of 200–300 to as many as 1,000 people and then driven east on foot along the Mogilev Road. NKVD reports indicate that the evacuation began on June 24 or on the night of June 24–25. Survivors' accounts indicate that the evacuation began on the afternoon of June 24, and continued throughout the night until dawn. One Soviet report states that the escort was provided by 170 soldiers from the 226th NKVD Convoy Regiment (Russian: 226-го полка конвойных войск НКВД). Bogdan Musiał, however, states that the escort also included soldiers of the border troops, militia officers and prison guards.

On 25 June, about 2,000 prisoners were marched on foot by troops from the 42nd NKVD Convoy Brigade to Chervyen. Along the way, about 500 prisoners were executed for failing to keep up. A Soviet report claimed that 209 prisoners were shot due to confusion and a German air attack.

The first part of the march passed through the streets of the burning city. The evacuees were then ordered to abandon their luggage. Some prisoners, especially those living in Minsk, attempted to escape in the chaos. However, in most cases, they were killed by the guards' bullets. Some attempted to blend in with the crowd of refugees and fire victims. The escort then ruthlessly opened fire, killing both the escapees and civilians who got too close to the column. There were also cases of prisoners dying under the rubble of collapsing buildings.

The first assembly point was a forest located approximately 5 kilometres (3.1 mi) from the city. All prisoners taken from Minsk, as well as from prisons and detention centres in nearby towns, were sent there. According to Janusz Prawdzic-Szlaski, the number of evacuees could have reached as many as 20,000 people. The Chief Commission for the Prosecution of Crimes against the Polish Nation reached similar conclusions, estimating that approximately 20,000 prisoners were driven towards Mogilev, including 8,000–11,000 prisoners taken from Minsk. Among them were many Polish citizens arrested in the interwar Poland's north-eastern territories. Among the prisoners were minors.

Seeing a 12-year-old girl walking next to me, I asked her why she had been arrested. With great seriousness and surprise, she replied: "For counterrevolution and espionage"; she came from Nyasvizh – Janusz Prawdzic-Szlaski's memoirs.

Among the evacuees were also: Lithuanians – political prisoners brought from Kaunas (numbering from 115 to 300 people), Red Army officers and soldiers arrested by the NKVD, including pilots, Paul Jung – a Swiss citizen who volunteered to take part in the Winter War on the Finnish side, allegedly even French and British soldiers who, after escaping from German POW camps, were interned in the USSR.

Witnesses recalled that a group of several hundred prisoners, all under death sentences, was kept on the sidelines. These men were shot shortly after the rest of the prisoners were led out of the forest. (Note: Janusz Prawdzic-Szlaski was among this group. He survived because, during a stop in the forest, he slipped unnoticed into another column and managed to shave his beard and swap clothes with another prisoner.) The remaining prisoners were herded further east, divided into columns that marched several kilometers apart. Rest breaks were short and few. Only in the final phase of the march did the NKVD officers provide some women with transport by truck. (Note: The prisoners who were provided with road transport during the march did not reach Chervyen. They were taken to Mogilev, from where, along with prisoners from the local prison, they were transported by train to Sverdlovsk.) Well-fed criminal prisoners ("Urka" or "blatniacy") set the pace, which had disastrous consequences for the remaining marchers. The summer heat was oppressive and the prisoners were only able to quench their thirst if they managed to find drinkable water at the stopping point. They were given minimal amounts of food, which usually ended up in the hands of the "blatniacy". During German air raids, prisoners were driven to the middle of the road, while the guards hid under trees or in roadside ditches. (Note: Witnesses claimed that German planes flew over the marching columns but did not attack them.) Shouting, kicks, and blows from rifle butts forced the victims to march faster. Those who, due to exhaustion, could not keep up with the column were shot or bayoneted by the guards. The same fate befell prisoners who attempted to escape or resist, reacted too slowly to commands, or even attracted the attention of the guards by talking to fellow prisoners or watching German planes. Neither women nor minors were spared. The bodies of the murdered, which the guards did not bury, quickly decomposed in the summer heat. Stronger prisoners (excluding the "blatniak") tried to help their exhausted comrades whenever possible.

During the march, the NKVD continued to liquidate prisoners deemed particularly dangerous. Witnesses recalled that officers closely monitored the columns, called out individuals one by one, led them aside, and then shot them. Some victims were forced to kneel or bend over with blows from rifle butts, thus making it easier for the executioners to fire the fatal shot.

The evacuation was also accompanied by mass executions:

- During a stop near Chervyen, 20 prisoners were pulled from one column and shot over a gravel pit.
- A column of approximately 300 prisoners was directed to a side road and stopped near an alder grove. At the same time, a car carrying a group of NKVD officers arrived from the direction of Minsk. They ordered the escort to murder all the prisoners. Several of them overheard the conversation and warned their comrades. As a result, some of the prisoners attempted to escape, but only fourteen were successful. The rest were shot dead with machine gun fire.
- Another column of approximately 200 prisoners was led to a roadside grove near Chervyen. There, the guards released the criminal prisoners and shot the rest.
- Another column, consisting of an unknown number of prisoners, was also stopped near a forest near Chervyen. There, the escort ordered the prisoners to flee and then opened fire on them with machine guns. The wounded were finished off. The bodies of the murdered were crushed by truck wheels, or, according to another version, by tank tracks. Only one person is said to have survived the massacre.
- Under unknown circumstances, a group of Poles wearing characteristic long coats, as remembered by witnesses, were shot. (Note: They were probably prisoners of war from the Polish Army. Other speculation suggests they may have been railway workers or Catholic clergy.)

In dramatic circumstances, one of the columns, numbering 1,200 people, escaped massacre. At one point, the convoy leader received a written order to shoot the prisoners, but after reading it, he tore up the document and took his own life. The disoriented guards fled, and the prisoners, left to their own devices, scattered throughout the area.

=== Chervyen ===
On June 26 or 27, after covering a distance of 65 kilometres (40 mi), the prisoners reached the town of Chervyen. Joanna Stankiewicz-Januszczak recalled that the inhabitants treated the prisoners with sympathy, trying to give them food and water, without any significant obstacles from the guards. (Note: Similar information is provided by the memoirs of Jonas Petruitis, who adds, however, that the Jewish inhabitants of Chervyen were an exception. They allegedly treated the prisoners with clear hostility and even called for an escort to shoot them .) The prisoners were gathered in the yard of the local prison; according to Janusz Prawdzic-Szlaski, only 2,000 of the nearly 20,000 prisoners who were supposed to depart from Minsk reached the prison. On 26 June, the remaining prisoners were placed in the Chervyen prison. A few criminal prisoners were released when they volunteered for the Red Army. The arrivals were given a cup of water and 100–200 grams of bread each. Shortly thereafter, the NKVD officers began calling out selected prisoners by name. Two who volunteered were immediately taken to the prison bathhouse and shot.

Soon, the NKVD officers began segregating prisoners by gender and by conviction or charge. Two groups of men were formed – one numbering approximately 600–700, the other approximately 400 – as well as a group of approximately 30 women. Some political prisoners, sensing the impending danger, posed as common criminals or people caught attempting to illegally cross the border, thus avoiding selection. Lithuanian witnesses also report that a large group of criminal prisoners were led out of prison and volunteered to join the Red Army.

On 27 June, Belarusian NKVD received a telegram from Mikhail Ivanovich Nikolsky, head of the NKVD prison department in Moscow, ordering to leave 400 prisoners in Chervyen and execute the rest. Since prisoner files were destroyed by German bombardment in Minsk, the guards made their selection of 400–750 prisoners almost randomly.

On the night from 26 to 27 June, the selected prisoners were marched from Chervyen towards Babruysk. Initially, the NKVD soldiers shot those prisoners that lagged behind. Then, by a forest about 1.5–2 kilometres (0.93–1.24 mi) from Chervyen, NKVD organized the mass execution. Of Lithuanian prisoners, about 40 survived.

In the evening, the aforementioned group of 600–700 men was led out of the prison and driven southeast along the road to Babruysk. After covering approximately 3–4 kilometers, the column reached a forest, where the escort began shooting prisoners, starting with those marching in the rear ranks. At one point, vehicles carrying armed Soviets appeared on the road, retreating eastward. Believing the situation to be an attack by German saboteurs, they opened fire on both the prisoners and their escorts. On the NKVD's orders, the entire column fell to the ground. After explaining the situation, the escorts ordered the prisoners to flee into the forest, then opened fire with machine guns and began throwing grenades at them. After the massacre was over, they piled the bodies of the dead in a pile, doused them with gasoline, and set them on fire. Only 37 prisoners survived, having managed to escape from the execution site. Among them was Janusz Prawdzic-Szlaski. After a grueling three-day walk through forests and swamps, the surviving prisoners encountered German troops.

A tragic fate also befell the second group of men. They were taken to the forest near Chervyen and shot there. Only eight survived the massacre. However, a select few women survived, managing to hide in the prison's recesses and thus surviving until liberation.

Soviet reports indicate that the execution of prisoners detained for "counter-revolutionary crimes" was ordered by the head of the NKVD prison administration of the Byelorussian SSR, Stepanov.

In total, about 200 prisoners escaped.

== Epilogue ==
In the early morning hours of June 27 or 28, following a German air raid on the town, NKVD officers escaped from Chervyen. The "Błatniaks" seized the opportunity and plundered the prison's food warehouse, while the remaining prisoners escaped. Those locked in their cells were freed by Chervyen residents who broke into the prison after the NKVD officers' escape. The Belarusian prisoners went to the town and then went home. Poles and prisoners of other nationalities fled to the surrounding forests and, under their cover, attempted to escape westward.

Escaping from prison did not automatically guarantee survival. Prisoners who encountered Soviet patrols were often shot on the spot. On the other hand, survivors of the "death march" were usually met with kindness and assistance from the local Belarusian population.

The NKVD's crimes were exploited by Nazi propaganda. Janusz Prawdzic-Szlaski recalled that when he was sent to a transit camp (Durchgangslager) after escaping from the execution site, the Germans showed the inmates films showing, among other things, the bodies of prisoners murdered on the death march.

A delegation from the Lithuanian Red Cross searched for prisoners who were deported from Kaunas after the outbreak of the war. Grażyna Lipińska recalled meeting its members after returning to Minsk, where they indicated that among the victims were "the flower of the Lithuanian intelligentsia".

== Victims ==
The number of victims of the death march remains difficult to determine. The list of departures and movements of transports from NKVD prisons of the Byelorussian SSR provides information:

Minsk – 2,000 prisoners were led out of Minsk on foot. They were brought to Chervyen, where 500 counterrevolutionary prisoners, according to the first category, were removed. Common criminals and ukazniki were released, while some fled. Four prisoners from the Minsk prison arrived in Sverdlovsk (Note: The prisoners who were provided with road transport during the march did not reach Chervyen. They were taken to Mogilev, from where, along with prisoners from the local prison, they were transported by train to Sverdlovsk.) on July 5, 1941, as part of a transport from Mogilev.

In turn, in the report of July 11, 1941, prepared by the head of the 3rd Unit of the 42nd NVKD Convoy Brigade, Junior Lieutenant Kompanijec, it was stated:

On June 26, 1941, approximately 2,000 people were evacuated from the prison in Minsk by a company of snipers, but due to continuous attacks on the convoy near Chervyen, 209 people were shot with the command's consent, and the prisoners detained for criminal offenses were released.

The number of evacuees given in Soviet documentation is most likely underestimated. The Chief Commission for the Prosecution of Crimes against the Polish Nation, based on the accounts of Janusz Prawdzic-Szlaski and other witnesses, estimated that only 1,000 prisoners brought to Cherven and 1,200 prisoners from the column that dispersed after the suicide of the convoy leader survived the "death march."

Assuming that 20,000 prisoners were evacuated, this would mean that the number of victims of the "death road" reached 18,000. Bogdan Musiał believes that these estimates appear to be significantly overstated and, at the same time, impossible to verify. Nevertheless, he has no doubt that the number of victims of the "death road" should be counted in the thousands.

Victims of the Minsk-Chervyen death march
Name		Ref.
Balys Giedraitis	colonel, Minister of National Defence of Lithuania in 1930–1934	
Steponas Rusteika	deputy mayor of Kaunas, Minister of Internal Affairs of Lithuania in 1929–1934	
priest Józef Radwański	parish priest in Rajgród	
Lt. Col. Jerzy Dąbrowski	Polish Army cavalry officer, participant in the Polish–Soviet War and the September Campaign	
Tadeusz Giedroyć	president of the District Court in Lutsk	
2nd Lieutenant Aleksander Polanko (a.k.a. "Kalikst")	chief of staff of ZWZ's Białystok Area	
Henryk Konstanty Andrzeykowicz	owner of several estates in the Wołkowysk County	
Cpl. Mieczysław Bauc	commander of a small partisan unit of the Union of Armed Struggle (ZWZ) operating in the eastern part of the Łomża County	
Włodzimierz Bocheński	veterinarian, owner of a landed estate in Polesia	
Stanisław Grzegorczyk	official from Białystok, co-author of the book The Legions' Fight for Białystok against the Background of the Battle of Warsaw in 1920	
Kazimierz Gumowski	clandestine courier and border guide	
Mikołaj Kaczan	mayor of Gmina Kleszczele	
Zbigniew Bronisław Malinowski	Polish Army Reserve's 2nd Lieutenant, junior high school teacher from Żyrardów	
Jan Orłowski	Polish Army Reserve's 2nd Lieutenant, junior high school teacher from Białystok	
brothers Franciszek and Hipolit Pankiewicz	owners of landed estates	
Jan Paszta	lawyer, secretary of the court and prosecutor's office in Białystok, member of the POW	
Flikier	Jewish owner of an oil mill in Białystok	

Survivors
Name		Ref.
Jonas Petruitis	Lithuanian Army colonel, author of memoirs from the death march	
Juozas Tumas	Lithuanian Army colonel, author of memoirs from the death march	
Ignas Končius	professor of physics at the Vytautas Magnus University in Kaunas	
Captain Janusz Prawdzic-Szlaski	head of intelligence and acting commander of the Białystok ZWZ Area	
Ludwik Audycki	mayor of Radashkovichy	
Captain Władysław Bruliński, pseudonym "Oskar"	head of the Bureau of Information and Propaganda of the Białystok ZWZ Area (seriously wounded during the execution)	
Joanna Stankiewicz-Januszczak	soldier of the Home Army, author of memoirs from the death march	
Bronisław Skarżyński	head of the school and member of the ZWZ from Jedwabne	
Zofia Borkowska, pseudonym "Marta"	head of communications of the Białystok ZWZ Area	
2nd Lieutenant Jan Buczyński, pseudonym "Zaręba"	commander of the Grajewo-Szczuczyn District (ZWZ)	
Irena Białówna	pediatrician from Białystok	
Grażyna Lipińska	head of the economic school complex in Grodno, participant in the defense of the city in September 1939	

== Polish investigation ==
The investigation into the mass murder of at least several thousand Polish citizens imprisoned by the NKVD in Minsk was initiated on September 9, 1992, by the Łódź Branch Commission for the Investigation of Crimes against the Polish Nation. In December 1997, it was suspended due to a request submitted to the Belarusian prosecutor's office to take over the case or identify additional witnesses. This request remained unanswered, and as a result, in February 2006, the investigation was resumed by the Warsaw Branch Commission for the Prosecution of Crimes against the Polish Nation. In late September 2009, it was taken over by the OKŚZpNP in Szczecin. Prosecutors from the Institute of National Remembrance's investigative division focused primarily on investigating the crimes committed during the evacuation of the Minsk prisons in June 1941. Ultimately, by a decision of July 9, 2018, the investigation was discontinued due to the deaths of the identified senior officials and direct perpetrators of the crimes and the failure to identify the remaining perpetrators.

The investigation identified 348 victims, along with another ten individuals about whom only fragmentary information was obtained. This list includes individuals imprisoned by the NKVD in Minsk – both those murdered on the "Death Road" or killed and died under other circumstances, as well as those who survived imprisonment and the evacuation in June 1941.

In the opinion of the Institute of National Remembrance, the crimes committed by the NKVD in Minsk prisons meet the criteria of communist crime, which is also a crime against humanity.

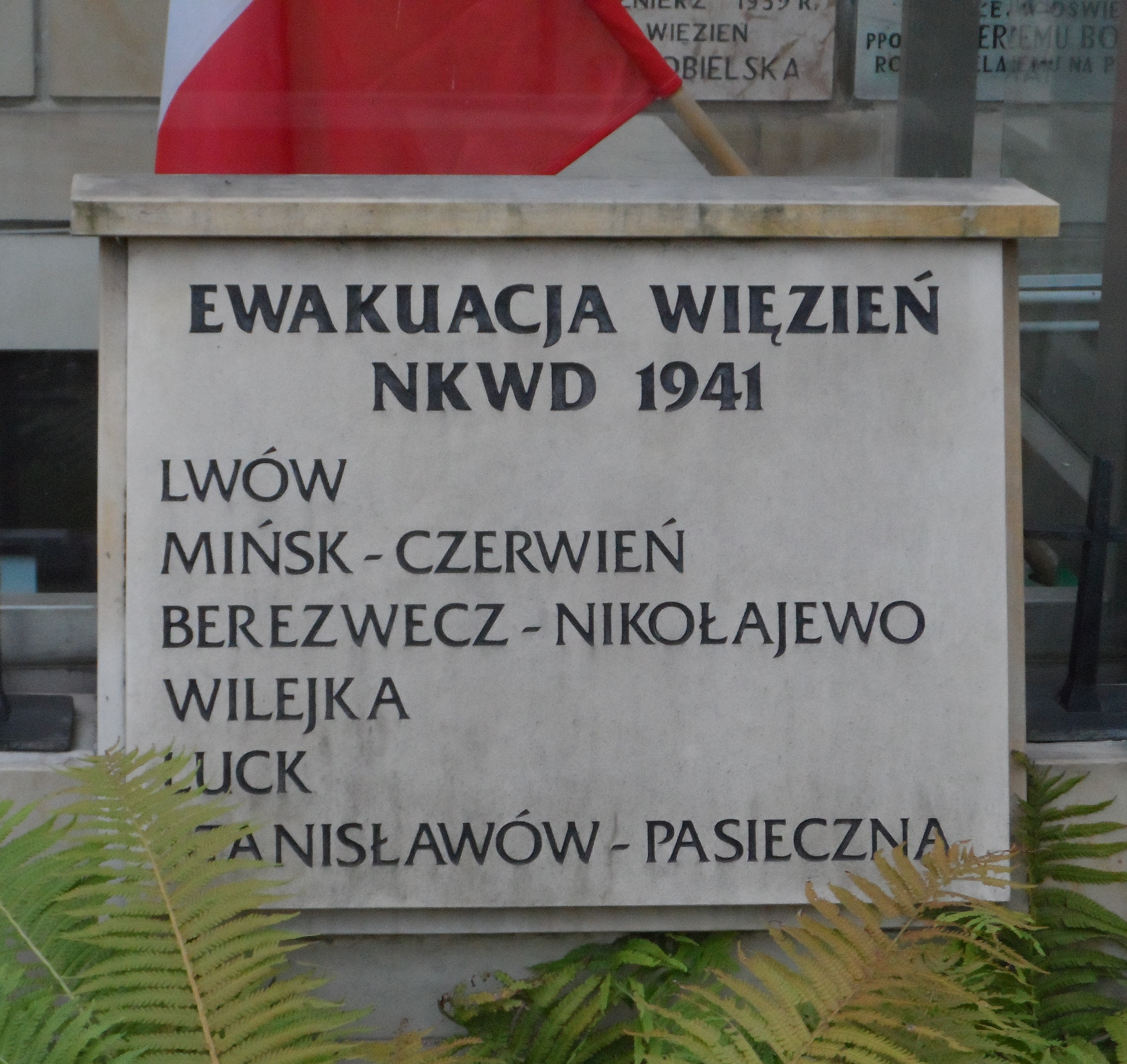
A plaque at the St. Stanislaus Kostka Church in Warsaw commemorates the victims of the NKVD prisoner massacres, including the victims of the Minsk-Chervyen "death road"

== Commemoration ==
The first commemoration of the massacre at the location occurred in July 1990 when Lithuanian activists erected a wayside shrine and Belarusians a memorial cross. Already in 1990, a Koplytstulpis by sculptor Ipolitas Užkurnys was erected there, commemorating the Lithuanian victims. At the same time, a cross commemorating the Belarusian victims was unveiled.

As long as the Soviet Union existed and Poland was under communist rule, researching and commemorating the crimes was impossible. The official version given by the Soviet authorities was that the prisoners were murdered by a "German airborne force."

The situation changed after the revolutions of 1989 and the collapse of the USSR. Starting in 1990, at the initiative of Belarusian independence groups, anniversary ceremonies were organised in Chervyen to commemorate the victims of the death march. A memorial site was established at the "Cegielnia" site, where in June 1941, NKVD officers shot approximately 700 men brought from Chervyen prison. On June 25, 2000, a small monument commemorating the Polish victims was unveiled at the "Cegielnia." It was created through the efforts of the Council for the Protection of Struggle and Martyrdom Sites and the Association "Polish Community", and was created by sculptor Genadzi Matusewicz. It takes the form of a chapel with a wooden sculpture depicting the Mother of God taking Christ down from the cross. Construction of the monument encountered numerous obstacles from the Belarusian authorities. This prevented, among other things, the placement of a boulder with an inscription and an image of a white eagle next to the chapel. The memorial site also includes other sculptures and crosses commemorating the victims of the crime.

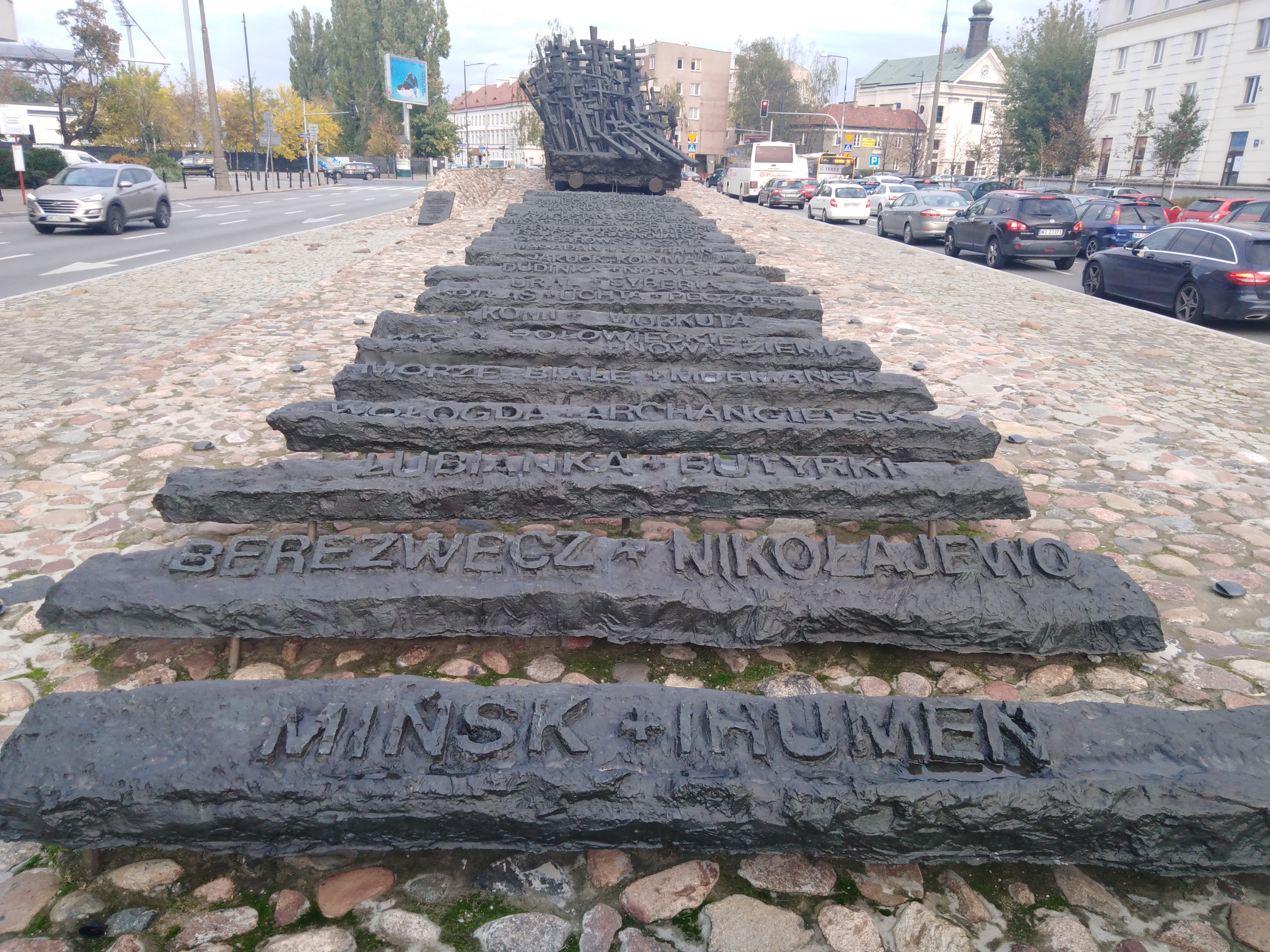
Monument to the Fallen and Murdered in the East in Warsaw. Railway sleeper with the inscription "Mińsk Ihumeń"

One of the elements of the Monument to the Fallen and Murdered in the East in Warsaw is a railroad tie with the inscription "Mińsk Ihumeń". (Note: Until 1923, Cherven was called Ihumeń.)

The death march from Minsk to Chervyen is mentioned in one of the inscriptions on the plaque commemorating the victims of the NKVD prison massacres, which is located on the grounds of the Church of St. Stanislaus Kostka in Warsaw.

== Bibliography ==
=== Lithuanian sources ===
- Čerškus, Leonas. "Lietuvos kario atsiminimai" (in Lithuanian).
- Končius, Ignas (1993). Kelionė į Červenę ir atgal (PDF) (in Lithuanian). Vilnius: Viliaus Užtupo leidykla "Vilius". ISBN 9986-425-00-X.
- Petruitis, Jonas (1990). Kaip jie mus sušaudė (PDF) (in Lithuanian). Vilnius: Periodika. OCLC 55796150. (originally published in 1942, 2nd edition in 1944, republished in 1952 and 2003; Italian translation published in 1948 and 1968)
- Tumas, Juozas (1990). Kelias i Červenę. Atsiminimai (PDF) (in Lithuanian). Vilnius: Poligrafija. OCLC 225488434. (originally published in 1957 in magazine Karys)
- Stungurys, Stasys (1991). "Šiurpi klajonė: Červenės tragediją prisimenant". Pozicija (in Lithuanian). 48.
- Anušauskas, Arvydas (1996). Lietuvių tautos sovietinis naikinimas 1940–1958 metais (in Lithuanian). Vilnius: Mintis. pp. 118–121. ISBN 5-417-00713-7.
- LGGRTC (17 June 2011). "Politinių kalinių žudynės Červenėje" (PDF). Atmintinos datos (in Lithuanian). Lietuvos gyventojų genocido ir rezistencijos tyrimo centras.
- LRS (2015). "Červenės žudynės" (in Lithuanian). Lietuvos Respublikos Seimo kanceliarija. Archived from the original on 28 June 2015.

=== Polish sources ===
- Lipińska, Grażyna (2005). Jeśli zapomnę o nich. (in Polish). Warszawa: Politechnika Warszawska. ISBN 83-7207-565-4.
- Musiał, Bogdan (2001). Rozstrzelać elementy kontrrewolucyjne. Brutalizacja wojny niemiecko-sowieckiej latem 1941 roku (in Polish). Warszawa: Stowarzyszenie Kulturalne Fronda. ISBN 83-88747-40-1.
- Popiński, Krzysztof; Kokurin, Aleksandr; Gurjanow, Aleksandr (1995). Drogi śmierci. Ewakuacja więzień sowieckich z Kresów Wschodnich II Rzeczypospolitej w czerwcu i lipcu 1941 (in Polish). Warszawa: Wydawnictwo „Karta”. ISBN 83-900676-9-2.
- Prawdzic-Szlaski, Janusz (1989). Nowogródczyzna w walce 1940–1945 (in Polish). Szczecin: Errata.
- Solonin, Mark (2015). Czerwiec 1941. Ostateczna diagnoza (in Polish). Poznań: Dom Wydawniczy Rebis. ISBN 978-83-7818-616-8.
- Stankiewicz-Januszczak, Joanna (2002). Dziś mówię ludziom, co mówiłam Bogu (in Polish). Gdynia: ASP Rymsza. ISBN 83-914184-9-9.
- Stankiewicz-Januszczak, Joanna (1999). Marsz śmierci. Ewakuacja więźniów z Mińska do Czerwieni 24–27 czerwca 1941 r (in Polish). Warszawa: Oficyna Wydawnicza Volumen i Rada Ochrony Pamięci Walk i Męczeństwa. ISBN 83-7233-192-8.
- Wnuk, Rafał (2007). "Za pierwszego Sowieta". Polska konspiracja na Kresach Wschodnich II Rzeczypospolitej (wrzesień 1939 – czerwiec 1941) (in Polish). Warszawa: Instytut Pamięci Narodowej i Instytut Studiów Politycznych PAN. ISBN 978-83-60464-47-2.
- Osiński, Robert (9 July 2018). "Postanowienie o umorzeniu śledztwa o sygn. akt S 57.2009.Zk" (PDF). szczecin.ipn.gov.pl (in Polish).
- Mikoda, Janina (1997). Zbrodnicza ewakuacja więzień i aresztów NKWD na Kresach Wschodnich II Rzeczypospolitej w czerwcu – lipcu 1941 roku. Materiały z sesji naukowej w 55. rocznicę ewakuacji więźniów NKWD w głąb ZSRR, Łódź 10 czerwca 1996 r (in Polish). Warszawa: GKBZpNP-IPN. ISBN 83-903356-6-2.

=== Other ===
- Parrish, Michael (1996). The Lesser Terror: Soviet State Security, 1939-1953. Greenwood Publishing Group. p. 48. ISBN 0-275-95113-8.
