= Smilavitski rural council =

Smilavitski rural council is a lower-level subdivision (selsoviet) of Chervyen district, Minsk region, Belarus.
