= Vladas Nagevičius =

Lithuanian brigadier general, physician, archaeologist and museologist

Brigadier general Vladas Nagevičius
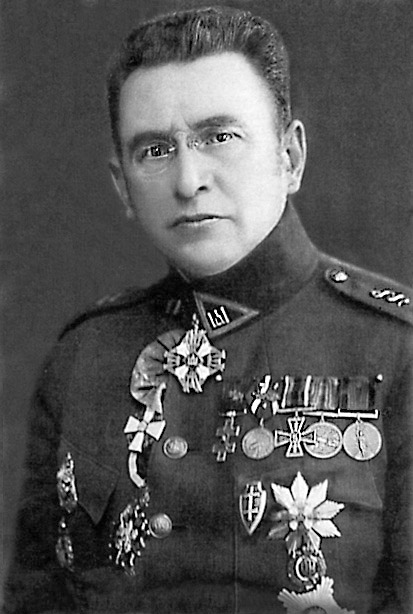
- Nagevičius photographed with uniform of the Lithuanian Army and state awards
- Born: 17 June 1880; Kretinga, Kovno Governorate, Russian Empire
- Died: 15 September 1954 (aged 74); Willoughby, Ohio, United States
- Burial place: Kretinga, Lithuania (reburied)
- Alma mater: Saint Petersburg Institute of Archeology (1904); Saint Petersburg Military Medical Academy (1910)
- Military career
- Allegiance: Imperial Russian Army (1910–1917); Lithuanian Armed Forces (1918–1940); Lithuanian Activist Front (1941); Lithuanian Territorial Defense Force (1944)
- Service years: 1910–1944
- Rank: Brigadier general
- Awards: Knight's Cross of the Order of the Cross of Vytis (1920); Medal of Independence of Lithuania (1928); Commander's Grand Cross of the Order of the Lithuanian Grand Duke Gediminas (1928); Commander's Grand Cross of the Order of Vytautas the Great (1936)
- Other work: Archaeologist, museologist

Vladas Nagevičius-Nagius (17 June 1880 – 15 September 1954) was a Lithuanian brigadier general, physician, archaeologist, museologist. He is the founder of the Vytautas the Great War Museum.

== Early years ==
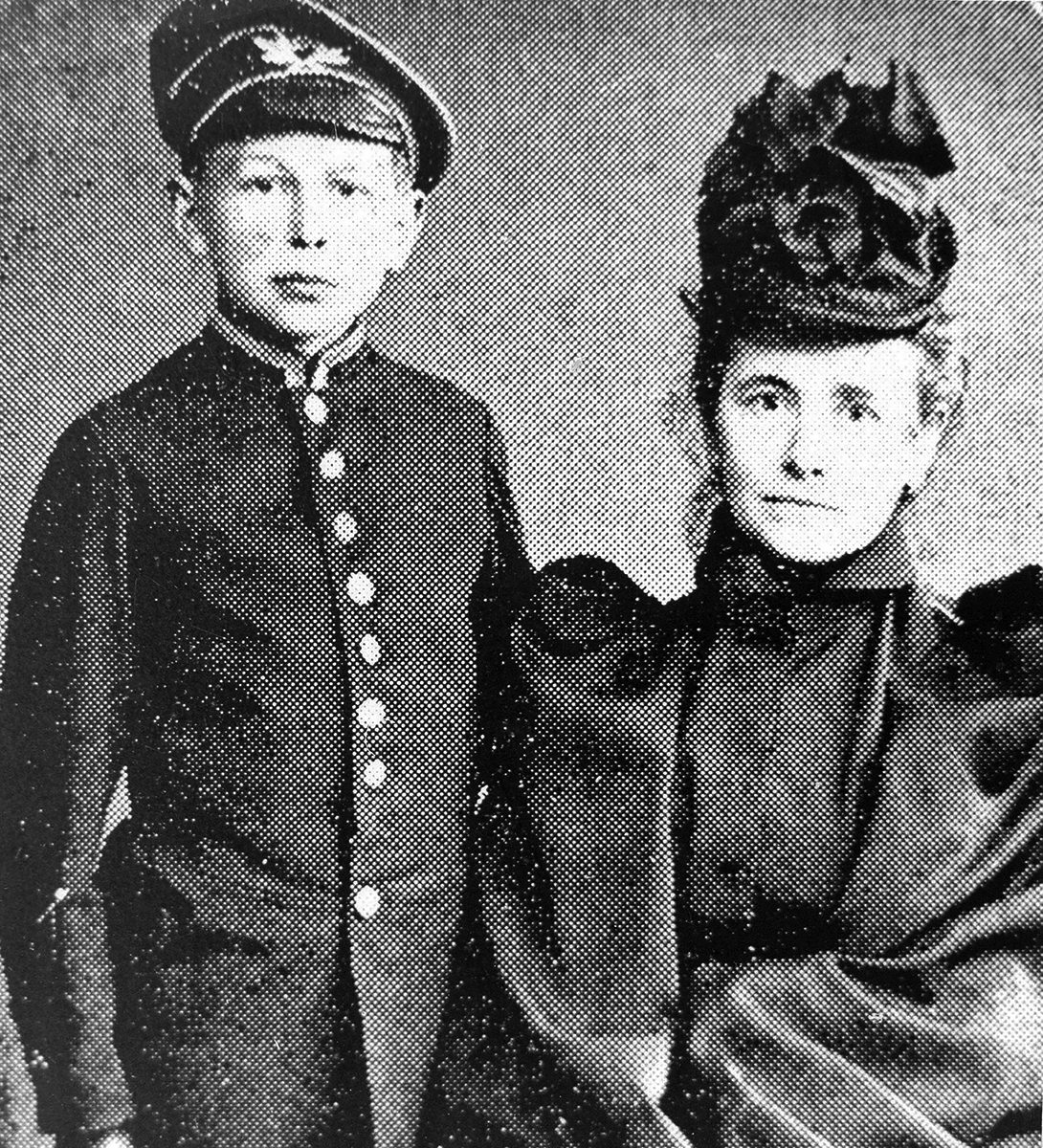
Nagevičius with his mother (circa 1890)

Nagevičius was born in Kretinga, then part of the Russian Empire, on 17 June 1880. He was born in a family of a Samogitian noble Vladislovas Nagevičius who worked as a customs officer. His mother Marija Magdalena Eitavičiūtė owned a bookstore in Kretinga. Two sisters of Nagevičius died as children. His father died soon after he was born. After receiving his primary education in Kretinga, Nagevičius studied at Palanga Progymnasium but was expelled for refusing to participate in Orthodox Church prayers. He continued his studies at the Alexander Gymnasium in Riga, where he became involved in Lithuanian activities through Kipras Bielinis.

He graduated from the Saint Petersburg Institute of Archeology in 1904 and became one of the first professional Lithuanian archaeologists. He participated in the 1905 Russian Revolution and in 1905–1906 was imprisoned in Kaunas and Šiauliai for the distribution of proclamations by the Great Seimas of Vilnius.

On 7 April 1907, he participated in the first meeting of the Lithuanian Scientific Society and served as a member of its board in 1918–1919. In 1908, he founded the Lithuanian medical organization Fraternitas Lituanica, which aim was to preserve Lithuanian identity.

Nagevičius graduated from the Saint Petersburg Military Medical Academy in 1910. In 1910–1917, he served as a physician in the Baltic and Black Sea Fleets of the Imperial Russian Navy.

Prior to World War I, he researched ancient cemeteries of Kartena, Kiauleikiai, Kretinga, Maciuičiai, Norgėlai, Pociai, Pryšmančiai, Senkai, Skomantai, Šateriai, Viekšniai.

== Interwar Lithuania ==
In 1918, after returning to Lithuania, Nagevičius joined the Lithuanian Armed Forces as a volunteer. He actively participated in the creation of the Lithuanian Armed Forces. In 1918–1940, he was Chief of the Army Sanitary Service. He founded the Sanitary Non-commissioned Officers School, the Higher Military Sanitation Courses, and the Officers' Club. He participated in international military medicine congresses. In 1920, for merits in creating the Lithuanian Armed Forces, he received the homestead of Babtynas Manor with 20 hectares of land. He named the manor Žemaitkiemis and established an exemplary farm known for breeding horses. In the Polonized Babtai District, he cherished Lithuanian national traditions and organized celebrations of Joninės every year, which were attended by Kaunas' intelligentsia and state leaders.

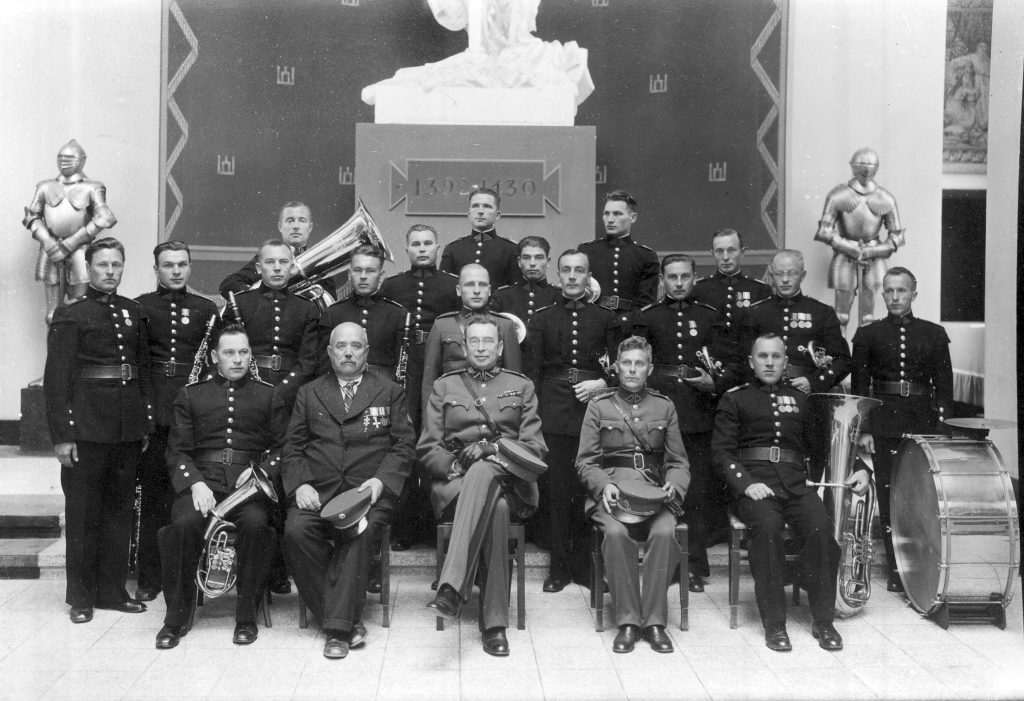
Vladas Nagevičius (center) at the Vytautas the Great War Museum in Kaunas during the interwar period

Nagevičius conducted research of the prehistory of Lithuania. In 1919, he became a member of the State Commission on Archeology. He participated in the Second Baltic Congress of Archaeologists (1932), 1st and 2nd International Congresses of Archaeologists (1932, 1936). In 1921, he founded the Vytautas the Great War Museum and a memorial garden near it which he headed until 1940 and in 1941–1944.

In 1931–34, he researched the hillforts of Apuolė and Įpiltis, as well as the cemetery of Apuolė. He read a report on the results of the research of the Pryšmančiai cemetery in Riga, and on the research of Apuolė in London. In 1935, he published a book Mūsų pajūrio medžiaginė kultūra VIII–XIII amžiuje (Material Culture of Our Coast in the 8–13th Centuries). In 1933, he became a correspondent member of the Latvian Academy of Sciences. In 1933, he gave a lecture on the prehistory of Lithuania at the Society of Historians and Archaeologists in Stockholm.

He was one of the founders of the Lithuanian Seamen's Union in 1923 and of a committee to assist the war invalids in 1924. He not only cared of the treatment of the wounded soldiers and their orthotics, but also set up workshops where they could learn crafts. Moreover, he assembled a brass band and the honorary guard of the War Museum from the war invalids. Under his care in 1925, the Women's Association of Officers' Families of Duchess Birutė was created. Nagevičius was the head of the Lithuanian Army Medical Corps.

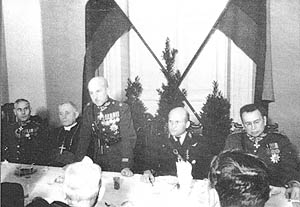
Vincas Vitkauskas, Teofilius Matulionis, Stasys Raštikis, Antanas Gustaitis, and Nagevičius in 1940

In Kaunas, he married Veronika Baronaitė and they adopted Leonas Nagevičius, his cousin's son. On 30 July 1940, he dropped Polish suffix from his last name and became known as Vladas Nagius.

== Occupations and World War II ==
Following the Soviet occupation of Lithuania in 1940, Nagevičius participated in the June Uprising of 1941. He was as an adviser to the Kaunas staff of the anti-Soviet resistance organization Lithuanian Activist Front (LAF), and together with other representatives of the LAF (e.g. Stasys Pundzevičius) signed a memorandum Apie Lietuvos būklę pradėjus veikti vokiečių civilinei valdžiai Lietuvoje (English: About the state of Lithuania after the beginning of the German civilian government in Lithuania).

During the German occupation of Lithuania, he protected the valuables of the War Museum and tried to get permission to celebrate anniversaries of the Act of Independence of Lithuania on February 16.

In 1944, he was one of the creators of the Lithuanian Territorial Defense Force.

== Emigration ==
In 1944, Nagevičius emigrated to Austria and settled in the Lithuanian refugee camp in Vorarlberg. In 1949, he moved to the United States and lived in Ohio and Cleveland. He died in Willoughby, Ohio in 1954.

== Legacy ==
On 18 June 1991, to commemorate the 110th birth anniversary of Nagevičius, a memorial plaque with a bas-relief was unveiled in the lobby of the Vytautas the Great War Museum (sculptor Algirdas Bosas). On 15 September 1991, a memorial plaque with a bas-relief was unveiled on his former house in the center of Kaunas (K. Donelaičio str. 75).

In 1995, remains of Nagevičius and his wife were transported to Lithuania and reburied in his birthplace – the old parish cemetery of Kretinga where the entire Nagevičiai family is buried.

In 1997, the former Vijūkų Street in the Romainiai district of Kaunas was named after him.
