= Chervyen =

Town in Minsk Region, Belarus

Chervyen Чэрвень (Belarusian) Червень (Russian)
- Town
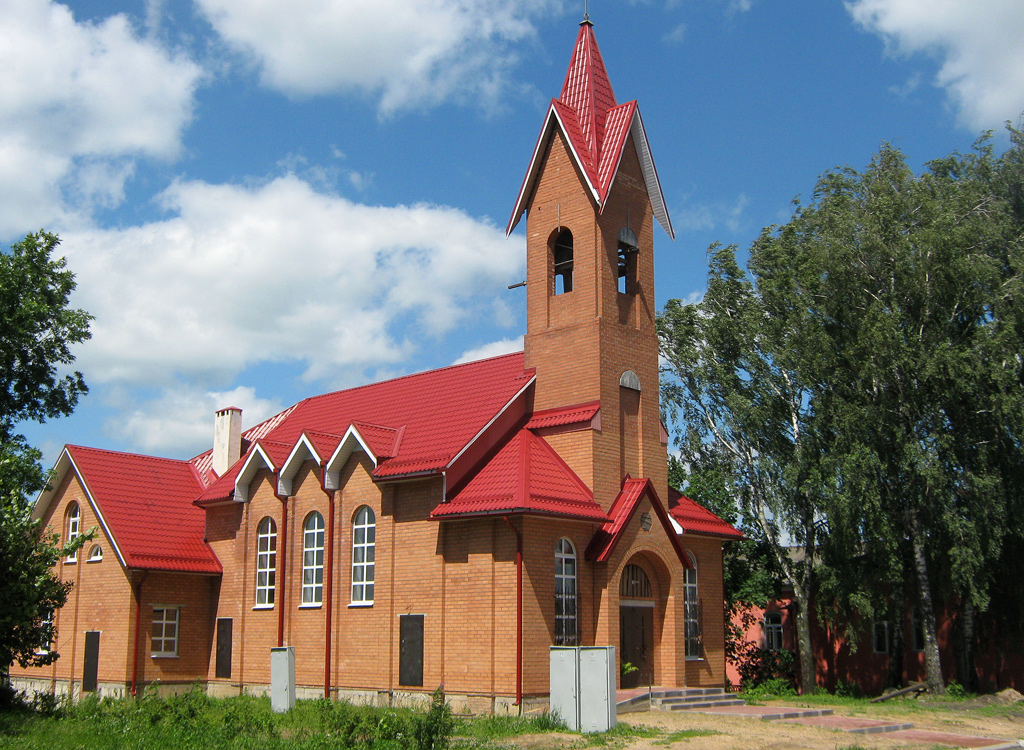
- Church

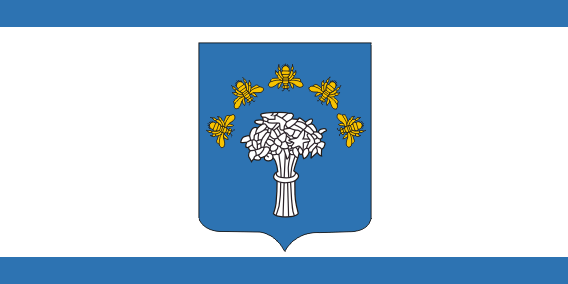
- Flag Coat of arms

- Location within Belarus
- Coordinates: 53°42′28″N 28°25′56″E
- Country: Belarus
- Region: Minsk Region
- District: Chervyen District
- Founded: 1387
- Elevation: 160 m (520 ft)

Population (2026)
  - Total: 10,617
- Time zone: UTC+3 (MSK)
- Postal code: 223232
- Area code: +375 1714
- License plate: 5
- Website: Official website

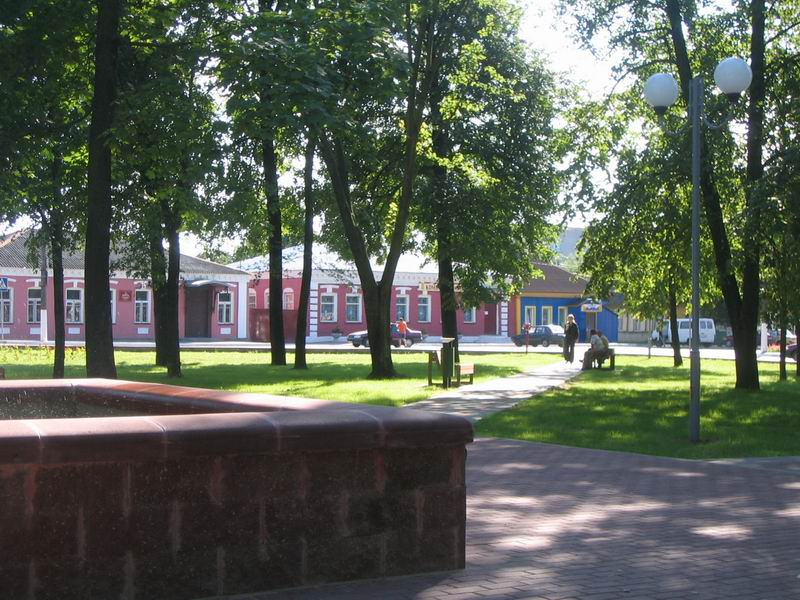
Town's central park

Chervyen or Cherven, (Note: Belarusian: Чэрвень, romanized: Červień, IPA: [ˈtʂɛrvʲenʲ]; Russian: Червень; Polish: Czerwień; Lithuanian: Červenė.) previously known as Ihumen (Note: Belarusian: Ігумен; Russian: Игумен.) until 1923, is a town in Minsk Region, Belarus. It serves as the administrative center of Chervyen District. In 2016, its population was 9,718. As of 2026, it has a population of 10,617.

== History ==
On 25–27 June 1941, the Soviet NKVD carried out a mass execution of political prisoners from Minsk in the nearby Tsagelnya forest. Wooden statue Mourning Angel, by sculptor Gennady Matusevich, was erected at the location. Commemorative events are held there every year in June.

On 1 February 1942, the German forces and local policemen surrounded the Cherven ghetto. At the same time, other Jews living outside the ghetto walls, such as in the local hospital, were gathered together. They were ordered to undress to their undergarments and lie on the ground, where they were shot dead. Witnesses put the number of victims at between 1,500 and 1,750 people. The murder operation was carried out by the Einsatzkommando 8 unit of Einsatzgruppe B, with the help of local policemen.

== Geography ==
Located 66 kilometres (41 mi) east of Minsk and 45 kilometres (28 mi) west of Berezino, Chervyen lies on a plain in the middle of its district. It is crossed to the north by the M4 highway Minsk-Mogilev. The national road P59 links it with the town of Smalyavichy (50 kilometres (31 mi) north) and the Minsk National Airport (65 kilometres (40 mi) north).

== Notable people ==
- Vladimir Isaacovich Fundator (1903–86), metallurgist who invented the technology which made possible the aluminum diesel engine for the T-34 tank, thus facilitating the rapid advance of the Red Army in World War 2; recipient USSR Council of Ministers Prize.
- David Golub (1901–2001), Belarusian anatomist, Doctor of Medical Sciences. His main scientific works were on the anatomy and embryology of the nervous and vascular systems of humans and animals. He identified the main patterns of development of the peripheral nervous system.
- Leivik Halpern (1888–1962), Yiddish poet and literary editor who under the pen name H Leivik wrote The Golem, among other works.
- David Nisnevich (1893–1963), composer of Russian and Yiddish folk songs.
- Lieutenant Semion Gurevich (1915–1984), distinguished himself by leading a Red Army attack across the Dnieper River in September 1943, for which he received the title Hero of the Soviet Union.
- Professor David Movshevitch Golub (1901–2001), distinguished anatomist and embryologist; Academician of the National Academy of Sciences of Belarus; recipient Red Banner of Labour.
- Professor Feival Movshevitch Golub, brother of David, headed the Department of Surgical Diseases, Samarkand State Medical Institute, Uzbekistan; recipient Honorary Scientist of the Uzbek Soviet Socialist Republic.
- Vladimir Adomovich Korol (1912–1980), architect involved in the plans to rebuild Minsk after the destruction of World War 2; received Order of Lenin.
- Oleg Novitskiy (b. 1971), Russian cosmonaut.
- Valery Shary (b. 1947), Olympic light-heavyweight weightlifting champion.
- Mikhail Stanyuta (1881–1974), Belarusian Soviet painter, portraitist, graphic artist, and teacher. He worked primarily in easel painting (thematic paintings, portraits, landscapes, still lifes) and graphics.
- Kim Tesakov (1936–2018), Belarusian composer, Honored Artist of the Republic of Belarus. Tesakov's music is characterized by the grandeur of figurative and dramatic generalization, drawing on folk song traditions. He is known as the developer of the original genre of radio opera.
