= Chervyen district =

District of Minsk region, Belarus

Chervyen district Чэрвеньскі раён (Belarusian) Червенский район (Russian)
- District
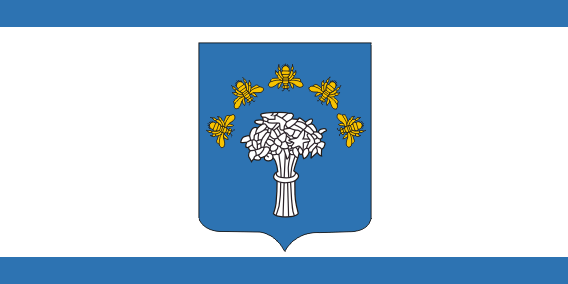
- Flag Coat of arms

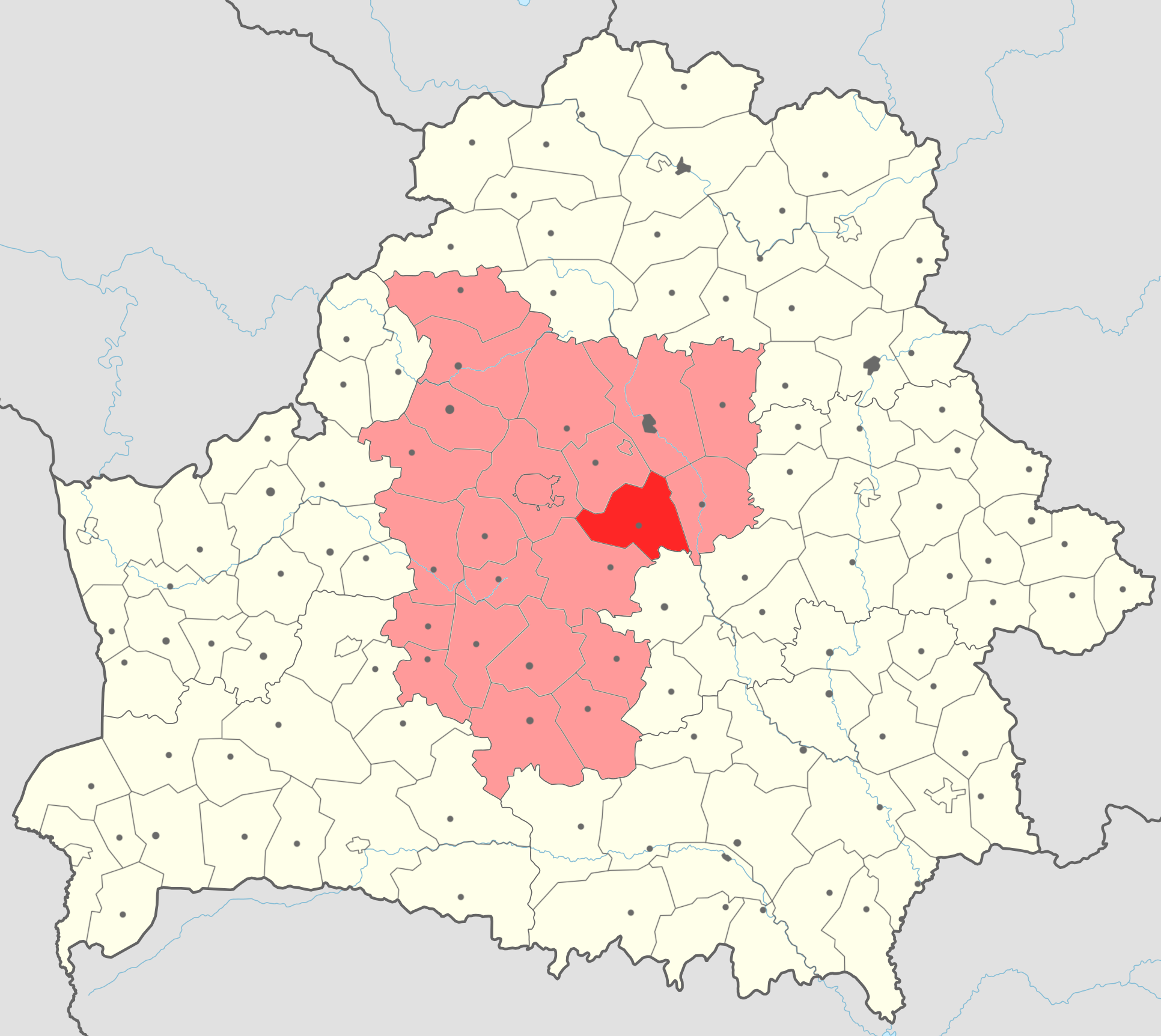
- Coordinates: 53°42′28″N 28°25′56″E
- Country: Belarus
- Region: Minsk region
- Administrative center: Chervyen

Area
  - District: 1,600 km^{2} (620 sq mi)

Population (2024)
  - District: 33,401
  - Density: 21/km^{2} (54/sq mi)
  - Urban: 17,131
  - Rural: 16,270
- Time zone: UTC+3 (MSK)
- Website: Cherven ispolkom website

Chervyen district or Červień district (Belarusian: Чэрвеньскі раён; Russian: Червенский район) is a district (raion) of Minsk region in Belarus. Its administrative center is Chervyen. As of 2024, it has a population of 33,401.

== Rural councils ==
Chervyen rural council, Kalodzyezhski rural council, Klinotski rural council, Lyadski rural council, Ravanitski rural council, Rudnyanski rural council, Chervyen district, Smilavitski rural council, Valevachski rural council

== Notable residents ==
- Stanisław Moniuszko (1819, Ubel village – 1872), Polish and Belarusian composer
