= Žarėnai Eldership =

Eldership of Lithuania

Žarėnai, Telšiai District, Lithuania

The Žarėnai Eldership (Lithuanian: Žarėnų seniūnija) is an eldership of Lithuania, located in the Pakruojis District Municipality. In 2021 its population was 1662.
