= Rudnyanski rural council, Chervyen district =

Rudnyanski rural council is a lower-level subdivision (selsoviet) of Chervyen district, Minsk region, Belarus. Its capital is Rudnya, Chervyen district.
