= Giedrius Kuprevičius =

Lithuanian composer and music educator (born 1944)

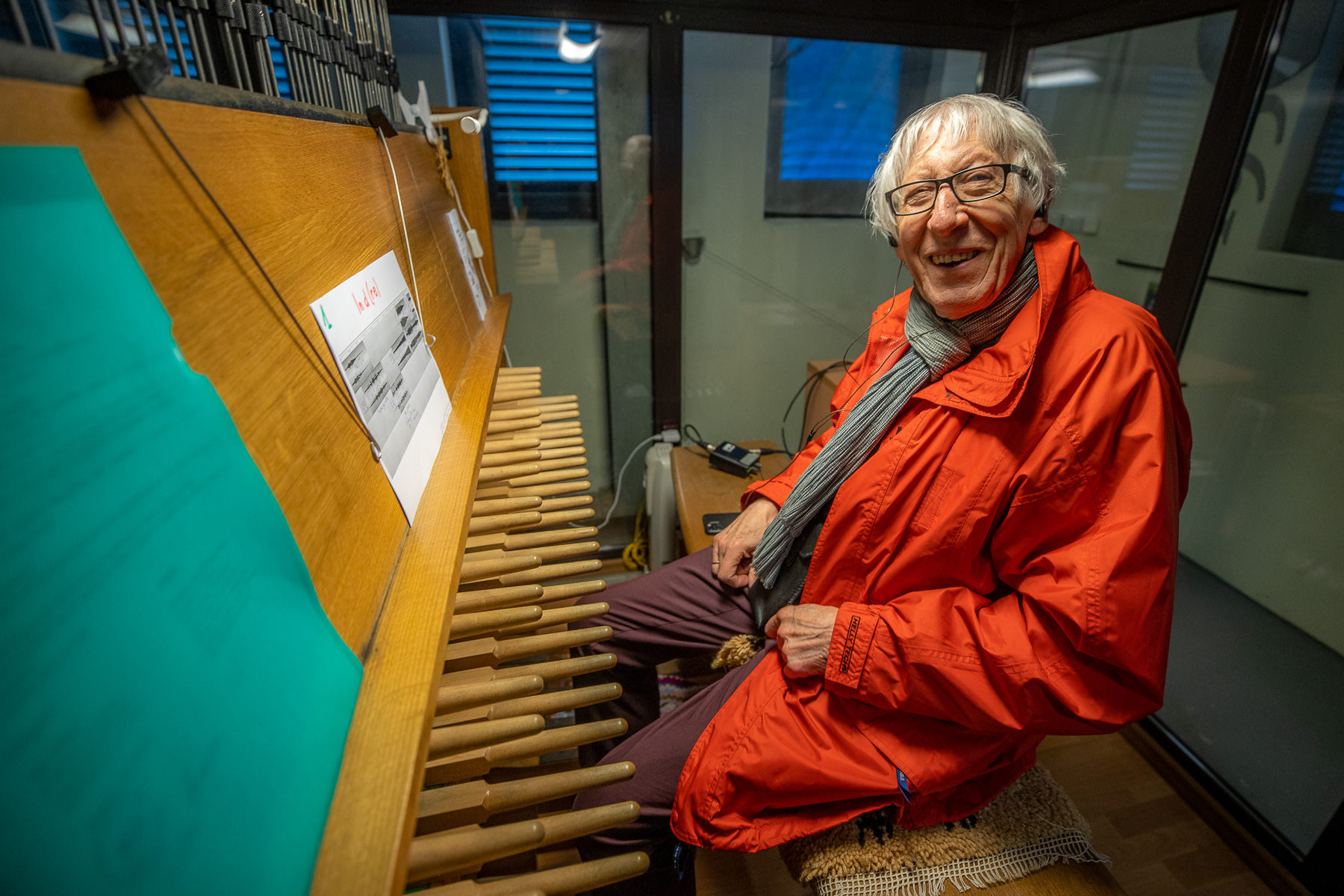
Giedrius Kuprevičius near console of Kaunas Carillon

Giedrius Antanas Kuprevičius (born April 8, 1944 in Kaunas) is a Lithuanian composer and music educator.

== Life ==
Giedrius Kuprevičius graduated from Prof. Eduardas Balsys' composition class at the Lithuanian Academy of Music in 1968. From 1966 to 1975 he taught at the Juozas Gruodis Higher School of Music; he was also head of music faculties at both the Lithuanian Agricultural, and Kaunas Technology University, taught acting courses at the Vilnius University, and organized a music improvisation course at the Kaunas Faculty of the Lithuanian Academy of Music. He taught at the Art Faculty of Vytautas Magnus University during 1990-1999, and in 2000 was appointed deacon of the Art Faculty at Kaunas Technology University; he was responsible for the founding, in 2001, of the Audio and Video Technology Center at this University, which now also has a Computer Music Club. The composer's numerous contributions to methodological literature include a work entitled "Music in Theatre". From 1971 to 1982, Giedrius Kuprevičius headed the Kaunas branch of the Lithuanian Composers' Union, and from 1980 to 1987 - the Kaunas Musical Theatre's "Argo" electronic music group. He worked as chief editor of music programming at Lithuanian Television during 1987-1988. He has played the Kaunas Carillon since 1957, and in 1998 was appointed Kaunas City head carillonist. His official posts have included: First Assistant to the Lithuanian Minister of Culture, and Executive Head of Artistic Affairs (1988-1990), and Kaunas municipality deputy mayor (1992-1993). In 2012, he was awarded the Golden Star of the Lithuanian Copyright Association LATGA and elected as the full member of the Lithuanian Academy of Sciences. In 2014 Giedrius Kuprevičius was awarded the Lithuanian National Arts and Culture Prize, the highest artistic distinction in Lithuania. The composer has been involved with the Lithuanian press since 1968, and continues to write on music and culture in various periodicals. He has published two books of essays: "Backward Years" and "It's Been Said". Giedrius Kuprevičius takes part in music festivals, conferences, and symposia in Lithuania and abroad. His musical, Fire Hunt with Beaters, was produced in Lithuania, Latvia, Estonia, Russia, Ukraine, and Moldova. His oratorio, "Creation of the World for the End of the 20th Century", was performed at the Kaunas Jazz festival in 1988, EXPO-2000 in Hanover, and at an international forum in Vienna. Others of his works have been heard at concerts in various countries in Europe, as well as in America, Australia, and New Zealand.

Giedrius Kuprevičius' music is moderately modern, based mostly on melodic development and augmentation of rhythmic patterns. Many of his works are notably dominated by improvisational element and vivid ties to literature and visual arts. The composer also writes for theatre and film.

== Career ==
Giedrius Kuprevičius was a chief of Lithuanian Composers' Unity for eleven years and was appointed as an editor-in-chief of the music department of Lithuanian Television. He worked as the Ministry of Culture, Vice-minister and Chairman of the Culture Affairs board, and Vice-mayor of the Kaunas municipality. From 1990 to 1999, he gave lectures to the faculty of Arts at Vytautas Magnus University. He was appointed Dean of Faculty of Humanities of KTU on January 1, 2000. The book Music in Theater has been handed for printing. Series of lectures of Introduction to Music are being finished for publishing. Other lectures given or being given are as follows: Music aesthetics, Music philosophy, Mystics in music, History of European music, History of Lithuanian music, Art and civilization. Giedrius Kuprevičius works with some music programming and new technologies in the art field.

Since 1957 Giedrius Kuprevičius regularly plays the Kaunas Carillon (a set of 49 chromatically tuned bells). Concerts in New Zealand, Belgium, Germany, Poland, Netherlands, Denmark. He was a senior carillonneur of Kaunas city for a long time.

Giedrius Kuprevičius managed the band of electronic music ARGO of Kaunas Music Theatre.

Giedrius Kuprevičius have constantly been co-working with Lithuanian media, writing articles on musical publicists and cultural issues in such journals as Muzikos bara, Santara, Humanistica, Nemunas and Kauno diena since 1968. He has published two essay books – Backward Years and It Was Said. He conducted Lithuanian National TV programs Contrapunctus for a long run. He gave concerts in Lithuania and abroad constantly, took part at music festivals, congresses and symposiums. Giedrius Kuprevičius has been a Master-class director at international forums of youth music.

== Works ==
- Hunt of Mammoths – music for Kazys Saja play, staged at Kaunas Drama Theatre by Jonas Jurašas (1968);
- Pagan Cantos for the choir;
- Eight Lithuanian Folk Songs for the string quartet (1969);
- Herkus Mantas – music for the film produced by Marijonas Giedrys;
- Devynbėdžiai – musical (K. Saja play, staged at Panevėžys Drama theater by Juozas Blėdis, 1972).
- Fire Hunt with Beaters – musical (L. Jacinevičius and S. Šaltenis play staged by Dalia Tamulevičiūtė at The Youth Theater), later the opening performances of this musical were held in the theaters of Latvia, Estonia, Russia, Ukraine, Moldavia.
- There, Inside – one-act opera after the Maurice Maeterlinck's play of the same title, staged in Kaunas at The Youth music studio by Stanislovas Rubinovas (1976).
- I Send You Best Regards – musical after Violeta Palčinskaitė play staged at Kaunas Music Theater by Gintas Žilys (1986).
- Missa Catacumbae – for choir, trumpet, trombone, vibraphone, violin and violoncello (1994);
- The Prussians – an opera after Juozas Grušas's drama play Herkus Mantas, premiere staged at Klaipėda Music Theater by Nerijus Petrokas, conducted by Stasys Domarkas (1995).
- The Child of the Open Sea – a ballet after Jules Superviel's short story (1996).
- World Creation for the End of the XX Century – audiovisual oratorio for choir, saxophone, synthesizer, and Egidijus Vaškevičius computer animation.
- Songs of the Perpetual Wanderer– vocal symphony (R. Tagore's poetry) (1998);
- Queen Bona – opera (1999–2001), Sinfonia Barocco for chamber orchestra, for the international Pažaislis Music Festival (1999);
- Te Deum – concert for trombone and orchestra (2000),
- Seven Questions and Lamento of David – liturgian drama for violina solo and choir (2001),
- Lob - opera (2002),
- Kipras and Fiodoras – operetta (2003),
- DaliGala – opera-zarzuela (2004),
- Adagio Apokalypsis for 2 violini, cello and piano (2004),
- Birds are Jazz are Birds – for carillon, soprano and acoustic sounds (2004),
- Melancholic Songs for soprano and symphony orchestra (2004),
- Veronika - musical (2008),
- Čiurlionis - ballet (2013),
- Luther's Door - opera (2017),
- Symphony without Piano (2018)

== Personal life ==
Currently, Kuprevičius is a professor. member of the Lithuanian Academy of Sciences. His wife, Gražina, is an artist. Their children include a daughter Ieva, a son-in-law Andrius (an artist), and grandsons Marius and Ugnius.

In 2003, he was awarded with the Officer's Cross of the Order of the Lithuanian Grand Duke Gediminas.
