= Silvia Foti =

American journalist (born 1961)

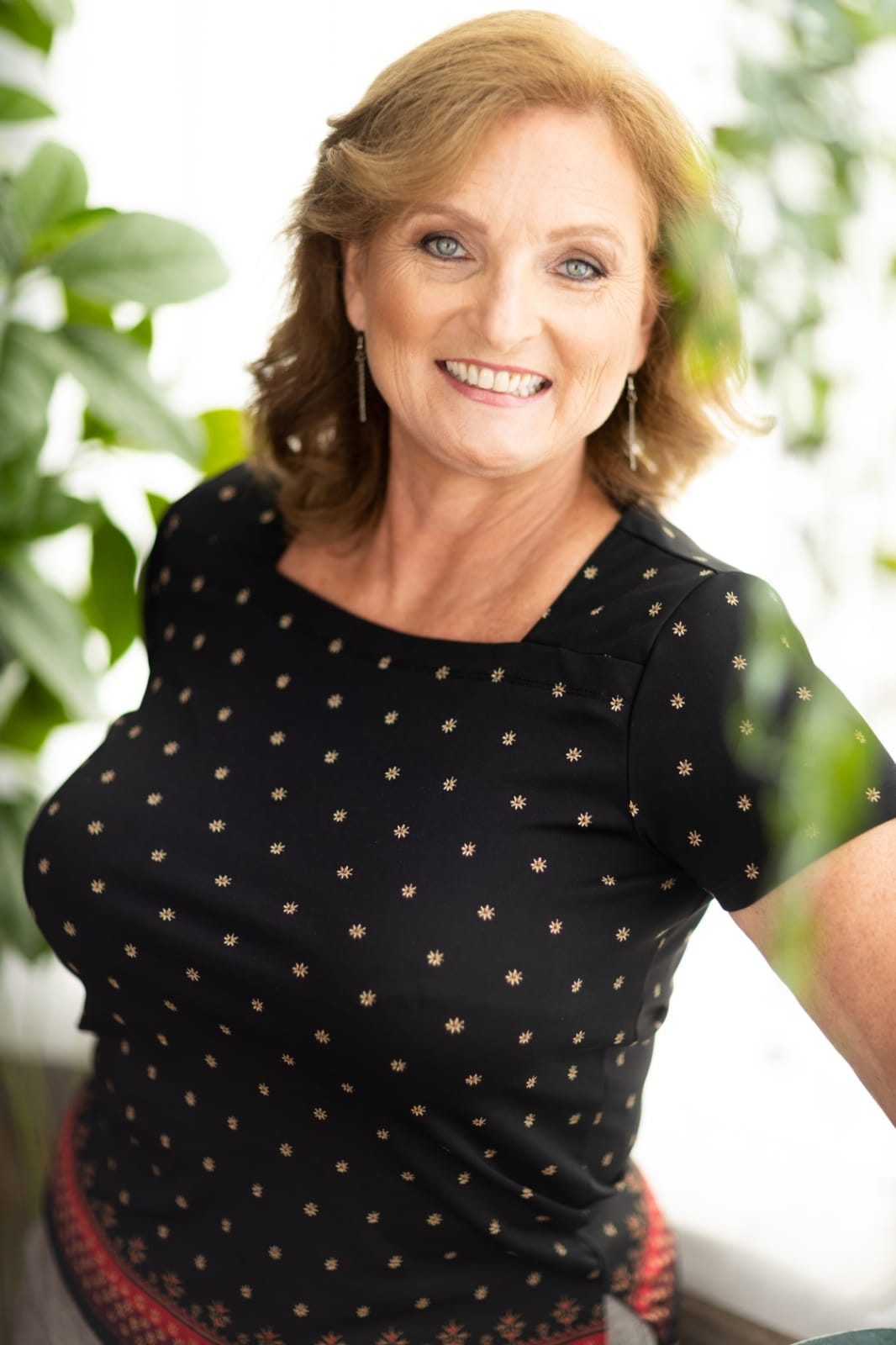
- Born: 1961 (age 64–65); Chicago, Illinois, U.S.
- Occupations: Writer, journalist, teacher
- Children: 2
- Writing career
- Language: English
- Genres: Nonfiction, mystery
- Website: silviafoti.com

Silvia Foti (born 1961) is an American journalist, writer, and teacher. Foti has written for a number of publications and published two mystery books. She has also published research on the deeds of her grandfather, Jonas Noreika, who was an alleged perpetrator in the Holocaust in Lithuania including the book The Nazi's Granddaughter: How I Discovered My Grandfather Was a War Criminal.

== Personal ==
Foti was born in 1961 in the south side of Chicago, in area known as Chicago's "Little Lithuania". Her mother was the daughter of Jonas Noreika. Foti grew up speaking Lithuanian at home, was a member of several Lithuanian groups, and attended Lithuanian Saturday school and summer camps.

Foti is fluent in English, Lithuanian, and Spanish. She met her husband in Buenos Aires in 1985, where she was freelancing for Argentine News and the Buenos Aires Herald. The couple had a daughter and a son. Their daughter died from a heroin overdose at the age of 21 in 2015. They divorced in 2021.

== Career ==
After receiving a master's degree in journalism from Northwestern University Foti moved to Buenos Aires, where she freelanced for Argentine News and the Buenos Aires Herald. After her return to Chicago, Foti worked for Academy of General Dentistry, managing AGD Impact and writing communication pieces. After leaving the AGD she started her own writing company Lotus Ink and wrote content for websites, newspaper columns, and features. She also penned two mystery novels: Skullduggery published by Creative Arts, and The Diva’s Fool published by Echelon Press, which won the 2008 Lovey Awards for Best Paranormal / SciFi / Horror.

Deciding to become a school teacher, Foti received a master's degree from National Louis University and joined the teaching staff at Proviso Mathematics and Science Academy. In parallel to teaching Foti studied for a MFA in creative nonfiction at Murray State University. Her essay The Largest Stone described as an "unsparing personal narrative" was awarded second place in the Dappled Things 2015 Jacques Maritain Prize for Nonfiction.

== Jonas Noreika ==
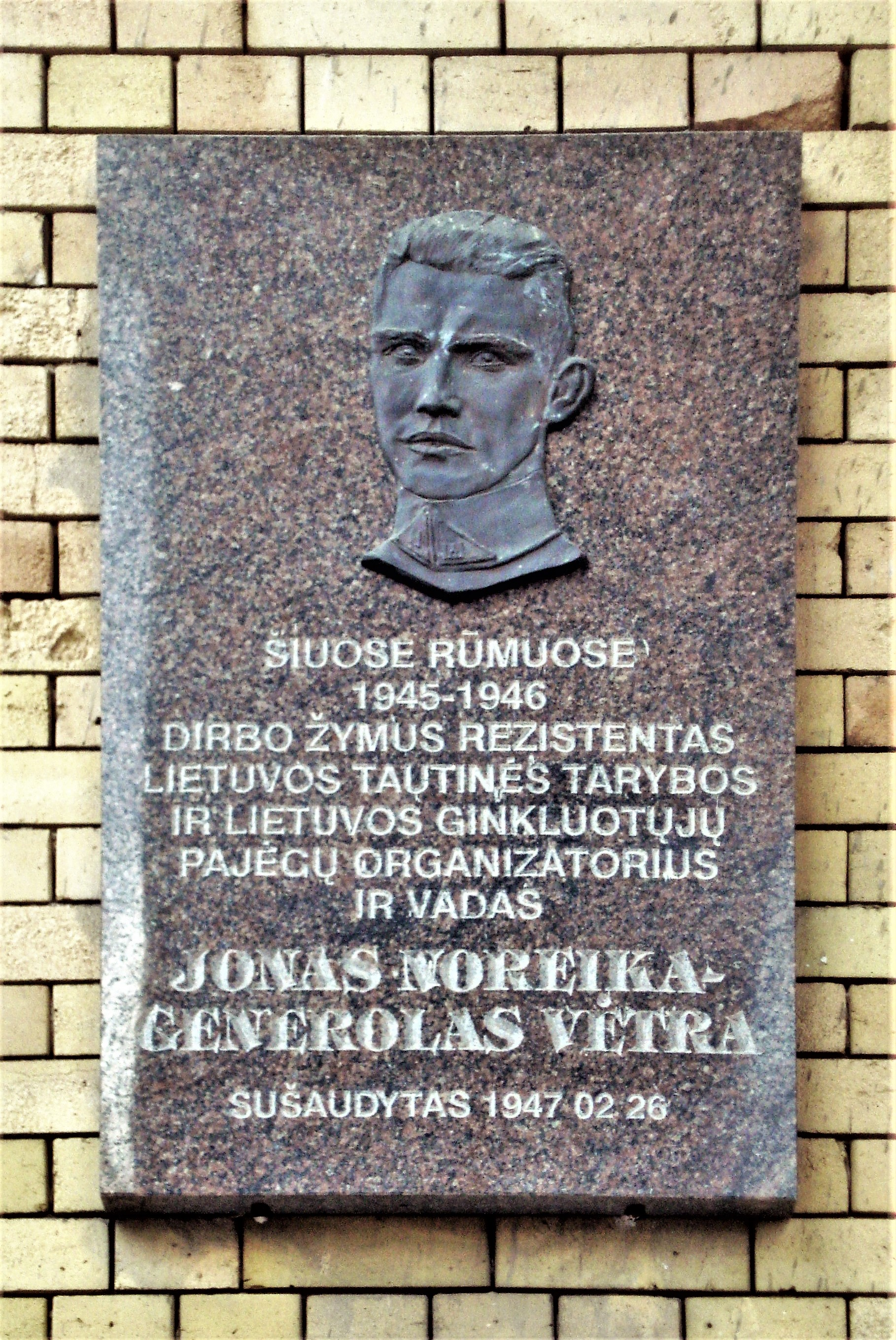
Memorial plaque for Jonas Noreika at the Library of Academy of Science in Vilnius

Foti's grandfather, Jonas Noreika is venerated as the heroic anti-Soviet General Storm in Lithuania. He is commemorated in statues and plaques, and streets have been named in his honor. Foti's mother studied for a doctorate in literature and assembled documents in order to write a book on Noreika's life, however she became sick and never completed it. According to Foti, her mother told her on her deathbed to complete the book. However, Foti's grandmother opined that Foti should "Just let history lay." In 2000 Vytautas Landsbergis, the first head of state of post-Soviet Lithuania, attended the funeral of Noreika's widow in Vilnius.

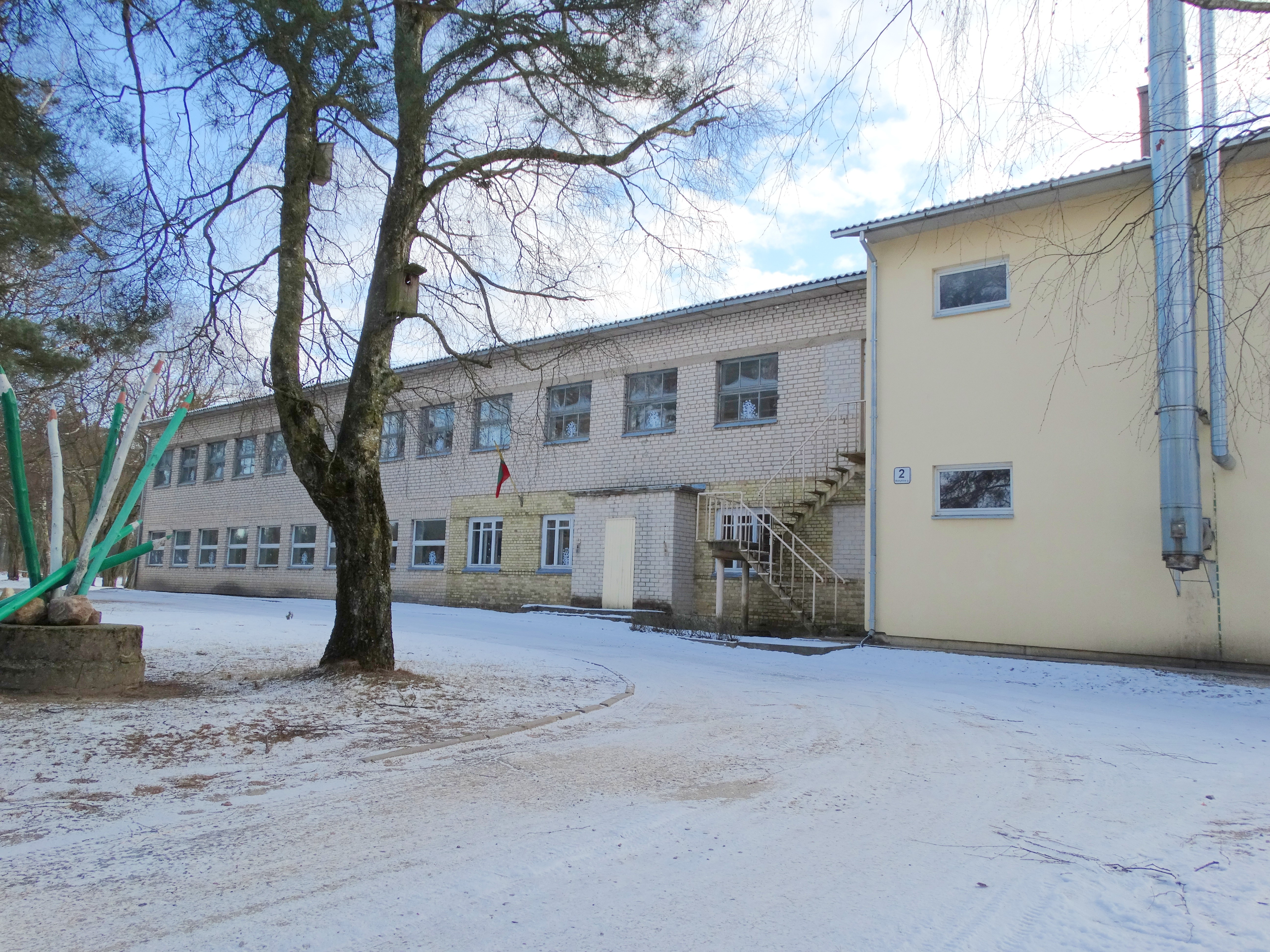
School at Šukioniai, named for Jonas Noreika

Foti, who was raised on the heroic legends of Noreika which led to respect in the Lithuanian community in Chicago, found troubling evidence of antisemitism. In a 2000 visit to Lithuania with her brother, she visited a school named for Noreika at his hometown Šukioniai. The principal told Foti that he "got a lot of grief from the Jews" for the namesake being a "Jew killer", but that "was all Soviet lies". She then learned of a 1933 pamphlet authored by her grandfather advocated boycotting the Jews. Foti's first reaction was one of shock and denial, telling The Jewish Chronicle "At first, I thought it was Russian propaganda but the evidence kept piling up".

In a 2013 visit to Lithuania she met with the director of the Genocide and Resistance Research Centre of Lithuania and queried him on Noreika, in his capacity as district chief, signing orders for the rounding up of Jews to ghettos. According to Foti, the director responded that "It is psychologically difficult to comprehend what he was thinking and feeling when he signed those papers." She consulted with Saulius Suziedelis, who "obliquely warned her about what she might find". With Holocaust guide Simon Dovidavicius, Foti retraced Noreika's path and discovered that wartime Nazi collaboration, by Noreika and many others, was an open secret.

In Lithuania, Foti met with one of her aunts who said that Noreika lived in a Plungė house that had "suddenly become free". When questioned, the aunt said that "The Jews were gone, so the house was free", and when asked on Noreika's responsibility she said "Maybe he had no choice". However, to Foti the horrific truth was self evident.

Despondent she stopped work on her manuscript and even considered burning it. However while studying creative nonfiction her instructors urged her to finish the book, focusing on Noreika's responsibility. In 2018 she published in Salon an essay on her discoveries, which was named as one of the best pieces of the year.

Based on her research, Foti wrote an affidavit in support of Grant Gochin's lawsuit against the Genocide and Resistance Research Centre. The lawsuit demanded the revocation of the certificate of good conduct during the war, issued by the centre. Gochin praised Foti, saying "Her integrity restores my faith in humanity. I hope one day, Lithuania will recognize her as a true Lithuanian hero".
