= The Holocaust in Telšiai =

Mass killing in Lithuania

The Holocaust in Telšiai (Yiddish: Telz) was carried out by the local Lithuanian leadership with occasional supervision by Nazi German units. The Jewish population in 1939 was 2,800, some 35 percent of the town's population. Additional Jews found refuge in Telšiai following the 1939 German ultimatum to Lithuania. Telšiai was taken by German troops on 25 June 1941. Jews were terrorized by the Germans and their Lithuanian collaborators and on 15–16 July all Jewish men were shot. The women were moved to a camp in Geruliai, and with the exception of 500–600 young women, were all shot on 30 August 1941. The 500–600 young women were moved back to a ghetto in Telšiai, and with the exception of some escapees, were shot on 30–31 December 1941. Of the escapees, 64 Jewish women survived.

== Background ==
In 1939, around 2,800 Jews lived in Telšiai (Yiddish: Telz), 35 percent of the population. Following the 1939 German ultimatum to Lithuania some 7,000 Jews fled Klaipėda (Memel) into Lithuania, and many found refuge in Telšiai. In June 1940, the Soviet Union occupied Lithuania including Telšiai. The Telshe Yeshiva, one of the three largest in Lithuania, was located there. In 1940 a group of students and rabbis from the yeshiva fled, reaching Cleveland, Ohio in 1941, where they reopened the yeshiva.

Germany launched Operation Barbarossa on 22 June 1941, while Lithuanian partisans engaged the Soviets in the June uprising. On 23 June 1941, Telšiai was bombed by the Germans. On the night of 24 June, following a prison uprising, the Soviets executed some 72 political prisoners in the Rainiai massacre near Telšiai. Followers of the Lithuanian Activist Front (LAF) took over the town, and started a campaign of violence against the Jews: breaking into homes, desecrating synagogues and Torah scrolls. On 25 June the German army entered Telšiai, and Major Alfonsas Svilas, a Lithuanian nationalist, was placed in charge of the town.

On 24 June, LAF regional leader Jonas Noreika, based in Plungė traveled to Telšiai to meet Svilas.

== Friday of Terror ==
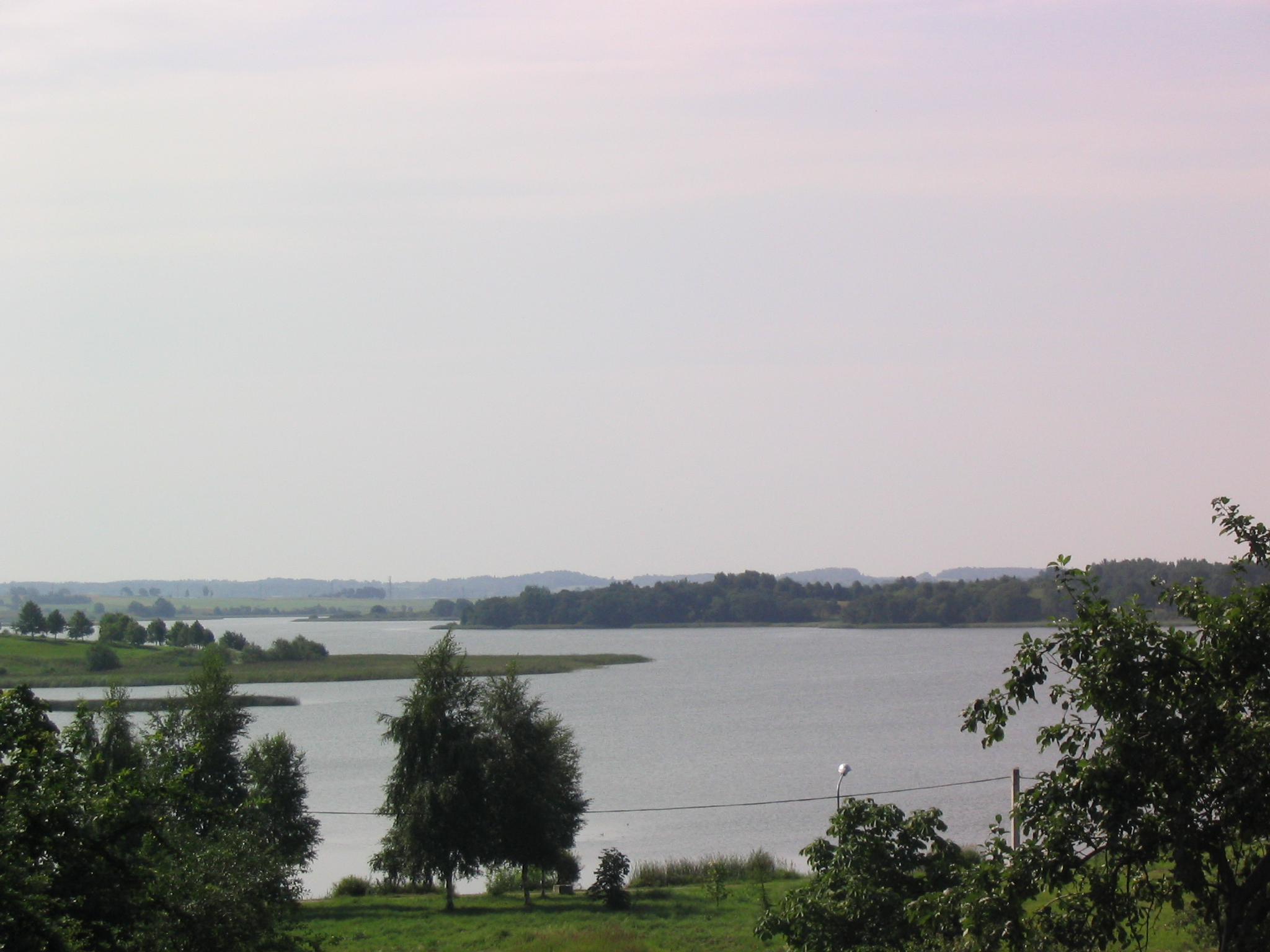
View of Lake Mastis

On 27 June 1941, known as the "Friday of Terror", all Jews were ordered to assemble in the town square and marched to the shore of Lake Mastis, where the Lithuanians proclaimed that the Jews were responsible for the Rainiai massacre. The Jews were then forced to dig up the bodies of the executed prisoners, clean and lick them, and then re-bury them. The Jewish men were then tortured.

Appeals to bishop Justinas Staugaitis, who was formerly chairman of Lithuanian parliament, were rebuffed by the bishop who told the Jews that "This is what you deserve for bringing the Bolsheviks to Lithuania", this despite the persecution of religious Jews during Soviet rule.

== Massacre of men ==
On 15–16 July 1941, the Jewish men of the town were shot. Noreika's deputy in LAF Telšiai, Bronius Juodikis, the chief of police, organized the killing, eight German SD members and about 50 Lithuanian activists participated. The Einsatzkommando 2 was active in the region.

According to testimony of a Lithuanian perpetrator, the Jews were lined up in groups of 30 to 40, ordered to undress, push the bodies of those killed previously into the pit, and then lie down on top of them. The Jews were shot in these small batches all night.

== Geruliai camp and massacre ==
The women and children of the town were moved to a camp in Geruliai, along with women from Viešvenai and Jews from smaller towns like Viešvėnai I, Rietavas, Alsėdžiai, Žarėnai, Varniai, Luokė, Laukuva and Nevarėnai. In six abandoned army barracks some 4,000 women and children lived in cramped quarters. Widespread disease led to high mortality of children. Younger women, a few hundred, were sent to work at local farms, though this often was in fact rape by the hands of their "employers". Guards made night-time selections of women for rape as well.

On 29 August 1941, with impending rumors of a coming aktion (massacre), camp commander B. Platakis offered to stave off the aktion in return for 100,000 rubles. The women collected their valuables overnight, and handed them over to Platakis.

On 30 August, some 500–600 young women were ordered to stand aside.

The rest were marched in columns of approximately 75 to Geruliai forest, thrown into pits, and shot. Some women and children were buried alive. A Soviet report estimates the death toll at the site to have been 1,580.

== Telšiai ghetto ==
The 500–600 young women were taken back to Telšiai, and housed in a ghetto on Ezero Street. Lake Mastis was on one side of the ghetto, and all other sides were fenced with a wooden fence and barbed wire. The women were forced to wear Star of David armbands, but were allowed to leave the ghetto for work and or to beg.

On 24 December 1941, some 30 Jewish women and children from the ghetto were shot at the home of the priest Dambrauskas in Alsėdžiai as a symbolic reprisal against the priest, who had tried to save Jews at the beginning of July.

Towards the end of December 1941, the women learned that the ghetto would soon be liquidated. Some women fled, finding refuge with local farmers. Some later reached the Šiauliai Ghetto.

On 30–31 December 1941, those women who remained in the ghetto were taken to Rainiai and shot.

== Aftermath ==
In total, of those women who escaped the ghetto, some 64 survived when the Soviet army liberated the area from the Nazis.

== See also ==
- Plungė massacre
