= Vytautas Landsbergis =

Lithuanian politician (born 1932)

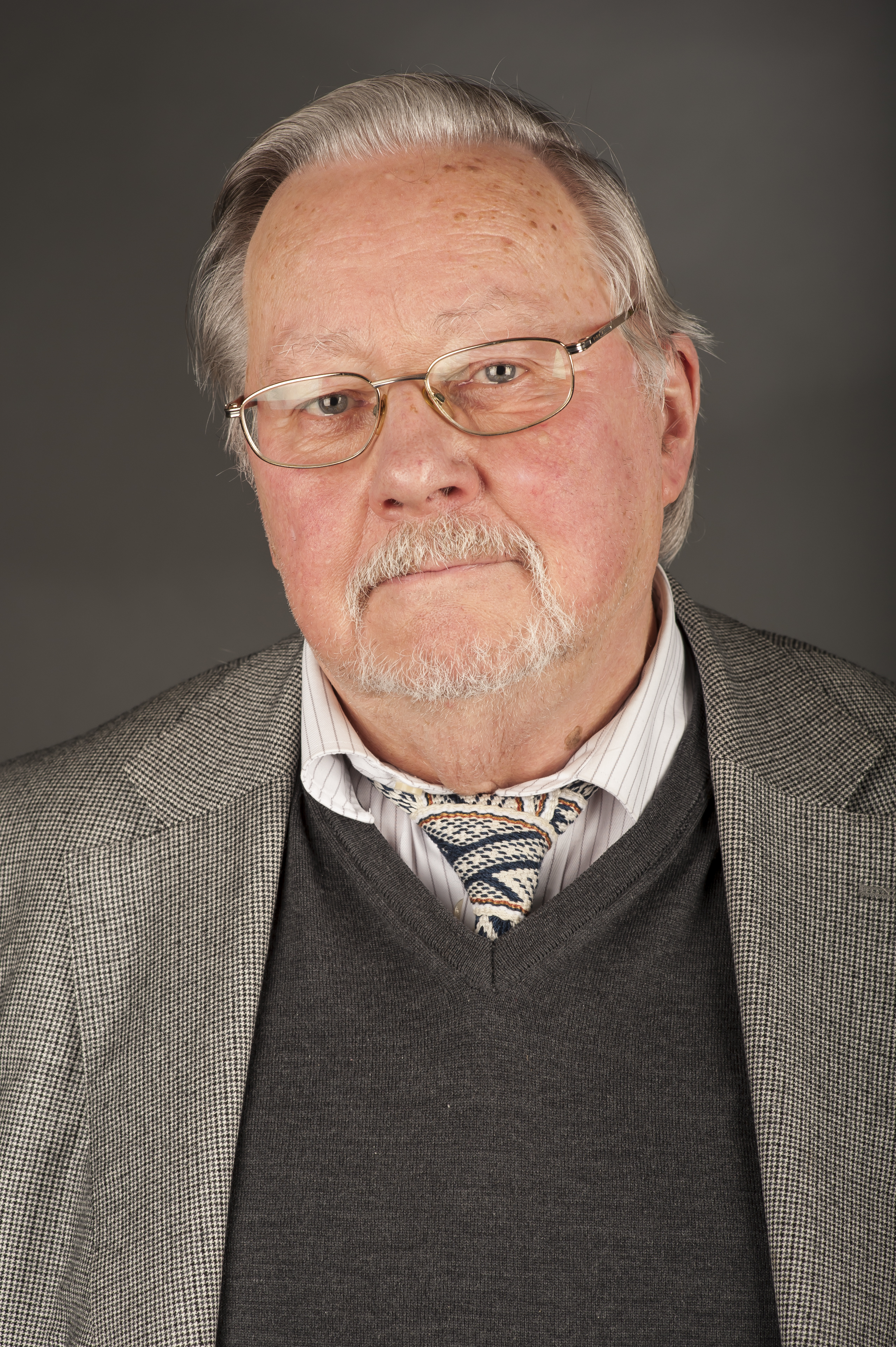
- Official portrait, 2014

Chairman of the Supreme Council – Reconstituent Seimas
- In office 11 March 1990 – 25 November 1992
- Preceded by: Post created Antanas Smetona (in 1940, last legal President) Konstantinas Šakenis (in 1940, last legal Speaker of the Seimas)
- Succeeded by: Algirdas Brazauskas (as the Speaker of the Seimas and acting President of Lithuania)

Speaker of the Seimas
- In office 25 November 1996 – 19 October 2000
- Preceded by: Česlovas Juršėnas
- Succeeded by: Artūras Paulauskas

Chairman of the Homeland Union
- In office 1 May 1993 – 24 May 2003
- Preceded by: Post created
- Succeeded by: Andrius Kubilius

Member of the European Parliament for Lithuania
- In office 28 April 2003 – 30 June 2014

Personal details
- Born: 18 October 1932 (age 94) Kaunas, Lithuania
- Party: Sąjūdis (1988–1993); Homeland Union (1993–present)
- Spouse: Gražina Ručytė-Landsbergienė
- Education: Lithuanian Academy of Music and Theatre (1955)
- Awards: Star of Lithuanian Diplomacy (2017)
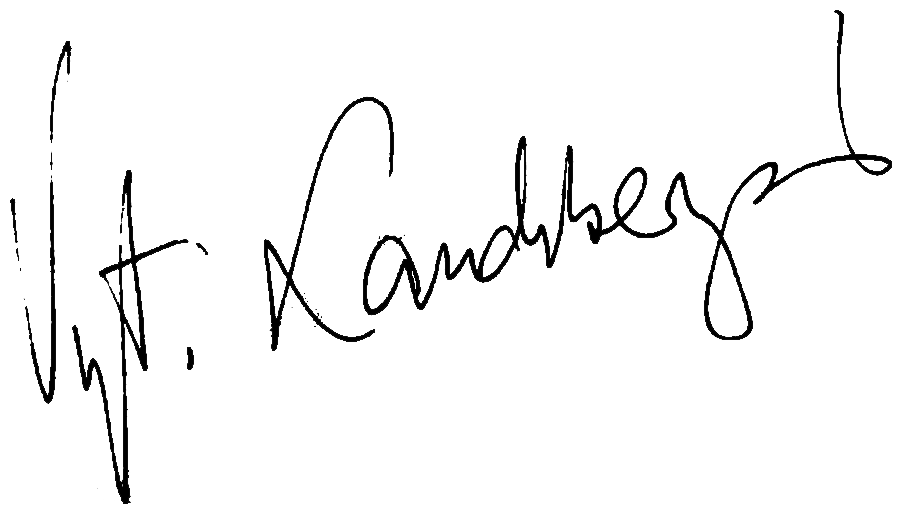
- Signature

Vytautas Landsbergis (Note: Lithuanian pronunciation: [ˈvʲîːtɒʊtɐs ˈɫɑ̂ˑnʲdzʲbʲɛrʲɡʲɪs]) (born 18 October 1932) is a Lithuanian politician, musicologist and former Member of the European Parliament. He was the first Speaker of Reconstituent Seimas of Lithuania after its independence declaration from the Soviet Union. He has written 20 books on a variety of topics, including a biography of Mikalojus Konstantinas Čiurlionis, as well as works on politics and music. He is a founding signatory of the Prague Declaration, and a member of the international advisory council of the Victims of Communism Memorial Foundation.

== Biography ==
Vytautas Landsbergis, a member of an old German Landsberg family, was born in Kaunas, Lithuania. His father was the architect Vytautas Landsbergis-Žemkalnis. His mother, ophthalmologist Dr. Ona Jablonskytė-Landsbergienė, assisted her sister's family in sheltering a Jewish child, Avivit Kissin, from the Holocaust. She brought Kissin to her sister's home and produced a forged birth certificate with a Lithuanian for Kissin. Her sister and brother-in-law were named Righteous Among the Nations. Jablonskytė-Landsbergienė was also named as Righteous Among the Nations for her efforts to help hide a 16-year-old Jewish girl named Bella Gurvich (later Rozenberg).

In 1952, he placed third in the Lithuanian chess championship, after Ratmir Kholmov and Vladas Mikėnas. In 1955, he graduated from the Lithuanian Conservatory of Music (now Lithuanian Academy of Music and Theatre). In 1969, he wrote his thesis for his PhD degree. In 1978, he became a professor at the Lithuanian Conservatory. From 1978 to 1990, he was a professor at both the Lithuanian Conservatory and the Vilnius Pedagogical University. In 1994, he wrote a thesis for his doctor habilitus degree.

== Family ==
Landsbergis was married to Gražina Ručytė-Landsbergienė (1930–2020), who was a well-known Lithuanian pianist and associate Professor of the Lithuanian Academy of Music and Theater. His daughters Jūratė and Birutė are also musicians. His son, Vytautas, is a well-known Lithuanian writer and film director. His grandson Gabrielius Landsbergis (b. 1982) is the former (2015–2024) leader of the conservative party, a former member of Lithuanian Parliament, and the former Foreign Minister of Lithuania.

== Political career ==
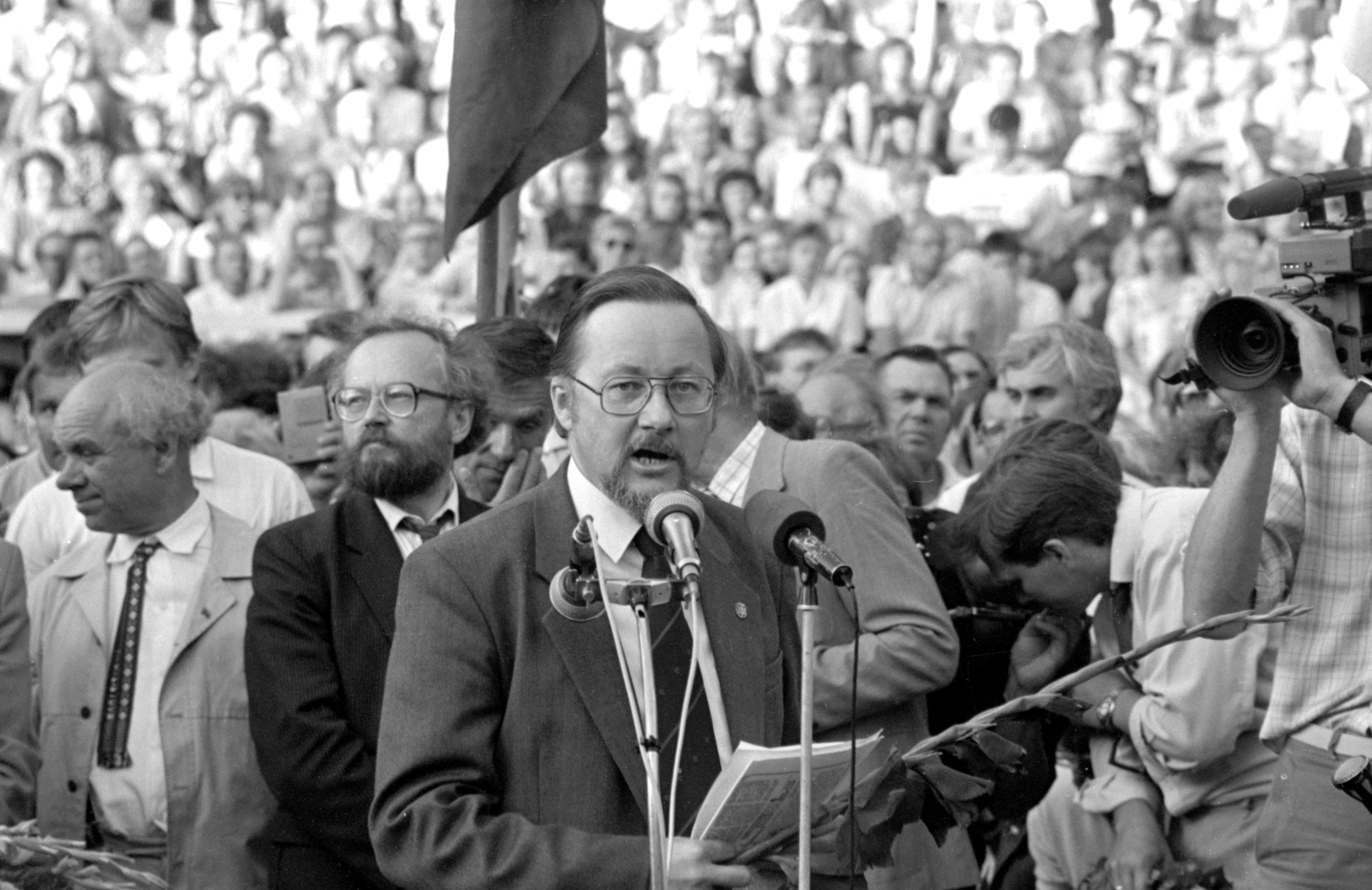
Vytautas Landsbergis speaks at Molotov–Ribbentrop Pact 50th Anniversary Rally in Kalnai Park, Vilnius, Lithuania, 1989.

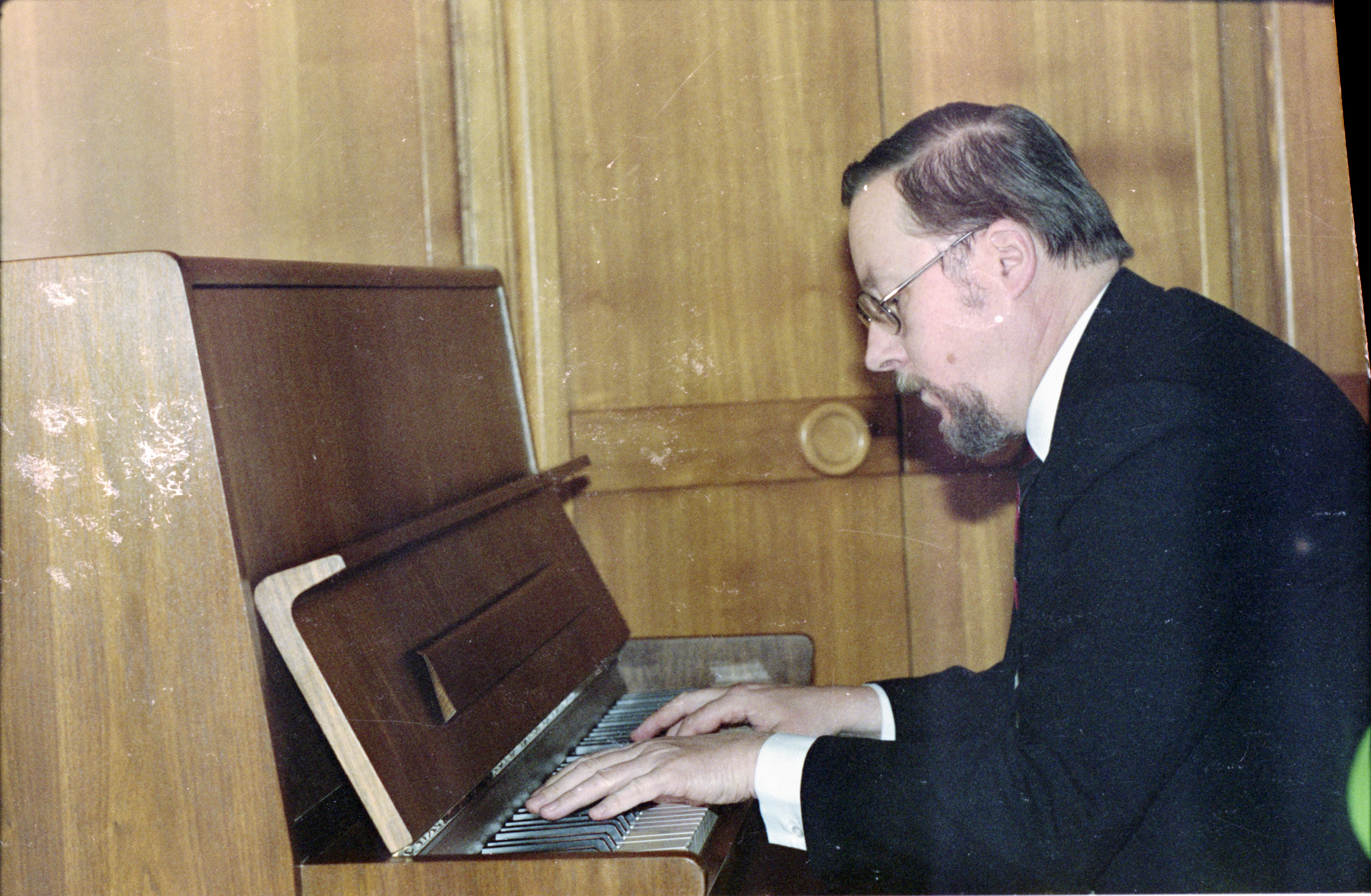
Landsbergis playing a piano in his cabinet soon after his election as the Chairman of the Supreme Council of Lithuania – Reconstituent Seimas in 1990

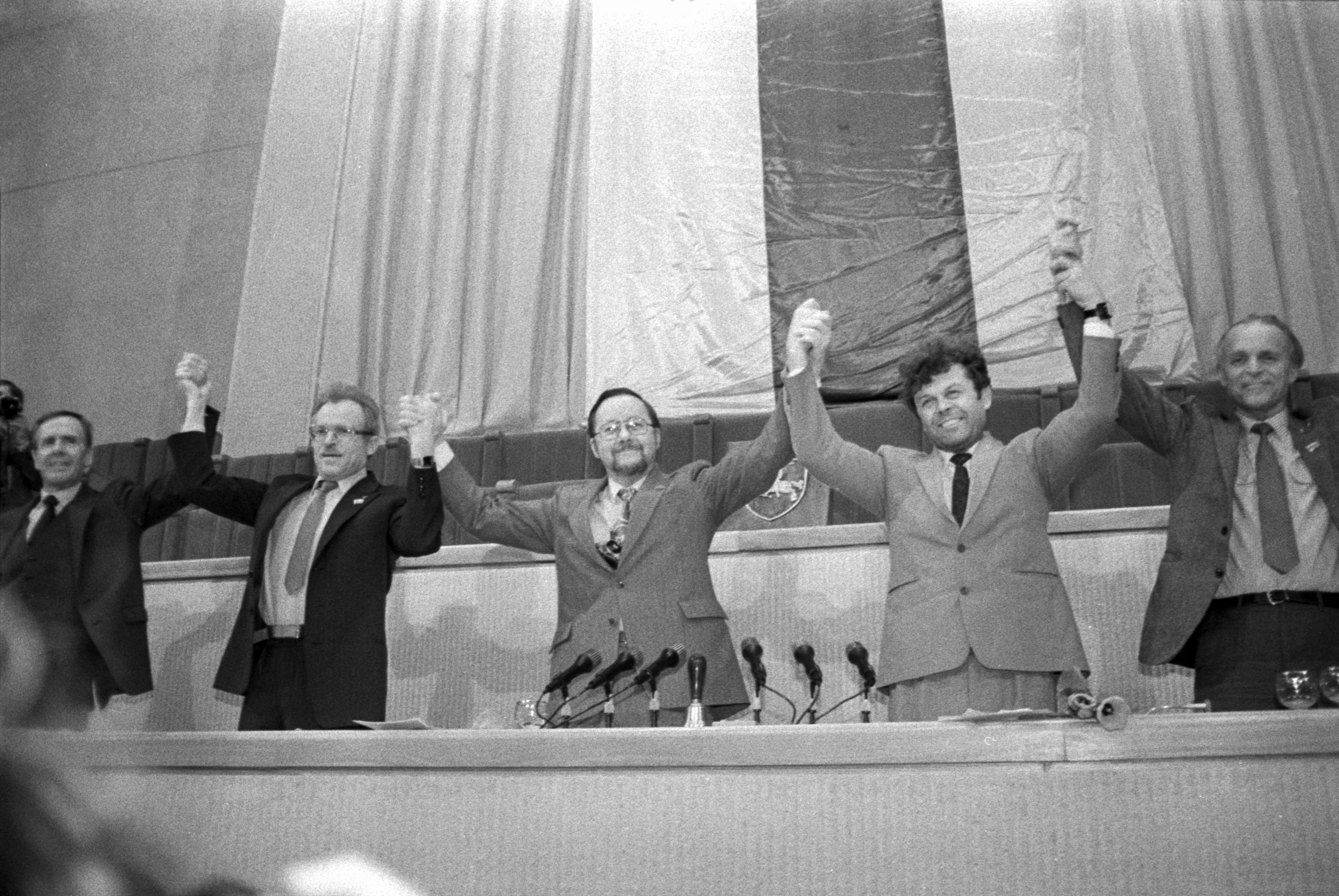
Vytautas Landsbergis (in the middle) on 11 March 1990, after the promulgation of the Act of the Re-Establishment of the State of Lithuania

Landsbergis entered politics, in 1988, as one of the founders of Sąjūdis, the Lithuanian pro-independence political movement. In the 1989 elections to the Congress of People's Deputies of the Soviet Union, Landsbergis was elected as one of the People's Deputies from Lithuanian SSR. After Sąjūdis' victory in the 1990 elections, he became the Chairman of the Supreme Council of Lithuania.

On 11 March 1990, he headed the Parliamentary session during which the restoration of Lithuanian independence from the Soviet Union was declared. Lithuania became the first Soviet Republic to do so. According to the Temporary Primary Law (de facto temporary Constitution, until the permanent Constitution comes to power) of Lithuania, Landsbergis was both: the highest officer of State and the Speaker of the Parliament. He held this post from March 1990 until the next elections in November 1992.

The Soviet Union attempted to stifle this activity by economic blockade in 1990, but it failed, and other Soviet Republics soon followed suit and declared their independence from Moscow as well. He was also extremely dubious of the view that Mikhail Gorbachev was trying to liberalize the Soviet Union and that Lithuania should not prevent him from doing so. Landsbergis also played a crucial role during the confrontation between the Lithuanian independence movement and Soviet armed forces in January 1991. Iceland was the first state that officially recognized the restoration of Lithuanian independence; Landsbergis was somewhat critical of certain Western powers (such as the United States and United Kingdom) for not showing enough support in Lithuania's bid to restore its independence after more than 40 years of Soviet occupation, although he did accept the recommendation from his government that the newly independent Lithuania immediately seek to establish full diplomatic relations with the UK and US.

In 1993, Landsbergis led much of Sąjūdis into a new political party, the Homeland Union (Tėvynės Sąjunga). It gained a landslide victory in the 1996 parliamentary elections. Landsbergis served as Speaker of the Seimas from 1996 until 2000. He ran, although unsuccessfully, for president in 1997 (coming up third after receiving 15.9% of the votes). During the runoff, he supported Valdas Adamkus, who had finished second in the first round. Adamkus eventually became president.

In 2004, Landsbergis was elected by Lithuanian voters to the European Parliament in Brussels (the total number of MEPs from Lithuania in Brussels was 13), and has been returned at every election until 2014.

In 2005, Landsbergis became an international patron of the newly formed Henry Jackson Society.

Since 2015, Landsbergis, together with Roswitha Fessler-Ketteler, MEP Heidi Hautala, Aleksi Malmberg, and Frank Schwalba-Hoth, is a member of the advisory board of the Caucasian Chamber Orchestra association and its German "Förderverein".

== Attempt to ban Communist and Nazi insignia ==
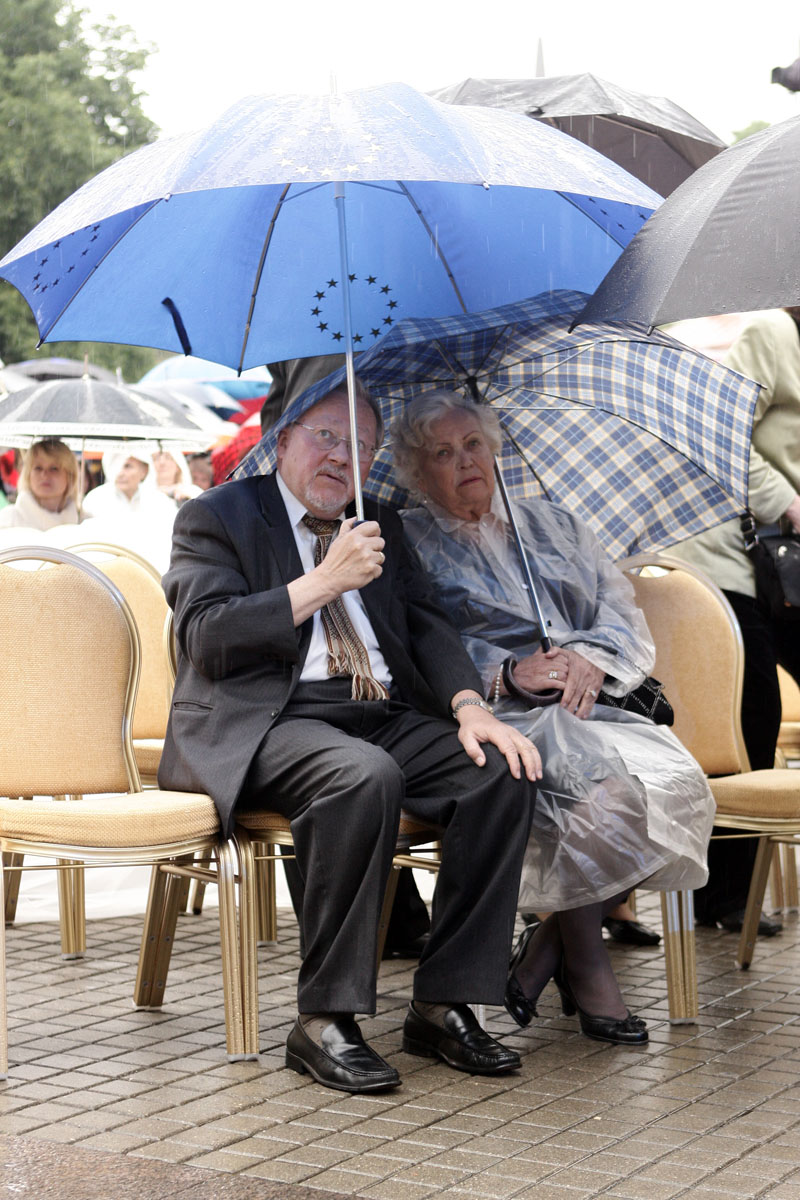
Landsbergis with his wife during the inauguration of President Dalia Grybauskaitė, 2009

In January 2005, Landsbergis, backed by Member of the European Parliament from Hungary Jozsef Szajer, urged that Communist symbols be banned in the European Union, in addition to Nazi symbols. He also sent a letter to Franco Frattini, the European Commissioner of Justice and Internal Affairs, suggesting that in case the EU decides to ban Nazi symbols, Communist symbols should be banned too. The Commissioner became interested in this proposal and said: I am ready to join this discussion. The Communist dictatorships no less than the Nazi ones are responsible for the deaths of tens of millions of people. A bit later, however, the Commissioner decided that he would not attempt to ban any symbols, as there was no agreement as to which symbols should be banned.

Landsbergis' proposal caused quite a stir in Italy, where leftists strongly protested such a move. The Communist Refoundation Party and Party of Italian Communists were outraged at the proposal. It became the center of Italian media's attention. One of the most influential Italian dailies, La Repubblica, published an interview with Landsbergis outlining his proposal. It was the first time the daily allocated a full page to a politician from Lithuania.

Landsbergis's proposal found few supporters among Italian politicians. One was Alessandra Mussolini, a granddaughter of former Italian fascist dictator Benito Mussolini, who commented: "To implement the proposal of the Members of the European Parliament regarding Communist symbols is our moral duty".

Landsbergis' proposal was opposed by the Russian Parliament as well. The First Vicespeaker of the Russian State Duma called the proposal "abnormal". Another Russian MP, a communist, commented that "somebody in Europe became insolent and forgot who saved them from the fascists".

The debate came to an end when, in the beginning of February 2005, the European Commission rejected calls for a proposed Europe-wide ban on Nazi symbols to be extended to cover Communist Party symbols as well. Frattini said it would not be appropriate to include the red star and the hammer and sickle in a draft EU law on racism.

Finally, at the end of February 2005, the European Union dropped proposals to ban Nazi symbols across its 25 member states. Luxembourg withdrew the plan when it became clear that members could not reach a consensus on which symbols to ban. There were also concerns that the proposed ban was a threat to freedom of expression.

Landsbergis is a fierce critic of Russia's intentions to impose any kind of influence on the Baltic states and has publicly questioned Russia's actions vis-à-vis the Baltic States on both local and international media, as well as in the European Parliament. He warns that Russia might have intentions to control Lithuania and the other Baltic States economically and politically through a wide network of former KGB agents and other clandestine activities. Landsbergis is one of the most active politicians who urge Russia to compensate Lithuania and other post-Soviet republics for damage done to them during their occupations.

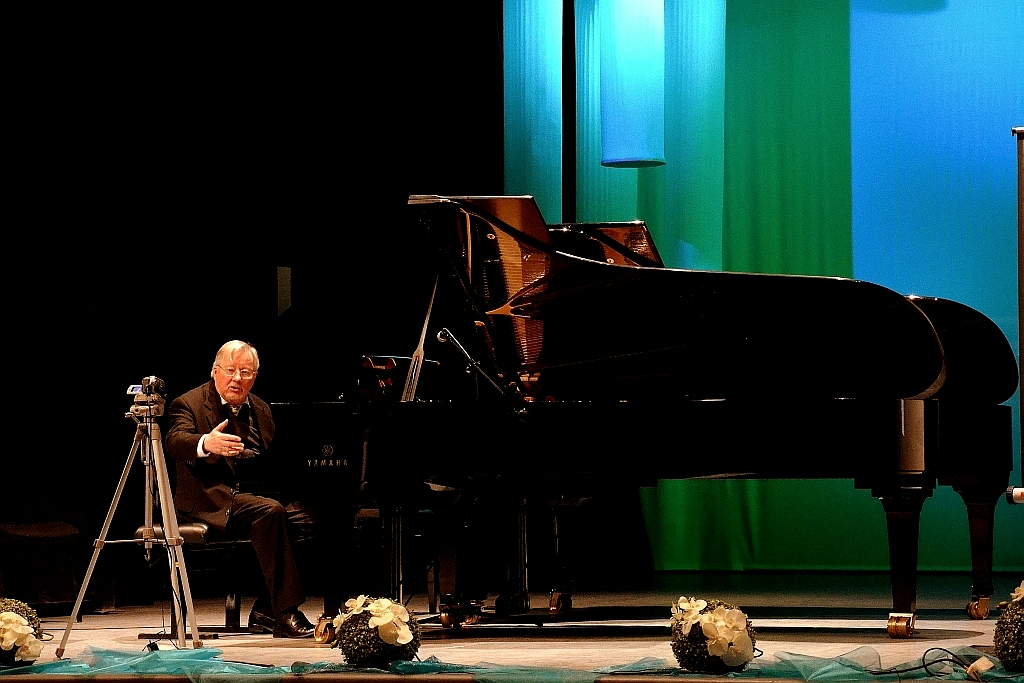
Vytautas Landsbergis plays piano in Sanok (Poland) at Cultural Center salon, 2013

== Controversies ==
=== Comments on Vilnius street and memorial renaming controversy ===
In 2019, Vilnius's mayor, Remigijus Šimašius, renamed a street that had been named after Kazys Skirpa (who formed the Lithuanian Activist Front, which massacred Jews across Lithuania) and removed a memorial to Jonas Noreika (who ordered and oversaw the killings of Lithuanian Jews in Plungė during the Plungė massacre). Landsbergis posted a poem on social media that referred to the Virgin Mary as a "žydelka" ("jew-girl"), and Faina Kukliansky, chair of the Jewish Community of Lithuania, condemned it. Landsbergis said the poem was an attempt to show the ignorance of Lithuanian antisemites and requested support from "at least one smart and brave Jew ... who does not agree with Simasius."

=== Recognition as the head of state of Lithuania ===
The question of whether Vytautas Landsbergis should be officially acknowledged as the head of state of Lithuania from 1990 to 1992 has been polarising the Lithuanian public for many years. On 25 June 2022, the Lithuanian Seimas officially approved the bill regarding Landsbergis' recognition as the head of state. "The bill is a symbol of respect and acknowledgement of a person who played a significant role in Lithuania’s history," the Speaker of Seimas, V. Čmilytė-Nielsen, said. The opposition claimed that such a step was a "falsification of history" as the Provisional Constitution along with other historical records state that "[t]he functions of the head of state during the transitional period remain with the collegial Parliament body—the Presidium of the Supreme Council of Lithuania." The latter was a collective political entity consisting of 11 deputies possessing equal powers, which was disbanded on 22 November 1992, when the current Constitution of Lithuania was adopted. The decision made by Seimas proved to be unpopular among the public. According to one survey done by Lietuvos rytas, 68% of respondents disagree with such an initiative, with 42% of them believing that it is baseless and 26% doubting its validity. On 30 June 2022, Vytautas Landsbergis was officially recognized as the first post-soviet Lithuania's head of state. "Should I be congratulated? I don't know... Lithuania is the one that should be congratulated more as it is finally on a par with Estonia. Estonia has already sorted it out in a way that Arnold Rüütel was President since March of 1990," Landsbergis commented. The opposition threatened to renounce Landsbergis' status as the head of state in the next parliamentary elections.

== Health ==
In September 2025, Landsbergis was hospitalized in Vilnius, Lithuania for "heart problems".

== Bibliography ==
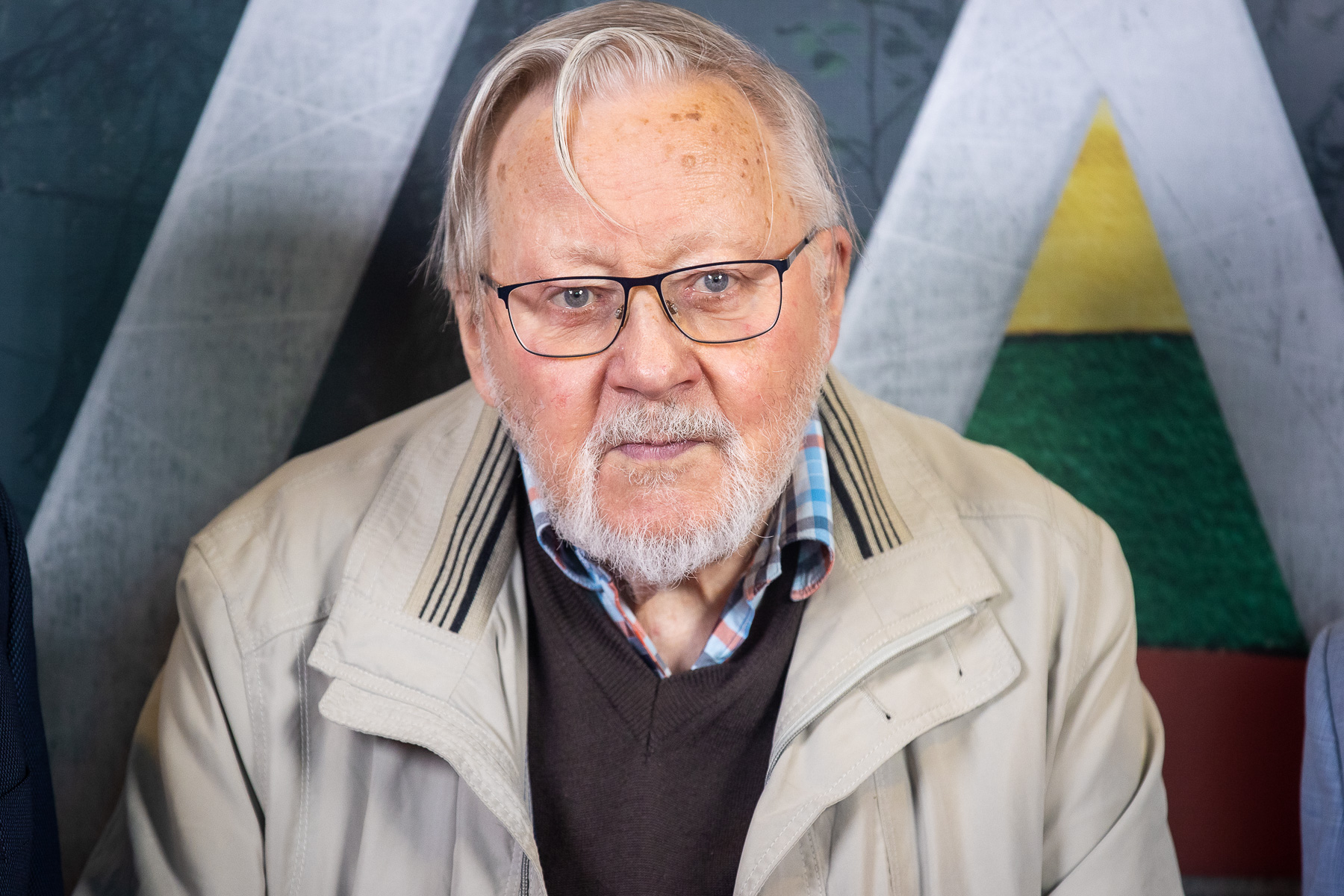
Landsbergis in 2023

- Visas Čiurlionis, 2008.
- Karaliaučius ir Lietuva: nuostatos ir idėjos, 2003.
- Pusbrolis Motiejus: knyga apie Stasį Lozoraitį iš jo laiškų ir pasisakymų, 2002.
- Sunki laisvė: 1991 m. ruduo – 1992 m. ruduo, 2000.
- Landsbergis aria, 1997.
- Lūžis prie Baltijos: politinė autobiografija, 1997.
- Čiurlionio muzika, 1996.
- Tėvynės valanda, 1993.
- Atgavę viltį: pertvarkos tekstų knygelė, 1990.
- Sonatos ir fugos / M.K. Čiurlionis [editor], 1980.
- Čiurlionio dailė, 1976.

== Honours and awards ==
=== Honours ===
==== National honours ====
- Lithuania: Grand Cross with Collar of the Order of Vytautas the Great
- Lithuania: Grand Cross of the Order of the Cross of Vytis
- Lithuania: Grand Cross of the Order of Grand Duke Gediminas

==== Foreign honours ====
- Estonia: Grand Cross with Collar of the Order of the Cross of Terra Mariana
- France: Grand Cross of the National Order of the Legion of Honour
- France: Grand Cross of the Order of La Pléiade
- Saxony: Recipient of the Saxon Constitutional Medal
- Greece: Grand Cross of the Order of Honour
- Latvia: Grand Officer of the Order of the Three Stars
- Luxembourg: Recipient of the European Medal of Merit
- Malta: Honorary Knight Grand Cross of Obedience of the Sovereign Military Order of Malta
- Norway: Knight Grand Cross of the Royal Norwegian Order of Merit
- Poland: Grand Cross of the Order of Merit of the Republic of Poland
- (Romania) Romanian Royal Family: Extra Knight Grand Cross of the Order of the Crown

=== Awards ===
Foreign Awards

- European People's Party: Recipient of the Robert Schuman Medal
- France: Foundation du Futur Award
- Germany Hermann Ehlers Prize
- Italy: Vibo Valentia Testimony Prize
- Norway: Norwegian People's Peace Prize
- Philippines: Gusi Peace Prize
- Spain: Ramon Llull International Prize
- UNESCO: Recipient of the Medal for Contribution in Democracy and the Fight for Human Rights
- United States: Recipient of the Presidents Truman-Reagan Medal of Freedom of the Victims of Communism Memorial Foundation
- United Kingdom: International Freedom Foundation Award

== Honorary doctorates ==
Landsbergis has received honorary doctorates from the following institutions:

- United States: Loyola University, Chicago (1991)
- Lithuania: Vytautas Magnus University, Kaunas (1992)
- United States: Weber State University, Ogden, Utah 1992)
- United States: Yale University, New Haven, Connecticut (1992)
- Lithuania: Vilnius Gediminas Technical University (1998)
- Lithuania: University of Law (2000)
- Finland: Helsinki University (2000)
- Wales: Cardiff University (2000)
- France: Sorbonne (2001)
- Lithuania: Art Academy (2003)

== See also ==
- List of presidents of Lithuania
