= Šatrija (disambiguation) =

Šatrija is a hill and a hillfort in the Samogitia region of Lithuania.

Šatrija may also refer to:

- AB Šatrija, sewing factory in Lithuania
- Šatrija River in Lithuania
- Šatrija (club), state educational and recreational establishment for children and youth in Vilnius, Lithuania

== See also ==
- Šatrijos Ragana, pen name of Marija Pečkauskaitė (1877–1930), Lithuanian writer
