= Church of All Saints, Luokė =

Catholic church in Telšiai County, Lithuania

Church of All Saints
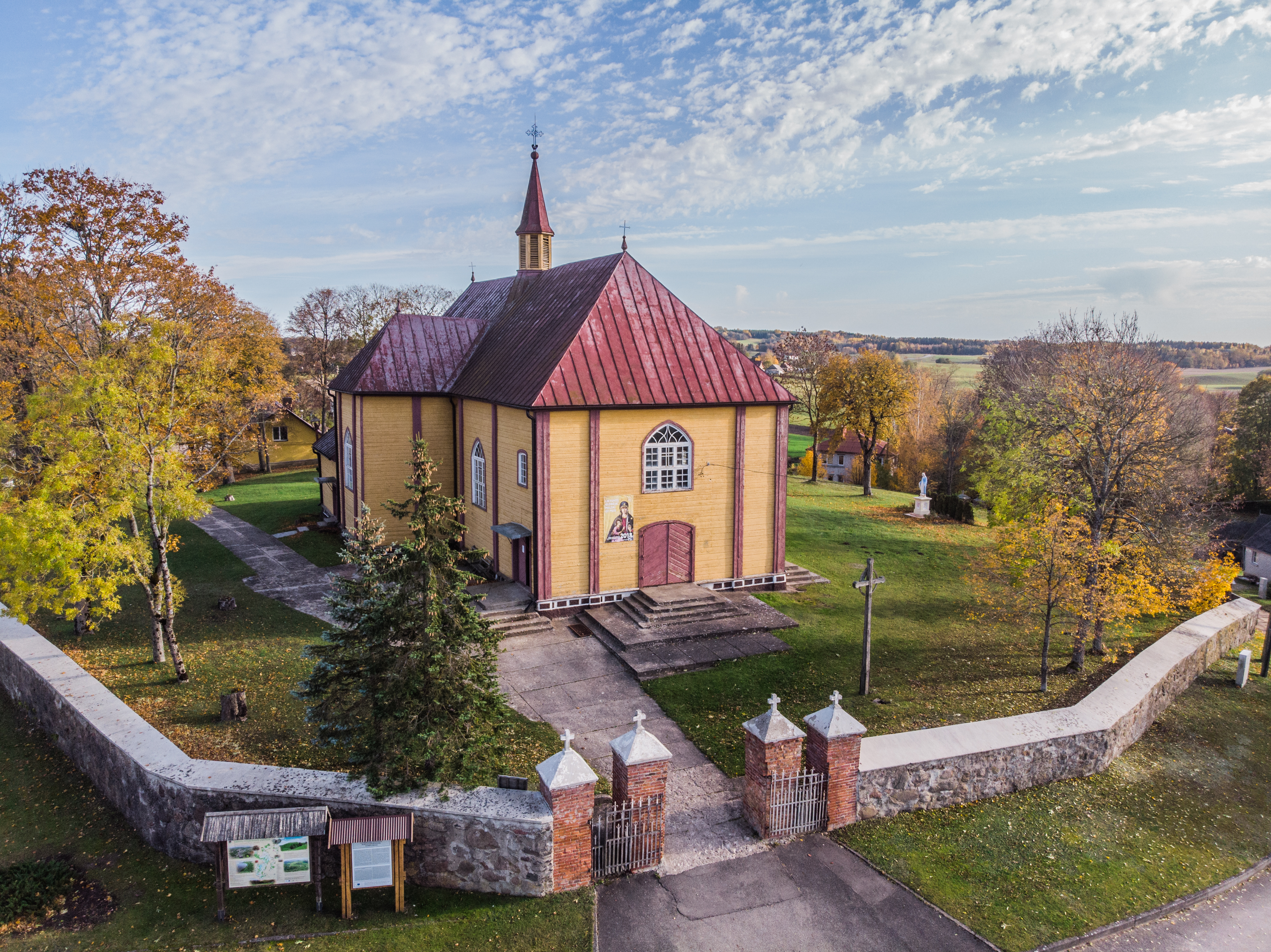
- Aerial view of the church

Religion
- Affiliation: Roman Catholic
- Year consecrated: 1774
- Status: Active

Location
- Location: Luokė, Lithuania
- Interactive map of Church of All Saints
- Coordinates: 55.891324°N 22.526818°E

Architecture
- Funded by: Grand Duke Vytautas
- Completed: 1778
- Materials: Wood

The Church of All Saints (Lithuanian: Luokės Visų Šventųjų bažnyčia) in Luokė is one of the oldest Catholic churches in Lithuania. The first church was likely built soon after the christianization of Samogitia in 1413. The present-day wooden church dates back to 1774.

== History ==
The town of Luokė was first mentioned in historical sources when King Jogaila and Grand Duke Vytautas christianized Samogitia in 1413 and promised to build eight churches, including one in Luokė. The exact date of construction or the location of the first church is not known. It is assumed that the church was built soon after the christianization, though the first mention of a priest in Luokė dates only to 1466. According to Motiejus Valančius, the first Bishop of Samogitia Matthias of Trakai lived in Luokė. Priest Vincentas Juzumas recorded a romantic story that Vytautas built the first church on Šatrija, a hill located near Luokė that was considered sacred in the local pagan faith. Locals rebelled and destroyed the church. Vytautas then ordered the church rebuilt but in the town and not on the hill.

The church received benefices from the Grand Duke and Stanislovas Kęsgaila, Elder of Samogitia. Kęsgaila's benefice, confirmed by Alexander Jagiellon in 1493, in addition to granting land, allowed the parish to maintain five inns that were exempt from taxes. In 1541, parson Jonas Andriejus Valantinas, who was a royal physician and was confirmed as parson of Luokė by Pope Paul III when requested by Sigismund I the Old, asked to remove the limits on the number of inns that the parish could keep. The benefice was further enlarged by Sigismund II Augustus in 1551. Luokė parish was one of the wealthiest parishes in the Diocese of Samogitia. According to Motiejus Valančius, Bishop Merkelis Giedraitis established three deaneries (in Virbalis, Viduklė, and Luokė) in 1587, but documents mentioning deaneries in the diocese date only from 1619–1620.

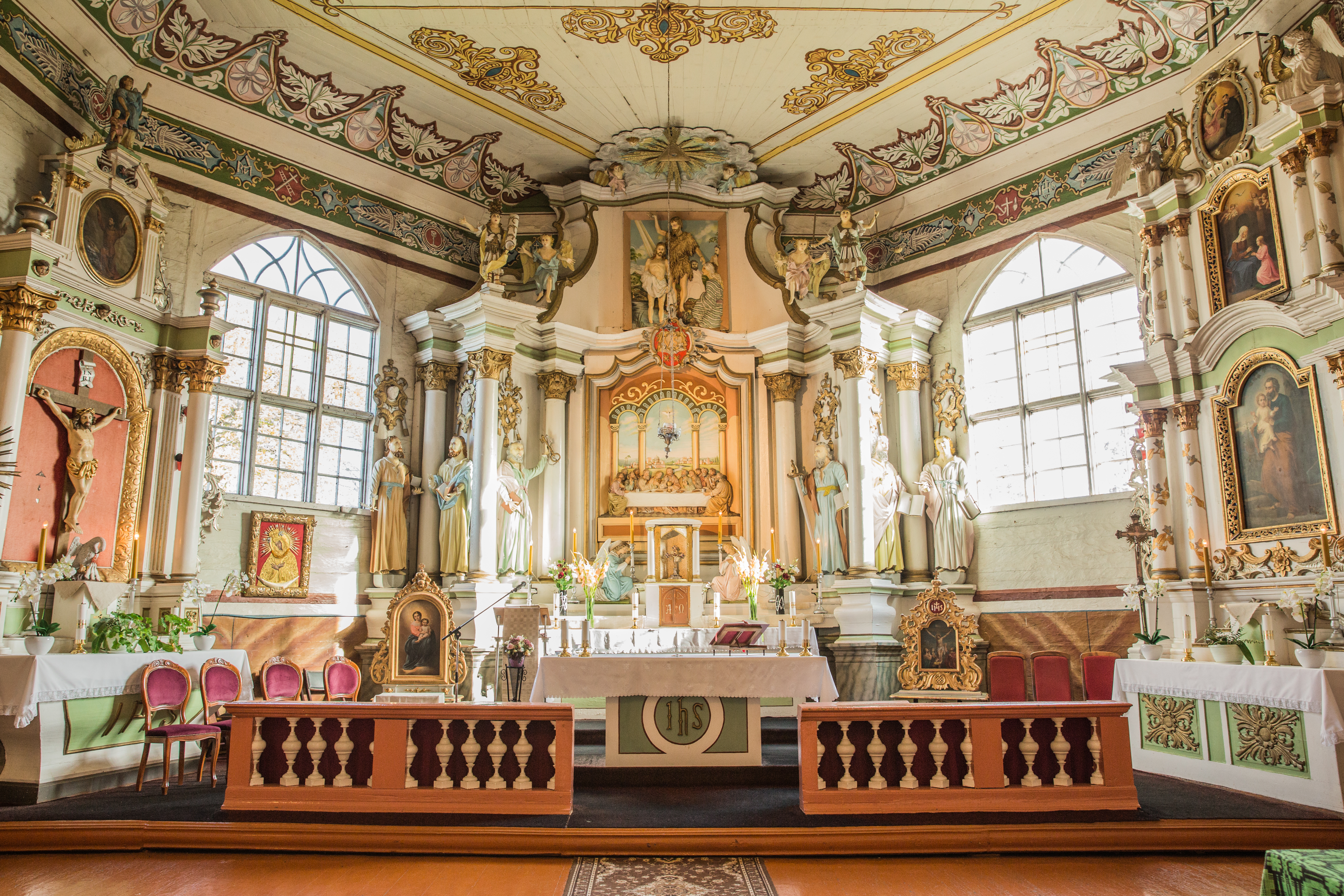
Interior of the church

Luokė had a primitive hospital/shelter for the sick (first mentioned in 1582) and a parish school. In 1841, Luokė parish had 7,668 Catholics and four priests. It owned seven voloks and 27 morgens of land and 15 serfs. During the Uprising of 1863, priest Justinas Siesickis read an uprising manifesto. After the uprising was suppressed by the Tsarist authorities, four priests from Luokė were exiled to Siberia and the parish school was closed. In 1938, the parish had 5,150 Catholics.

== Architecture ==
During the centuries, the wooden church was repaired and rebuilt many times. The church was rebuilt in 1648 and 1675. The present-day church was consecrated in 1774 and completed in 1778. It features folk architectural forms. In 1888, the church was enlarged by adding a sacristy and its altars were gilded. The church tower was built in 1867 and the belfry was added in 1899. The church and major buildings survive from 1899 without major alterations. The church is built from wood. It has one nave but a Latin cross floor plan. Side chapels are separated from the main nave by wide segmental arches. The interior is decorated in folk Baroque style with wall and ceiling murals and Doric columns. The church has five altars. Its pipe organ was built in 1854 and has 13 stops. Its pedal keyboard is not connected to the pipes and was likely added in the 20th century. The belfry measures 6.4 by 4.26 metres (21.0 ft × 14.0 ft) and reaches 9 metres (30 ft) in height. It has a hip roof, two floors, and three bells named after Saints George, Joseph, and Thecla.

== Gallery ==
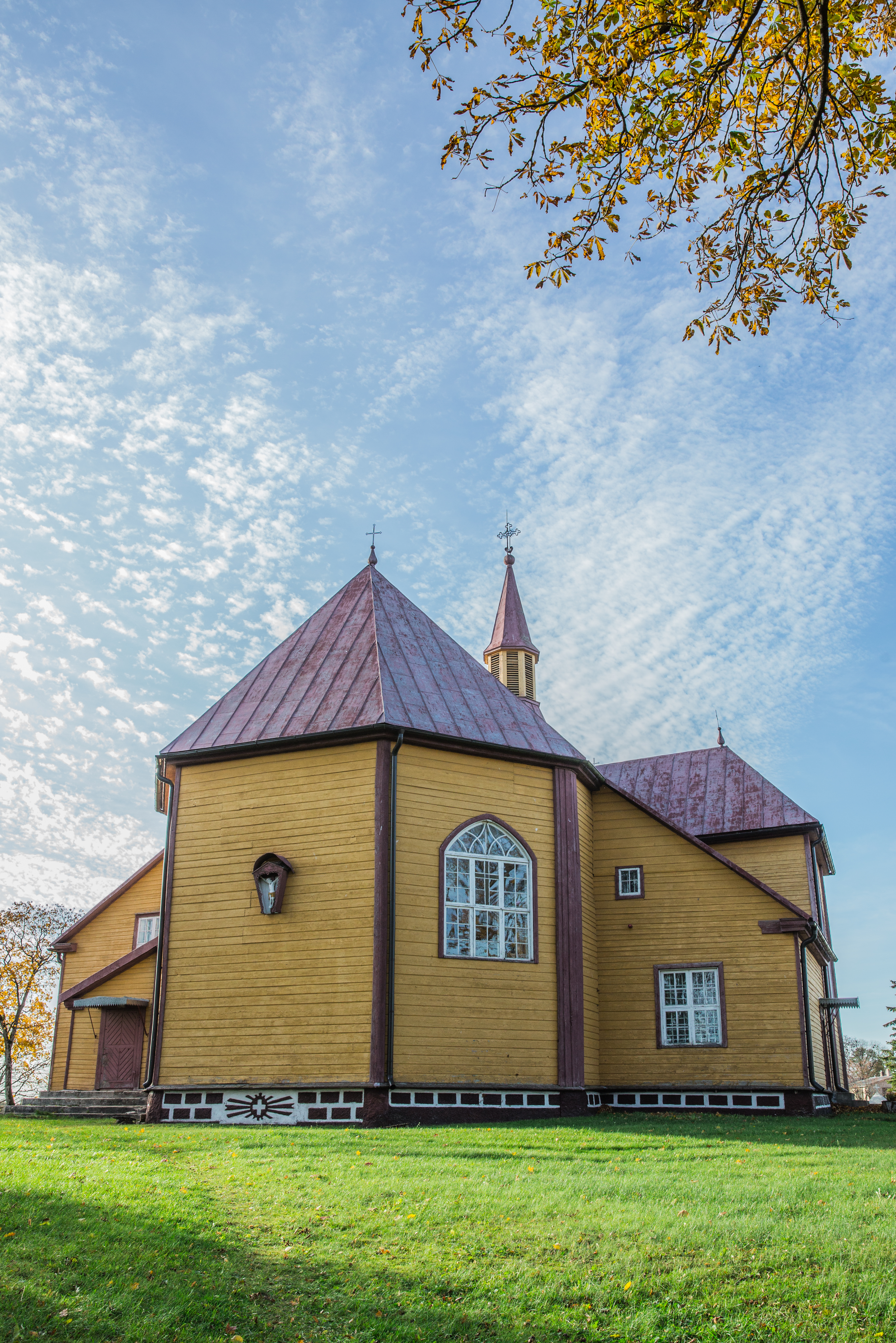

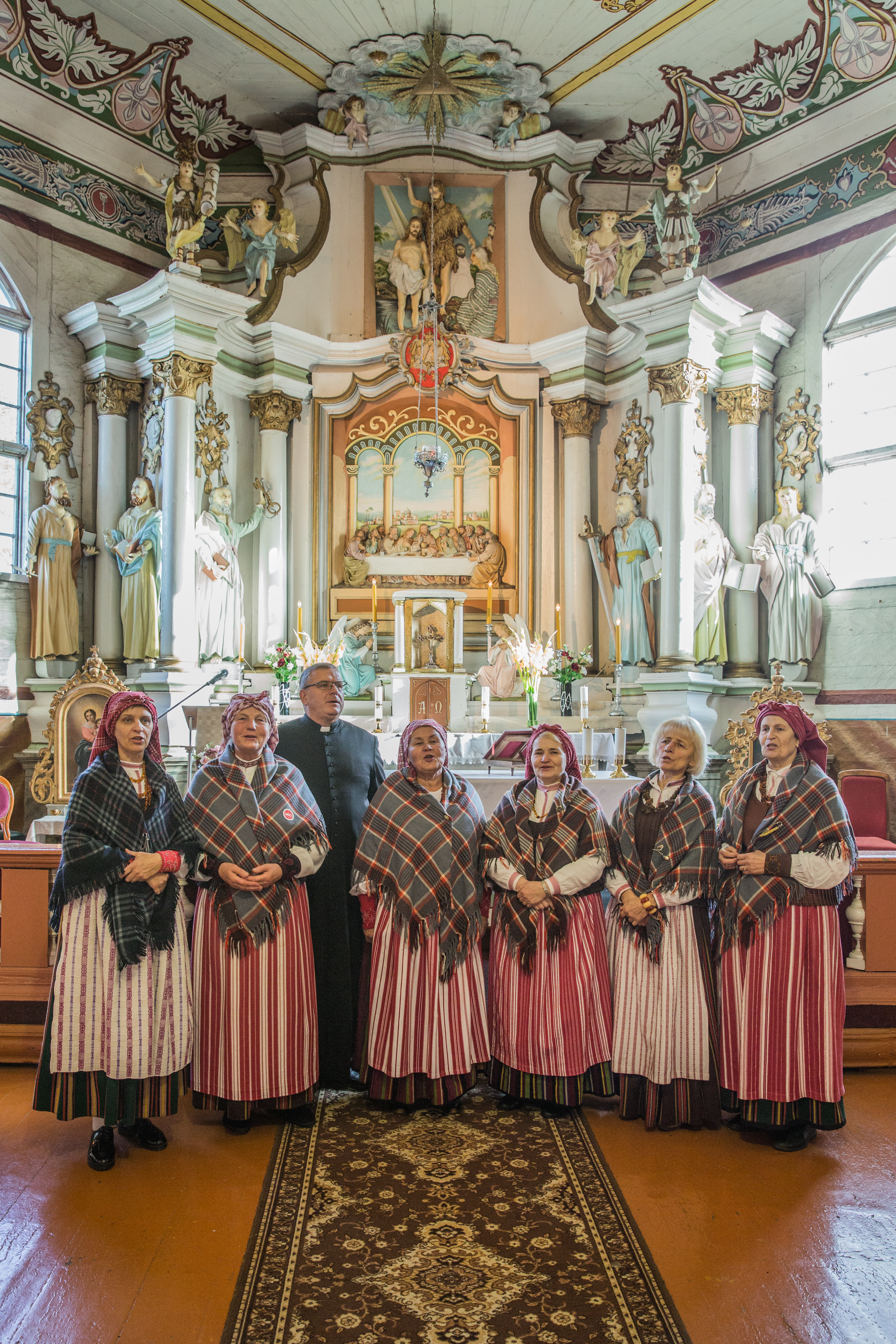

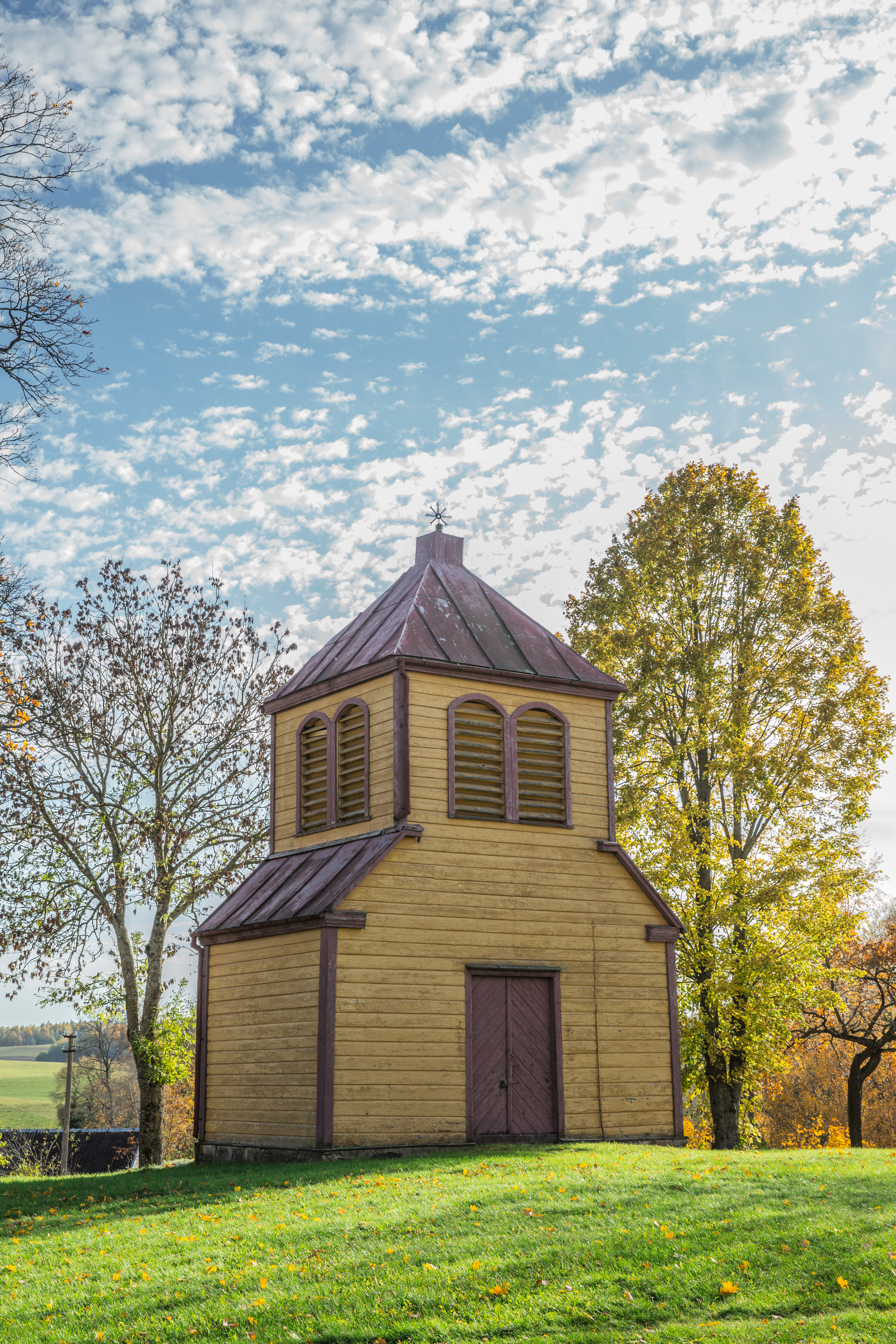

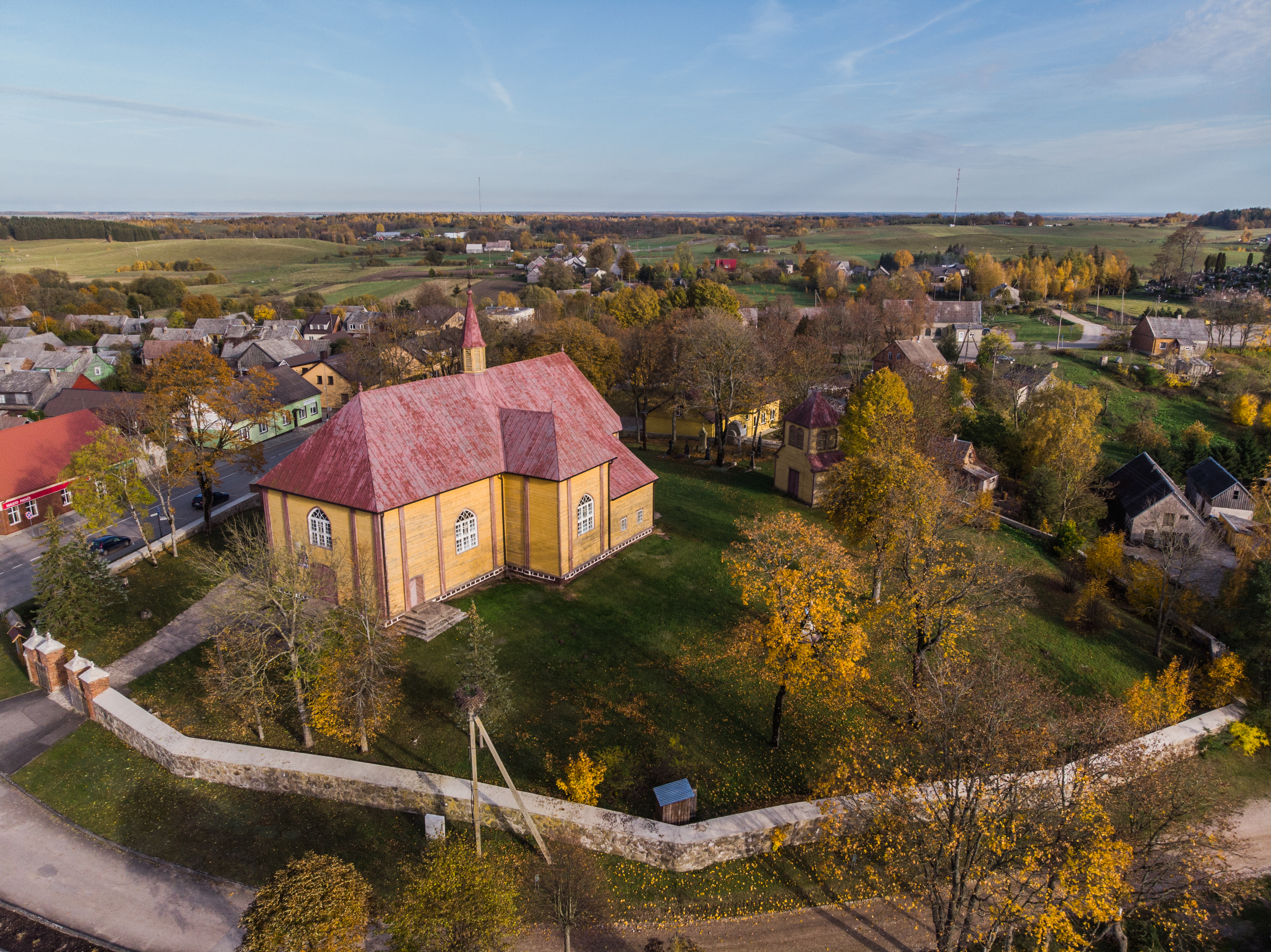
