= Genocide and Resistance Research Centre of Lithuania =

Lithuanian research institute

Coordinates: 54°40′45″N 25°17′14″E

- Lietuvos gyventojų genocido ir rezistencijos tyrimo centras

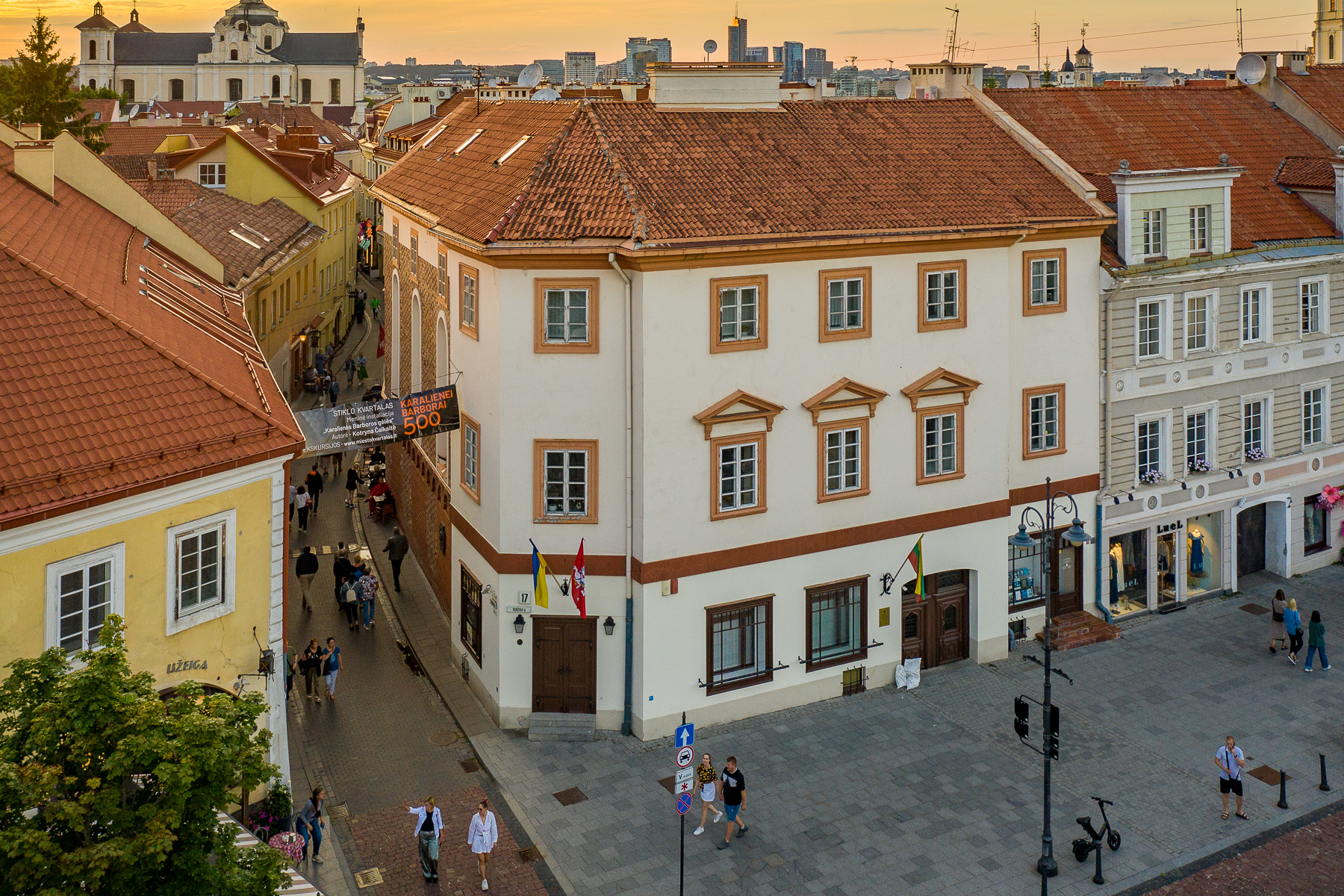
- Headquarters of the institute

State-funded institute overview
- Formed: 29 October 1992; 33 years ago
- Jurisdiction: Lithuania
- Headquarters: Didžioji g. 17-1, Vilnius, Lithuania
- Employees: 142
- State-funded institute executive: Arūnas Bubnys, Director general
- Website: www.genocid.lt

The Genocide and Resistance Research Centre of Lithuania (Lithuanian: Lietuvos gyventojų genocido ir rezistencijos tyrimo centras or LGGRTC) is a state-funded research institute in Lithuania dedicated to "the study of genocide, crimes against humanity, and war crimes in Lithuania; the study of the persecution of local residents by occupying regimes; the study of armed and unarmed resistance to occupying regimes; the initiation of the legal evaluation of the activities of the organisers and implementers of genocide; and the commemoration of freedom fighters and genocide victims." The centre was founded on 25 October 1992 by the Supreme Council of the Lithuanian Republic as the "State Genocide Research Centre of Lithuania". It is a member organisation of the Platform of European Memory and Conscience. The centre has been embroiled in several controversies regarding the memory of the Holocaust in Lithuania - it is accused by several scholars and Jewish groups of whitewashing the reputation of Nazi collaborators.

== Purpose ==
The LGGRTC's main areas of activity, in line with its original mission statement, include research and documenting atrocities committed by the occupying Soviet and Nazi regimes and the resistance to these regimes between 1939 and 1990. The Centre recommends former anti-Soviet partisans for larger state pensions and other awards. The LGGRTC classifies the Soviet occupation of Lithuania as a genocide of the Lithuanian nation. The centre uses a broadened definition of genocide including the targeting of social, political, and economic groups by Stalin. This definition has been accepted by the European Court of Human Rights in convictions against Soviet occupation forces.

== Activities ==
In 1998, Lithuania passed a law restricting employment in the public sector for former employees of the KGB, the MGB, and other Soviet security institutions. The centre and the State Security Department had the authority to determine whether a person was an employee of the KGB. In 2002, commemorating the 30th anniversary of Romas Kalanta's self-immolation, Seimas listed May 14 as the Civil Resistance Day (Lithuanian: Pilietinio pasipriešinimo diena) based on recommendations by the centre.

The centre publishes the journal Genocidas ir Rezistencija. One of its long-term research projects is a database and multi-volume publication of names and biographies of the victims of the Soviet and Nazi persecutions. In 2001–2005, the centre handled around 22,000 applications for compensation from the Foundation "Remembrance, Responsibility and Future."

The centre operates the Museum of Occupations and Freedom Fights in the former prison of KGB in Vilnius and a memorial at the Tuskulėnai Manor. Prior to 2018 the museum was known as "the Museum of Genocide Victims," it was renamed following international criticism.

In 1999–2002, the centre was involved in the attempted prosecution regarding a former Colonel of the KGB Nachman Dushanski and twelve other suspected former KGB officers and collaborators. In 2007, the head of the Genocide Center at the time, Arvydas Anušauskas, helped launch an investigation into those believed to have participated in the Kaniūkai massacre, including the former director of Yad Vashem and Soviet partisan Yitzhak Arad. Lithuanian prosecutors in the investigation cited Arad's autobiography, published in the US in 1972, in which he recalled his involvement in the Soviet partisans. The investigation was closed in 2008, citing a failure to "collect adequate evidence." This investigation, among others that targeted Holocaust survivors, were seen by Jewish groups, academics, and journalists as resistance against prosecuting Lithuanian Holocaust collaborators. Israel described the investigations as anti-Semitic - a charge denied by Lithuanian prosecutors.

In 2015, at the urging of the centre, the Lithuanian government stripped Nazi collaborator Pranas Končius-Adomas of state honors. Historian Efraim Zuroff praised the action, but added that “There are other cases that are far more prominent in which the Genocide Center has not chosen to recommend the cancellation of honors."

In 2024, The Lithuanian Genocide and Resistance Research Centre and the Federal Bureau of Investigation (FBI) have agreed to cooperate in identifying the remains of Lithuanian partisans. The agreement allows the Centre's experts to use DNA analysis systems developed by the FBI. The Centre has indicated that the number of unidentified post-war victims may still reach 20,000.

== Organisation ==
The centre's director is nominated by the Prime Minister of Lithuania and confirmed by the Seimas (Lithuanian parliament). Most recently, in 2009, the Seimas confirmed Birutė Burauskaitė, a longtime dissident, as the Center's director.

In 2024 the law on restructuring the Genocide and Resistance Research Centre was passed by the Seimas in July and was signed by the President Gitanas Nausėda. The law significantly raised the level of requirements and qualifications mandatory for the Centre's experts and staff. One of the main changes introduced was the establishment of an additional governing body within the LGGRTC - the Council, which will lead the Centre collectively with the Director.

The Council consists of 11 members appointed for a term of five years:

- Four members nominated by the Conference of Rectors of Lithuanian Universities, all of whom hold university degrees in history, economics, law and management.
- Two members nominated by the Seimas Commission for the Rights and Affairs of Participants of Resistance to Occupation Regimes and Victims of Occupation
- One each nominated by the President, the Government, the Lithuanian Union of Political Prisoners and Deportees, the Genocide and Resistance Research Centre, and the Lithuanian Institute of History.

The Council, on the proposal of the Director of the LGGRTC, approves the areas of research, proposes the long-term strategic plan of operations and the annual performance plan, sets annual objectives for the Director, makes recommendations on the management of the Centre, the implementation of the areas of scientific and applied research, and sets the general requirements for the candidates for the Heads of Centre's departments. The law establishes that the Council will call and conduct the election of the Director of the Genocide and Resistance Research Centre.

In November 2024, historian Arūnas Streikus was elected Chairman of the first Council.

== Criticism ==
During the legal proceedings against Yitzhak Arad, he was heading The International Commission for the Evaluation of the Crimes of the Nazi and Soviet Occupation Regimes in Lithuania. The investigation, which derailed the work of the international commission whose members resigned in protest, was viewed internationally as a "contemptible farce", an attempt to erase Lithuanian's history of collaboration with the Nazis, and victim blaming, particularly due to the lack of prosecution of the many Lithuanian Nazi collaborators.

The centre received criticism as the Nazi genocide of the Jews and Lithuanian collaboration in it are minimized, while the genocide of Lithuanians by Soviet partisans is described extensively. One plaque standing by a relocated memorial to Soviet partisans falsely asserts that Soviet partisans were "mostly of Jewish nationality [since] native people didn't support Soviet partisans." One anti-Soviet partisan honored by the center is Jonas Noreika, who was responsible for the Plungė massacre of Jews. Noreika's granddaughter has advocated for the plaque honoring him to be removed, calling him a "Nazi collaborator who helped murder thousands of Jews and steal their property."

In 2020, the centre was criticised by the Jewish Community of Lithuania organization for appointing Vidmantas Valušaitis to a leadership position. The group accused Valušaitis of Holocaust distortion for defending Juozas Lukša in an essay. In the essay, he falsely called Lukŝa's alleged victims "members of the Communist party" and described his alleged actions as an act of revenge. Lukša was accused by eyewitnesses of participating in the Kaunas pogrom - specifically assisting in the massacre of Jews in Lietukis Garage and beheading a local rabbi, Zalmen Osovsky.

== See also ==
- International Commission for the Evaluation of the Crimes of the Nazi and Soviet Occupation Regimes in Lithuania
- Resistance in Lithuania during World War II
- German occupation of Lithuania during World War II
- Occupation of the Baltic states
- Double genocide theory
