= Lithuanian Jewish Community =

Organization uniting Lithuanian Jews

The Lithuanian Jewish Community (Lithuanian: Lietuvos žydų bendruomenė, abbreviated LŽB) is an organization in Lithuania uniting Lithuanian Jews. Its registered office is in Vilnius; as an umbrella organization, it unites 27 different Jewish organizations. The Jewish Community of Lithuania is the Lithuanian affiliate of the World Jewish Congress.

== History ==
On August 25, 1988, it was officially decided to establish the 'Lithuanian Jewish Cultural Society'.

In March 1989, the founding meeting of the society took place. Simon Alperovitch was appointed as executive director.

On November 17, 1991, the founding conference of the Lithuanian Jewish Community took place in Vilnius, where a resolution was adopted to re-establish the Lithuanian Jewish Cultural Society with the name Lithuanian Jewish Community.

In 2012, it was proposed that certain monies anticipated as Holocaust compensation in Lithuania through the 'Good Will' scheme might be used to fund Lithuanian Jewish Community projects.

In 2019, threats received by phone and letter resulted in the closure of the LŽB headquarters and the Choral Synagogue in Vilnius. However, a few days later, following security guarantees, the LŽB welcomed the reopening of both the synagogue and their headquarters.

== Facilities ==
The LŽB Building houses a number of Lithuanian Jewish heritage facilities, including the State Jewish Museum, the Israel Center of Culture and Arts, the Center of Yiddish Culture and Music, and the Zalman Rejzen Foundation Supporting Jewish Culture, Education, and Science (named for Zalman Reisen).

== Leadership ==
- Michail Segal - Executive
- Faina Kukliansky - Chairperson

== See also ==
- History of the Jews in Lithuania
- Timeline of Jewish history in Lithuania and Belarus
