= Luokė =

- Town
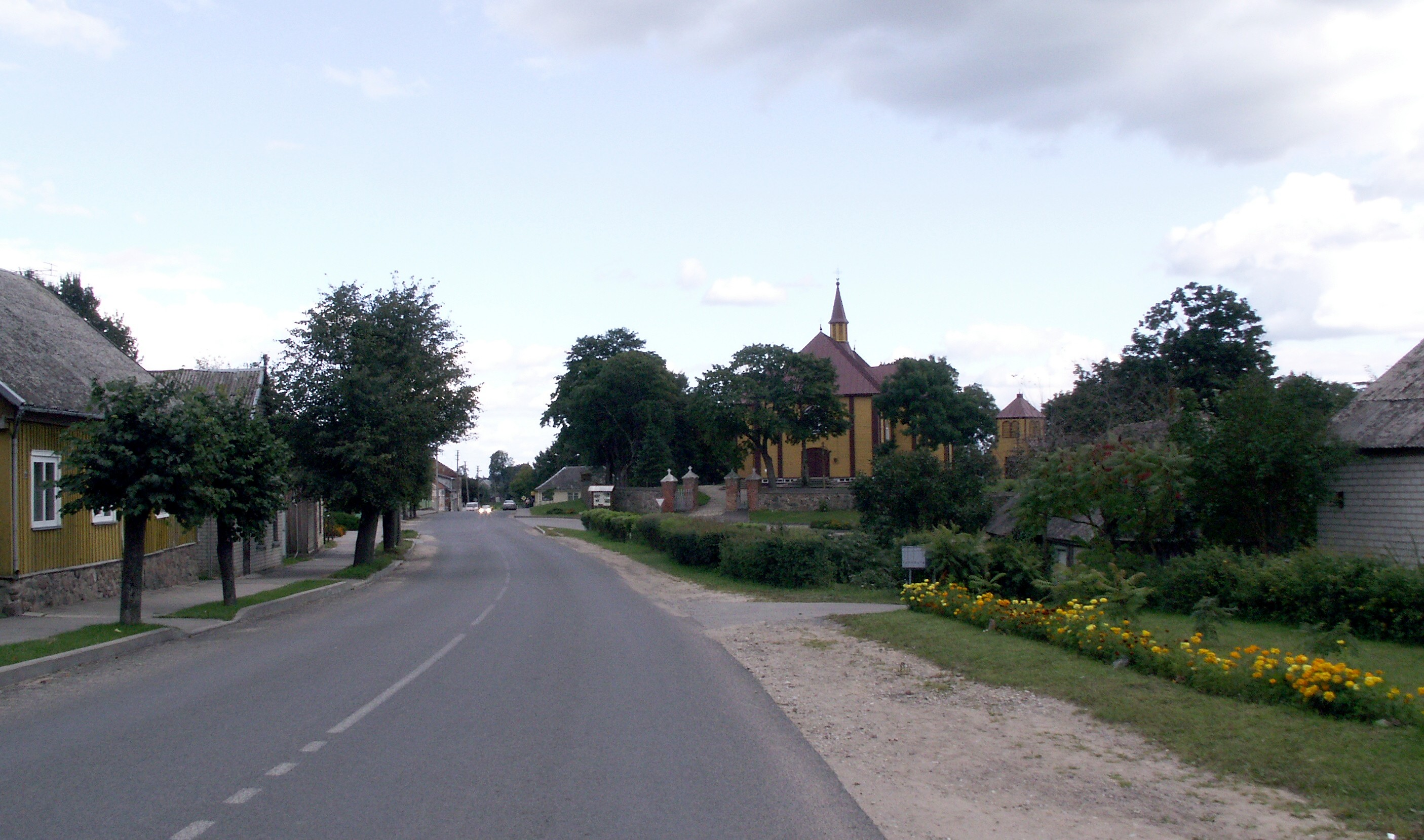

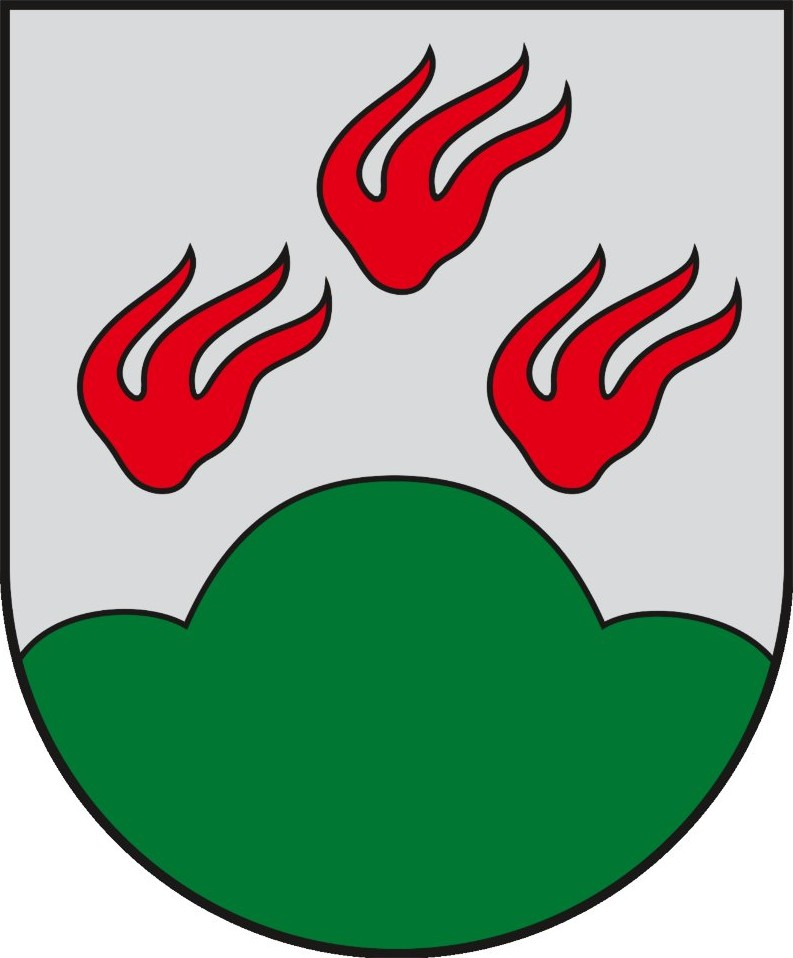
- Seal

- Location within Lithuania
- Coordinates: 55°53′38″N 22°31′30″E
- Country: Lithuania
- County: Telšiai County
- Municipality: Telšiai District Municipality
- Eldership: Luokė eldership

Population (2011)
  - Total: 629
- Time zone: UTC+2 (EET)
  - Summer (DST): UTC+3 (EEST)

Luokė (Samogitian: Loukė) is a town in Telšiai County, Lithuania. According to the 2011 census, the town has a population of 629 people. The Church of All Saints is located in the town.

Luoke had a Jewish community for approximately 400 years. In the 16th century, Jews settled in the town, and called it Luknik (לוקניק in Yiddish). By the middle of the 19th century, there were 798 Jews, representing half the total population. After an 1887 fire, and an 1888 blood libel and near-pogrom, many Jews left. In 1940, the Soviet Union nationalised the factories and shops of the remaining 300 Jews, closed the Hebrew school, and banned Zionist organisations. In June 1941, after Nazi takeover, locals humiliated the town's Jews, tortured the rabbi and cut off his beard, took hostages to extract a 50,000 rouble "fine" from the community (at a time when an unskilled worker might earn 1,000 roubles per annum), and turned the town's Jews over to the Nazi-controlled Lithuanian Auxiliary Police, at whose hands many experienced rape and forced labour. In July 1942, the police (under Nazi supervision) stole the Jews' possessions and murdered them; 120 men were murdered and buried in a mass grave at nearby Gudiškė, while the women and children were murdered and buried at Geruliai, together with the women and children from nearby towns: see, e.g., The Holocaust in Telšiai.

Rabbi Chaim Rabinowitz, who became head of the Telshe Yeshiva in Telšiai, was born in Luoke in 1856.
