= Faina Kukliansky =

Jewish Lithuanian lawyer

Faina Kukliansky (born September 9, 1954) is a Lithuanian lawyer and a chairwoman of the Lithuanian Jewish (Litvaks) community.

== Biography ==
Faina Kukliansky comes from a family of Holocaust survivors that lived in Veisiejai, Lithuania.

In 1977 she graduated from Vilnius University, and from 1977 to 1991 she worked as criminalist and prosecutor in law enforcement agencies of the Lithuanian SSR. Currently she works as an attorney and is registered as a lobbyist.

As of 2024, she is a member of the Executive Committee of the European Jewish Congress. In 2013 she was elected as a Chairwoman of the Lithuanian Jewish (Litvak) Community; she was re-elected in 2017 and in 2021.

She speaks Yiddish, Hebrew, English, Polish, Russian, and Lithuanian.

== Family ==
Her grandmother Zisl was killed, as well as the whole of her mother's family were killed, but her father (Samuel Kukliansky, a lawyer (Note: Samuel Kukliansky was a Lithuanian attorney, expert on criminology, and a professor at the Vilnius University. Born and raised in Veisiejai, he survived the Holocaust, and graduated from the Law Faculty of Vilnius University in 1953.)) and mother survived. Both her father and mother Klara are deceased and buried in Israel.

Her son Rafael is a sound engineer and DJ, and currently resides in Australia. Her daughter Ruth is a clinical psychologist, and resides and works in Vilnius, Lithuania.

== Awards ==
- 2024: Officer's Cross of the Order for Merits to Lithuania
- 2024: Order of Merit of the Federal Republic of Germany "for her tireless work commemorating Lithuanian Holocaust victims and long-term efforts to unite the LJC including enhancing the organization’s role on the national and international level."
- 2019: Lithuanian Diplomacy Star "in recognition of her active involvement in organizing international dialogue and important agreements, cooperation between the LJC and Foreign Ministry, her contribution to making the Goodwill Law a reality and the active involvement of the LJC under her leadership in projects at Lithuanian diplomatic offices."
- 2014: Award from the YIVO Institute for Jewish Research for her contributions to strengthening the Jewish community in Lithuania
- Knight's Cross of the Order for Merits to Lithuania
