= Šukioniai =

Village in Lithuania

- Village
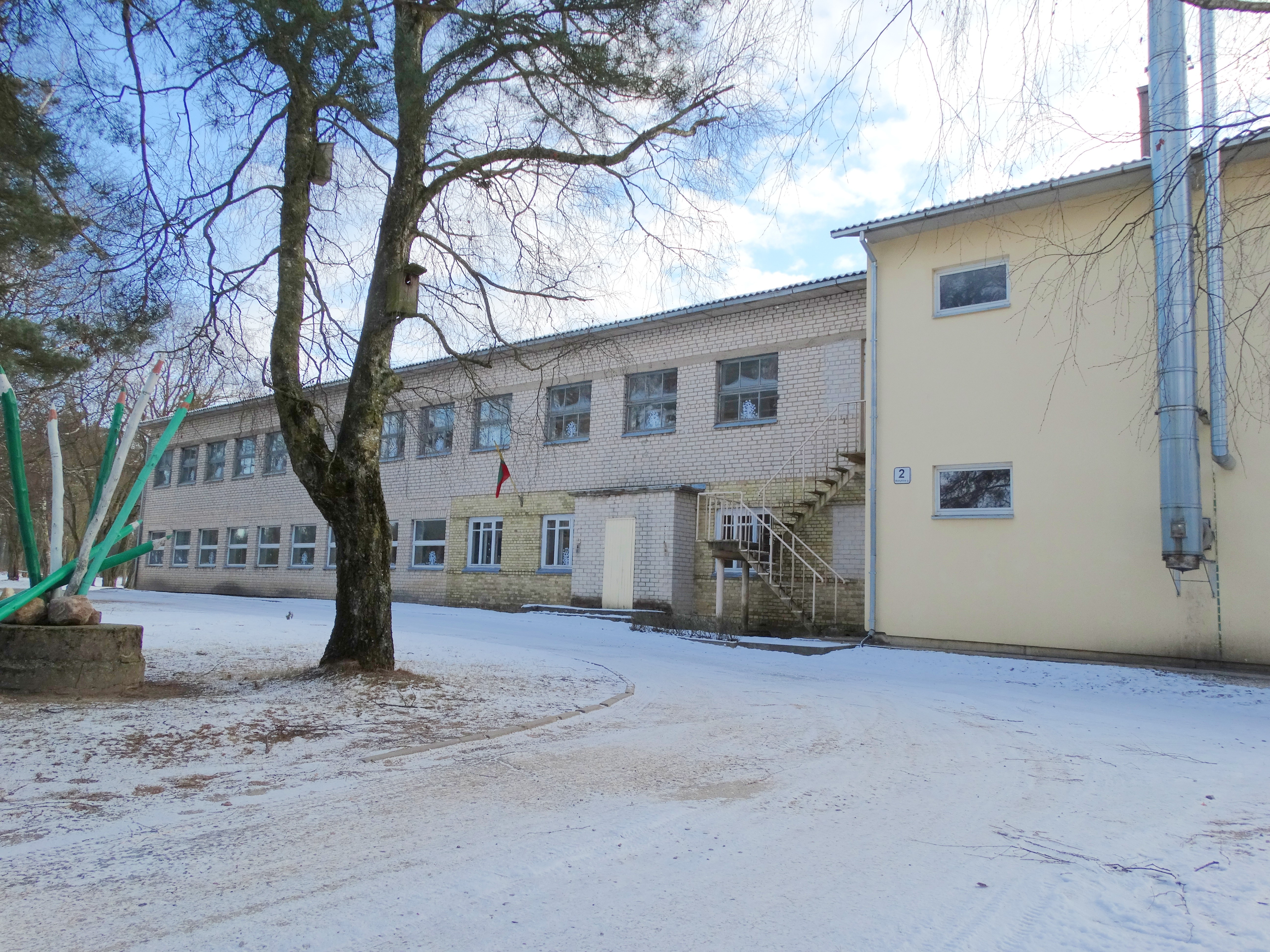
- School in Šukioniai named after Jonas Noreika

- Location of Šukioniai
- Coordinates: 55°56′30″N 23°43′00″E
- Country: Lithuania
- County: Šiauliai County
- Municipality: Pakruojis District Municipality
- Eldership: Lygumai Eldership
- First mentioned: 1372

Population (2011)
  - Total: 357
- Time zone: UTC+2 (EET)
  - Summer (DST): UTC+3 (EEST)

Šukioniai is a village in the southwest of Pakruojis District Municipality, Lithuania. It is located near Vėzgė stream about 12 kilometres (7.5 mi) southwest of Pakruojis.

A hill fort at the location was destroyed by an attack of the Livonian Order in August 1372.

Jonas Noreika, an anti-Soviet partisan accused of collaborating in the Holocaust, was born in the village in 1910. The village school is named after Noreika.
