= Šatrija =

Hill and hillfort in Lithuania

Coordinates: 55°52′21.3″N 22°33′29.7″E

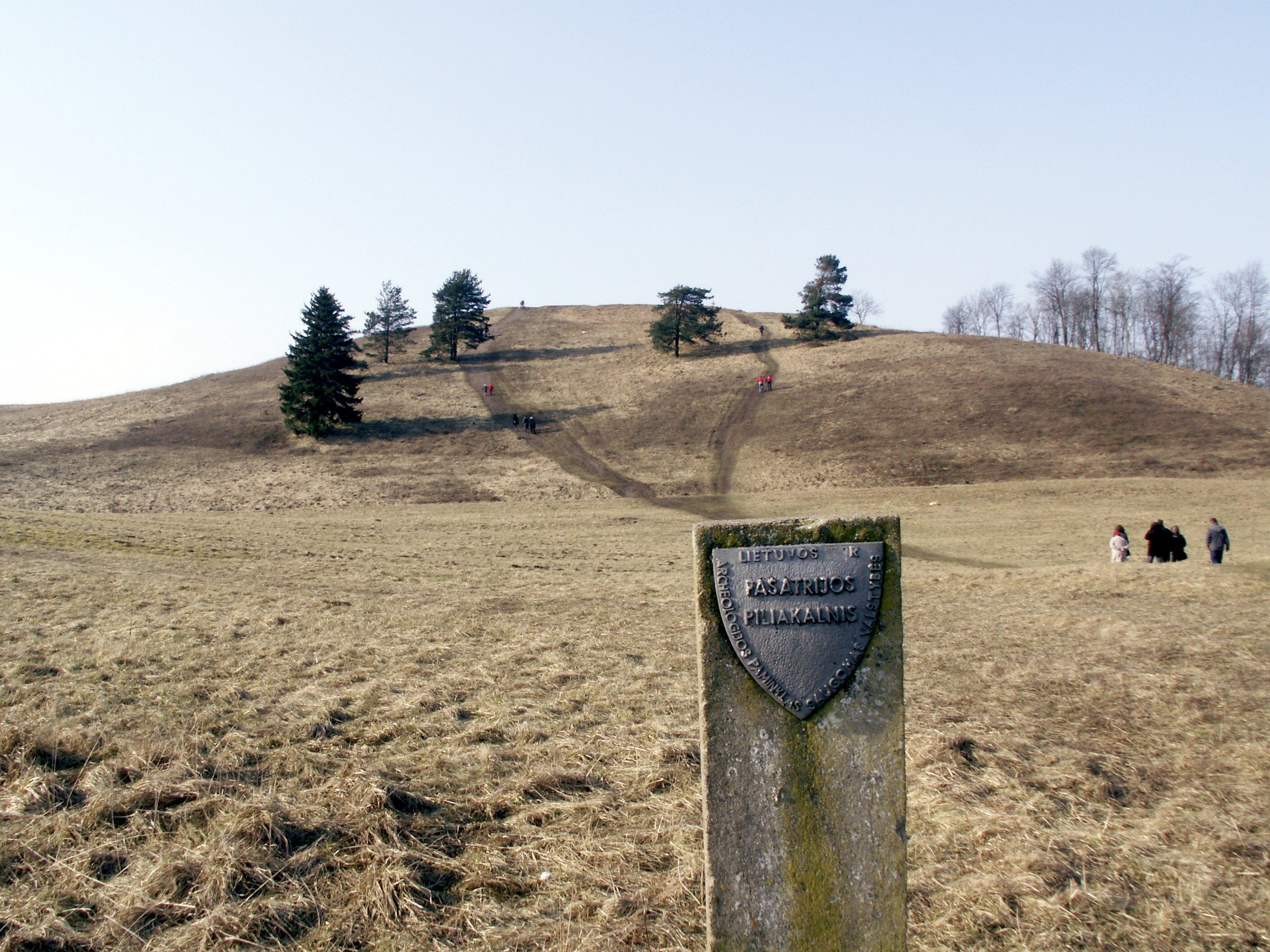
Pašatrija Hillfort

Šatrija is a hill and a hillfort in the Samogitia region of Lithuania, near the Pašatrija village, Luokė seniūnija, Telšiai District Municipality. It is part of the Šatrija Landscape Reserve.

The hill is 228 metres (748 ft) in height and was formed during the last glacial period.

== Archaeology ==
It is an archeological site no. A1939K and a registered cultural monument no. AR1199 of Lithuania with the official names "Pašatrijos piliakalnis su gyvenviete" [Pašatrija Hillfort with Settlement] and "Luokės piliakalnis" [Luokė Hillfort].

The first excavations started in 1835, and the site was dated by the 1st millennium BCE. A wooden castle stood on its top at some time in 14th century. Researchers think that before the Christianization of Lithuania, an important pagan temple was located on the hill.

== Name ==
The origin of the name is associated with a legend that this was the place of Samogitia's witches' Sabbath. One day they danced too long, until the roosters' crows. All witches quickly flew away, but one misplaced her besom (on which witches fly) and started running around shouting "Where is my šatra?", hence the name (šatra is a twig from a besom).

== See also ==
- List of hillforts in Lithuania
