= Plungė massacre =

1941 killings in Lithuania

Coordinates: 55°55′N 21°51′E

The Plungė massacre (in Yiddish Plungyan – פלונגיאן) was a World War II massacre committed on 13 or 15 July 1941 in the town of Plungė, in Lithuania. Following the anti-Soviet June Uprising in Lithuania and the German invasion as part of Operation Barbarossa, Plungė was captured by German forces on 25 June 1941. Lithuanian nationalists, led by Jonas Noreika, formed a town administration and police force. Lithuanians accused 60 young Jewish men of being a rear guard for the Red Army; shortly after the town's capture, German forces killed these men. On 13 or 15 July Lithuanian nationalists transported the Jews to ditches near the village of Kausenai where they were shot. Of the 1,700-1,800 remaining Jews of Plungė, only a few survived.

== Background ==
Jews first arrived in Plungė in 1348; by 1900, the Jewish population of more than 2,500 comprised more than half of the people of the town.

After the June Uprising in Lithuania and the German invasion of the Soviet Union, Plungė was occupied by German forces on 25 June 1941.

== Ghetto and repressions ==
Lithuanian nationalists led by Jonas Noreika formed a town administration and police force.

On 26 June 1941, the Lithuanians forced the Jews to the area around the local Beth midrash and synagogue which they declared a ghetto. Lithuanians took Jews out of the ghetto to perform hard manual labor, accompanied by humiliation and beatings, and some were murdered and did not return to the ghetto. The living conditions (filth, overcrowding, lack of food and water) in the ghetto led to high mortality and disease, particularly so among the elderly. Valuables were extorted from the Jews by the Lithuanian authorities.

== Massacre ==
On 13 or 15 July the Lithuanian nationalists transported the Jews to ditches near the village of Kaušėnai in Nausodis eldership where they were shot. Of the 1,700–1,800 Jews of Plungė, only a few survived. Survivors included people deported to the Soviet Union prior to the German invasion, and six who were sheltered by Lithuanian friends.

Catholic priest Petras Lygnugaris baptized 74 young Jewish girls in an effort to spare them, but the Lithuanian activists killed them there, notwithstanding. Plungė was perhaps the first town in German-occupied Europe where all of the Jewish inhabitants were murdered, including children, women and the elderly.

== Aftermath ==
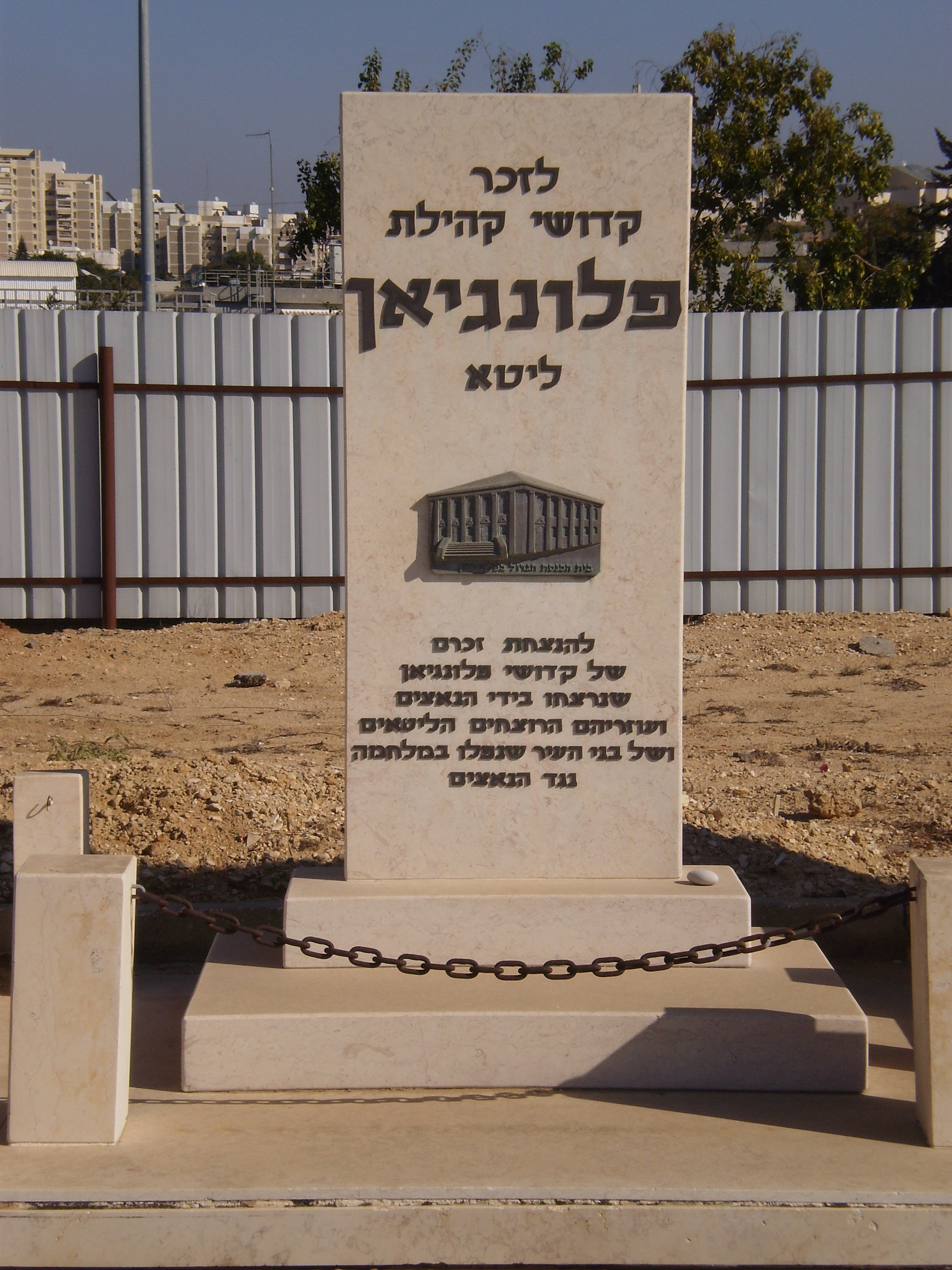
Memorial in Holon, Israel

72 Plungė Jews joined the Red Army, of whom 42 died in combat. Following the war there were 138 Jews in Plungė, most emigrated to Israel, South Africa, and the United States. By 1970, 45 remained. By 2002, Jacob Bunka was the last Jew in Plungė. Bunka died in 2014. Bunka created massive wooden sculptures commemorating the massacres in Plunge and other sites as well as the life of the Jewish community.

Remembrance sites for the events of 1941 exist in and around the town. A memorial wall bearing the names of most of the 1,800 killed Jews stands at the Kaušėnai Holocaust memorial.

Jonas Noreika was executed for treason in 1947.

== See also ==
- Holocaust in Telšiai
