= Geruliai =

- Village
- Location of Geruliai
- Coordinates: 55.978°N 22.393°E
- Country: Lithuania
- County: Telšiai County
- Municipality: Telšiai District Municipality
- Eldership: Degaičiai eldership

Population (2001)
  - Total: 95
- Time zone: UTC+2 (EET)
  - Summer (DST): UTC+3 (EEST)

Geruliai is a village located in the Telšiai District Municipality, 10 kilometers from Telšiai, Lithuania. According to the census of 2001, the village has a population of 95.

== History ==
During World War II, in summer 1941, 1,500 to 2,000 Jews from local shtetls were murdered in mass executions perpetrated by an Einsatzgruppen of Lithuanian policemen.
