= Jonas Noreika =

Lithuanian army officer

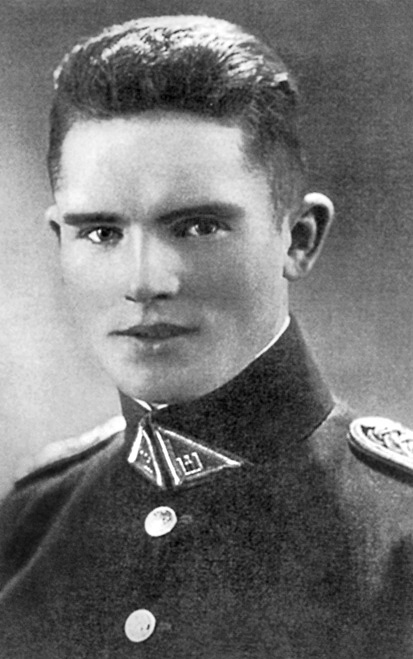
- Noreika in 1925
- Born: 8 October 1910; Šukioniai, Kovno Governorate, Russian Empire
- Died: 26 February 1947 (aged 36); Vilnius, Lithuanian SSR, Soviet Union
- Cause of death: Execution by shooting
- Resting place: Tuskulėnai Manor, Vilnius, Lithuania
- Other name: Generolas Vėtra ('General Storm')
- Education: Vytautas Magnus University
- Known for: Plungė massacre
- Spouse: Antanina Krapavičiūtė
- Awards: Order of the Cross of Vytis (1997)
- Convictions: Treason; War crimes
- Penalty: Death

Jonas Noreika (8 October 1910 – 26 February 1947), also known by his post-war nom de guerre Generolas Vėtra (lit. 'General Storm'), was a Lithuanian anti-Soviet partisan, military officer, and Nazi collaborator.

In July 1941, he was the leader of the Lithuanian Activist Front in the Telšiai district. Noreika later served as governor of the Šiauliai district during the Nazi occupation of Lithuania, where he signed orders confining the district's Jews in a ghetto and confiscating their property. Noreika later became one of 46 Lithuanian authority and intellectual figures imprisoned by the Nazis at Stutthof concentration camp from March 1943 until the camp's dissolution on 25 January 1945 for inciting resistance to Nazi mobilization efforts. During the Soviet occupation of Lithuania, Noreika was drafted into the Soviet Army, then worked as a jurist in Vilnius, where he was an organizer of the anti-Soviet Lithuanian National Council. He was arrested by the Soviets in March 1946 and executed on 26 February 1947.

== Biography ==
=== Early life ===
Noreika was born in Šukioniai in western Lithuania in 1910. He studied law at Vytautas Magnus University, and went on to serve in the military. He wrote for the military press, served on a military tribunal, and was later promoted to captain.

In 1933, Noreika published an anti-Semitic booklet titled Hold Your Head High, Lithuanian!!!, which called for a total economic boycott of Lithuanian Jews on nationalistic grounds. In 1939, in the military magazine Kardas, he published an essay, "The Fruitfulness of Authoritarian Politics", praising the leadership of Adolf Hitler and Benito Mussolini.

=== Occupation of Lithuania ===
Soviet forces occupied Lithuania in June 1940, and Noreika was released into the reserves that October. He is credited as the leading organizer in Samogitia of the underground, anti-Soviet Lithuanian Activist Front (LAF). Noreika was also a prominent publisher in Plungė of underground leaflets, including Brangūs vergaujantys broliai! ('Dear Slaving Brothers!', 1941) which called for ethnic cleansing.

Noreika made several trips to Nazi Germany with the help of former police officer Kazys Šilgalis, and maintained contact with Pilypas Narutis of LAF Kaunas and Juozas Kilius of LAF Vilnius. However, and Voldemarists Klemensas Brunius and Stasys Puodžius of LAF Königsberg, liaisons with the German army's high command Oberkommando der Wehrmacht, military intelligence Abwehr, and LAF's network of messengers.

At the start of the June Uprising in Lithuania, on 22 June 1941, Noreika led a platoon of farmers and youths in Mardosai. German scouts brought him to Memel, where he was given instructions, armbands, and weapons.

=== World War II ===
In July 1941, Noreika's rebels held the 1,800 Jews of Plungė in a synagogue for two weeks. For several days, Lithuanian nationalists under the command of Noreikas took groups of 50 Jews at a time and killed them near the village of Milašaičiai. Finally, on 12 July, the nationalists started fires in the town, which they blamed on the Jews. Noreika gave the order to massacre the Jews of Plungė, and the nationalists marched and conveyed the remaining Jews to a site near Kaušėnai and killed them there on 12–13 July. Catholic priest Petras Lygnugaris baptized 74 Jewish women but they were killed nonetheless.

On 20 July, Noreika led a "Manifestation of Freedom and Friendship with Germany," where a crowd of thousands approved a resolution that he had written in support of Lithuania's Provisional Government and complete independence, as well as the German Army, the Reich and Hitler, and the Lithuanian Activist Front. A week and a half later, a group of Samogitian local leaders chose Noreika to head the Iron Wolf-affiliated Žemaičių žemė ('Land of Samogitia') delegation, which was tasked with negotiating unity between the Provisional Government, the Lithuanian Activist Front and the Lithuanian Nationalist Party. On 30 July, Noreika participated in a committee in Telšiai which sentenced Jurgis Endriuška to three months of a labour camp for leading a Communist Youth choir.

Noreika was appointed governor of the Šiauliai district on 3 August 1941. He issued orders on 22 August and 10 September 1941 on sending all the Jews of the district to ghettos and on the confiscation and distribution of their property. Many Jews were shot on the spot instead. Noreika also sent a proposal on 23 August to Lithuania's General Counselors that they permit the construction of a forced labour camp at Skaistgirys to imprison 200 Lithuanian "undesirables." Noreika returned to Plungė, and his family moved into a home nearby on Vaižganto 9, which had belonged to the Jewish Orlianskis family. He was sent by the Nazis on a propaganda trip to Germany from 31 January 1943 to 16 February 1943 as part of a group of 14 Lithuanian officials.

==== Arrest ====
Noreika was arrested and dismissed from his position of governor on 23 February 1943, for failing to fulfil orders to raise a Waffen-SS division from the local population. On 17 March, the Nazis again arrested Noreika along with 45 other Lithuanian political, intellectual and religious authorities, and the group was brought to the Stutthof concentration camp on 26–27 March. They were housed separately from other inmates, allowed to wear civilian clothes, move about freely throughout the camp, receive parcels, write letters, and continue their education. Noreika studied English, but persisted in believing that the Nazis would defeat the Allies. In 1944, when the Germans retreated, Noreika was evacuated with other prisoners. The Soviets moved Noreika with other former concentration camp inmates to barracks in Stolp (Słupsk, Poland). There, in early May 1945, he was mobilized into the Soviet Army.

=== Post-war ===
In November 1945, Noreika returned to Vilnius, where he found work as a legal advisor to the Library of the Lithuanian Academy of Sciences. Soon, along with Ona Lukauskaitė-Poškienė and Stasys Gorodeckis, Noreika founded the self-proclaimed National Council of Lithuania, which worked to centralize anti-Soviet partisan forces throughout the country. Noreika assumed the rank of general and the nom de guerre Generolas Vėtra ('General Storm'). Soviet authorities arrested Noreika and other leaders of the council on 16 March 1946. When first interrogated, Noreika claimed that he worked for Soviet military counter-intelligence SMERSH, but three weeks later, he asserted that he had lied. Noreika was sentenced to death on 27 November 1946. He was executed on 26 February 1947, and buried in a mass grave by Tuskulėnai Manor.

== Legacy and controversy ==
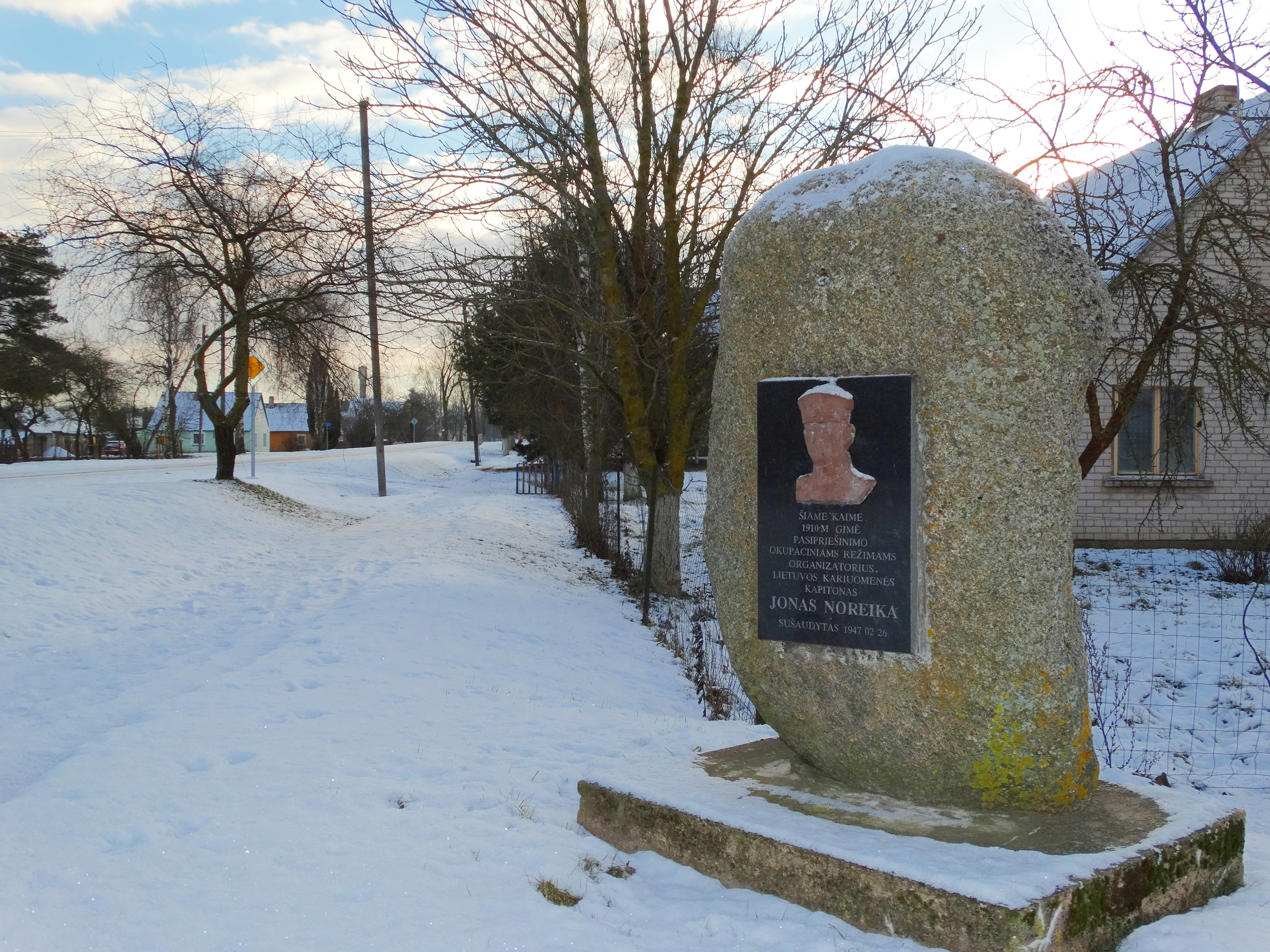
Memorial stone in Šukioniai, where Noreika was born

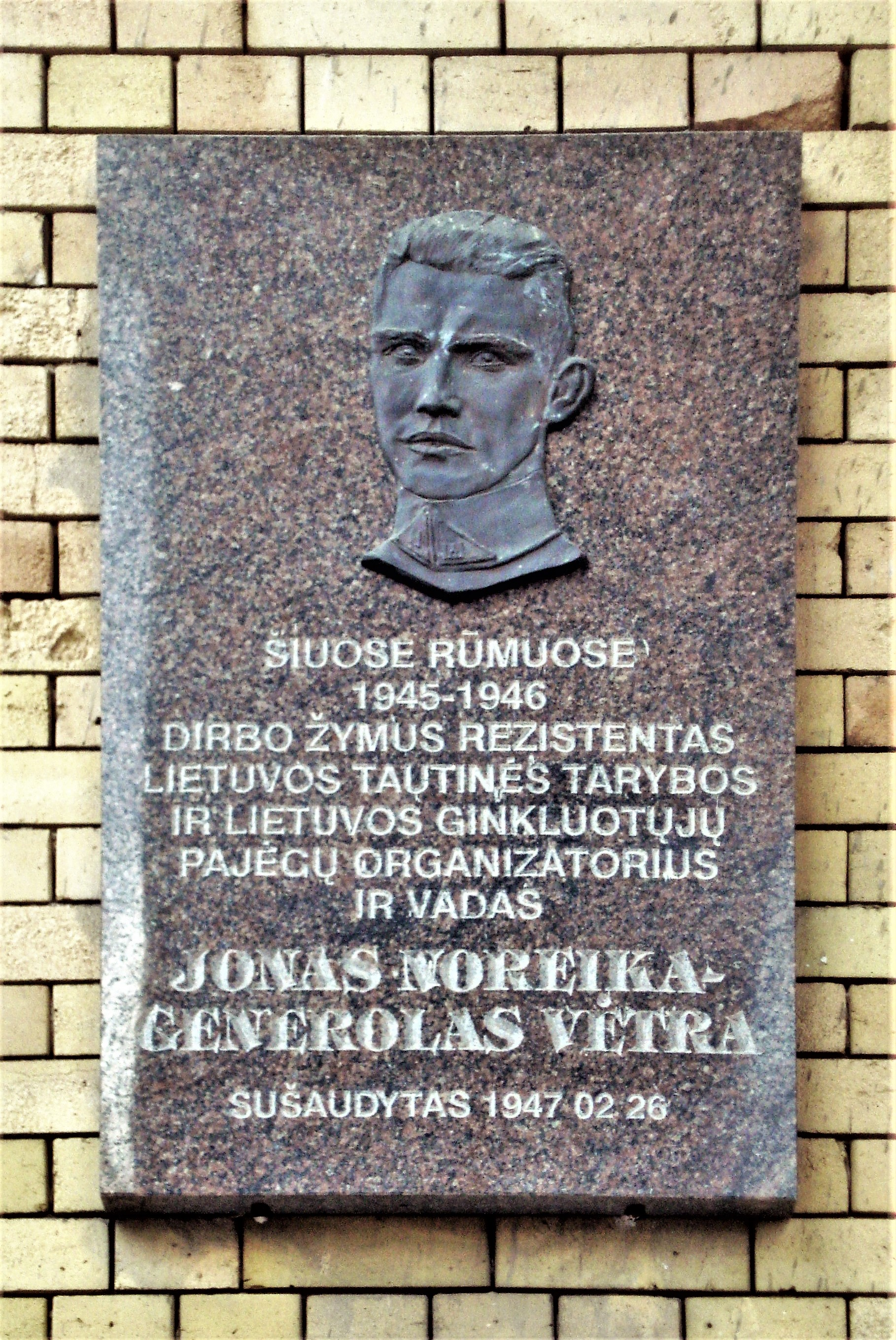
Memorial plaque for Noreika at the Library of Academy of Science in Vilnius

A village school and several streets in Lithuania are named after Noreika. In 1997, the Lithuanian state awarded Noreika with the Order of the Cross of Vytis, first degree. Commemorative plaques were also placed at the entrances of the Lithuanian Academy of Sciences and the Museum of Occupations and Freedom Fights.

Noreika has been criticized by numerous scholars and organisations for his active role in the Holocaust in Lithuania. The state-run Genocide and Resistance Research Centre of Lithuania (LGGRTC) denies these claims, and argues that Noreika misunderstood the true purpose of the Nazi ghettos, and in fact saved the lives of Jews in Šiauliai. A sub-commission of the International Commission for the Evaluation of the Crimes of the Nazi and Soviet Occupation Regimes in Lithuania found the LGGRTC's findings unacceptable and offensive, and objected to the commemoration of Noreika. In 2018, Grant Gochin, a South African Jew of Litvak ancestry, filed a lawsuit against the LGGRTC for the charge of Holocaust denial, in support of which Noreika's granddaughter Silvia Foti filed an affidavit. The lawsuit was dismissed by the Lithuanian courts.

The memorial plaque at the Wroblewski Library of the Lithuanian Academy of Sciences was destroyed on 7 April 2019 in a livestreamed demonstration by human rights attorney Stanislovas Tomas. Though Mayor of Vilnius Remigijus Šimašius initially stated that there were no plans to restore the destroyed plaque, on 9 April he announced that the plaque would be restored after documents confirming its initial placing in 1998 were found. The new plaque was removed by the Vilnius municipality on 27 July 2019, days after the changing of a street name honouring another collaborator, Kazys Škirpa. However, in September 2019, the Lithuanian nationalist youth organisation Pro Patria installed a new commemorative plaque in place of the previous one. The plaque remains the subject of legal and political controversy and a focal point of disagreements about the role of Lithuanians like Noreika and the Provisional Government of Lithuania in the Holocaust.

On 27 January 2021, the New York Times published an opinion piece by Noreika's granddaughter, journalist Silvia Foti, in which she says,

"I learned that the man I had believed was a savior who did all he could to rescue Jews during World War II had, in reality, ordered all Jews in his region of Lithuania to be rounded up and sent to a ghetto where they were beaten, starved, tortured, raped and then murdered."

Later that year, Foti published the book The Nazi's Granddaughter.
