= Į laisvę (daily) =

5 July 1941 issue

Į laisvę (transl. Towards Freedom) was a Lithuanian-language daily newspaper published in Kaunas from 24 June 1941 to 31 December 1942. Į laisvę and Naujoji Lietuva published in Vilnius were the only Lithuanian dailies published in German-occupied Lithuania. The newspaper was established by the Lithuanian Activist Front during the anti-Soviet uprising.

The newspaper published political news, anti-Soviet commentary, and articles on Lithuanian culture. It also disseminated antisemitic propaganda, including articles that blamed Jews for Soviet rule and supported discriminatory measures against the Jewish population. The newspaper was discontinued at the end of 1942 and replaced by Ateitis in January 1943. In 1943–1944, the Lithuanian Front published an underground anti-Nazi newspaper under the same title.

== History ==
=== Establishment ===
Germany invaded the Soviet Union on 22 June 1941. The Lithuanian Activist Front began the anti-Soviet uprising, organized the Provisional Government of Lithuania, and declared independence. According to memoirs of Antanas Mažulis, a group of Lithuanian activists planned on publishing an secret anti-Soviet periodical since February 1941 and made plans to take over a printing press in case of war between Germany and the Soviet Union. However, the plans were ruined when six activists were arrested by the Soviet NKVD during the June deportation.

According to Mažulis, the first issue of Į laisvę was organized mainly by Jonas Virbickas. The newspaper considered three titles, Laisvės kelias (Road of Freedom), Laisvė (Freedom), and Lietuva (Lithuania) but Juozas Ambrazevičius, prime minister of the provisional government, decided to name it Į laisvę. The first issue was published on 24 June by the Activist Front – it was a two-page newspaper prepared and published in a hurry just as Germans were entering the city and was distributed for free.

=== Liquidation ===
The newspaper was popular. Its circulation reached 100,000 copies by the end of July 1941 and 200,000 copies by the end of the year. However, war-time paper shortage forced periodicals to cut their runs. In October 1942, the circulation of Į laisvę was decreased to 98,000 copies at the same time cutting the number of pages to four.

Į laisvę was profitable and provided stipends to Lithuanian students. According to memoirs of Mažulis, this attracted criticism from the German civil administration but it was motivated by greed rather than politics – several Lithuanians wanted to take over the profitable business. The newspaper was defended by the Lithuanian councilor for education Pranas Germantas and the German military authorities.

Nevertheless, the newspaper was discontinued on 31 December 1942, and was replaced by Ateitis which was first published by Bronius Daunoras on 4 January 1943. An illegal newspaper by the same Į laisvę name was published by the Lithuanian Front in 1943–1944 becoming one of the key anti-Nazi periodicals. It was published by some of the same personnel of the daily Į laisvę.

== Content ==
The first issues published proclamations of the Provisional Government of Lithuania, but its name disappeared from the newspaper by 30 June 1941. Liūtas Mockūnas interpreted this as the date when German authorities implemented censorship. This is confirmed by the 30 June order received by commandant Jurgis Bobelis to submit all publications to German censorship. According to Kęstutis Skrupskelis, the provisional government was able to publish just a few texts and all of them were meant to calm the moods and stabilize the situation. Overall, any references to Lithuania as a country or sovereign state disappeared by the end of July 1941.

According to the memoirs of Antanas Juozas Mažiulis, the German censors were strict. Each article had to be translated to German and a copy sent to Berlin. Some of the translations were done by the writer Ieva Simonaitytė. The censors would not allow to publish patriotic poems by Maironis, an article commemorating an anniversary of the Act of Independence of Lithuania, or even works of fiction as they did not further the war effort. Mažiulis described subtle ways that Lithuanians attempted to identify German-dictated articles (e.g. printing them in the same place or leaving Germanisms).

The first issues were devoted to military and political news. It published news provided by Deutsches Nachrichtenbüro, translated speeches of Nazi officials. According to Mažiulis, the newspaper was prohibited from translating articles from the German press because they discussed plans for colonizing Eastern Europe. Į laisvę propagated the personality cult of Adolf Hitler as a military genius. At the same time, according to Mažulis, the newspaper avoided attacks against the West (France, Great Britain).

As the newspaper grew, its content became more varied – it added stories from everyday life, feuilletons, anecdotes, etc. Such texts were usually aimed at ridiculing the Soviets. Į laisvę began publishing texts on culture and literature in 1942 and advertisements in the second half of 1942 indicating that it had become more commercial.

== Antisemitism ==
Į laisvę published antisemitic texts in nearly every issue. The very first issue thanked Germany, Wehrmacht, and Adolf Hitler for liberating Lithuania from the Soviet oppression. It also rejoiced that communists and Jews were running away because Bolshevism and Jews were one and the same. However, at the same time, it "strictly prohibited" extrajudicial revenge and excess violence against "unreliable people". This order was left unsigned, unlike the next day's order of commandant Jurgis Bobelis who threatened death penalty for stealing. Researcher Linas Venclauskas speculated that it could indicate that the order against violence was unpopular.

On 28 June and 30 June 1941, the newspaper published antisemitic excerpts from Mein Kampf. The newspaper blamed Jews for the Soviet occupation and repressions. It also supported the struggle for the New Order in Europe. It published news on restrictions faced by Jews (e.g. requirement to wear a yellow badge, being confined to ghettos, or being forced to work) which were welcomed as an opportunity for Lithuanians to gain economic advantage. On 5 July 1941, it published an article urging to cleanse Lithuania of Jews where it was suggested to exile Jews to Birobidzhan (administrative centre of the Jewish Autonomous Oblast in Russia) or to the Lublin Ghetto. It ended with a call to violence as Jews, Poles, and Russians must cut down like mushrooms as soon as possible.

Despite these articles, according to Mažulis, in September–October 1941, Germans criticized the newspaper for insufficient attacks against the Jews and Bolsheviks and for lack of promotion of Nazi ideology. According to him, Germans pushed the newspaper to print articles about The Protocols of the Elders of Zion, blood libel case in Punia, etc.

As the majority of the Lithuanian Jews were murdered by the end of 1941, the Jewish topic became less frequent in Į laisvę in 1942, though it continued to publish articles on the Jewish plot for world domination.

== Publishers and personnel ==
The newspaper identified the Lithuanian Activist Front as its publisher from the first issue until 7 August 1941 with an exception of the 24 July issue. On that day, voldemarininkai organized a coup and attempted to take control of the Provisional Government of Lithuania and Į laisvę. According to the memoirs of Antanas Juozas Mažiulis, voldemarininkai could not take over the newspaper because German censors demanded return of the previous editors. From 8 August to 9 October 1941, the newspaper did not identify its publisher. The new publisher, a firm called Spaudos žodis, was named in the 10 October 1941 issue. The company was headed by Kazys Bauba. Kęstutis Skrupskelis observed that in its layout and design, the newspaper was similar to XX amžius and suggested that the same people were responsible for publishing them.

The newspaper did not identify its editors, and most articles and editorials were left unsigned. There is no known list of editorial staff or correspondents, thus making identification of authors nearly impossible. It also makes very difficult to determine which texts were original, which were copied, and which were dictated by the German authorities.

In his memoirs, Antanas Juozas Mažiulis identified Kazys Bauba, Jonas Virbickas, and Julijonas Būtėnas as editors-in chief. He also identified Stasys Selėnas, Balys Dundulis, Juozas Žlabys-Žengė, Kęstutis Čerkeliūnas as editorial staff of Į laisvę. Juozas Ambrazevičius identified Zenonas Ivinskis as the author of the lead article of the first issue. In August–September 1941, Juozas Girnius published a series of six articles explaining the ideology of Nazism based on Mein Kampf.

== Bibliography ==
- Bartkutė, Roberta (2020). "Hitlerio asmens kulto atspindžiai 1941–1944 m. Kaune leistoje spaudoje". Kauno istorijos metraštis (in Lithuanian). 18: 161–188. ISSN 2335-8734.
- Bražiūnas, Mantas (May 2016). "The Darkest Page in the History of Lithuanian Journalism: Anti-Semitism in Legal Press During the Second Half of 1941". Žurnalistikos tyrimai. 10: 110–146. doi:10.15388/zt/jr.2016.10.10699. ISSN 2424-6042.
- Bubnys, Arūnas (1998). Vokiečių okupuota Lietuva (1941–1944) (in Lithuanian). Lietuvos gyventojų genocido ir rezistencijos tyrimo centras. ISBN 9986-757-12-6.
- Būtautas, N. (26 September 1981). ""Į Laisvę" verpetuose. Prisiminimai ir įspūdžiai iš spaudos darbo vokiečių okupacijoje" (PDF). Draugas. Mokslas, menas, literatūra (in Lithuanian). Vol. 225, no. 334. pp. 1–4.
- Kasparavičius, Algis (2006). "From the Lithuanian Press about the Jews during the Nazi Occupation, 1941–1942". In Levinson, Joseph (ed.). The Shoah (Holocaust) in Lithuania. Vilnius: The Vilna Gaon Jewish State Museum. ISBN 5-415-01902-2.
- Mažiulis, Antanas (1955). "Į laisvę pirmas lapas" (PDF). Į laisvę (in Lithuanian). Vol. 8, no. 45. pp. 22–27.
- Mockūnas, Liūtas (May 2002). "Kada prasidėjo vokiečių cenzūra?" (PDF). Akiračiai (in Lithuanian). 5 (339): 13–14. ISSN 1042-1580.
- Skrupskelis, Kęstutis (January 2002). "Apie "Į laisvę" ir kitus laikraščius" (PDF). Į laisvę (in Lithuanian). Vol. 136, no. 173. pp. 55–63. ISSN 1648-2506.
- Stasiulis, Stanislovas (2026). "New Allies–Old Foes: Ethnic Relations on the Pages of the Lithuanian Press during the German Occupation, 1941–44". In Woodworth, Bradley D.; Davoliūtė, Violeta; Staliūnas, Darius (eds.). Ethnic Relations in the Baltic Reconsidered. Central European University Press. pp. 307–326. ISBN 978-90-485-7045-4.
- Urbonas, Vytas (23 April 2021) [2018]. "„Į laisvę"". Visuotinė lietuvių enciklopedija (in Lithuanian). Mokslo ir enciklopedijų leidybos centras.
- Venclauskas, Linas (September 2002a). "Žydų stereotipas laikraštyje "Į laisvę": apie antisemitinį vokiečių okupacijos metais Kaune leistą laikraštį" (PDF). Akiračiai (in Lithuanian). 8 (342): 6–8. ISSN 1042-1580.
- Venclauskas, Linas (October 2002b). "Žydų stereotipas laikraštyje "Į laisvę": apie antisemitinį vokiečių okupacijos metais Kaune leistą laikraštį" (PDF). Akiračiai (in Lithuanian). 9 (343): 6–7, 12–13. ISSN 1042-1580.
