= Kęstutis (organisation) =

Kęstutis was an underground military Lithuanian resistance organisation that functioned from May 1942 to July–August 1944. It was the military wing of the Lithuanian Front (LF), an anti-Nazi and anti-Soviet movement, and its ultimate goal was the restoration of an independent Lithuanian state. The members of Kęstutis were called Kęstutėnai.

In parallel with Kęstutis, there existed another undergroung military organization, the Lithuanian Liberty Army (LLA), which ultimately overshadowed it in importance. According to Kęstutis Kasparas, this was because the LLA had neither the dictatorial leadership, nor was it strictly organized like Kęstutis, meaning that the LLA was more flexible, which proved to its advantage.

== Formation and organisation ==
Kęstutis was founded in Kaunas in May 1942. The organization was directly subordinate to the LF's leader Juozas Ambrazevičius. Kaunas was the location of the LF's central leadership, which consisted of Juozas Ambrazevičius, Adolfas Damušis, Pranas Vainauskas, Povilas Šilas and Matas Martinaitis. By the end of July, only Povilas Šilas remained in Lithuania from the central command, while others, including the head of Vilnius district Pranas Padalis, all left abroad. In the districts, counties and rural municipalities there were corresponding centers of 3 to 5 people.

The organisation followed the LF's statutes and programme and also created its own temporary statute. All while hiding from the German occupation administration, it organized military units, accumulated weapons, and prepared for the fight for the independence of Lithuania. The organization was organized in such a manner that it was headed by the headquarters (later the supreme headquarters), which consisted of 5 departments: armaments, organization of military units, reconnaissance (intelligence), military operations, and discipline.

Geographically, Kęstutis was divided into:

District	Also encompassed
Šiauliai	Mažeikiai, Telšiai, Kretinga, Tauragė, Raseiniai
Panevėžys	Panevėžys, Rokiškis, Utena, Zarasai, Biržai
Marijampolė	Marijampolė, Šakiai, Seinai, Vilkaviškis
Vilnius	Vilnius, Švenčionys, Trakai
Kaunas	Kaunas, Alytus, Kėdainiai, Ukmergė

The organization established smaller headquarters in Biržai, Kretinga, Raseiniai, Rokiškis, Šakiai, Telšiai, Utena, and Vilkaviškis. The most prominent figures of the organization: Zigmas Drunga, Juozas Jankauskas (chief of staff from the end of 1942), Jonas Noreika, A. Repšys, Antanas Šova, Narcizas Tautvilas, Bronius Vaivada, Juozas Vėbra, P. Vilutis (CoS from May 1942 to the end of 1942), Juozas Vitkus.

== 1944 ==
In reality, Kęstutis had around 2,000 members. The strength of Kęstutis was unevenly spread throughout the country, as it had stronger forces in Vilnius, Kaunas and Utena districts, but weaker ones in Tauragė and Telšiai districts. However, Kęstutis claimed that it had about 10,000 members in May 1944, which was true only formally. Kęstutis considered itself a political continuation of the Lithuanian Activist Front (LAF), so, the organisation claimed as its members all former armed members of the LAF (Lithuanian partisans and insurgents of the June Uprising in Lithuania). The LF planned that a future Lithuania would have its own army, so the main staff of Kęstutis planned to form 3 infantry divisions. Thus, the organisation registered 6,000 former Lithuanian Army officers and non-commissioned officers who would all be mobilized when the order was given.

=== Summer ===
==== May ====
The organization's supreme headquarters were commanded by a group of former Lithuanian Army colonels Juozas Jankauskas, Juozas Vėbra, Antanas Šova and Narcizas Tautvilis. As the Soviet Red Army approached the borders of Lithuania, Kęstutis' supreme command decided in May 1944 to change the organization's structure and tactics to be more suited for guerilla warfare. This meant that the members of Kęstutis had to operate in groups of 3–5 people and all the previously created units were disbanded.

The organization's members were ordered to hide their weapons and avoid battles with the Red Army, disobey Soviet mobilization, go into hiding, and start fighting the Soviet army only when the political and military situation was favorable. This meant that they were waiting for an escalation of the Cold War between the Soviet Union and the Western Allies into a new World War (see Operation Unthinkable, hypothetically scheduled for 1 July 1945).

==== June–July ====
The Colonels' decision was approved by the LF leadership and the Presidium of the Supreme Committee for the Liberation of Lithuania (VLIK). Thus, the command prepared instructions for all the members of Kęstutis. Although their choice was strategically sound, which was to focus on a one-time uprising in a favorable conflict situation (similarly to the successful 1941 June Uprising), but in practice, the organization was completely disorganized by the mass retreat westwards, as it broke the chain of command and it would only be possible to reconnect with each other and reestablish contact during an open uprising.

As the Kęstutis' leadership withdrew to Samogitia in summer 1944, the organization's lower ranks had to take initiative themselves, act according to the statute and carry out the organization's goals independently, so the members all had to act at their own discretion, which resulted in many different outcomes: some joined the Lithuanian Liberty Army (LLA), some retreated westwards in Lithuania with the Savigyna groups and joined the Fatherland Defense Force, while others simply waited.

In the absence of centralized leadership, Kęstutis members constantly faced the dilemmas when assessing the current situation, as there was no official permission from the command to join other organizations such as the LLA, a dilemma constantly arose: to join the general struggle for freedom, as circumstances required, and thereby violate the statute, or to try to subsume groups from other organizations into their own, which mean to continue fighting about organizational belonging without offering anything beyond that and without creating something serious.

Even in the case of LLA, with the presence of a centralized leadership, there was disorganization, but in Kęstutis it was a universal organizational collapse, and this structural collapse was masked by the choice of decentralized, individualistic tactics. Hypothetically, in the case of an uprising, this might not have been important, but the sort of guerilla warfare like the one that the Lithuanian partisans would wage over the coming decade required a better suited and more tangible organization. Nevertheless, members of Kęstutis, especially at the lowest county-level, tried to participate in all joint meetings and actions of the Lithuanian Resistance.

Kęstutis Kasparas writes that the organization ceased to practically function at the end of July 1944, as the leadership lost contact with each other. Some were arrested by the German occupiers, others were being hunted by the Gestapo, whereas others retreated westward in the face of the Soviet advance.

=== Lithuanian partisans ===
After the Soviet troops reoccupied Lithuania in 1944–45, many Kęstutis members became active participants in the Lithuanian partisans fighting the Soviet occupation.

== Sources ==
- Jankauskas, Juozas (2018). ""Kęstutis"". Visuotinė lietuvių enciklopedija (in Lithuanian).
- Kasparas, Kęstutis (1999). Lietuvos Karas [Lithuania's War] (PDF) (in Lithuanian). Kaunas: Lithuanian Union of Political Prisoners and Deportees. ISBN 9986-577-28-4.
