= Leonas Prapuolenis =

Lithuanian leader of 1941 uprisings

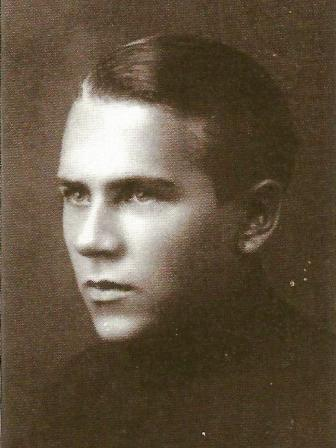
- Born: 9 June 1913; Daugėlaičiai, Suwałki Governorate, Russian Empire
- Died: 23 July 1972 (aged 59); Chicago, Illinois, U.S.
- Education: Vytautas Magnus University; Klaipėda Commerce Institute
- Known for: Leader of the June Uprising in Lithuania; Anti-Soviet resistance member
- Awards: Commander Cross of the Order of the Cross of Vytis

Leonas Prapuolenis (9 June 1913 – 23 July 1972) was a Lithuanian public figure, commander, and leader of the June Uprising of 1941 in Lithuania.

Born to a family of affluent farmers in Suvalkija, Prapuolenis was an active member of the Ateitininkai Catholic youth movement and a vocal opponent of the authoritarian regime of President Antanas Smetona. Therefore, he faced difficulties completing his education. For organizing a student strike to demand democracy, he was expelled from the Klaipėda Commerce Institute and given a four-year prison sentence in December 1938. However, he was allowed to resume his studies due to the changing political situation in the aftermath of the German ultimatum to Lithuania of March 1939.

After the Soviet Union occupation of Lithuania in June 1940, Prapuolenis joined the Lithuanian Activist Front (LAF) and started organizing the anti-Soviet June Uprising. When Germany invaded the Soviet Union and LAF members started the uprising, Prapuolenis read the independence proclamation at 9:28 a.m. on 23 June 1941 at the Kaunas radio station. Prapuolenis became the LAF representative to the Provisional Government of Lithuania. However, when Prapuolenis protested the German decision to disband the Provisional Government, he was arrested by the Gestapo and sent to the Dachau concentration camp. After five months, he was freed due to the efforts of Kazys Škirpa. Prapuolenis lived in Munich under police supervision, but kept contacts with Lithuanian resistance groups. After the war, he briefly lived in Austria and Switzerland before moving to West Germany in 1948 and the United States in 1955. He worked for the United Lithuanian Relief Fund of America (BALF), was an active member of the Supreme Committee for the Liberation of Lithuania (VLIK), and a board member of the Society of Friends of the Lithuanian Front.

== Biography ==
=== Early life and education ===
Prapuolenis was born into a family of affluent farmers. His father was elected burgomaster of Kybartai for twenty years. In 1922, Prapuolenis started his studies at the Marijampolė Rygiškių Jonas Gymnasium. In 1923, he was transferred to the newly established Žiburys gymnasium in Kybartai, which was later reorganized into the Kybartai junior commerce college. Starting in 1930, he was an active member of the Ateitininkai Catholic youth movement, and in 1931–1933, he was a leader of an Ateitininkai group in Kybartai. After graduating from the Kybartai college, Prapuolenis began studying economics at the Vytautas Magnus University. As a university student, he was a member of the Catholic student corporation Kęstutis and chairman of the student sports club Achilas.

In 1934, he moved to Klaipėda to study at the newly established Commerce Institute, and after the first year, he was conscripted into the Lithuanian Army. He applied to study at the War School of Kaunas instead, but his request was rejected due to his political activity and opposition to the regime of President Antanas Smetona. Prapuolenis won the case and graduated from the War School as a junior reserve lieutenant in 1936. After returning to the Commerce Institute, he was a member of the opposition movement – he chaired Catholic student corporation Gintaras, prepared the bi-weekly newspaper Bendras žygis for publication, and planned a student strike to demand democracy in Lithuania. Therefore, he was expelled from the institute in December 1938. Prapuolenis further received a four-year prison sentence but was spared by the changing political situation. When the new coalition government led by Jonas Černius, which included members of the Lithuanian Christian Democratic Party and Lithuanian Popular Peasants' Union, was formed in March 1939, Prapuolenis returned to his studies at the institute, which was relocated to Šiauliai as Lithuania lost Klaipėda to Nazi Germany. He graduated from the institute in fall 1939.

In 1939, together with Adolfas Damušis, Pranas Padalskis, and others, he established the chemical factory Gulbė (The Swan) in Kaunas.

=== Member of the resistance ===
Prapuolenis's grave at Saint Casimir Catholic Cemetery

After the Soviet Union occupation of Lithuania in June 1940, Gulbė was nationalized and Prapuolenis, feeling that he might become a target of Soviet repressions, went into hiding. Together with Adolfas Damušis, brigade general Motiejus Pečiulionis, and others, Prapuolenis established resistance groups (a network of fives) of the Lithuanian Activist Front (LAF) in Kaunas. Prapuolenis was a contact between LAF groups in Kaunas and Vilnius, led by major Vytautas Bulvičius. After the Vilnius LAF was liquidated by the NKVD and major Bulvičius was arrested, Prapuolenis became a leader of the LAF. When Germany invaded the Soviet Union and LAF members started the June Uprising against Soviet institutions in Lithuania, Prapuolenis read the independence proclamation at 9:28 a.m. on 23 June 1941 at the Kaunas radio station freed by the LAF rebels. Prapuolenis became the LAF representative to the Provisional Government of Lithuania.

On 15 September, after the Provisional Government was replaced by the German administration (Generalbezirk Litauen of the Reichskommissariat Ostland), Prapuolenis and other members of the LAF and the Provisional Government prepared a memorandum arguing against such German actions. The Germans responded by disbanding the LAF and imprisoning Prapuolenis in Tilsit on 27 September. He was sent to the Dachau concentration camp on 5 December 1941. On 7 April 1942, Prapuolenis was freed with the help of Kazys Škirpa. Prapuolenis was placed under police supervision in Munich without the right to visit Lithuania. He was allowed a short visit to Lithuania to attend his father's funeral in December 1942. Despite the German prohibitions, he participated in developing the strategy of the Lithuanian Front (LF), an anti-Nazi and anti-Soviet resistance group that replaced the LAF. Between 15 September and 8 October 1944, Prapuolenis, together with Zenonas Ivinskis and Pranas Padalskis, secretly visited German-occupied Lithuania and met anti-Soviet resistance members of the LF and the Lithuanian Liberty Army in Telšiai, Rietavas, and Kretinga.

Prepuolenis did not return to Nazi Germany. He briefly lived in Vienna and Bregenz, Austria. In May 1945, he moved to Switzerland and worked as a secretary of the United Lithuanian Relief Fund of America (BALF). In June 1948, he moved to Pfullingen in West Germany and continued working for the BALF. He joined the anti-Soviet organisation Supreme Committee for the Liberation of Lithuania (VLIK), was vice-chairman of the Society of Friends of the Lithuanian Front (Lietuvių fronto bičiulių sambūris), and was a correspondent of the Lithuanian daily newspaper Draugas published in Chicago. In 1952–1953, he was one of seven Lithuanian independence activists who were selected as assassination targets by the Soviet MGB. However, the plans failed when the MGB agent Rudolf Otting (codename Kirvis) defected to West Germany. In 1955, Prapuolenis moved to the United States and settled in Chicago. He was an active participant in various Lithuanian emigre organisations. He was buried at the Lithuanian cemetery of St. Casimir in Chicago.

Prapuolenis published articles in various Lithuanian periodicals, including XX amžius (20th century), Studentų dienos (The Days of Students), Į laisvę (Towards Freedom), and Tėvynės sargas (Guardian of the Fatherland).

== Legacy ==
In 2001, Prapuolenis was posthumously awarded the Commander Cross of the Order of the Cross of Vytis.

On 22 June 2009, a bas relief by sculptor Stasys Žirgulis was unveiled at the Vytautas Magnus University. The relief depicts six professors and students of the university who were the most active leaders of the Lithuanian Activist Front − Vytautas Bulvičius, Adolfas Damušis, Juozas Vėbra, Leonas Prapuolenis, Pilypas Narutis, and Juozas Ambrazevičius.
