= Vytautas Bulvičius =

Lithuanian leader of 1941 uprisings

- Bulvičius in the uniform of the Lithuanian Armed Forces
- Born: 5 May 1908; Kunigiškiai, Russian Empire
- Died: 17 December 1941 (aged 33); Gorky, Russian SFSR, Soviet Union
- Cause of death: Execution by shooting
- Education: War School of Kaunas; Higher Officers' Courses
- Occupation: Military officer
- Known for: Leader of the Lithuanian Activist Front
- Notable work: Karinis valstybės rengimas (Military Preparation of the State)
- Awards: Order of the Cross of Vytis; Order of the Lithuanian Grand Duke Gediminas

Vytautas Bulvičius (5 May 1908 – 17 December 1941) was a Lithuanian military officer, major of the General Staff, and leader of the anti-Soviet Lithuanian Activist Front (LAF).

Educated at War School of Kaunas and Higher Officers' Courses, Bulvičius became major of the General Staff in September 1938. He taught military discipline and resistance tactics at the Vytautas Magnus University and published a treatise Karinis valstybės rengimas (Preparing the State for War) in 1939 (republished in 1994 and 2018) discussing the upcoming war.

After the occupation of Lithuania by the Soviet Union in June 1940, he created the so-called "Bulvičius group", which in 1941 evolved into the Vilnius branch of the Lithuanian Activist Front (LAF). The group planned an anti-Soviet uprising (see June Uprising in Lithuania) at the outbreak of the German–Soviet War. Vilnius LAF was to lead the uprising and Bulvičius was reserved the seat of Minister of Defense in the Provisional Government of Lithuania. The group established radio contact with Germany, but this radio signal was detected by the Soviet NKVD and Bulvičius was arrested on 9 June 1941. Fifteen other people were arrested leading to the near liquidation of Vilnius LAF command. At the outbreak of the war on 22 June, the prisoners were transported to Gorky (now Nizhny Novgorod) and tried by the Military Tribunal of the Moscow Military District. Bulvičius and seven others were sentenced to death and executed on 17 December 1941.

== Interwar Lithuanian Army ==
Vytautas Bulvičius was born to the family of book smuggler and large farmer Juozas Bulvičius and his wife Marija Bulvičienė. Juozas Bulvičius owned the estate of Simanėliškiai. Vytautas was one of seven children. His elder brother Albinas was an aviation captain and was killed in a German aviation raid on 23 June 1941. In 1925, Bulvičius graduated from the gymnasium of Vilkaviškis.

On 7 September 1925, after graduating from the War School of Kaunas, Bulvičius was promoted to lieutenant and assigned to the 9th Infantry Regiment in Marijampolė. On 25 September 1928, he was transferred to the armoured vehicle detachment in Kaunas. On 23 November 1929, he was promoted to senior lieutenant. On 31 March 1931, Bulvičius transferred to the War School of Kaunas and graduated from machine gun courses at the Higher Officers' Courses on 1 February 1933. The same year he was promoted to captain. In 1934, Bulvičius married Marija Danevičiūtė.

In June 1937, he was one of the twenty graduates of the second class of the Officers' Courses of Vytautas the Great. He was then assigned to the General Staff of Lithuania and promoted to major of the General Staff in September 1938. From 12 March to 19 July 1940, Bulvičius was assigned to the 1st Infantry Regiment, deployed in Vilnius.

In October 1938, he started teaching military discipline and resistance tactics at the Vytautas Magnus University. The course covered basic principles of war, improvements in weaponry, security and defence of small nations, total war, armed forces, World War I, the upcoming war and Lithuania's situation in this war, preparation of armed forces, economic war, and the role of the society in preparing for war. Bulvičius also published articles on military and patriotic themes in military journals Kardas (The Sword) and Mūsų žinynas (Our Manual). In 1939, he published monograph Karinis valstybės rengimas (Preparing the State for War) based on his university lectures. In the book, Bulvičius emphasized the importance of moral and psychological preparedness of the military personnel. The truncated work was republished by the Lithuanian National Defence Volunteer Forces (SKAT) in 1994 and in full by the Ministry of National Defence in 2018. An English translation is being prepared by the Ministry.

== Lithuanian Activist Front ==
After the occupation of Lithuania by the Soviet Union in June 1940, the Soviets started the gradual liquidation of the Lithuanian Army. As a result, Bulvičius was sent to the 179th Rifle Division of the Red Army's 29th Lithuanian Territorial Rifle Corps. At the same time, he was assigned as lecturer to the War School of Kaunas which was moved to Vilnius and reorganized as the Infantry School. He also taught military preparedness at Vilnius University.

In fall 1940, along with other Lithuanian officers and resistance activists, he created the so-called "Bulvičius group", which in 1941 evolved into the Vilnius branch of the Lithuanian Activist Front (LAF). The core of Vilnius LAF comprised thirty people with Bulvičius as their leader. The main task of Vilnius LAF was to start an uprising relying on trustworthy personnel from the liquidated Lithuanian Army at the outbreak of the war between the Soviet Union and Nazi Germany. The initial plan was to retreat to the woods of Valkininkai and launch a guerilla war against the Soviet forces. The group acquired a portable radio and cyphers and established contact with Germany in hopes of receiving ammunition and arms. They prepared a map with 77 locations where the Germans could drop the munitions.

During February and March 1941, Bulvičius, together with K. Antanavičius and Juozas Vėbra prepared a plan for the LAF insurrection. According to the agreement between LAF groups in Kaunas and Vilnius, Kaunas group should solve organisational matters of the uprising, and Vilnius group should focus on political and military matters as most of the members of the former Lithuanian Army were stationed in Vilnius and its environs. During a meeting on 22 April, members of Vilnius and Kaunas LAF agreed on the composition of the Lithuanian Provisional Government in which Bulvičius was foreseen as a Minister of Defense.

== Arrest and execution ==
Bulvičius' group was tracked down by detecting their radio sessions. The radio was confiscated on 6 June. Bulvičius was arrested by the NKVD on 9 June. In total, the NKVD arrested a total of 16 people connected with "Bulvičius group". After almost the entire leadership of Vilnius LAF was arrested, the Kaunas LAF took the leading role in the planned uprising. During the June deportation which took place a week after Bulvičius' arrest, 236 Lithuanian officers were arrested. On 22 June, Germany invaded the Soviet Union. The arrests made the June Uprising against the retreating Red Army weaker in Vilnius. Nevertheless, Lithuanian rebels engaged in shootouts with the retreating Red Army and the Germans were able to enter the city without resistance on 24 June.

As Germans were rapidly advancing, the NKVD hurried to evacuate 1,700 political prisoners into the interior of Russia. The prisoners were placed in train wagons at the Vilnius railway station. After a German aviation attack, anti-Soviet insurgents managed to uncouple several wagons thus saving some of the prisoners. At 4am on 24 June, twenty wagons with more than 600 political prisoners, including Bulvičius' group, were deported deep into Russia. On 9 July, Bulvičius was transported to the Prison no. 1 in Gorky (now Nizhny Novgorod). After long torture and interrogation on 26–30 September and trial on 26–28 November 1941, Bulvičius was sentenced to death by the Military Tribunal of the Moscow Military District. Bulvičius was likely executed in the prison and possibly was buried in the nearby Bugrovskoe Cemetery. Seven other members of Vilnius LAF were also executed the same day – Antanas Skripkauskas, Juozas Kilius, Juozas Radzevičius, Leonas Žemkalnis, Jurgis Gobis, Aleksas Kamantauskas and Stasys Mockaitis. Seven others were sentenced to 7 to 20 years in prison, and Aleksas Vainorius was acquitted (however, he was not released and died of tuberculosis in July 1942).

Marija Bulvičienė, wife of Bulvičius, retreated to the U.S. after the war with their two daughters.

== Awards ==
- 1928: Independence Medal
- 16 February 1938: Order of the Lithuanian Grand Duke Gediminas (4th degree)
- 19 November 1997: Grand Cross of Order of the Cross of Vytis (posthumously)

== Legacy ==
On 20 June 2009, a bas-relief by sculptor Stasys Žirgulis of the leaders of the June Uprising was unveiled in the building of the Vytautas Magnus University. The relief honors six professors and students of the university who were the most active leaders of the Lithuanian Activist Front – Vytautas Bulvičius, Adolfas Damušis, Juozas Vėbra, Leonas Prapuolenis, Pilypas Narutis, and Juozas Ambrazevičius.

A training centre of the Lithuanian National Defence Volunteer Forces is named after Major Vytautas Bulvičius.

== See also ==
- June Uprising in Lithuania
