= Juozas Ambrazevičius =

Lithuanian literary historian and politician

Juozas Ambrazevičius-Brazaitis
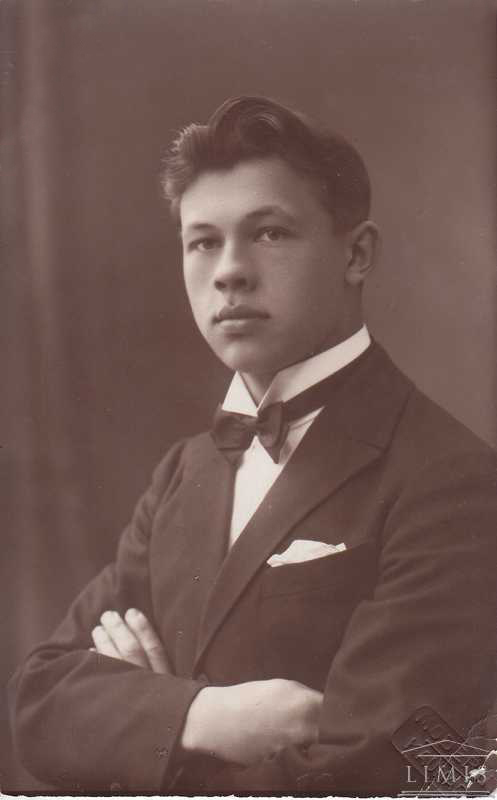
- Ambrazevičius in 1925

Acting Prime Minister of the Provisional Government of Lithuania
- In office 23 June 1941 – 5 August 1941
- Preceded by: Office established
- Succeeded by: Office abolished

Personal details
- Born: Juozas Ambrazevičius; 9 December 1903 Trakiškiai, Suwałki Governorate, Russian Empire
- Died: 28 November 1974 (aged 70) South Orange, New Jersey
- Education: University of Lithuania (1927)

Juozas Ambrazevičius or Juozas Brazaitis (9 December 1903 – 28 November 1974) was a Lithuanian literary historian and politician. Hailing from Catholic groups such as Ateitis and the newspaper XX amžius, he was later a member of both the anti-Soviet Lithuanian Activist Front, the anti-Nazi Lithuanian Front and then the Supreme Committee for the Liberation of Lithuania.

In preparation for the June Uprising in Lithuania of 1941, he was originally intended as the education minister of the Provisional Government of Lithuania. However, as prime minister Kazys Škirpa was held under house arrest by the Gestapo, Ambrazevičius served as the acting prime minister of the Provisional Government for 6 weeks until it was shut down by the Nazi occupation. Ambrazevičius' actions and presence in the Provisional Government generate the most controversy and allegations about Nazi collaboration. Later, the Vytautas the Great University, where he lectured from 1934, was closed in 1943 after a successful Lithuanian boycott of a Waffen-SS unit.

The ideology, views and actions of Ambrazevičius are disputed. The Lithuanian Universal Encyclopedia names Juozas Ambrazevičius as one of the leaders in both Lithuanian anti-Soviet and anti-Nazi resistance movements. In contrast, the Russian Foreign Ministry and some Jewish groups condemned in 2012 the reburial of Brazaitis in Christ's Resurrection Basilica, Kaunas, who they considered a Nazi collaborator and "fascist criminal".

== Interwar: 1922–1940 ==
Ambrazevičius studied literature at the University of Lithuania in Kaunas in 1922–1927 and the University of Bonn in 1931–1932. Starting in 1927, he lectured on Lithuanian literature and folklore in Kaunas. By the end of the 1930s, he was involved in numerous literary and scientific organisations. In 1939, he became a member of the Lithuanian Catholic Academy of Science.

He also worked on the editorial staff of the national daily newspaper Lietuva (Lithuania) and the Catholic daily XX amžius (The 20th Century). He sometimes used the pseudonym "Servus" to write for these newspapers. During World War II, he edited an underground anti-Nazi periodical Į laisvę (Towards Freedom), which he later revived in Germany and the United States.

In 1938–1940, Ambrazevičius was the Chairman of the Ateitininkai Alumni Union.

== Soviet occupation: 1940–1941 ==
As the Soviets occupied Lithuania, Ambrazevičius joined the Lithuanian Activist Front (LAF). The LAF was founded in Berlin by Lithuanian ambassador Kazys Škirpa. Its goal was to rebuild a Lithuania independent of the Soviets under German protection. Their early publications called for the expulsion of Jews from Lithuania and the requisition of their property and blamed them for the country's loss of independence.

== 1941 June Uprising ==
On 22 June 1941, Germany invaded the Soviet Union. On 23 June, the June Uprising in Lithuania began in Kaunas and then spread throughout the country. LAF representative Leonas Prapuolenis broadcast an announcement of the newly independent Lithuanian state and its formation of a provisional government.

Ambrazevičius became acting Prime Minister of the Provisional Government of Lithuania when Kazys Škirpa, originally envisioned for the role, was under house arrest in Berlin.

== German occupation: 1941–1944 ==
=== 1941 June–August ===
After the German entry into Kaunas on June 25, some of the insurgents and TDA members organised and engaged in pogroms against the Jewish population. One of the bloodiest occurred following the German entry into Kaunas, when 3,500–3,800 Jews were killed. When Einsatzgruppen A entered Kaunas, they found numerous insurgent groups, including the journalist Algirdas Klimaitis 's independently operating 600-man militia. Its commander, Franz Walter Stahlecker, explained in a 15 October report that, after meeting little enthusiasm from the Security Police, he used Klimaitis' men rather than his own for the Kaunas pogrom.

It had to be shown to the world that the native population itself took the first action by way of natural reaction against the suppression by Jews during several decades and against the terror exercised by the Communists during the preceding period. (Comprehensive report of Einsatzgruppe A up to 15 October 1941)

Scholars evaluate the role of the Provisional Government in various ways. The historian Algimantas Kasparavičius wrote that "The Provisional Government which was politically selected by the LAF and arose out of the June Uprising with acting prime minister professor Juozas Ambrazevičius at its head, did engage in political collaboration with the Third Reich", citing an antisemitic document passed by the Provisional Government, namely the Regulations on the Status of the Jews of August 1. Vytautas Landsbergis contends that this document might have been a certain negotiation tool with the German occupiers, who had already issued far stricter anti-semitic laws for Jews in Lithuania, and it should be evaluated in the aftermath of a Gestapo-inspired Voldemarininkai coup attempt on July 24 against the Provisional Government. Ambrazevičius himself argued regarding the Regulations of August 1, that it was an attempt by Jurgis Bobelis to get the Provisional Government's approval for a "Jewish Statute", which would be looser compared to the antisemitic regulations of Gebietskommissar Hans Cramer, and that the book Documents Accuse falsely published a project as legislation that actually passed. Lithuanian researchers have pointed out that Documents Accuse was compiled in 1970 by the Chief of Interrogation of the Lithuanian SSR KGB Ovsiej Rozovskij, which raises questions about its reliability.

The LAF was in Kaunas when the Germans arrived, but they were preoccupied with repairing and controlling the radio station, which the Soviets had sabotaged.

Ambrazevičius served as prime minister from 23 June 1941 to 5 August 1941 and also served as Minister of Education. He issued a decree on 29 July 1941, at the request of the German authorities, that expelled Jewish lecturers and Polish and Jewish students from the universities. At Vytautas Magnus University, 31 people were dismissed, mostly Jews, but also Tatars, Russians, and Poles, as well as Lithuanians accused of supporting Soviet rule.

The Germans never intended to rebuild an independent Lithuania, however, nor were the Lithuanians the only people the Germans allowed to believe that they were liberators. On 5 August 1941, the Germans dissolved the provisional government, and on 22 September, they dissolved the LAF. However, the Germans did not abolish the local administration, and transformed the TDA battalions and Lithuanian police into the subordinated Lithuanian Auxiliary Police.

=== Anti-Nazi resistance ===
==== Lithuanian Front: 1942–1943 ====
After the LAF was liquidated, most of its members moved to the underground organisation Lithuanian Front (LF), headed by Juozas Ambrazevičius and Adolfas Damušis. This organisation combined Catholicism with nationalism and considered the Soviet Union's communist ideology its main enemy; Germany was a secondary enemy. The organisation did not intend to engage in armed struggle too early, and placed more emphasis on printing and press distribution. In 1942, it began publishing the Lietuvių fronto biuletenis (lit. 'Lithuanian Front Bulletin'), and in January 1943, Į Laisvę. The goal was to prepare Lithuanian society for a popular anti-Soviet uprising and the restoration of Lithuania within its borders. Ambrazevičius ordered Petras Vilutis in May 1942 to form the Kęstutis military organization. After he left to study in Vienna, Vilutis was replaced by Juozas Jankauskas. Kęstutis aimed to collect weapons and build military structures for a future uprising.

Soviet reports alleged that both the LF and Kęstutis were in close contact with the Germans and the German intelligence service, and cooperated with them in fighting Soviet partisans and activists. The LF's anti-Nazi resistance was passive; its main act of resistance was an extensive propaganda campaign against forming a Lithuanian volunteer Waffen-SS Legion, which the Germans tried and failed to organise in 1943.

==== Supreme Committee for the Liberation of Lithuania: 1943–1944 ====
In the spring of 1942, the LF and the Christian Democrats established the National Council. At the same time, they formed a more pluralistic Lithuanian Supreme Committee. On 25 November 1943, both organisations founded the Supreme Committee for the Liberation of Lithuania (VLIK), with Steponas Kairys as the chairman and Adolfas Damušis, from the LF, as his deputy. Juozas Ambrazevičius became the chairman of the VLIK's political commission. Kęstutis became the core of the Lithuanian armed forces reconstituted by the VLIK. Although VLIK considered itself the sole representative of the Lithuanian state, it remained mainly a consultative committee of numerous organizations that retained autonomy. VLIK tried to establish contacts with the Polish underground, as well as a channel to Western countries through Lithuanian diplomats who remained in neutral countries.

VLIK and the LF still did not undertake armed resistance against the Germans, and supported the establishment of Lithuanian Territorial Defense Force units of Colonel Povilas Plechavičius in cooperation with the Germans, but also documented German crimes and collected intelligence material. In April 1944, the Germans began arresting VLIK members, and in June, Adolfas Damušis was arrested. In July, Ambrazevičius decided to leave Vilnius with the retreating German army and go to Germany.

== Emigration: 1944–1974 ==
In the summer of 1944, Ambrazevičius left for Germany, and from there in 1948, for the United States, where he edited a Catholic daily newspaper named Darbininkas (lit. 'The Worker'), based in New York City, under the name Juozas Brazaitis. He also continued working on the Supreme Committee for the Liberation of Lithuania from exile and published a number of leaflets illustrating German and Soviet crimes in Lithuania and the Lithuanian resistance, for example, In the Name of the Lithuanian People (1946) and Appeal to the United Nations on Genocide (1951). In 1964, he published a book titled Vienų vieni (lit. 'All Alone') about the Lithuanian June Uprising.

The Kremlin actively opposed his activities. In the 1970s, he became a subject of interest for the Soviet media and American hunters of Nazi collaborators, who accused him of having worked for the Third Reich. In reply, he published an extensive dossier of his World War II activities.

== Works ==
His major works include

- Theory of Literature (Literatūros teorija in 1930)
- two-volume A History of World Literature (Visoutinė literatūros istorija in 1931-1932)
- Vaižgantas (in 1936)
- three-volume New Readings (Naujieji skaitymai)
- Lithuanian Writers (Lietuvių rašytojai in 1938)

== Remembrance ==
In 2009, Ambrazevičius was posthumously awarded Lithuania's highest honour, the Grand Cross of the Order of Vytautas the Great.

Controversy arose over the ceremonial reburial with state honors of the remains of Juozas Ambrazevičius in May 2012. Ambrazevičius' remains were transported back from the United States to Lithuania, met by an honour guard at Kaunas airport and reburied at Christ's Resurrection Church in Kaunas. At the reburial ceremony in Kaunas, adviser to Lithuanian prime minister Andrius Kubilius said that a 1975 investigation by US Immigration had found no evidence of Brazaitis being involved in anti-Semitic or pro-Nazi activities. However, Ambrazevicius signed an order to set up a concentration camp and establish a ghetto in Kaunas for the city's Jews. The Kaunas mayor said: 'It seems strange to me that while there is no official proof, they are trying to identify the honourable Ambrazevičius-Brazaitis with pro-Nazi activity'.

Simonas Alperavičius, leader of Lithuania's Jewish community, protested the glorification of a person he said had persecuted Lithuania's Jews. More than 40 of Lithuania's leading intellectuals, including many historians, protested the official honoring of Juozas Ambrazevičius-Brazaitis. A subsequent clarification issued in 2019 by the US Senate Foreign Affairs Committee said that the investigation had not been conclusive and did not amount to a "rehabilitation" of Ambrazevičius/Brazaitis. The investigation into his wartime activities ended after he died in 1974.

== Personal life ==
On 16 February 1942, he married Vlada Prosčiūnaitė-Matulaitienė. A year later, they had a daughter.

== Sources ==
- Buchaveckas, Stanislovas (2018). "Juozas Brazaitis". Visuotinė lietuvių enciklopedija (in Lithuanian).

== See also ==
- Sužiedelis, Saulius (2006). "Lithuanian Collaboration during the Second World War: Past Realities, Present Perceptions: Collaboration and Resistance during the Holocaust: Belarus, Estonia, Latvia, Lithuania". The Mass Persecution and Murder of Jews: The Summer and Fall of. Vol. 158.2004. pp. 313–359. "This presentation is in part a modified summary and collation of my studies presented in earlier venues:
  My reports
  Foreign Saviors, Native Disciples: Perspectives on Collaboration in Lithuania, 1940–1945, presented in April 2002 at the "Reichskommissariat Ostland" conference at Uppsala University and Södertörn University College, now published in: Collaboration and Resistance during the Holocaust. Belarus, Estonia, Latvia, Lithuania, ed. David Gaunt et al
  My articles in Vilnius at the conference Holocaust in Lithuania in Vilnius 2002: The Burden of 1941, in: 'Lituanus' 47:4 (2001), pp. 47-60;
  Thoughts on Lithuania's Shadows of the Past: A Historical Essay on the Legacy of War, Part I, in: 'Vilnius (Summer 1998), pp. 129-146;
  Thoughts on Lithuania's Shadows of the Past: A Historical Essay on the Legacy of War, Part II, in: 'Vilnius' (Summer 1999), pp. 177-208..."
- Piotrowski, Tadeusz (2007). Poland's Holocaust: Ethnic Strife, Collaboration with Occupying Forces and Genocide in the Second Republic, 1918-1947 (illustrated ed.). McFarland. ISBN 978-0786429134. ** despite the title, this source contains several substantive mentions of Lithuania's circumstances. While Lithuania is not its primary topic, the histories of the two countries are closely interrelated and the mentions are well beyond passing references; several are three or more pages long
- Full text available online
  - Dov Levin (2000). The Litvaks: A Short History of the Jews in Lithuania - Berghahn Series (illustrated ed.). Berghahn Books. p. 283. doi:10.1163/9789401208895_005. ISBN 9653080849.
- Gruodyte, Edita; Adomaityte, Aurelija. "The Tragedy of the Holocaust in Lithuania: From the Roots of the Identity to the Efforts towards Reconciliation" (PDF). repozytorium.uni.pl.
- Sužiedelis, Saulius (7 July 2011). "341. The Perception of the Holocaust: Public Challenges and Experience in Lithuania". Wilson Center.
- June 1999 United States Justice Department
- Malinauskaite. "Holocaust Memory and Antisemitism in Lithuania: Reversed Memories of the Second World War" (PDF). Archived from the original (PDF) on 28 January 2024.
- Malinauskaitė, Gintarė (2019). Mediated Memories: Narratives and Iconographies of the Holocaust in Lithuania (PDF). Marburg: Verlag Herder-Institut.
- Sužiedėlis, Saulius (2006). "Lithuanian Collaboration during the Second World War: Past Realities, Present Perceptions" (PDF). In Tauber, Joachim (ed.). "Kollaboration" in Nordosteuropa: Erscheinungsformen und Deutungen im 20. Jahrhundert. Wiesbaden: Harrassowitz Verlag.
- Sužiedėlis, Simas, ed. (1970–1978). "Juozas Brazaitis". Encyclopedia Lituanica. Vol. I. Boston, Massachusetts: Juozas Kapočius. pp. 396–397. LCCN 74-114275.
- Wnuk, Rafał (2018). Leśni bracia. Podziemie antykomunistyczne na Litwie, Łotwie i w Estonii 1944-1956 [Forest Brothers. Anti-communist underground in Lithuania, Latvia and Estonia 1944-1956] (in Polish). Lublin: Instytut Europy Środkowo-Wschodniej. ISBN 978-83-60695-90-6.
- Woolfson, Shivaun (2014). Holocaust Legacy in Post-Soviet Lithuania. People, Places and Objects. Bloomsbury Academic. ISBN 9781472522955.
- Vareikis, Vygantas (2009). "In the Shadow of the Holocaust: Lithuanian-Jewish Relations in the Crucial Years 1940-1944". In Bankier, David; Gutman, Israel (eds.). Nazi Europe and the Final Solution. Yad Vashem. ISBN 978-1-84545-410-4.
- Veilentienė, Audronė (2016). "Vytauto Didžiojo universitetas nacių okupacijos metais ir antinacinė rezistencija" [Vytautas Magnus University during the Nazi Occupation and Anti-Nazi Resistance]. Kauno istorijos metraštis. 16: 195–217. doi:10.7220/2335-8734.16.8.

Preceded by Antanas Merkys	Prime Minister of Lithuania; 23 June 1941 – 5 August 1941	Succeeded by Kazimira Prunskienė
