= Lithuanian resistance =

Lithuanian resistance may refer to:

- Resistance in Lithuania during World War II
- Lithuanian partisans, resistance against Soviet regime during and after World War II
