= Independence of Lithuania =

Independence of Lithuania or Lithuanian independence may refer to:

- Lithuanian independence movement
- The Act of Independence of Lithuania of February 16, 1918
- Lithuanian Wars of Independence, 1918-1920
- June Uprising in Lithuania
  - Proclamation of the Provisional Government of Lithuania of June 23, 1941
- The Act of the Re-Establishment of the State of Lithuania of March 11, 1990
