= Į laisvę =

Į laisvę (transl. Towards Freedom) was the name of these Lithuanian periodicals:

- Į laisvę (daily) (1941–1942) published daily in Kaunas
- Į laisvę (34 issues in 1943–1944) published irregularly by the Lithuanian Front, an anti-Nazi resistance organization
- Į laisvę (3 issues in 1948) published as a bulletin at a displaced person camp in Pfullingen
- Į laisvę (1953–2008) published as a quarterly magazine in the United States and later Lithuania
