= Juozas Vėbra =

Lithuanian military person

Colonel Juozas Vėbra
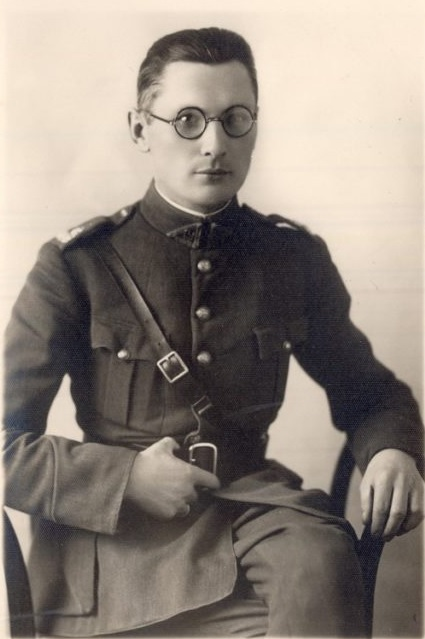
- Vėbra photographed with uniform of the Lithuanian Army
- Born: April 20, 1901; Gentyniai, Jūžintai County, Rokiškis District, Russian Empire
- Died: February 9, 1994 (aged 92); Durham, Connecticut, United States
- Burial place: Vilnius, Lithuania (reburied)
- Alma mater: Fontainebleau Artillery Military School (1921–1923), War School of Kaunas (1923), University of Lithuania (1923–1925), University of Toulouse (1928)
- Military career
- Allegiance: Lithuanian Armed Forces (1919–1940); Lithuanian Activist Front (1941)
- Service years: 1919–1941
- Rank: Colonel
- Awards: Medal of Independence of Lithuania (1928); Commander's Cross of the Order of the Lithuanian Grand Duke Gediminas (1932); Commander's Cross of the Order of Vytautas the Great (1938); Commander's Cross of the Order of the Cross of Vytis (2001)

Juozas Vėbra (April 20, 1901 – February 9, 1994) was a Lithuanian military person, since 1930 Doctor of Chemistry.

== Interwar Lithuania ==
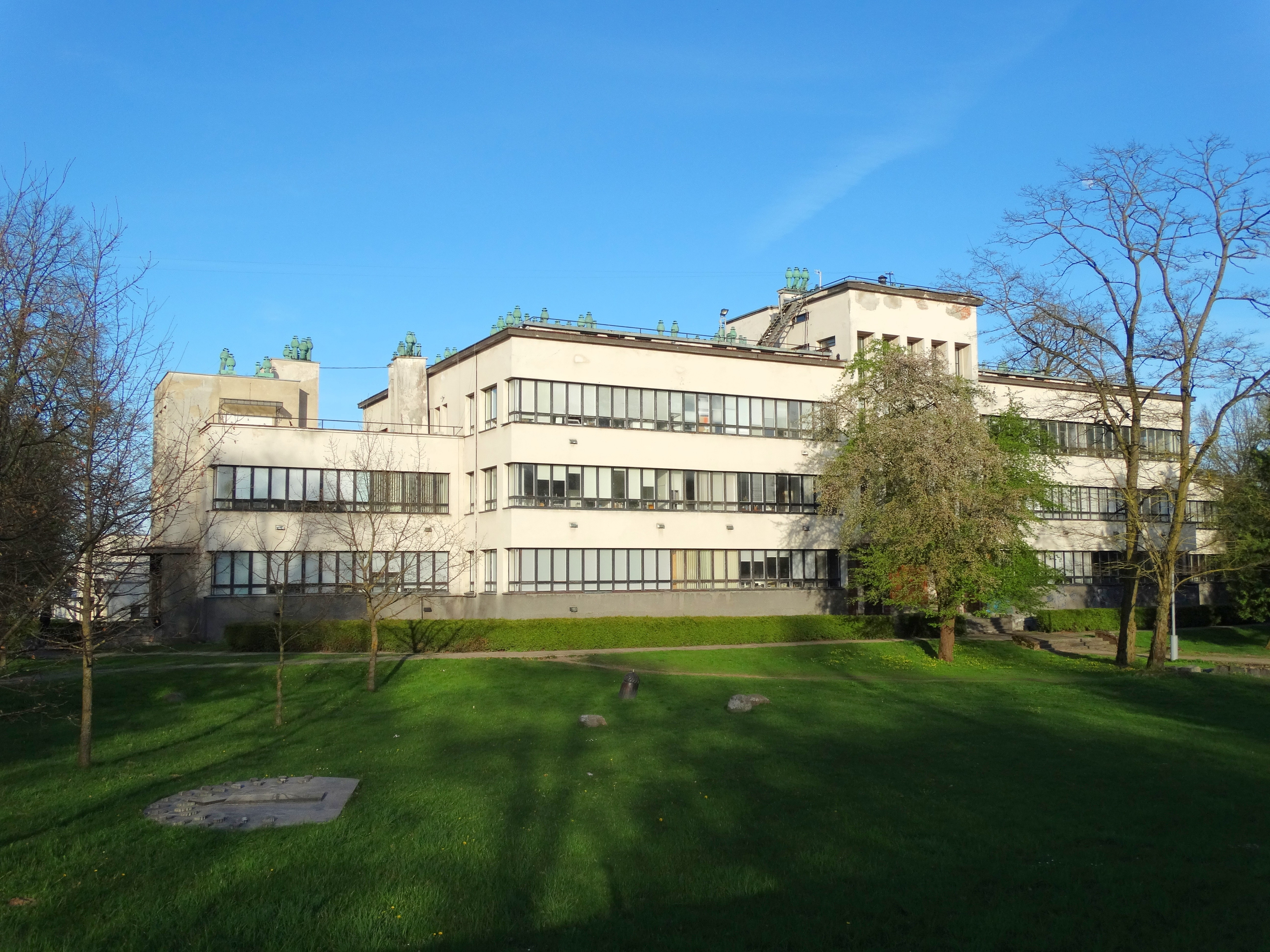
Laboratory, the construction of which was supervised by Vėbra

In 1919 Vėbra joined the Lithuanian Armed Forces as a volunteer and participated in the Lithuanian Wars of Independence with Soviet Russia and from 21 September 1920 to 1 October 1920 with the Polish Armed Forces. From 1921 to 1923 he studied at the Fontainebleau Artillery Military School. In 1923 he graduated from the Higher Course of Officers at War School of Kaunas. In 1928 he graduated from the University of Toulouse. In 1930–32 he worked in the Ministry of National Defense of Lithuania, in 1938–40 in the Armament Board.

He was the initiator of the development of the Research Laboratory of the Armament Board of the Ministry of National Defense of Lithuania in Kaunas and by gathering experience he visited as many as eight latest laboratories of similar purposes in Germany, Belgium, France, Switzerland, and Spain, however in the end all the equipment of the Research Laboratory was invented and designed by the scientific staff of the Armament Board. Since 1938 he was the Head of the Research Laboratory of the Armament Board of the Ministry of National Defense of Lithuania.

== Occupations and World War II ==
Following the Soviet occupation of Lithuania in 1940, Vėbra was the Head of the Department of Organic Technology of the Vytautas Magnus University in 1940–43. In order to preserve the Research Laboratory, Vėbra together with Pranas Lesauskis proposed to connect it to the university. This preserved the unique laboratory, most of its staff in 1941 avoided political repressions and started working at the Faculty of Technology of Kaunas University, which was established in the Research Laboratory (now – Faculty of Chemical Technology of Kaunas University of Technology).

In 1941 Vėbra participated in the June Uprising in Lithuania (was one of its organizers and leaders) and preparation of the Act of Declaration of Independence of Lithuania.

During the German Nazis occupation of Lithuania he became involved in the anti-Nazi resistance. On 13 June 1944 he was arrested by Gestapo and sentenced to death, however by accident the cases of the prisoners disappeared during the bombings twice. He was imprisoned in various German prisons, but was freed by the Allies of World War II in 1945.

== Emigration ==
Vėbra lived in Paris from 1946 to 1949 and in the United States from 1949 onward. He has worked in various companies as an explosives researcher.

From 1976 to 1977 he was chairman of the Supreme Committee for the Liberation of Lithuania.

Following the restoration of Lithuania's independence, he visited Lithuania and the laboratory where he previously worked in 1991 and 1993.

== Legacy ==
Vėbra wrote and published five books: Chemijos pagrindai: įvadas į neorganinės chemijos pradžią (1932), Bendroji chemija (1934), Polichloro dimetilsulfidai ir jų homologai (1937), Organinė technologija (1940–43), Natūralūs ir sintetiniai tanidai (1944) and contributed to the Lithuanian Encyclopedia. Moreover, he published 18 scientific articles, made 13 inventions.

On April 28, 2001, commemorating the centenary of his birth, a memorial plaque with a bas-relief: "Juozas Vėbra / 1901–1994 / Volunteer of the Independence Fights, Colonel, Engineer, Doctor of Chemistry, Head of the Research Laboratory" (sculptor Stasys Žirgulis) was unveiled in the building (formerly the Research Laboratory) of the Faculty of Chemical Technology of the Kaunas University of Technology.

On 20 June 2009 bas-reliefs and a memorial plaque of six Lithuanian Activist Front executives were unveiled in the lobby of the Vytautas Magnus University (K. Donelaičio Str. 52).
