= Pranas Lesauskis =

Lithuanian military person, management specialist and mathematician

Colonel Pranas Lesauskis
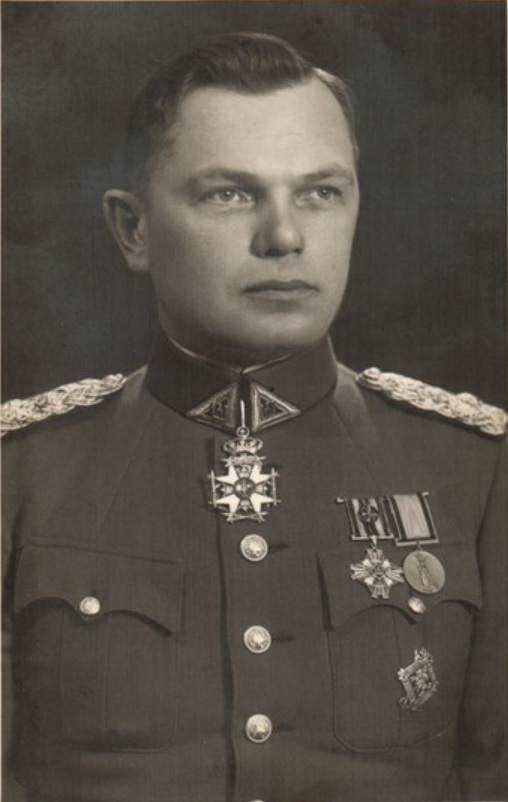
- Lesauskis photographed with uniform of the Lithuanian Army and state awards
- Born: November 17, 1900; Žeberiai, Tverai County, Telšiai District, Russian Empire
- Died: November 27, 1942 (aged 42); Suchobezvodnoj, Gorky Oblast, Russian SFSR
- Alma mater: War School of Kaunas (1921), University of Lithuania (1927), Turin Higher School of Artillery Technology (1927–1930); Royal University of Rome (1931)
- Military career
- Allegiance: Lithuanian Armed Forces (1920–1940)
- Service years: 1920–1940
- Rank: Colonel
- Awards: Medal of Independence of Lithuania (1928); Officer's Cross of the Order of the Lithuanian Grand Duke Gediminas
- Other work: Professor of the Vytautas Magnus University

Pranas Lesauskis (November 17, 1900 – November 27, 1942) was a Lithuanian military person, management specialist, mathematician. In 1931 he defended his dissertation at the Royal University of Rome and became Doctor of Mathematics.

== Biography ==
Lesauskis was born on November 17, 1900, in Žeberiai, Tverai County, Telšiai District, Russian Empire. In 1920 he joined the Lithuanian Armed Forces as a volunteer. In 1921 he graduated the War School of Kaunas, in 1927 University of Lithuania, in 1927-1930 he studied at Turin Higher School of Artillery Technology (1927–1930), and in 1931 he defended his PhD thesis at Royal University of Rome. His PhD thesis about the projectile derivation theory was awarded 105 points out of 110 possible, and according to his dissertation this theory was taught at the Turin Higher School of Artillery Technology since 1931. While studying higher artillery education in Italy, he was able to find time to study general sciences in parallel with military science, choosing branches of mathematics that were more suited to military matters. Among other sciences, Lesauskis studied various foreign languages and was able to write and speak in Italian, English, French, German, Russian, and other languages (totally, he knew 30 languages).

Lesauskis worked actively in the fields of ballistics, mathematics, management, and military pedagogy. He has written 3 books and 3 articles on ballistics. Several articles by Lesauskis on this topic have appeared in Italian and French magazines, which testifies to the exceptionally high level. He has also published high level management articles. For his activity, he was awarded a number of Lithuanian, Swedish, and Finnish state orders.

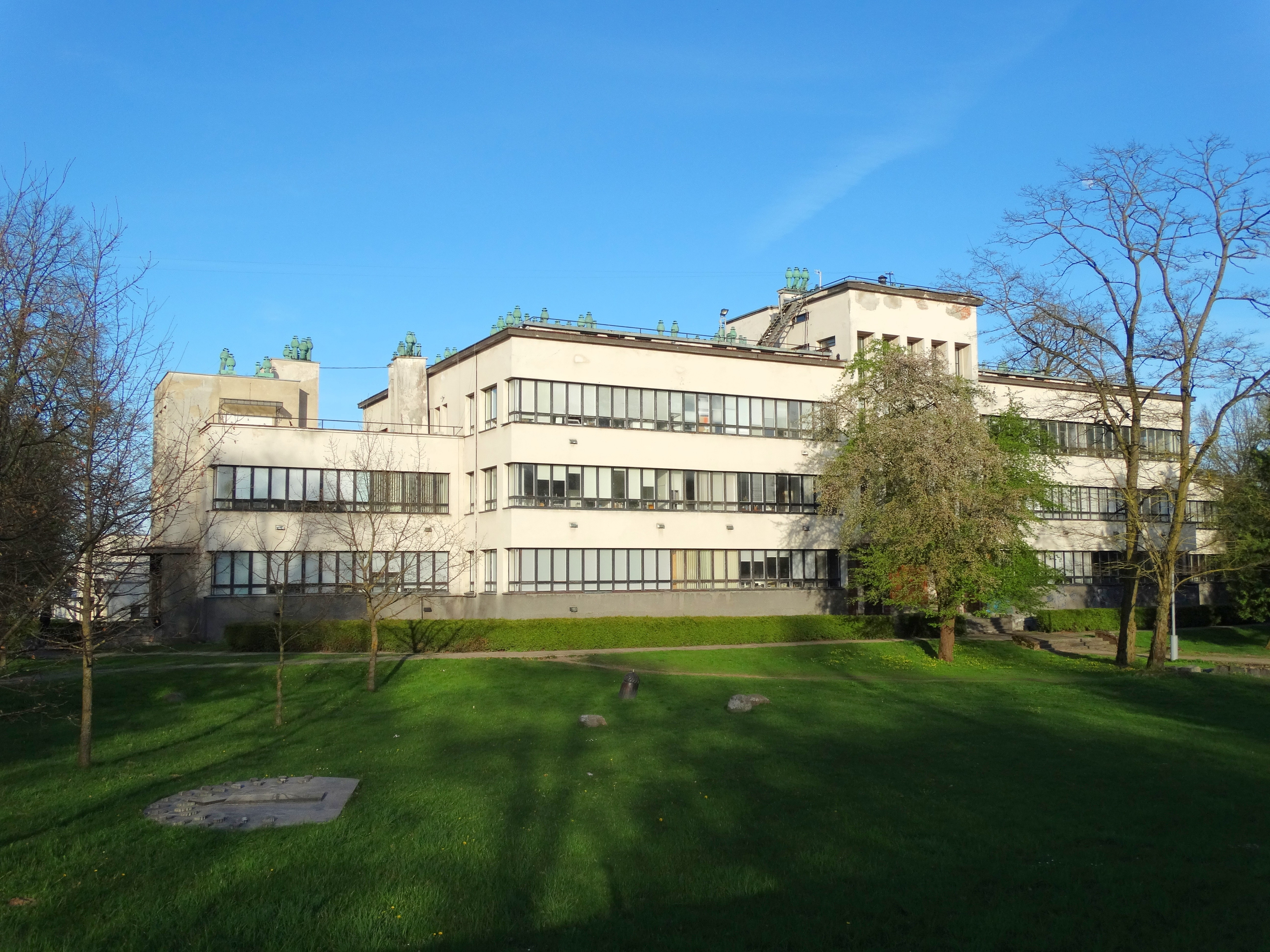
Laboratory, the construction of which was organized by Lesauskis

In 1936–1940, Lesauskis was the Head of the Armament Board of the Ministry of National Defense of Lithuania. As head of the Armaments Board, he organized the rearmament of artillery parts, the construction of a modern Research Laboratory of the Armament Board of the Ministry of National Defense of Lithuania and Linkaičiai workshop. Lesauskis took an active part in public life – he was elected a member of the Construction Commission of the Kaunas Garrison Officers' Club Building, the College of the Military Museum and the Editorial Board of the military science magazine Mūsų žinynas. Moreover, he also was a member of the Lithuanian Society of Naturalists and Economic Studies, chairman of the Society for Scientific Management, and participated in the activities of the Naujoji Romuva Intellectuals' Club, where he multiple times lectured reports and published articles on management in the journal Naujoji Romuva.

Following the Soviet occupation of Lithuania in 1940 which resulted in the abolition of the Lithuanian Armed Forces and its institutions in the same year, he began lecturing at the Vytautas Magnus University. In order to preserve the Research Laboratory, Lesauskis together with Juozas Vėbra proposed to connect it to the university. This preserved the unique laboratory, most of its staff in 1941 avoided political repressions and started working at the Faculty of Technology of Kaunas University, which was established in the Research Laboratory (now – Faculty of Chemical Technology of Kaunas University of Technology).

In 1940 Lesauskis was invited to lecture at the Leningrad Military Academy, but chose the Vytautas Magnus University Faculty of Technology. On January 4, 1941, Lesauskis was recognized as a professor. Nevertheless, on the night of January 2, 1940, Lesauskis was arrested by the NKVD, sentenced to 8 years for deliberate damage to the sale of weapons to the Spanish Republic, and imprisoned in a Gulag, where he died due to exhaustion from famine. On April 28, 1958, he was posthumously rehabilitated by the Military Collegium of the Supreme Court of the Soviet Union.
