= Lithuanian Front =

Lithuanian political resistance organization

The Lithuanian Front (Lithuanian: Lietuvių frontas; abbreviated LF) was an underground anti-Nazi and anti-Soviet Lithuanian resistance organisation active from September 1941, led by Juozas Ambrazevičius. It was one of the main anti-Nazi resistance movements in Lithuania, alongside the Lithuanian Freedom Fighters' Union (LLKS). Ambrazevičius was the most important and influential leader of the national Lithuanian resistance to Nazi German occupation.

The LF engaged in nonviolent resistance to Nazi Germany's occupation of Lithuania by sabotaging German exploitation of forced labour, suppression of Lithuanian education and the creation of a Lithuanian Waffen-SS Legion. For example, the LF issued an edict on 10 October 1941 against the registration of Lithuanian men by the occupying German administration. The Lithuanian resistance avoided combat because it wanted to avoid helping the Soviet Union, to re-occupy it. The resistance wanted Germany to be defeated by the Western Allies. Regardless, the resistance prepared for military resistance in case it was necessary.

The goals of the LF were to preserve the population of Lithuania and strengthen the country's unity, cultural institutions, enterprises, and farms. Its slogan was "Lithuanian for Lithuanian" (lietuvis už lietuvį), emphasizing Lithuanian unity in the face of the foreign occupations of Lithuania. Because the organisation was illegal, paperwork was avoided and most of its functions mainly carried out by verbal agreements.

== Background ==
The predecessor of the Lithuanian Front and organizer of the anti-Soviet June Uprising, the LAF, was banned on 26 September 1941 by the order of Theodor Adrian von Renteln, the General Commissioner of German-occupied Lithuania. This suppression of the LAF meant that there was no longer any legal cover for nationalist activity. On September 20, Leonas Prapuolenis delivered a memorandum to the German military headquarters in Kaunas against the German occupation of Lithuania. The memorandum was signed by 30 of the most important members of the LAF and the Provisional Government of Lithuania. The next day, on September 21, Gestapo arrested Prapuolenis and seized the premises of the LAF headquarters in Kaunas. On September 22, they banned the whole LAF and confiscated all of its properties. Leonas Prapuolenis was deported to Dachau.

After the LAF was banned, there were practically no more organizations left in Lithuania that could defend Lithuanian interests and oppose the occupiers. Another organisation like the LAF, which united political groups across the political spectrum, was impossible because of the deep divisions between the former parties. Many former LAF members, mostly from its Catholic wing, regrouped as the Lithuanian Front and began underground anti-Nazi activities. So, the LF in some ways was the organizational and ideological successor to the LAF.

LF was mainly composed of activists from the Lithuanian Christian Democratic Party and Catholic youth organisations such as Ateitis.

== Organization ==
The LF was led by a central board and had five districts across Lithuania. The most important organizers and leaders of the Lithuanian Front were Juozas Ambrazevičius and his right-hand man Adolfas Damušis, who were the acting prime minister and government minister, respectively, of the former Lithuanian Provisional Government, as well as former LAF members such as Zenonas Ivinskis, Antanas Maceina and professors Pranas Padalis and Vladas Viliamas, in addition to other prominent cultural and political figures. All of them taught at the Vytautas Magnus University in Kaunas or the Vilnius University during the Nazi occupation. All higher education institutions in Lithuania, including both universities, were closed on 17 March 1943 and 46 Lithuanian intellectuals deported to Stutthof concentration camp as a result of Nazi repressions in the aftermath of the successful Lithuanian resistance to the creation of a Lithuanian Waffen-SS Legion.

There was no strict centralization and the organization mostly functioned through its district committees.

Districts of the LF
District	Head
Vilnius	Vladas Nagevičius
Kaunas	Juozas Ambrazevičius
Šiauliai	Adolfas Raulinaitis
Marijampolė	Vincas Seliokas
Panevėžys	Matas Martinaitis

=== Branches ===
The LF was divided into 3 branches: military, political and financial. The military section accumulated weapons and organized armed units. On May 5, 1942, the LF founded Kęstutis, a military political organisation that was subordinated to it. Many of Kęstutis' members became anti-Soviet Lithuanian partisans. The Political and Information Department formulated the organization's political programme and published and distributed illegal anti-Nazi press, while the Financial Department raised funds for the press and other matters.

== Press ==
From 1943 onwards, the LF published the illegal newspaper Į laisvę (To Freedom) (editor Antanas Strabulis), and the political weekly Lietuvių fronto biuletenis (Lithuanian Front Bulletin), with the latter being was meant for the organisation's members. Sometimes the print circulation of Į laisvę reached as many as 10,000. Affiliates of the LF also published the newspapers Vardan tiesos and Pogrindžio kuntaplis, which was more satirical.

On 25 November 1943, the Lithuanian Front, together with other organisations, founded the Supreme Committee for the Liberation of Lithuania. The LF played an important role in centralizing the Lithuanian anti-Nazi resistance into that Committee. The Lithuanian Front was represented by Adolfas Damušis (vice-chairman of the presidium until when he was arrested by the Gestapo in June 1944, whereupon he was replaced by Povilas Šilas). The chairman of the committee's political commission was Juozas Ambrazevičius, while the chairman of the commission for the determination of the borders of Lithuania was Zenonas Ivinskis. In April 1944, the LF contributed to the creation of the Lithuanian Territorial Defense Force.

== Second Soviet occupation ==
According to the Lithuanian historian Dalia Kuodytė, few members of either the LF or LLKS remained in Lithuania when the Soviet Union re-occupied it in 1944, because all of them had already been deported to Nazi concentration camps or emigrated westwards. The Lithuanian Front continued to operate in the Lithuanian diaspora throughout the Cold War.

Many of the members of LF remaining in Lithuania were arrested by the Soviets, but some managed to become anti-Soviet partisans.

== Sources ==
- Bubnys, Arūnas (Autumn 1991). "Lietuvių antinacinė rezistencija" (PDF). Į Laisvę (in Lithuanian). 112 (149).
- Bubnys, Arūnas (2005). "Juozas Brazaitis ir antinacinis pasipriešinimas" [Juozas Brazaitis and anti-Nazi resistance] (PDF). Lietuvių Katalikų Mokslo Akademijos Metraštis (in Lithuanian). 26.
- Bubnys, Arūnas (2018). "Lietuvių frontas". Visuotinė lietuvių enciklopedija (in Lithuanian).
- Kuodytė, Dalia (1997). "Lietuvos rezistencijos ryšiai su Vakarais". Genocidas ir Rezistencija (in Lithuanian). 2.
- Sužiedėlis, Saulius (2011). "Resistance movements" (PDF). Historical Dictionary of Lithuania. Scarecrow Press.
- Jegelevičius, Sigitas (2004). "Parlamentarizmo idėja antinacinio pasipriešinimo kontekste". Parliamentary Studies (in Lithuanian). 1. doi:10.51740/ps.vi1.408.
