= Resistance in Lithuania during World War II =

Eastern Front, June 1941-December 1941

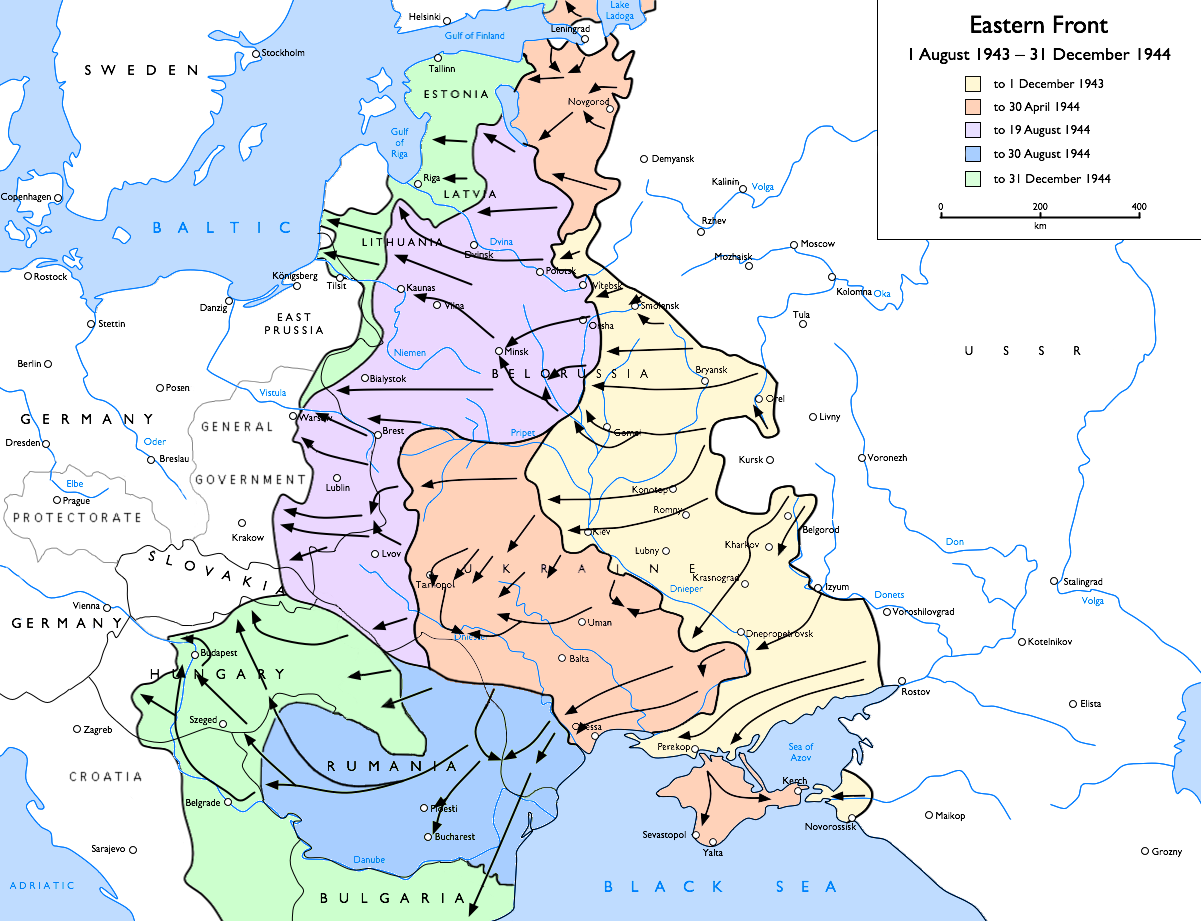
Eastern Front, August 1943-December 1944

During World War II, Lithuania was occupied twice by the Soviet Union (1940–1941; post-1944) and once by Nazi Germany (1941–1944). Resistance took many forms.

During the occupations, there arose parallel resistance movements in Lithuania that had competing goals due to the different priorities of the several ethnicities, besides the fringe Soviet collaborators whose fate was tied to the Soviet Union and were more united by ideology than ethnicity. Thus, the anti-Nazi resistance in Lithuania was fractured into:

- the Lithuanian anti-Nazi resistance (the Lithuanian Front, the Lithuanian Liberty Army, the Union of Lithuanian Freedom Fighters and more),
- the Jewish partisans,
- the Polish Home Army,
- and the Soviet partisans.

Notably, although the latter two resistance movements fought against Nazi occupation, they also fought for Lithuania's occupation by their respective countries. Many Polish resistance members were against the possibility of an independent Lithuania after the war's end.

== First Soviet occupation ==
In 1940, President Antanas Smetona fled to Germany, not wanting his government to become a puppet of the Soviet occupation. Soviet attempts to capture him were unsuccessful, and he was able to settle in the United States.

In 1940, Jan Zwartendijk, the Dutch consul in Kaunas, and Chiune Sugihara, the Japanese consul in Kaunas, and his wife Yukiko disobeyed orders and saved thousands of Jewish refugees from Poland by granting them visas.

In 1941, the Lithuanian Activist Front (Lithuanian: Lietuvos Aktyvistų Frontas) formed an underground government, and following the June uprising, the Provisional Government of Lithuania maintained sovereignty for a brief period.

== German occupation ==
Soviet partisans began sabotage and guerrilla operations against German forces immediately after the Nazi invasion of 1941. The activities of Soviet partisans in Lithuania were partly coordinated by the Command of the Lithuanian Partisan Movement headed by Antanas Sniečkus and partly by the Central Command of the Partisan Movement of the USSR.

In 1943, the Nazis attempted to raise a Waffen-SS division from the local population as they had in many other countries, but due to widespread coordination between resistance groups, the mobilization was boycotted. The Lithuanian Territorial Defense Force (Lietuvos vietinė rinktinė) was eventually formed in 1944 under Lithuanian command, but was liquidated by the Nazis only a few months later for refusing to subordinate to their command.

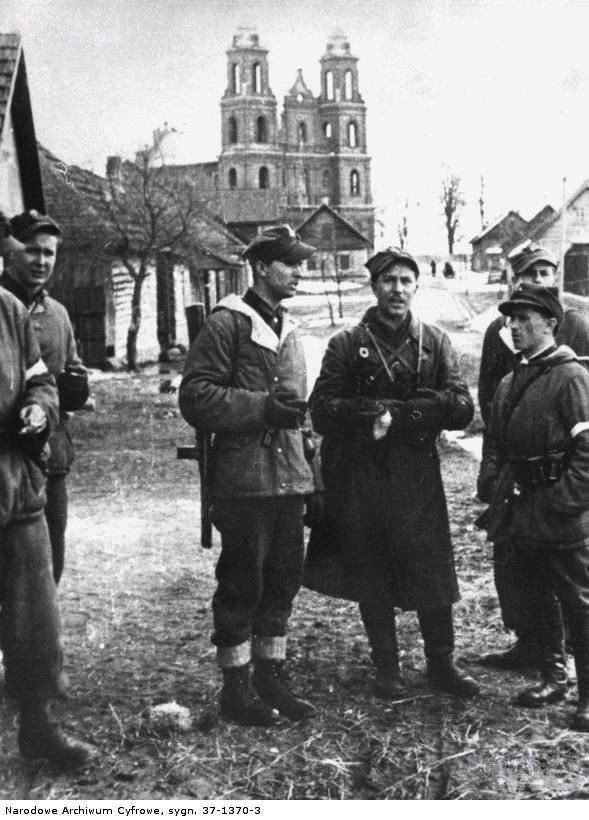
Home Army soldiers in Turgeliai, 1944

There was no significant violent resistance directed against the Nazis. Some Lithuanians, encouraged by Germany's vague promises of autonomy, cooperated with the Nazis. Pre-war tensions over the Vilnius Region resulted in a low-level civil war between Poles and Lithuanians. Nazi-sponsored Lithuanian units, primarily the Lithuanian Security Police, were active in the region and assisted the Germans in repressing the Polish population. In the autumn of 1943, the Home Army began retaliatory operations against the Lithuanian units and killed hundreds of mostly Lithuanian Auxiliary policemen and other collaborators during the first half of 1944. The conflict culminated in the massacres of Polish and Lithuanian civilians in June 1944 in the Glitiškės (Glinciszki) and Dubingiai (Dubinki) villages.

Also in 1943, several underground political groups united under the Supreme Committee for the Liberation of Lithuania (Vyriausias Lietuvos išlaisvinimo komitetas, or VLIK). The committee issued a declaration of independence that went largely unnoticed. It became active mostly outside Lithuania among emigrants and deportees, and was able to establish contacts in Western countries and get support for resistance operations inside Lithuania (see Operation Jungle). It would persist abroad for many years as one of the groups representing Lithuania in exile.

The Lithuanian Liberty Army, during Nazi Germany's occupation, opposed German policies, but did not begin armed resistance. The armed struggle began in mid-1944 when the Red Army reached the Lithuanian borders after the Minsk Offensive. The LLA became the first wave of the Lithuanian partisans, armed anti-Soviet guerrilla fighters. It attempted to become the central command of the armed struggle. However, the organization headquarters was liquidated by the Soviet security forces (NKVD and KGB) by April 1946. Many Lithuanian Liberty Army fighters joined the wider movement of Lithuanian partisans.

Jewish partisans also fought against the Nazi occupation. In September 1943, the United Partisan Organization, led by Abba Kovner, attempted to start an uprising in the Vilna Ghetto, and later engaged in sabotage and guerrilla operations against the Nazi occupation.

In July 1944, as part of its Operation Tempest, the Polish Home Army launched Operation Ostra Brama, an attempt to recapture that city.

As of January 2008, 723 Lithuanians were recognized by Israel as Righteous among the Nations for their efforts in saving Lithuania's Jews from the Holocaust. The total number of people who helped the Jews is most definitely underestimated.

== Second Soviet occupation ==
Lithuanian partisans, known as the Forest Brothers, began guerrilla warfare against the Soviet forces as soon as the front passed over them in 1944, and continued an armed struggle until 1953. The core of this movement was made up of soldiers from the Territorial Defense Force, who had disbanded with their weapons and uniforms, and members of the Lithuanian Liberty Army, established in 1941. The underground had extensive clandestine radio and press. Thousands of people engaged in active and passive resistance against the Soviet authorities. The various resistance organizations eventually united under the Movement of the Struggle for the Freedom of Lithuania (Lietuvos Laisvės Kovų Sąjūdis, or LLKS), issuing a declaration of independence in 1949 that would ultimately be signed into law by the independent Republic of Lithuania in 1999. The most famous of these partisans is probably Juozas Lukša, author of several books during the resistance and the subject of the 2004 film Utterly Alone.

While armed resistance ended in the 1950s, nonviolent resistance continued in various forms (e.g. through Lithuanians living abroad, the Catholic press, safeguarding local traditions and the Lithuanian language, the Sąjūdis movement, etc.), until 1991, when Russia recognized the independence declared by Lithuania on March 11, 1990.

== Significance of February 16 ==
February 16, the date that Lithuania first declared its independence in 1918, played an important symbolic role during this period. The call for volunteers for the Lithuanian Territorial Defense Force, the VLIK declaration of independence, and the LLKS declaration of independence were all made on February 16. This day has become a national holiday in Lithuania.

== See also ==
- Occupation of the Baltic states
- Guerrilla war in the Baltic states
- Occupation of Estonia by Nazi Germany
- Estonian anti-German resistance movement 1941–1944
- Occupation of Latvia by Nazi Germany
- Soviet occupation of Latvia in 1940
- Latvian resistance movement
- Occupation of Belarus by Nazi Germany
- Belarusian resistance movement
- History of Poland (1939–1945)
- Polish resistance movement in World War II
- Collaboration during World War II
- Molotov–Ribbentrop Pact
