= Trakiškiai =

Trakiškiai may refer to the following villages in Lithuania:

- Trakiškiai (Kalvarija), a village in Kalvarija Municipality
- Trakiškiai (Marijampolė), a village in Marijampolė Municipality
- Trakiškiai (Panevėžys), a village in Panevėžys District Municipality
- Trakiškiai (Raseiniai), a village in Raseiniai District Municipality
- Trakiškiai (Varėna), a village in Varėna District Municipality
