= Liūtas Mockūnas =

Liūtas Mockūnas (September 30, 1934 – February 13, 2007) was a Lithuanian-American journalist, editor, writer, cultural critic, and engineer and notable Lithuanian World Community activist.

Born in Lithuania, he moved with his parents to West Germany during World War II, and to the United States in 1949. After graduating from Philadelphia's Drexel University, he worked as a transport specialist. Living in Chicago, he became involved with the Lithuanian-American organization Santara-Šviesa, and served as an editor for its periodicals.

Mockūnas compiled and edited several books that discussed an array of cultural topics: Žodžiai ir prasmė (Words and Meaning, 1982), A. Škėmos Raštai (The Works of A. Škėma, 1985), and Pavargęs herojus (Tired Hero, 1997), which discussed the Lithuanian resistance against the Soviet Union in the aftermath of World War II, Laisvės horizontai (Horizonts of freedom) 2001 together with Aleksandras Štromas and Tomas Venclova.

He returned to live in Lithuania in 2005.
