= Kazys Škirpa =

Lithuanian army officer and diplomat (1895–1979)

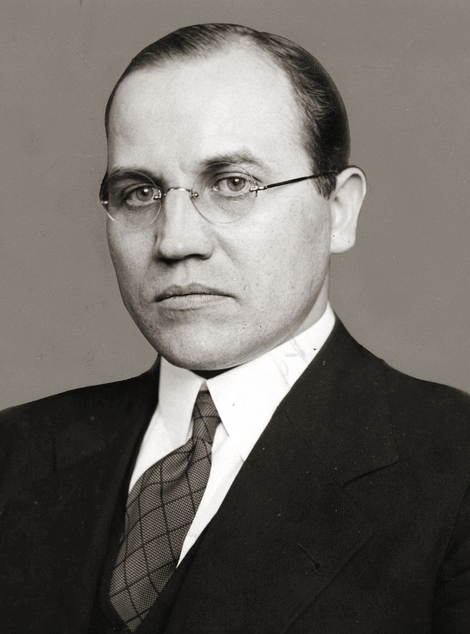
- Born: 18 February 1895; Namajūnai, Kovno Governorate, Russian Empire
- Died: 18 August 1979 (aged 84); Washington, D.C., United States
- Burial place: Petrašiūnai Cemetery (reburied in 1995)
- Education: Institute of Technology in Zurich; Higher Officers' Courses in Kaunas; Royal Military Academy (Belgium)
- Occupations: Military officer, diplomat
- Employer(s): Lithuanian Army; Government of Lithuania; Trinity College Dublin; Library of Congress
- Known for: Leader of the Lithuanian Activist Front
- Spouse: Bronė Škirpienė

Kazys Škirpa (18 February 1895 – 18 August 1979) was a Lithuanian military officer and diplomat. He founded the Lithuanian Activist Front (LAF), which attempted to establish Lithuanian independence in June 1941.

== Army career ==
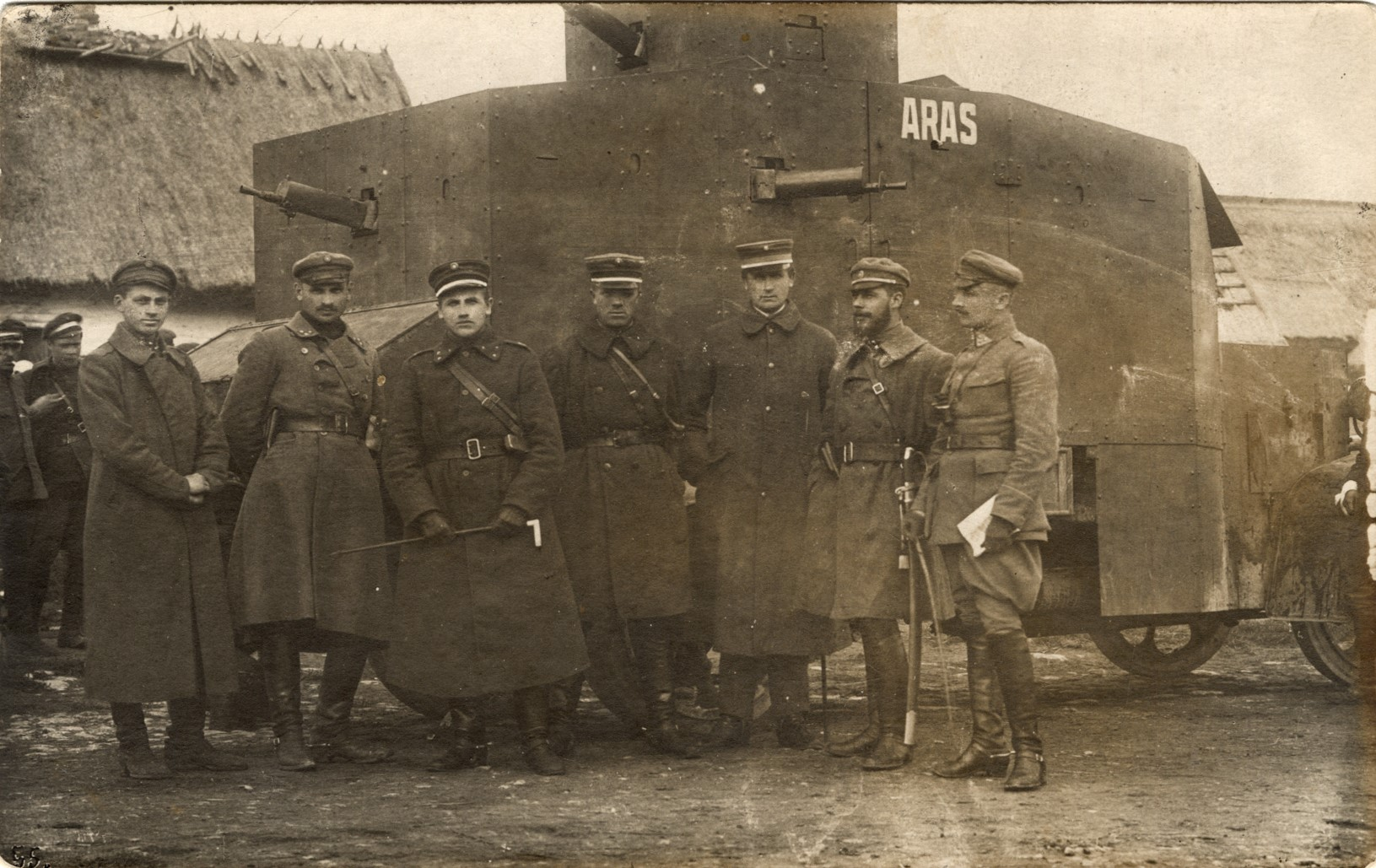
Škirpa with other Lithuanian officers at the Seinai front in 1920

In World War I, he was mobilised into the Imperial Russian Army and graduated from the Peterhof Military School. In 1917, he helped organise Lithuanian military units in Russia and attempted to form Lithuanian detachments in Petrograd. After Lithuania declared independence in 1918, he returned and was the first to enlist in the Lithuanian armed forces during the Lithuanian War of Independence. In January 1919, Škirpa was commandant of Vilnius and the men under his command raised the Lithuanian flag above Gediminas' Tower on 1 January 1919. It was the first time the flag had been raised in Vilnius, the historical capital of the Grand Duchy of Lithuania, and 1 January is commemorated as the flag day in Lithuania.

In 1920, as a member of the Lithuanian Popular Peasants' Union, he was elected to the Constituent Assembly of Lithuania. After that, he attended the Institute of Technology in Zurich, Higher Officers' Courses in Kaunas, and the Royal Military Academy (Belgium). On graduating in 1925, he worked as Chief of the General Staff, but was forced to resign after the 1926 Lithuanian coup d'état, because he had actively opposed it by trying to gather a military force to protect the government.

== Political career ==
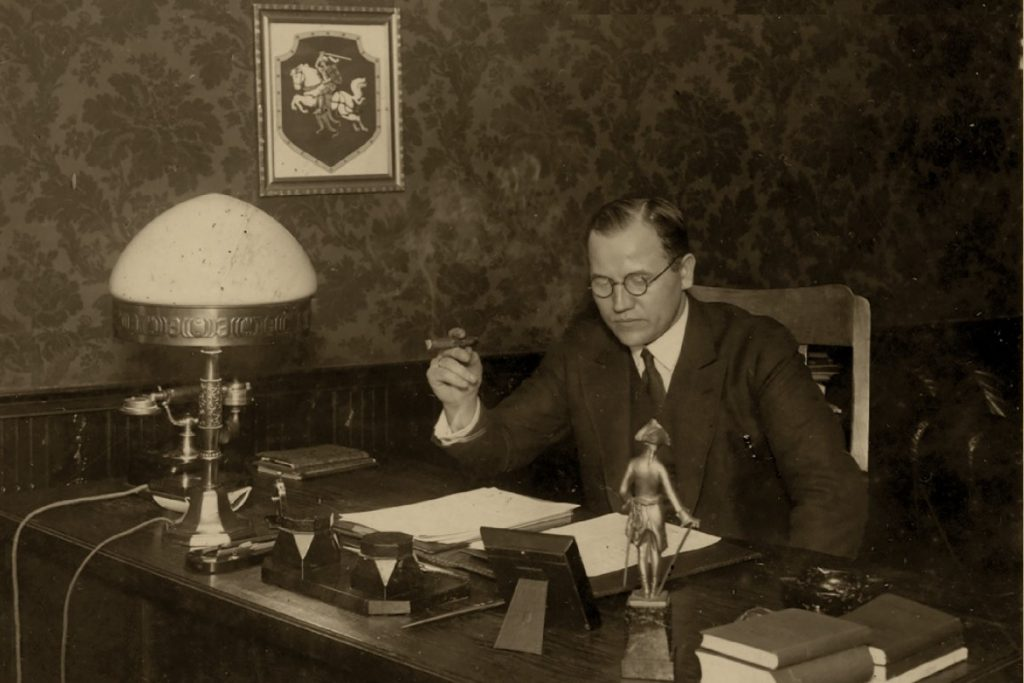
Kazys Škirpa in the Lithuanian embassy in Berlin. 1928

Later, he served as a Lithuanian representative to Germany (1927–1930), League of Nations (1937), Poland (1938), and again Germany (1938–1941). After the Soviet Union occupied Lithuania in 1940, Škirpa fled to Germany and founded the Lithuanian Activist Front (LAF), a resistance organization whose goal was to liberate Lithuania and re-establish its independence by working with the Nazis.

He was named prime minister in the Provisional Government of Lithuania; however, the Germans placed him under house arrest and did not allow him to leave for Lithuania. He moved from Berlin to southern Germany and was allowed a short visit to Kaunas only in October 1943. In June 1944, he was arrested for sending a memorandum to Nazi officials asking to replace German authorities in Lithuania with a Lithuanian government. He was imprisoned first in a concentration camp in Bad Godesberg and in February 1945 was moved to Jezeří Castle.

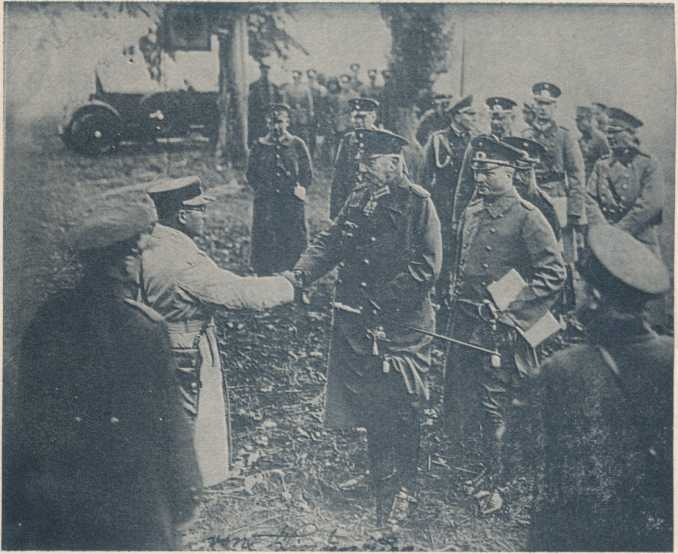
The Lithuanian Republic's military attaché in Germany, Colonel of the General Staff Kazys Škirpa, introduces himself to the President of Germany, Field Marshal Paul von Hindenburg, during the German army maneuvers in the Kissingen district in 1930.

== Later life ==
After the war, he went to Paris and from there to Dublin, where he taught Russian at Trinity College Dublin. In 1949, he emigrated to the United States. He worked at the Library of Congress. His memoir about the 1941 independence movement, Uprising for the Restoration of Lithuania's Sovereignty, was published in 1975. Originally interred in Washington, D.C., his remains were returned to Kaunas in June 1995, where he was reburied in Petrašiūnai Cemetery. The state-sponsored ceremony included honor guards at Vytautas the Great War Museum and speeches by then Lithuanian Prime Minister Adolfas Šleževičius and Defense Minister Linas Linkevičius.

== Controversy ==
In 1991, a street in Eiguliai district of Kaunas was renamed after Škirpa. In 2001, a memorial plaque was affixed to the building where he worked from 1925 to 1926. In 1998, an alley in Vilnius near the Vilnius Castle Complex was also named after Škirpa, commemorating his raising of the flag of Lithuania in 1919. In 2016, a memorial stone was installed at Škirpa's birthplace in Namajūnai.

These dedications have caused controversy in Lithuania due to his anti-Semitic writings. The issue of the plaque in Kaunas was raised in 2015. However, the government-funded Genocide and Resistance Research Centre of Lithuania denied his role in the Holocaust in Lithuania but acknowledged anti-Semitism in his writings, and the plaque remained. Public discussions about the alley in Vilnius were initiated in 2016. After a national debate and controversy, the city council led by the mayor Remigijus Šimašius voted to rename the alley in Vilnius to "Trispalvė" ("Tricolour", a reference to the flag of Lithuania) in July 2019. The street in Kaunas was not renamed.

== Awards ==
Škirpa received the following state awards and medals:

- Order of the Cross of Vytis (3rd degree, 1919)
- Order of the Cross of Vytis (5th degree with swords, 1920)
- Independence Medal (Lithuanian, 1928)
- Medal for the 10th Anniversary of the Liberation War (Latvia, 1929)
- Order of Vytautas the Great (3rd degree, 1935)
- Order of the Cross of the Eagle (Estonia, 2nd and 3rd degree, 1938)
- Order of Polonia Restituta (Poland, 1st degree, 1939)
