= Provisional Government of Lithuania =

1941 temporary government of Lithuania

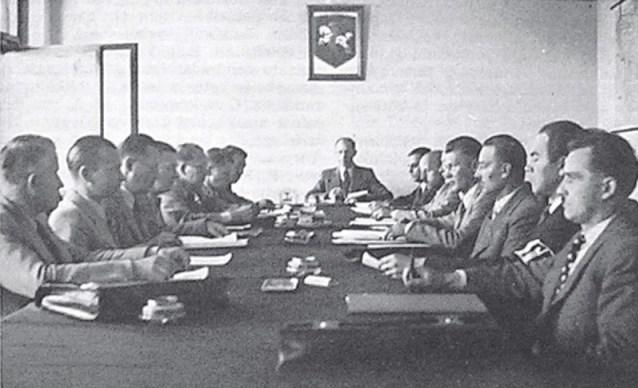
Session of the Provisional Government of Lithuania under the chairmanship by Juozas Ambrazevičius-Brazaitis in Kaunas, 1941.

The Provisional Government of Lithuania (Lithuanian: Lietuvos Laikinoji Vyriausybė) was an attempted provisional government to form an independent Lithuanian state in the last days of the first Soviet occupation and the first weeks of the German occupation of Lithuania during World War II in 1941.

It was secretly formed on 22 April 1941, announced on 23 June 1941, and dissolved on 5 August 1941. It was formed by members of the Lithuanian Activist Front (LAF) in Kaunas and Vilnius.

== History ==
"The Lithuanian nation, tormented by the brutal Bolshevik terror, decided to build its future on the basis of national unity and social justice."

— Leonas Prapuolenis, the first announcement of the Provisional Government through the recently captured Kaunas radio.

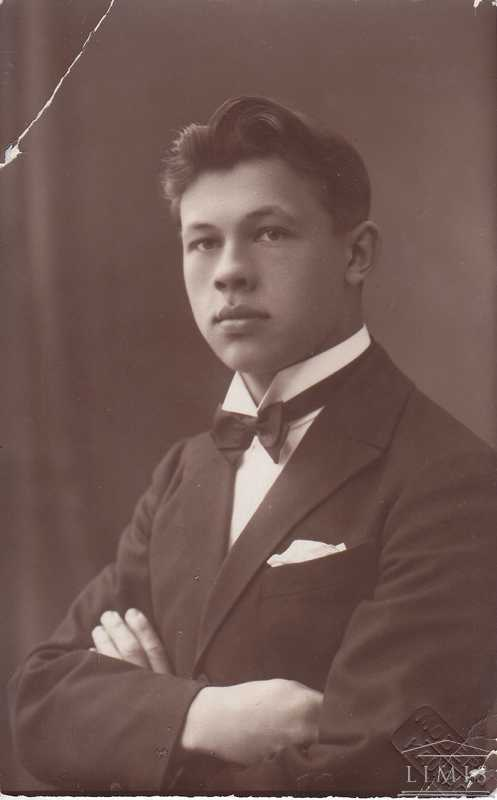
Juozas Ambrazevičius-Brazaitis, acting prime minister of the Provisional Government

Front page of the first issue of the newspaper Į laisvę ("Towards Freedom") with the declaration of independence

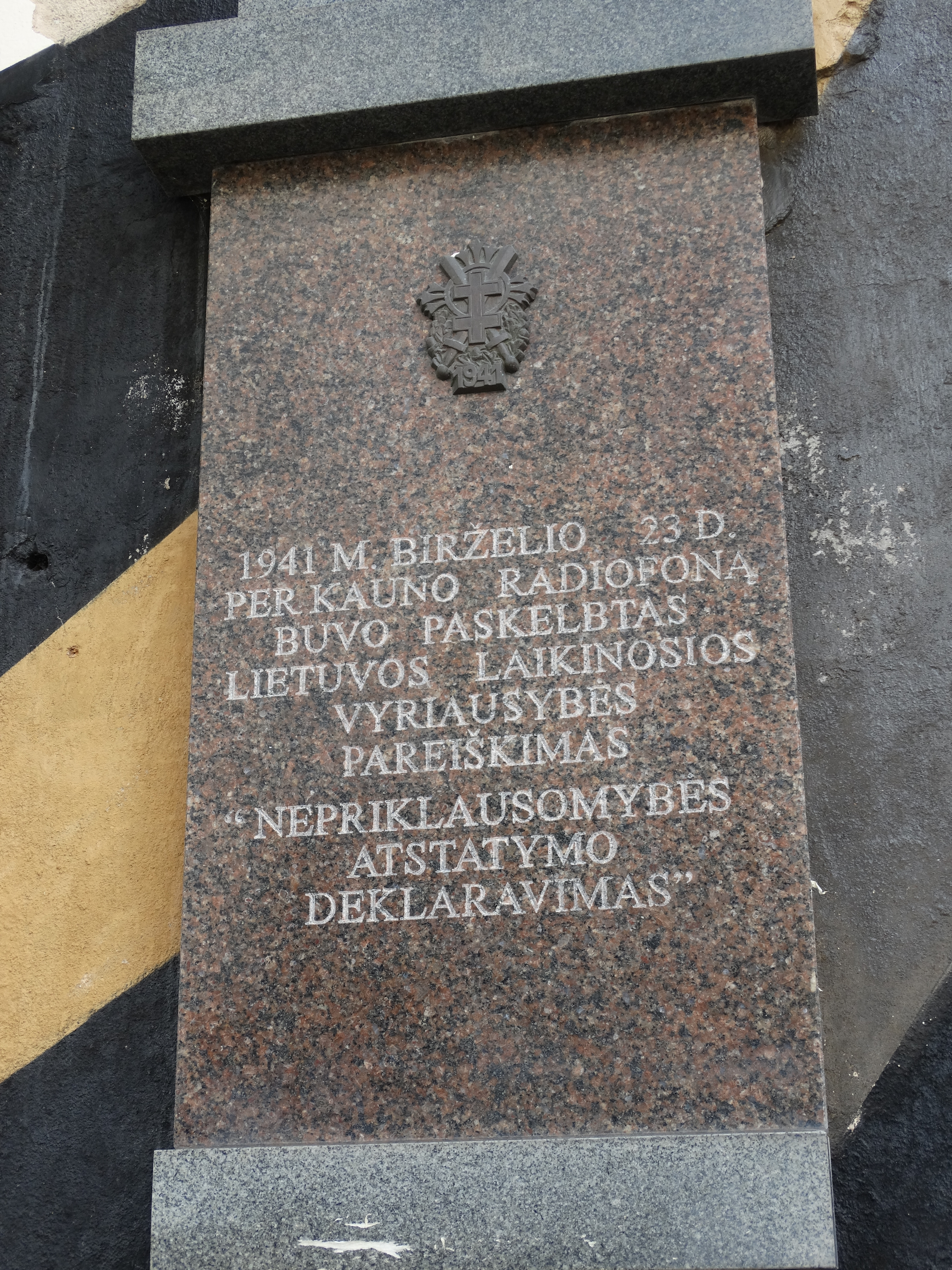
Memorial plaque on the wall of the former radiophone building in Kaunas

The Lithuanian Activist Front announced the creation of the provisional government on 22 June 1941, as the June Uprising in Lithuania began.

The Nazi regime envisioned Lithuania as a future part of Greater Germany, and was not interested in Lithuanian independence. It did allow the Provisional Government to operate while it was useful.

Literary historian Juozas Ambrazevičius-Brazaitis became acting prime minister instead of Škirpa. He served from June 23, 1941 to August 5, 1941.

Vygantas Vareikis wrote that the Lithuanian Provisional Government "did not encourage brutal actions" against Jews or LAF leaders, and the local press proposed that only high-ranking Communist officials and NKVD officers should be punished by death. Lithuanian rebels had liberated Lithuania by the time the Wehrmacht arrived, and rescued over 300 political prisoners who would have been killed by the NKVD. The June Uprising laid the foundations for anti-Nazi resistance that later transformed into an anti-Soviet resistance. The Provisional Government did little to stop the anti-Jewish violence encouraged by the Nazis and the antisemitic leadership of the Lithuanian Activist Front. Lithuanian police battalions formed by the Provisional Government helped the Nazis carry out the Holocaust. Stanislovas Stasiulis pictured the history of the Holocaust in Lithuania as "three layers and periods." The first, he wrote, involves the relationship between Lithuanians and Jews during the Nazi occupation, and the second followed the Soviet re-occupation. The third period of interest covers the historiography since 1990, he wrote, which has attempted new and open discussions of the defensive (emigré) and ideological (Soviet) reactions to the Holocaust. The Soviet refusal to acknowledge the racialism of the Holocaust helped trigger a defensive cultural response known as the double genocide theory, which equated the Holocaust and the Stalinist brutality meted out to Lithuanian by the Soviets. Considered by some a form of Holocaust trivialization, this paradigm has sometimes been taken as far as portraying Nazi pogroms as retaliation.

LAF leader Kazys Škirpa, former Lithuanian envoy to Germany, was named prime minister. But he was in Berlin and the Germans put him under house arrest. Rapolas Skipitis, another minister-to-be in Berlin, was prevented from leaving as well. Vytautas Bulvičius was to become Minister of Defence but the Soviets arrested him on 2 June and General Stasys Raštikis replaced him.

The Provisional Government dissolved in August 1941 after deciding that it had failed to achieve an autonomous if not independent Lithuania under German patronage.

== Cabinet ==
The people who were meant to be in the government:

- Prime Minister: Colonel Kazys Škirpa (was prevented from taking office and put under house arrest in Berlin)
- Minister of Education, Acting Prime Minister: Juozas Ambrazevičius-Brazaitis
- Minister of Defense: Major Vytautas Bulvičius (arrested by Soviet forces on 2 June, executed in November), and later General Stasys Raštikis
- Minister of Foreign Affairs: Rapolas Skipitis (unable to leave Berlin)
- Minister of Internal Affairs: Vladas Nasevičius (arrested by Soviets on 21 June, later deported to Siberia)
- Minister of Finance: Jonas Matulionis
- Minister of Health: Ksaveras Vencius
- Minister of Trade: Vytautas Statkus (arrested by Soviets on 21 June, later deported to Siberia)
- Minister of Industry: Doctor engineer Adolfas Damušis
- Minister of Agriculture: Professor Balys Vitkus
- Minister of Social Security: Doctor Juozas Pajaujis-Javis
- Minister of Infrastructure: Engineer Vytautas Landsbergis-Žemkalnis
- Minister of Communication: Jonas Masiliūnas (arrested by Soviets on 21 June, later exiled to Siberia)
- Controller of State: Jonas Vainauskas (arrested by Soviets on 21 June)

== See also ==
- Lithuanian Activist Front
- Lithuanian TDA Battalion
- Wartime collaboration in the Baltic states
- Reichskommissariat Ostland (Generalbezirk Litauen)
- Lithuanian Soviet Socialist Republic
