= Lithuanian Activist Front =

Resistance organization opposing the 1940–41 Soviet annexation of Lithuania

The Lithuanian Activist Front (LAF; Lithuanian: Lietuvių aktyvistų frontas) was a Lithuanian underground resistance organization established in 1940 after the Soviets occupied Lithuania. Its goal was to free Lithuania and regain its independence. The LAF planned and executed the June uprising and established the short-lived Provisional Government of Lithuania, which disbanded after a few weeks. The Nazi authorities banned the LAF in September 1941. Its role in the three World War II invasions of Lithuania and the massacre of 95% of Lithuania's Jewish population remains ambiguous and the topic of conflicting information and opinion.

== Background ==
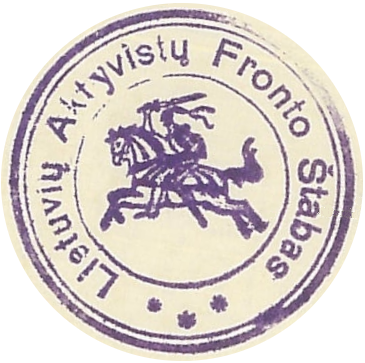
Seal of the Lithuanian Activist Front

The German-Soviet Non-Aggression Pact (Molotov–Ribbentrop Pact), signed on 23 August 1939, assured Nazi Germany and the Soviet Union of mutual non-aggression. A secret addendum divided the Baltic States and Poland between them and also reincorporated Vilnius into Lithuania. Another amendment a month later reassigned Lithuania from Germany to Russia.

In the first of the three invasions of Lithuania in the Second World War, the Soviets overthrew the government of Antanas Smetona in 1940 on the basis of a changing list of disparate pretexts. Many Lithuanians were relieved; newspapers had shut down, "the militia confiscated private property, ejected tenants from their homes, publicly called for liquidation of 'enemies of the people' and terrorized the population", and Smetona had stopped holding elections. The Germans arrived on 22 June 1941 and within days required the Jewish population to wear a star, among many other restrictions. Within a few more days, Einsatzkommando 9 was pulling Jewish men from their homes for purported work assignments.

Just days earlier, the NKVD had rounded up and deported between 15,851 and 20,000 “anti-Soviet elements” from across Lithuania. Most of the tens of thousands of people deported were sent to Siberia. Hundreds of political prisoners were tortured to death. The widespread press coverage blames the local Communists but also Jews, who were stereotyped by the Lithuanian media of the time as closely associated with the Soviets.

Historians generally divide the Lithuanian Shoah in four stages, Stanislovas Stasiulis writes:

1. late June to early July 1941: pogroms, actions aimed at Jewish men and alleged Communists
2. early July to mid-August: selective killings of specific individuals
3. mid-August to late November 1941: “Final Solution” in the countryside and larger towns, then ghettoization of Jews
4. 1942 to 1943: periodic selections, liquidation of ghettos.

By 1941 refugees had grown the Jewish population of Lithuania to approximately 250,000, or 10% of the total population.

During the German invasion of June 1941, 141,000 Jews were murdered. Unlike in Western Europe, Lithuanian Jews were generally killed a short distance from their homes. Notable execution locations were the Paneriai woods (see Ponary massacre) and the Ninth Fort.

== June uprising ==
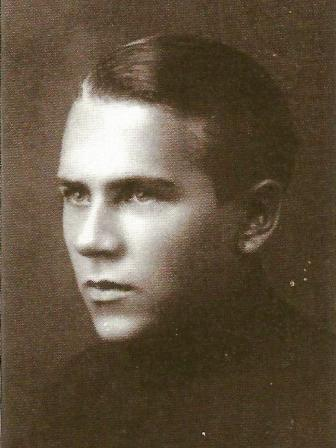
Leonas Prapuolenis, commander of the June Uprising in Lithuania, later arrested and sent to Dachau concentration camp

The LAF anticipated Nazi Germany's attack on the Soviet Union and planned to use it to rebel and re-establish an independent Lithuania.

Kazys Škirpa, a former Lithuanian military attaché to Germany, founded the LAF on 17 November 1940. to unite people with a wide spectrum of political beliefs who wanted to see an independent Lithuania that was not part of either the Soviet Union or Nazi Germany, Škirpa's Berlin unit mainly recruited Lithuanian expatriates and former diplomats, from most of the major pre-war Lithuanian factions and parties. The Nationalist Unionists and Christian Democrats were the most influential.

The Provisional Government was mainly recruited from the Vilnius and Kaunas sections of the LAF. On 22 April 1941, representatives of those sections agreed on a list of members of the planned Provisional Government of Lithuania.

Urban LAF units had more liberal political views than those in the countryside. Lack of communication between the Berlin unit and the Lithuanian units prevented ideological discussion though.

"Attention! Attention! This is Kaunas speaking. Independent Lithuania. Declaration of the restoration of Lithuania’s independence...The Lithuanian nation, tormented by the brutal Bolshevik terror, decided to build its future on the basis of national unity and social justice."

— Leonas Prapuolenis, first announcement of the Provisional Government on the captured Kaunas radio station.

== Provisional Government ==
The Provisional Government was short-handed when it took office on June 24, intending to exert the autonomy the Lithuanians hoped the Germans brought with them. Four members of the government were arrested by Soviet authorities on June 21, proposed prime minister Kazys Škirpa was under house arrest in Berlin, and another minister was also unable to serve. Juozas Ambrazevičius became prime minister.

"The historic interplay between the growth of anti-Soviet resistance in 1940–1941 and the behavior of many pro-Nazi Lithuanian collaborators during 1941–1944 is a complex story of nationalist idealism, political naivite, ideological contamination, obsequious opportunism and criminal intent," wrote historian Saulius Sužiedelis.

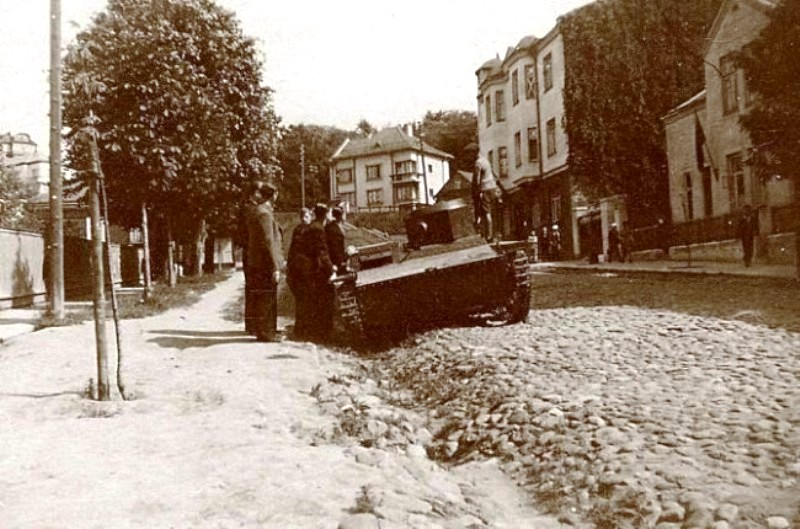
LAF activists inspect a T-38 tank from the Red Army in Kaunas

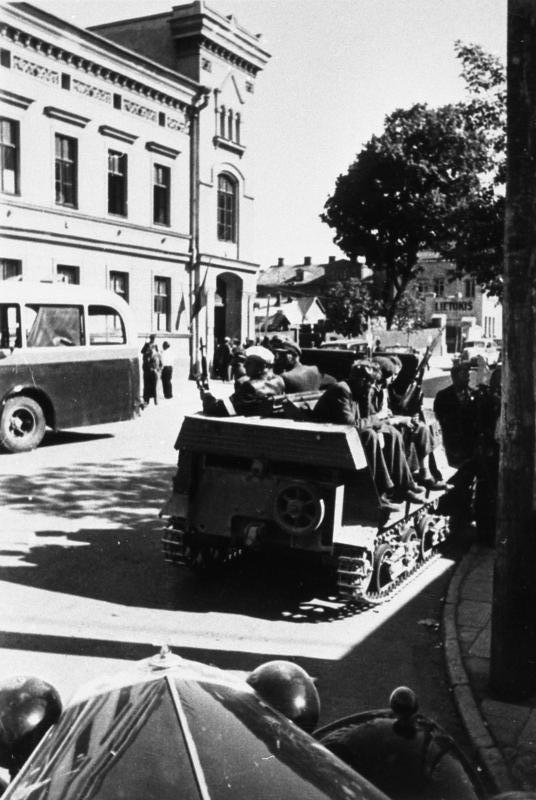
Lithuanian activists in Kaunas on June 25, 1941

But the Nazis had no interest in an independent Lithuania and General feldmarschall Walther von Brauchitsch issued a directive on June 26, 1941, to the commander of Army Group North under which "small armed Lithuanian groups and Lithuanian police" were to be disarmed and sent to concentration camps.

== Under Nazi Germany ==
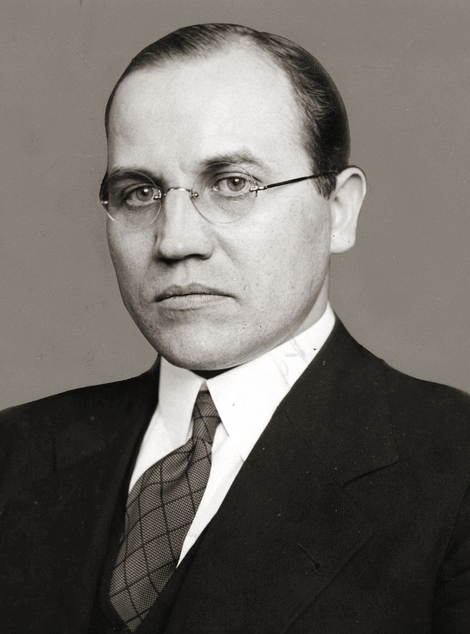
Kazys Škirpa, one of the main founders of LAF

The Provisional Government was mainly recruited from the Vilnius and Kaunas sections. Over time, many members of this government and the LAF were arrested, executed, or exiled by the Soviet authorities.

The Wehrmacht began disarming LAF activists in Kaunas on June 26 to 28. The last LAF activists were disarmed in Zarasai and Obeliai June 28–29. The German authorities did not use brute force, just established their own administrative structure, Reichskommissariat Ostland, and slowly deprived the would-be puppet government of its powers. It lost all authority in a few weeks, and seeing no more reason to continue, dissolved on August 5, 1941, LAF as an organization remained in existence. On September 15, it sent Germany a memorandum, About the status of Lithuania after the German Civil Administration started to operate (Apie Lietuvos būklę, vokiečių civilinei administracijai pradėjus veikti), protesting the occupation of Lithuania and expressing hope that Germany would not extend its territory at the expense of Lithuania. The Lithuanian Activist Front was banned on September 26, its property confiscated, and its leader Leonas Prapuolenis arrested and sent to Dachau concentration camp. Other members like Pilypas Žukauskas and Petras Paulaitis joined the anti-Nazi resistance.

=== Vilnius ===
For historic and religious reasons, Vilnius was very important to Lithuanians, with Jonas Biliūnas calling it “the very heart” of the fatherland in 1900. Its effect on Lithuanian national consciousness after World War II has been described as "selective memory" which downplayed the religious aspects of the history while stressing its "secular, cultural and linguistic aspects". Lithuania accepted a military presence to regain administrative control of Vilnius. The former capital of the Polish-Lithuanian Commonwealth was considered part of Lithuania under Antanas Smetona, but since the city had been taken by the Poles in a false flag operation in October 1920, the city had become more Polish and more Jewish, a situation made even more so by refugees, garrisons and POW camps after the German invasion of Poland.

The LAF section in Vilnius under Vytautas Bulvičius was dismantled by Soviet arrests just before the German invasion, and even before that, Lithuanians had only been a small minority of the city's population. The uprising was therefore smaller there, than elsewhere and only started on June 23. The rebels took the post office and radio station, and hoisted the Lithuanian flag over Gediminas' Tower. It was relatively easy to take Vilnius, as most Red Army units were outside the city and quickly retreated.

== Controversy ==
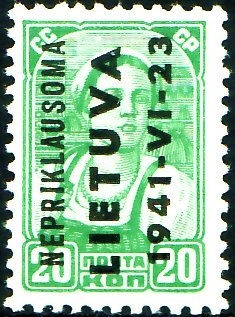
Soviet poststamp with LAF overprint Independent Lithuania 1941 06 23

The LAF routinely engaged in anti-Semitism. The LAF's manifesto "What Are the Activists Fighting for?" stated: "The Lithuanian Activist Front, by restoring the new Lithuania, is determined to carry out an immediate and fundamental purging of the Lithuanian nation and its land of Jews." The LAF's pro-Nazi rhetoric and stridently anti-Semitic propaganda, equating Jews with Bolshevism, was widely disseminated in Lithuania prior to and during the June uprising and likely encouraged the local population to engage in mass violence against Jews that began prior to the arrival of Nazi forces in the country and continued during the Nazi occupation (1941–1945).

"Our aim is to compel the Jews to flee Lithuania together with the Red Army troops and Russians. The more Jews abandon Lithuania under these circumstances, the easier it will be later to achieve complete liberation from the Jews. The hospitality that Vytautas the Great offered to the Jews in Lithuania has been revoked for all times for the ongoing betrayal of the Lithuanian nation." – LAF Pamphlet "Guidelines for the Liberation of Lithuania", March 1941

By some calculations, more than 95% of Lithuania's Jewish population was massacred during the Nazi occupation, a more complete destruction than befell any other country in the Holocaust. Historians attribute this to the massive collaboration in the genocide by the non-Jewish local paramilitaries, though the reasons for this collaboration are still debated.

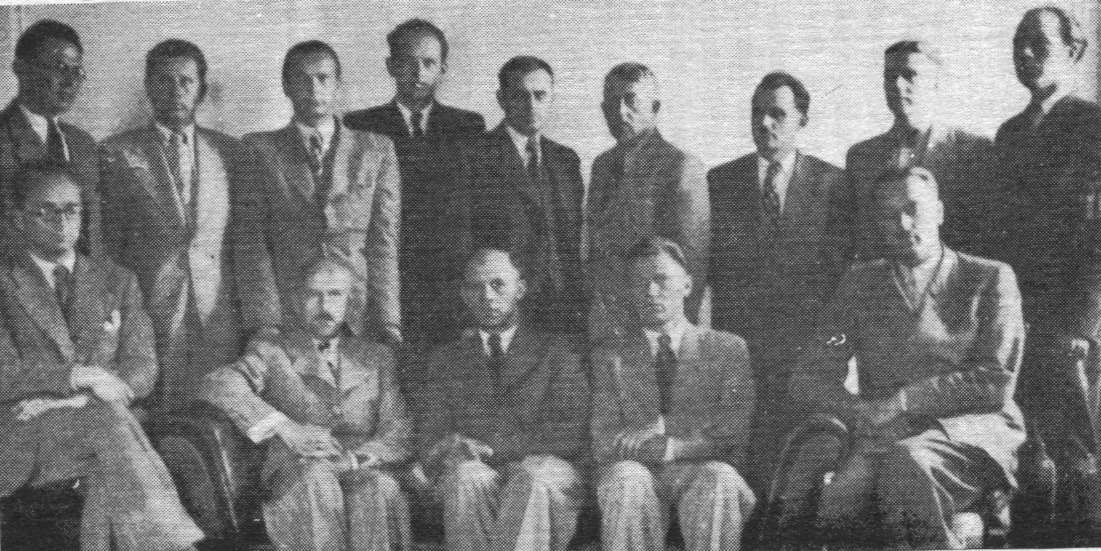
Participants of the last session of the Provisional Government of Lithuania

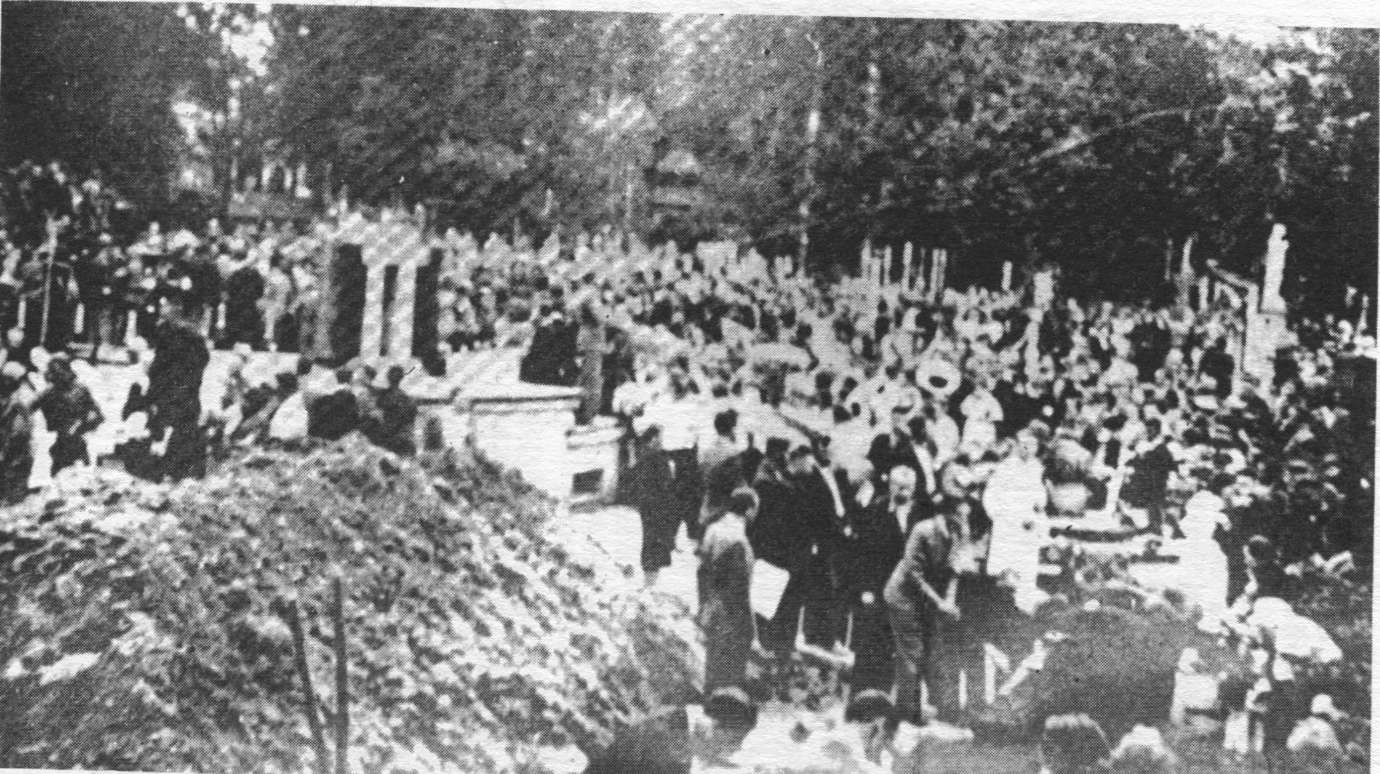
Funeral of perished Lithuanian Activist Front members in Kaunas on June 26, 1941

The goal of the June uprising organized by the LAF was to seize control of Lithuania as Soviet forces retreated in the face of Germany's attack. LAF paramilitaries committed many atrocities in the uprising (rapes, murders, pillage). According to Tadeusz Piotrowski, the Germans referred to these "allies" as "organized robbers". At the beginning of the occupation, Acting Prime Minister of the Provisional Government of Lithuania Juozas Ambrazevičius (also called Juozas Brazaitis) convened a meeting in of cabinet ministers with former President Kazys Grinius, Bishop Vincentas Brizgys and others. At the very beginning of the Nazi occupation, the affairs of Jews and Poles were excluded from Lithuanian jurisdiction and taken over by the Germans and German military commanders. On the other hand, a number of laws issued by the LAF-instituted Provisional Government of Lithuania discriminated against Jews. for example Žydų padėties nuostatai (English: Regulation on the Status of Jews), although according to some authors they were never actually adopted and were only considered by the Provisional Government. Žydų padėties nuostatai was widely used in the Soviet propaganda. However physical signs that this document initially was not kept with enacted legal texts and was pulled into a set of rulings by the German-appointed councillors as if it were a Provisional Government rule, when the Provisional Government had already withdrawn. Žydų padėties nuostatai was not published anywhere at the time and the affairs of Lithuanian Jews were never governed by it.

Nazi authorities surreptitiously encouraged and involved the local population in attacks on Jews. These tactics are well disclosed on October 15, 1941, report to Reich Minister Heinrich Himmler. Schutzstaffel General Brigadeführer and Security Police Chief of the Occupied Eastern Territories Franz Walter Stahlecker. In this report Stahlecker states that the extermination of Jews in the Wehrmacht-occupied territories should be performed in a way that would keep the Nazis "clean" and show no sign of actual Nazi inspiration, October 15, 1941, report to Reich Minister Heinrich Himmler. organization or management. It should look like the local population and its institutions on their own initiative executed the Jewish population. The LAF and its paramilitaries initially proved useful for this. But Stahlecker later complained that it was "not a simple matter" to organize Lithuanians into taking actions against Jews.

Lithuanian Minister of National Defence General Stasys Raštikis (former Commander of the Lithuanian Army) met personally with German generals to discuss anti-Jewish violence and Lithuanian society, government dissatisfaction and concern about the persecution and extermination of the Lithuanian Jews started by the Germans. He demanded that the campaign against Jews in Kaunas and in the province now be stopped, but the Nazi generals refused, with one of them even unexpectedly pouring cold water on Raštikis' head when he was leaving.

Meanwhile, the LAF-established Provisional Government of Lithuania did little to oppose the anti-Jewish violence and murder carried out by the Nazis and their local collaborators. Its main goal was to protect ethnic Lithuanians and re-establish an independent Lithuania under the patronage of Nazi Germany. Ministers expressed distress at the atrocities being committed against the Jews, but advised only that "despite all the measures which must be taken against the Jews for their Communist activity and harm done to the German Army, partisans and individuals should avoid public executions of Jews." It is known that the Provisional Government attempted to stop collaborator Algirdas Klimaitis, later condemning him for his actions during the Kaunas pogrom. Klimaitis and his gang members were unaffiliated with the LAF, which organized the June Uprising, as he and his gang members were imprisoned in a Bolsheviks' prison and left it only during the first days of the war. According to Lithuanian-American Holocaust historian Saulius Sužiedėlis, "none of this amounted to a public scolding which alone could have persuaded at least some of the Lithuanians who had volunteered or been co-opted into participating in the killings to rethink their behavior."

The Lithuanian TDA Battalions, military units of the Provisional Government, were soon taken over by Nazi officials and reorganized into the Lithuanian Auxiliary Police Battalions (Lithuanian version of Schutzmannschaft). The original TDA eventually became the 12th and the 13th Police Battalions. These two units took an active role in mass killings of the Jews in Lithuania and Belarus. Based on the Jäger Report, members of TDA murdered about 26,000 Jews between July and December 1941.

Later Juozas Ambrazevičius actively participated in the anti-Nazi underground, and four members of the Provisional Government were imprisoned in the Nazi concentration camps. There are allegations by certain journalists that, in 1973, a Committee of the United States Congress made conclusions that Prime Minister of the Provisional Government Juozas Ambrazevičius' and Jonas Šlepetys' were not responsible for the Holocaust in Lithuania. However, a subsequent clarification issued in 2019 by the Foreign Affairs Committee of the US Congress said the investigation was not conclusive and did not amount to a "rehabilitation" of Ambrazevičius/Brazaitis. The investigation into his wartime activities was discontinued after Ambrazevičius/Brazaitis died in 1974.

== See also ==
- Supreme Committee for the Liberation of Lithuania
