= Armorial of Lithuania =

The National coat of arms of Lithuania is a mounted armoured knight holding a sword and shield, known as Vytis (pronounced ['vîːtɪs]). Since the early 15th century, it has been Lithuania's official coat of arms and is one of the oldest European coats of arms. The coat of arms features a red field with a white (silver) armoured knight on a white (silver) horse holding in his right hand a white (silver) sword above his head.

The present coats of arms of Lithuania are authorized by the President of Lithuania with suggestions by Lithuanian Heraldry Commission (Lietuvos heraldikos komisija), a heraldic authority appointed by presidential decrees. The Lithuanian Heraldry Commission also established regulations on Lithuanian coats of arms.

This is a list of current coat of arms of Lithuania, its military, government, cultural regions, counties, municipalities, cities, towns and historical coats of arms.

== National ==
Coat of arms of Lithuania

Coat of arms of President of Lithuania

Coat of arms of the Seimas of Lithuania

Coat of arms of the Ministry of Agriculture of Lithuania

Coat of arms of the Ministry of the Interior of Lithuania

Coat of arms of the Police of Lithuania

Coat of arms of the Lithuanian Ministry of Defence

== Military ==
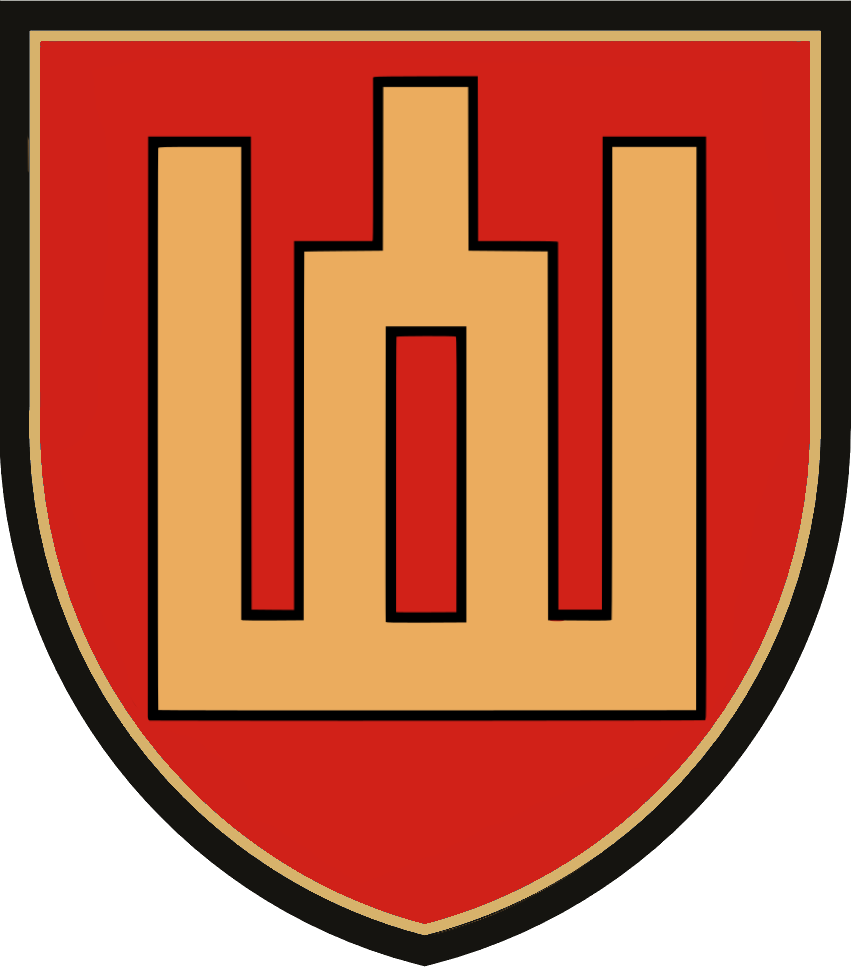
Lithuanian Armed Forces

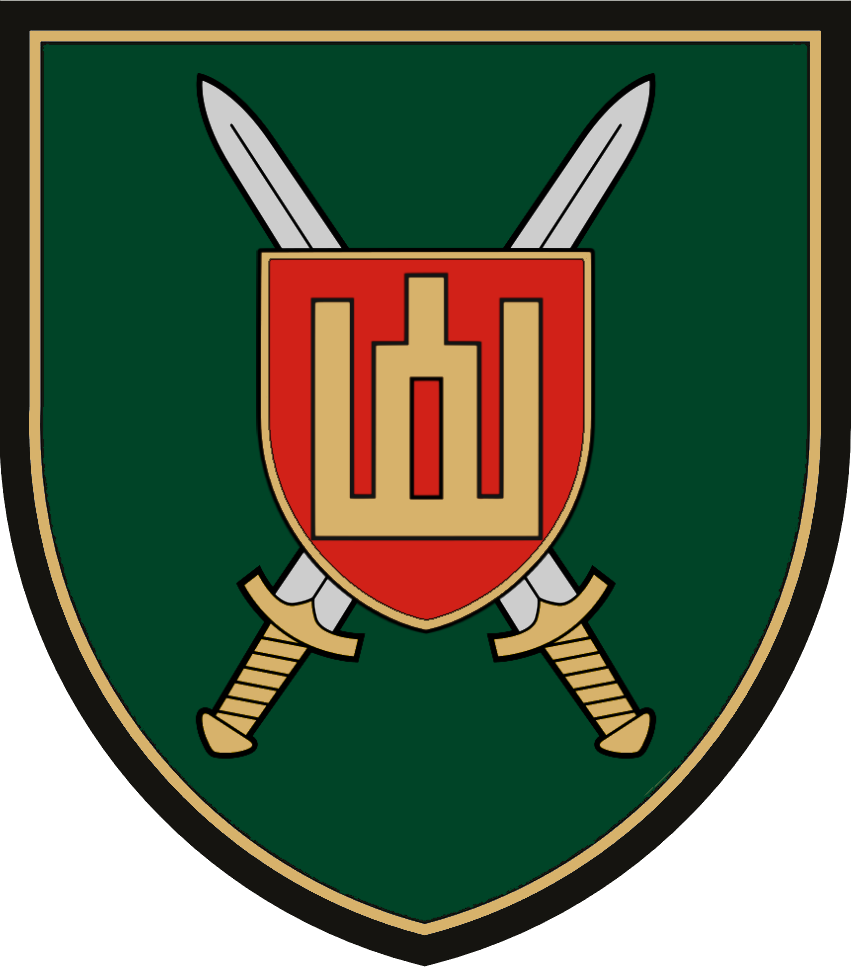
Lithuanian Land Forces

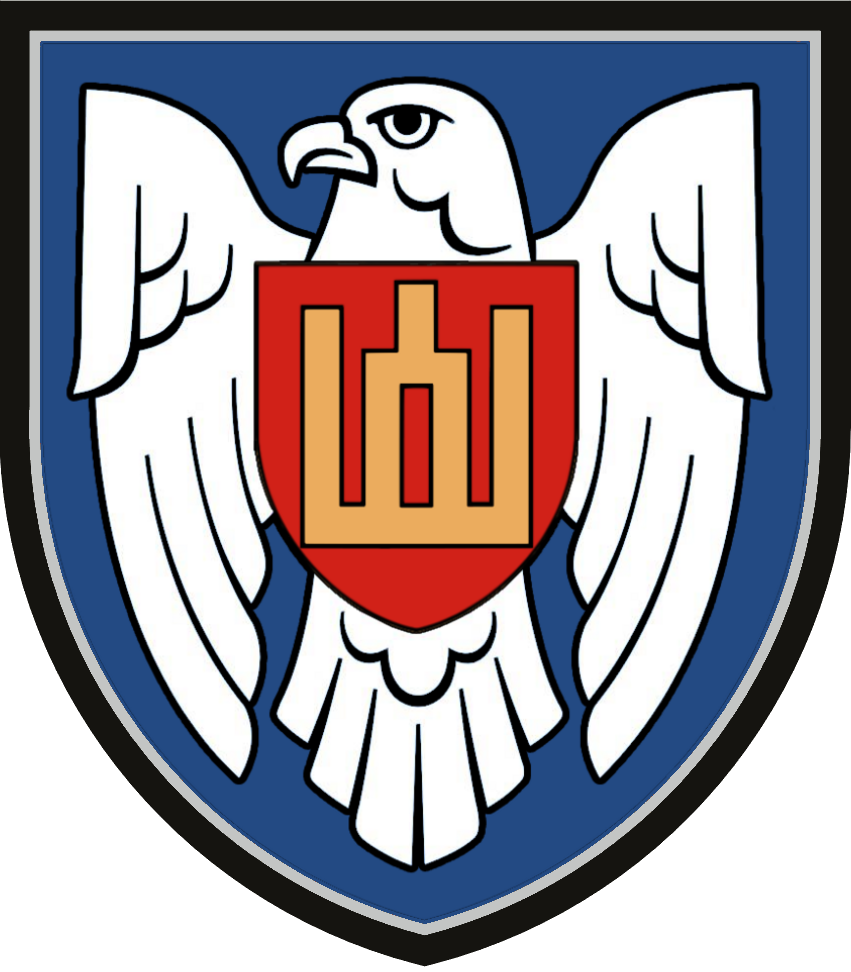
Lithuanian Air Forces

Lithuanian Naval Forces

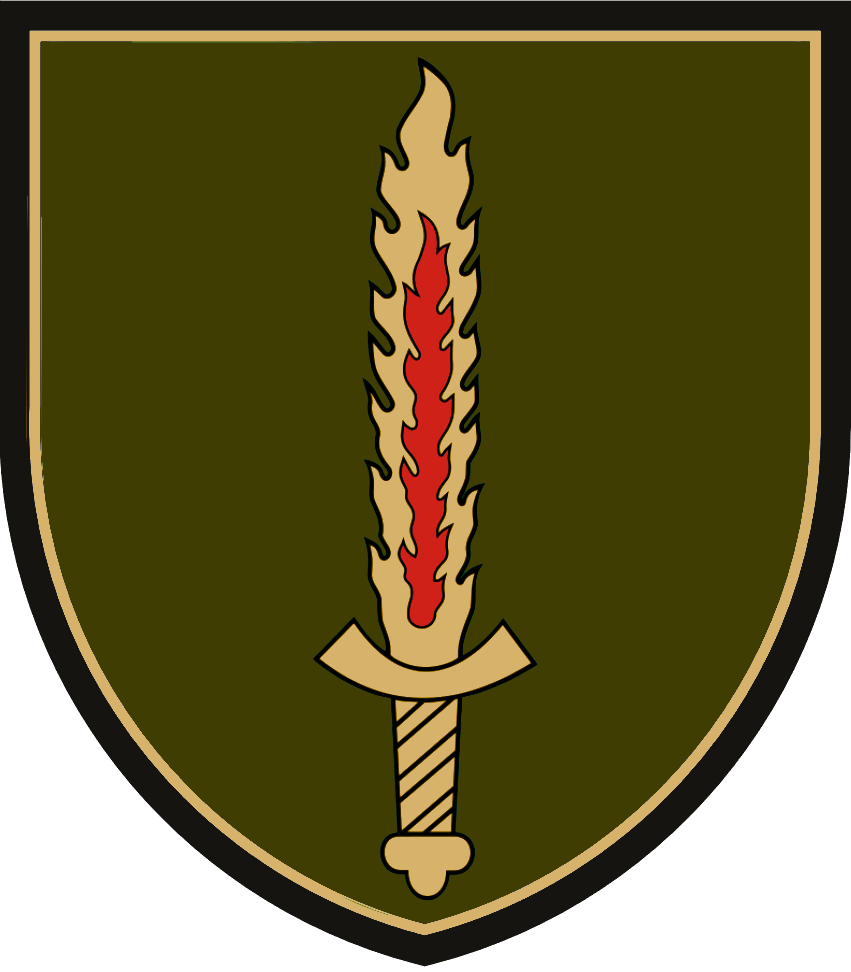
Lithuanian Special Operations Forces

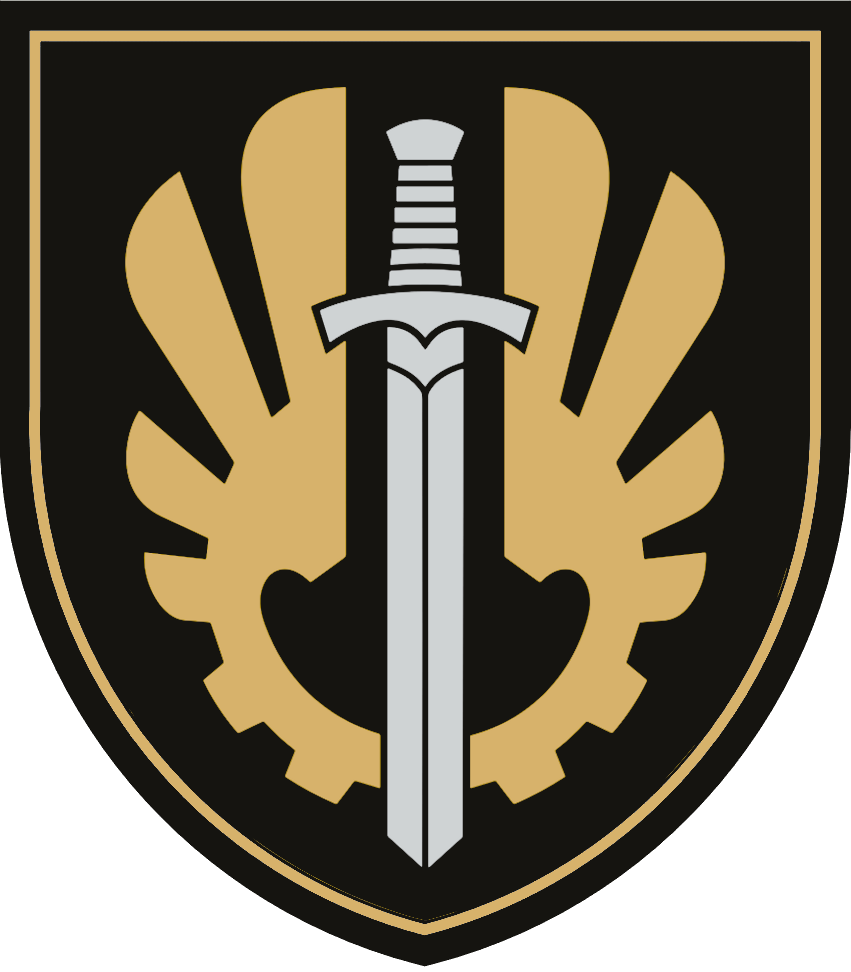
Lithuanian Logistics Command

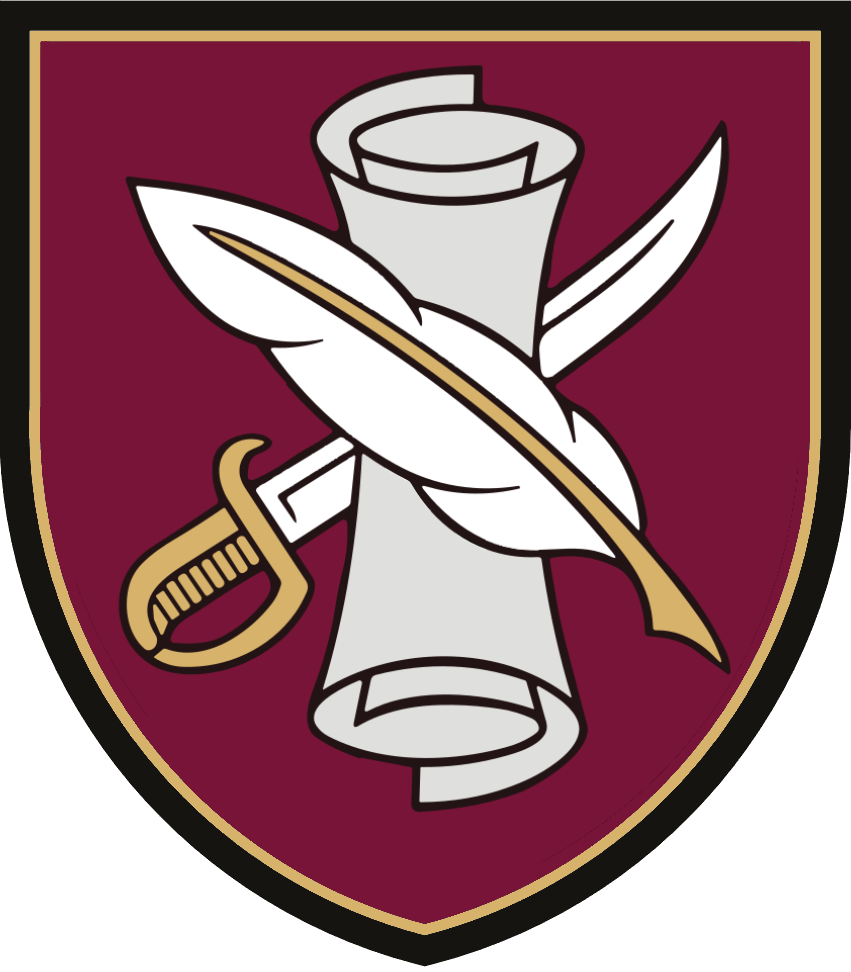
Lithuanian Training and Doctrine Command

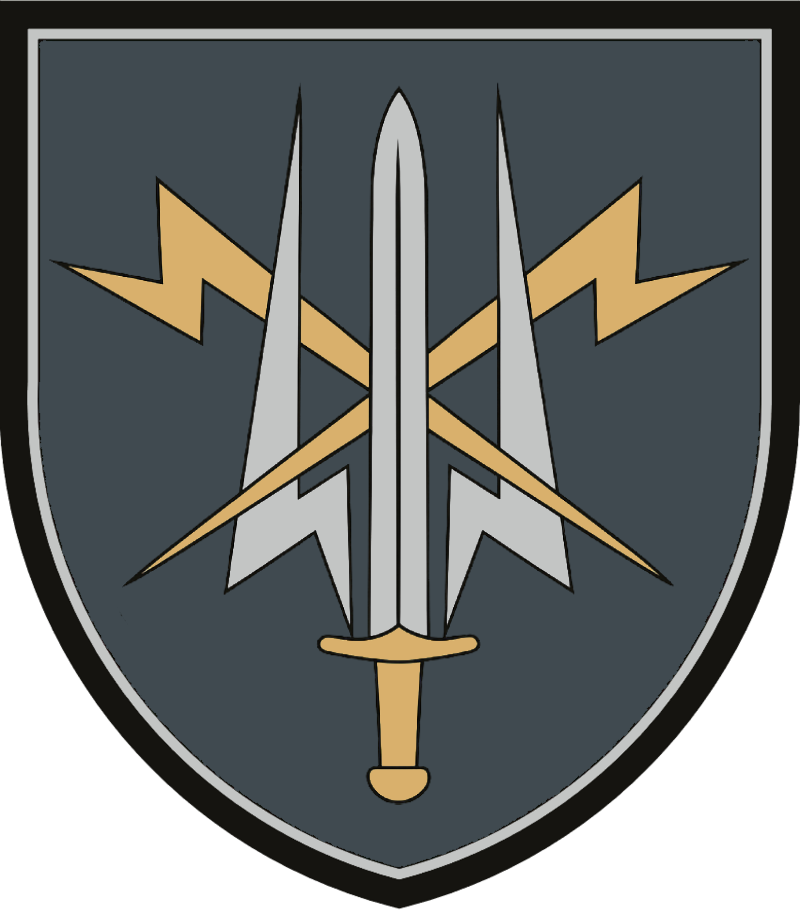
Lithuanian Cyber Defence Command

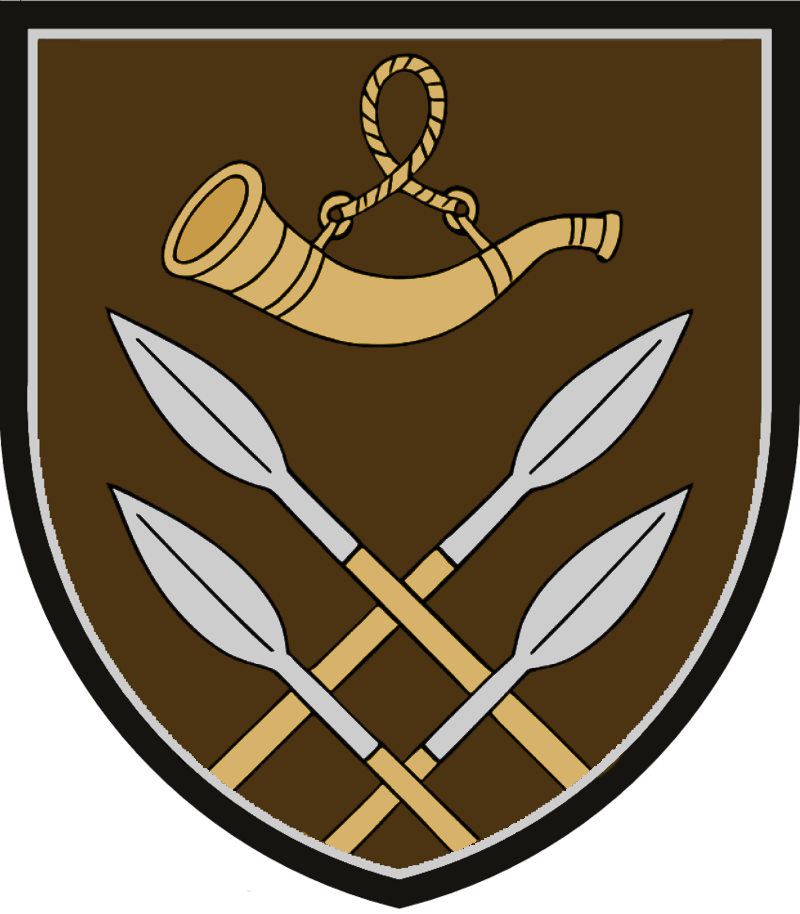
Military Commandant's Offices Command

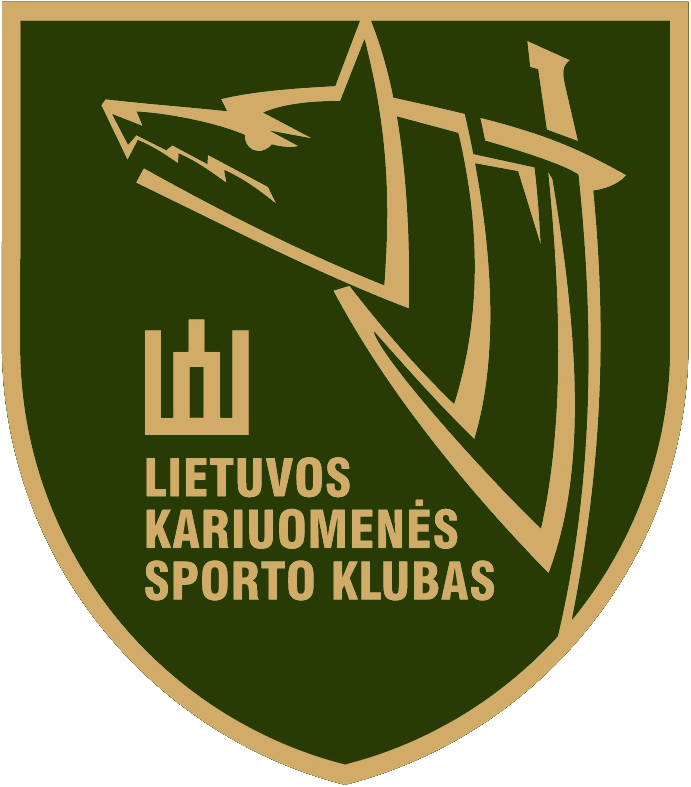
Lithuanian Military Sports Club (CISM delegation)

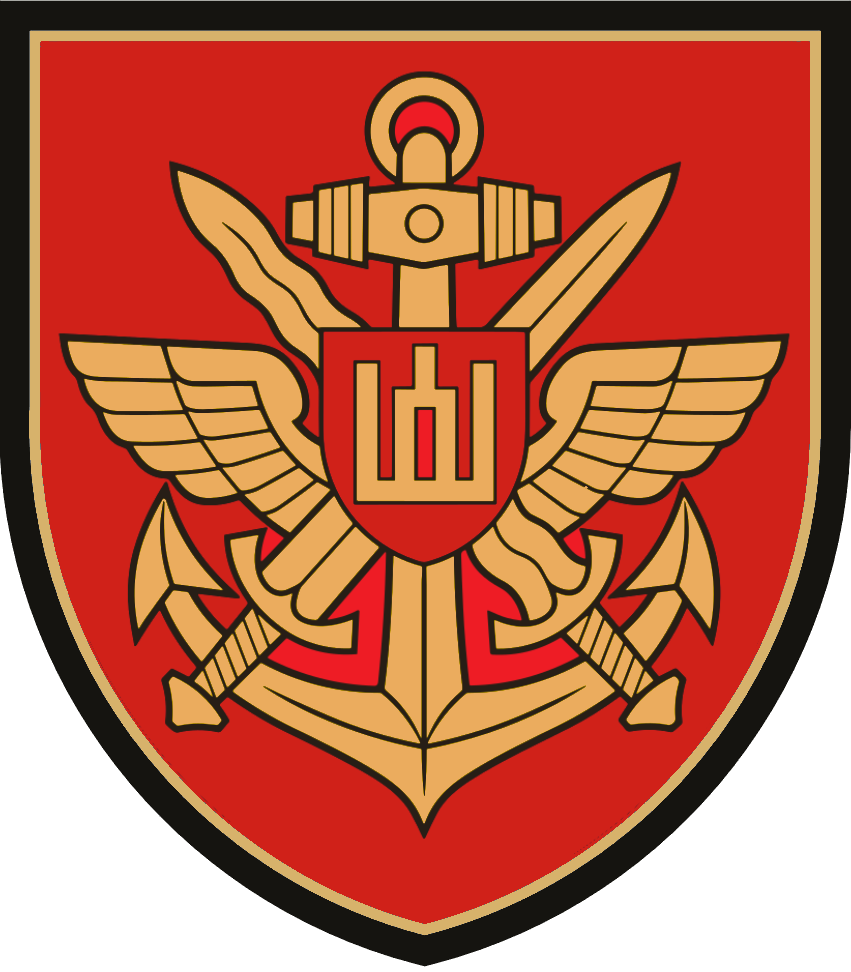
Lithuanian Armed Forces Defence Staff

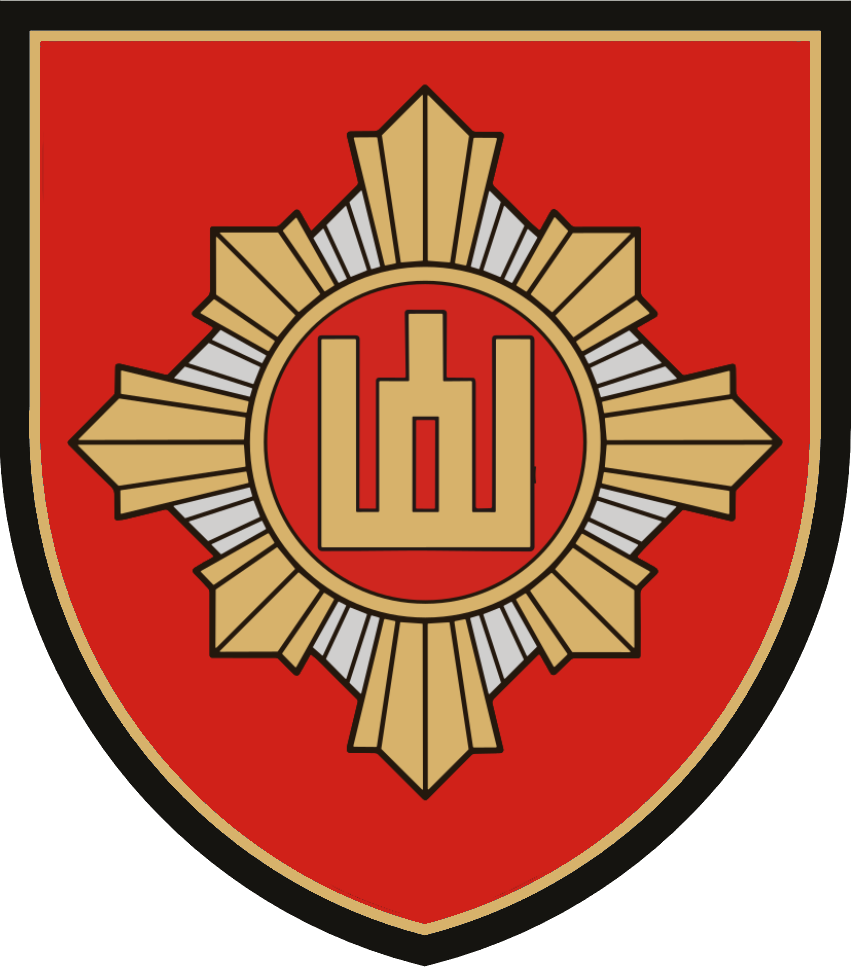
Lithuanian Military Police

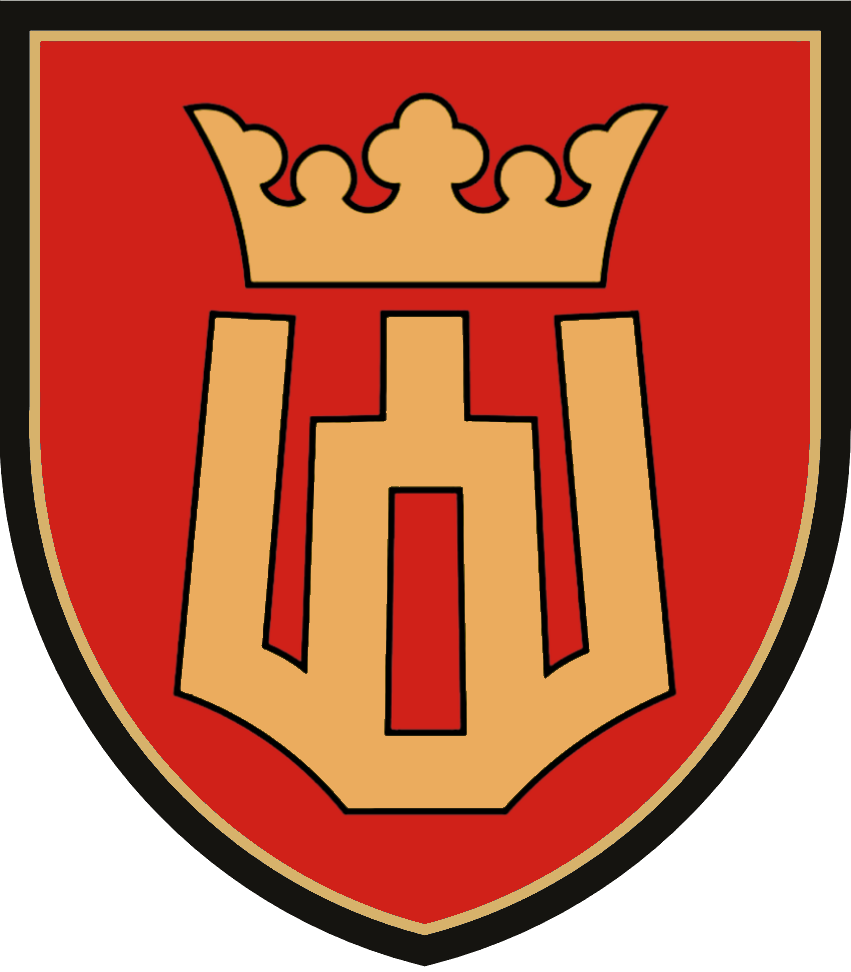
Grand Duke Gediminas Staff Battalion

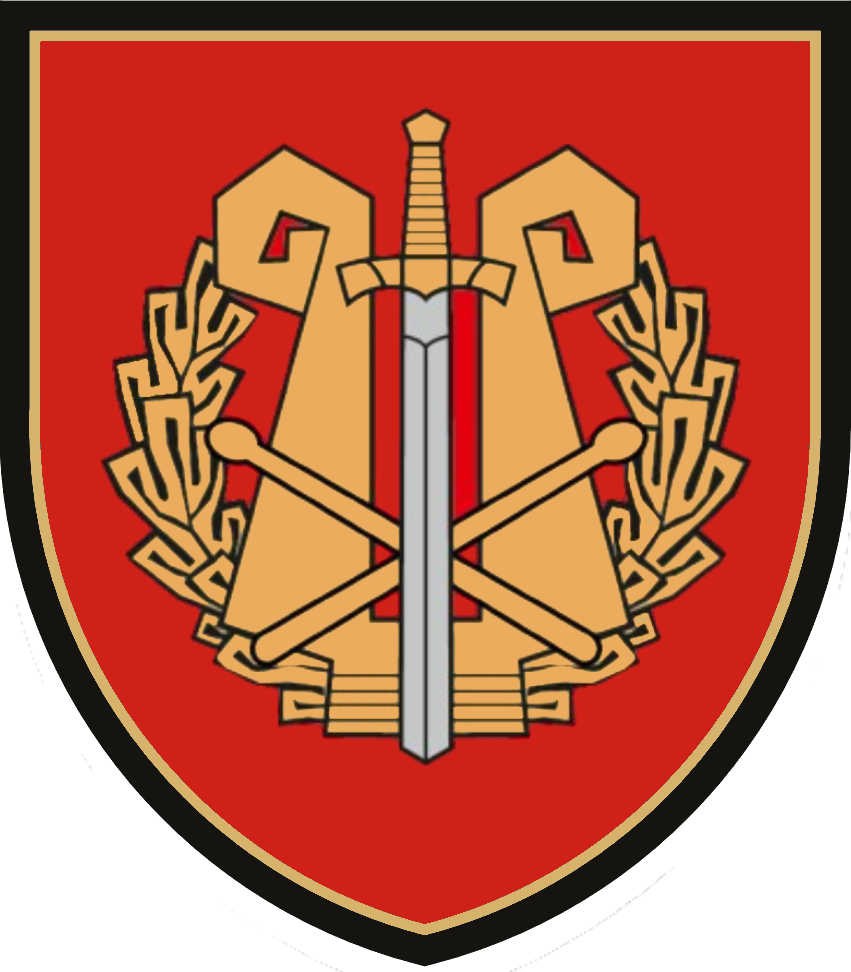
Lithuanian Armed Forces Headquarters Band

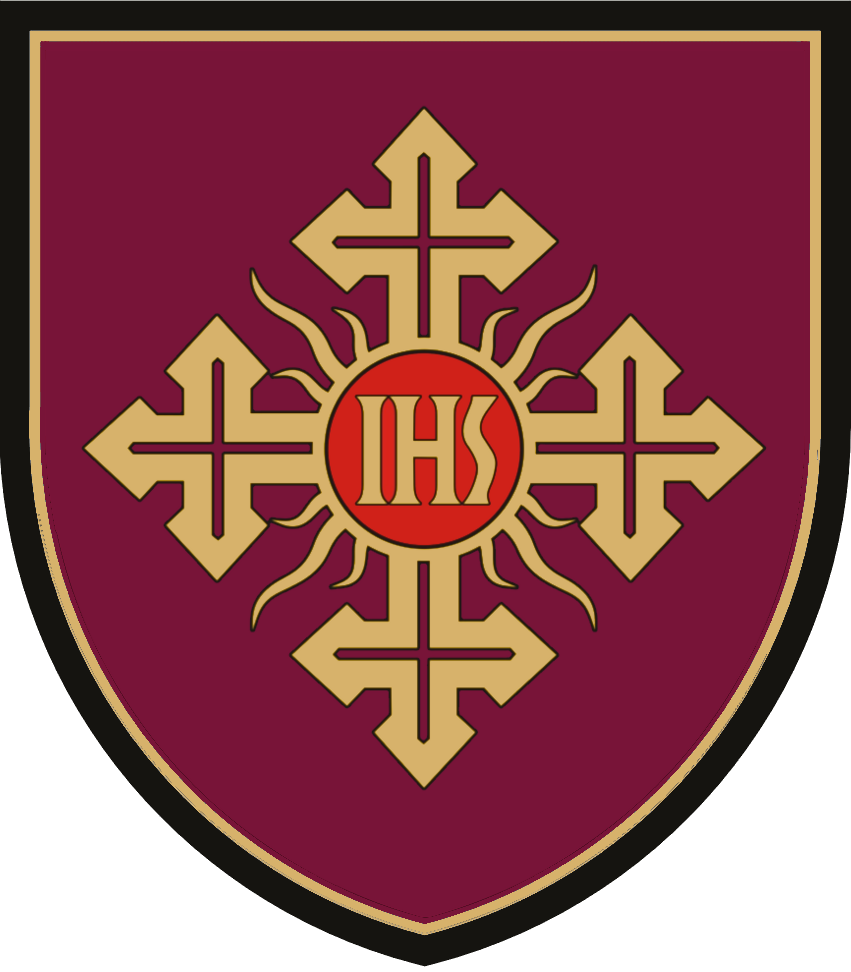
Lithuanian Military Ordinariate

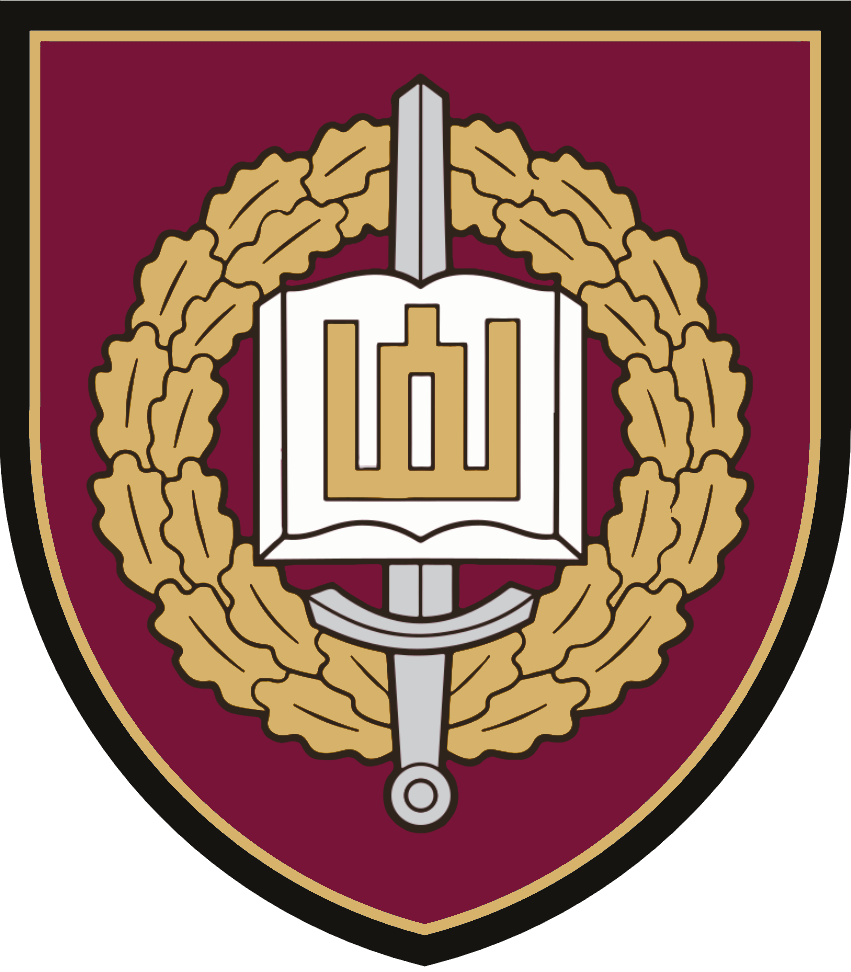
General Jonas Žemaitis Military Academy of Lithuania

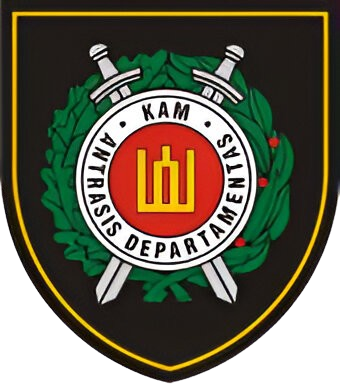
Second Investigation Department

Lithuanian Riflemen's Union

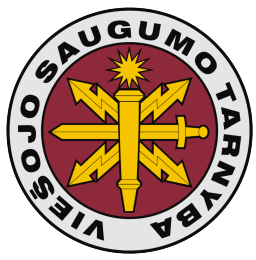
Public Security Service of Lithuania

Lithuanian State Border Guard Service

=== Lithuanian Land Forces ===
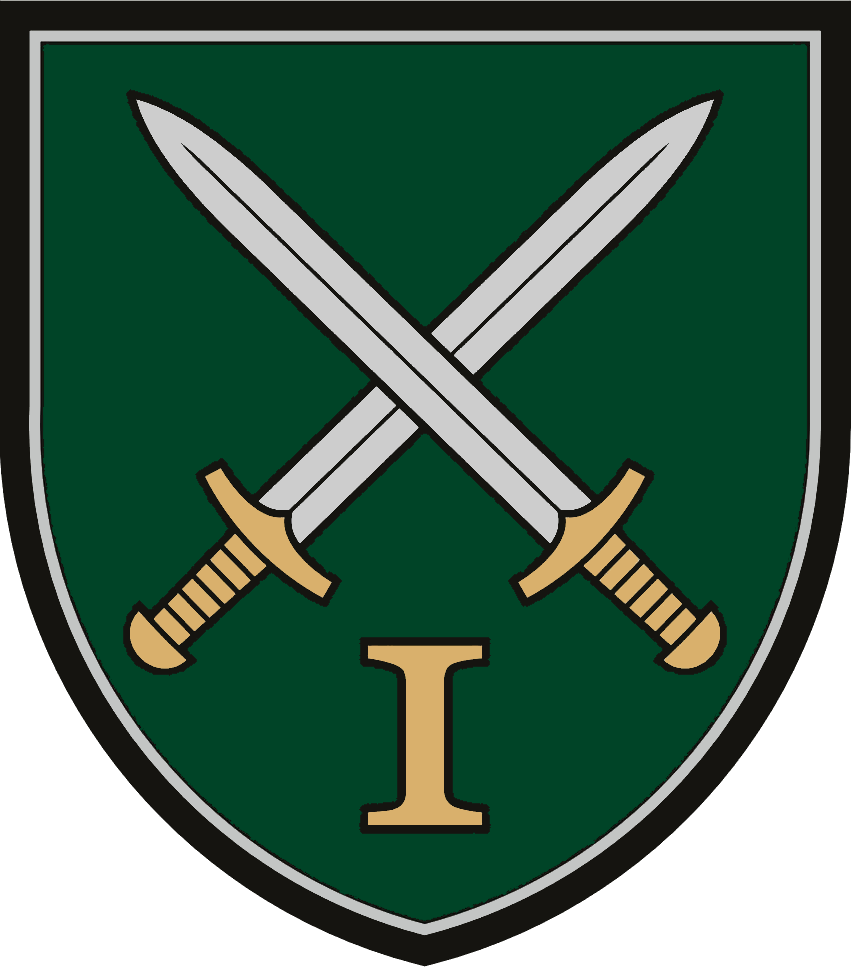
1st Division

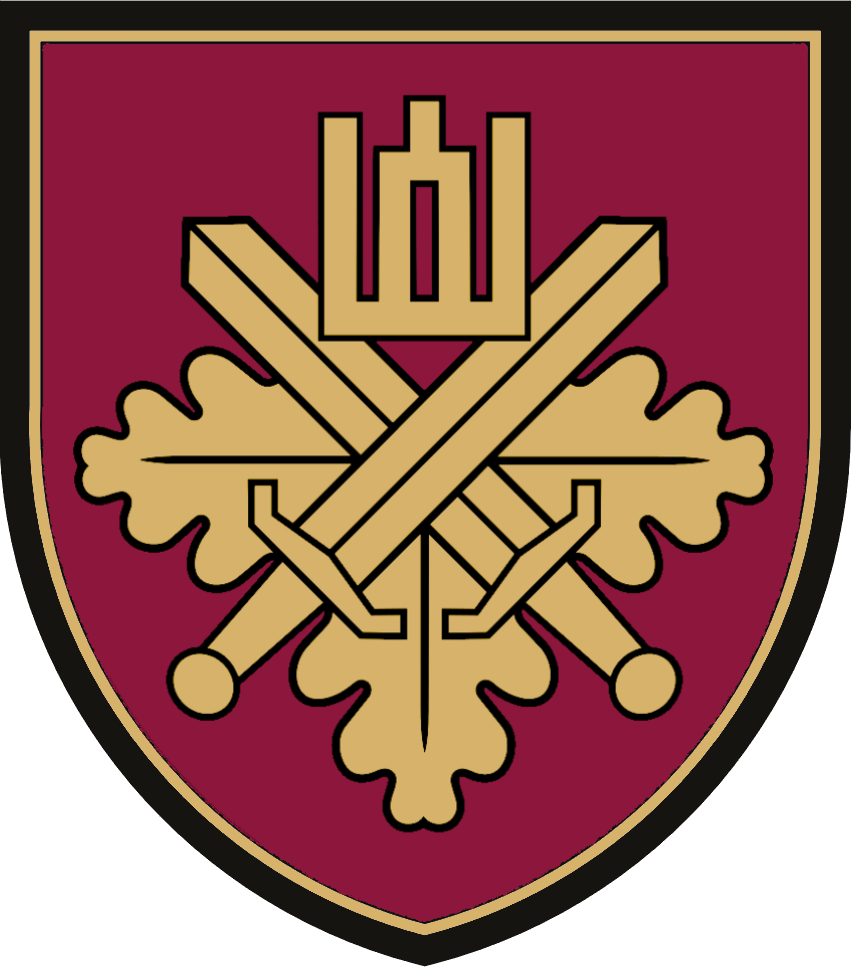
National Defence Volunteer Forces

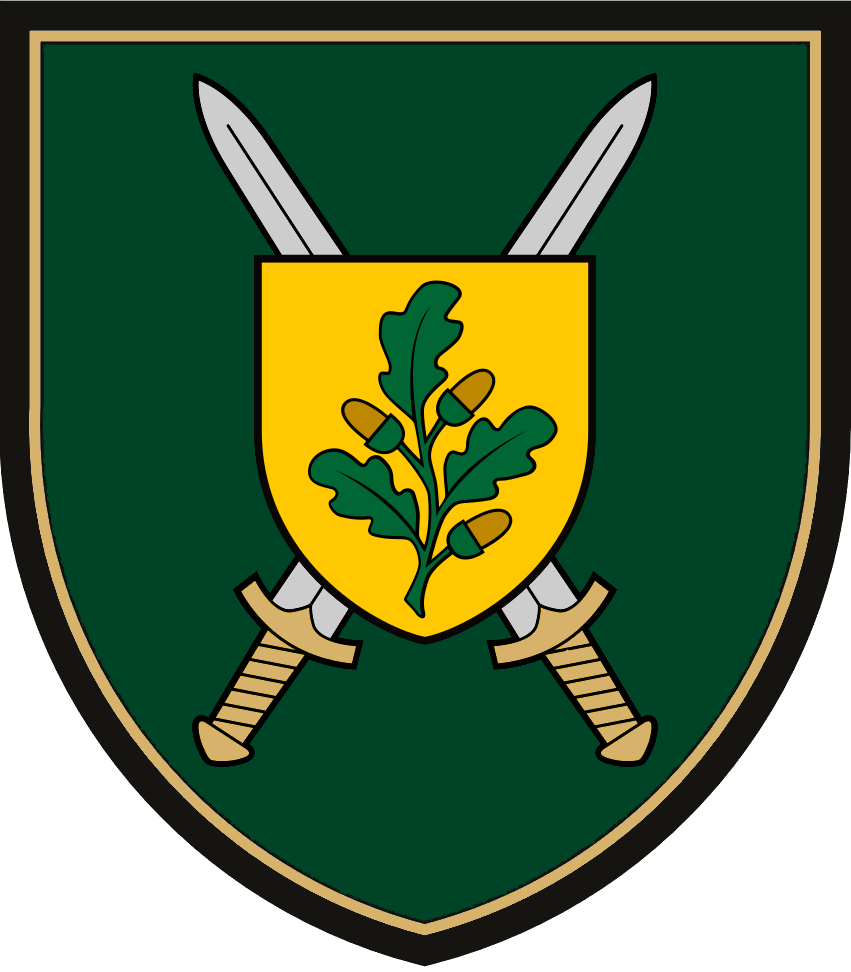
Lithuanian Land Forces Major Juozas Lukša Training Center

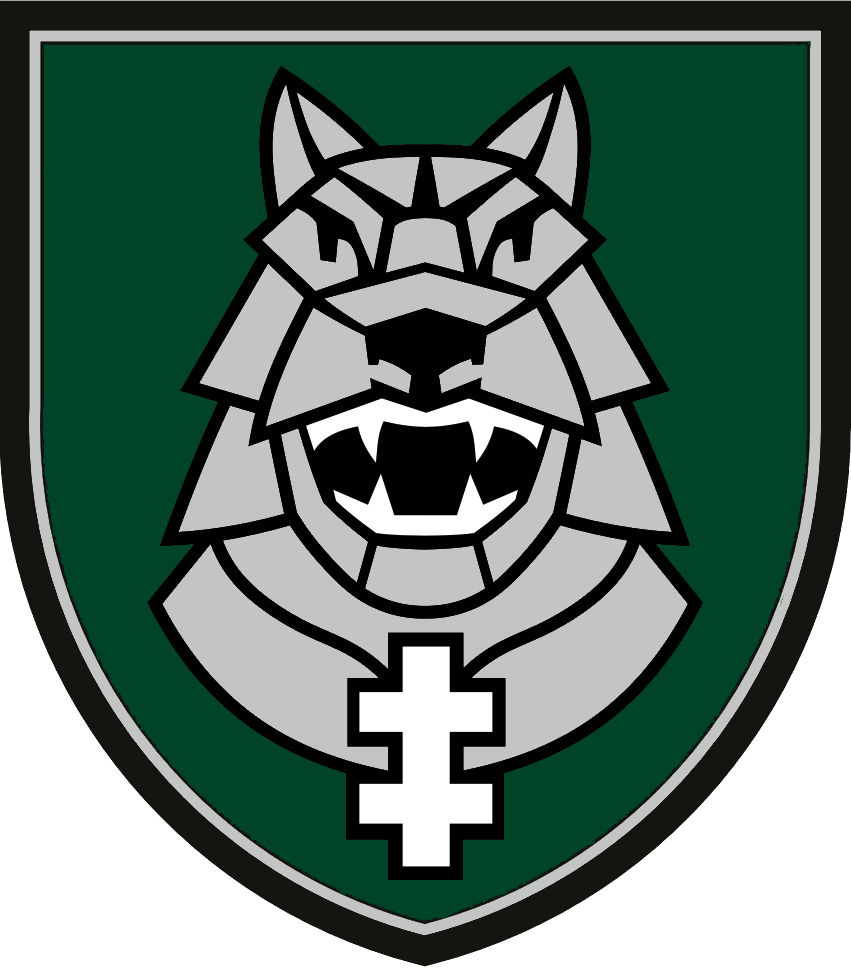
Infantry Brigade Iron Wolf

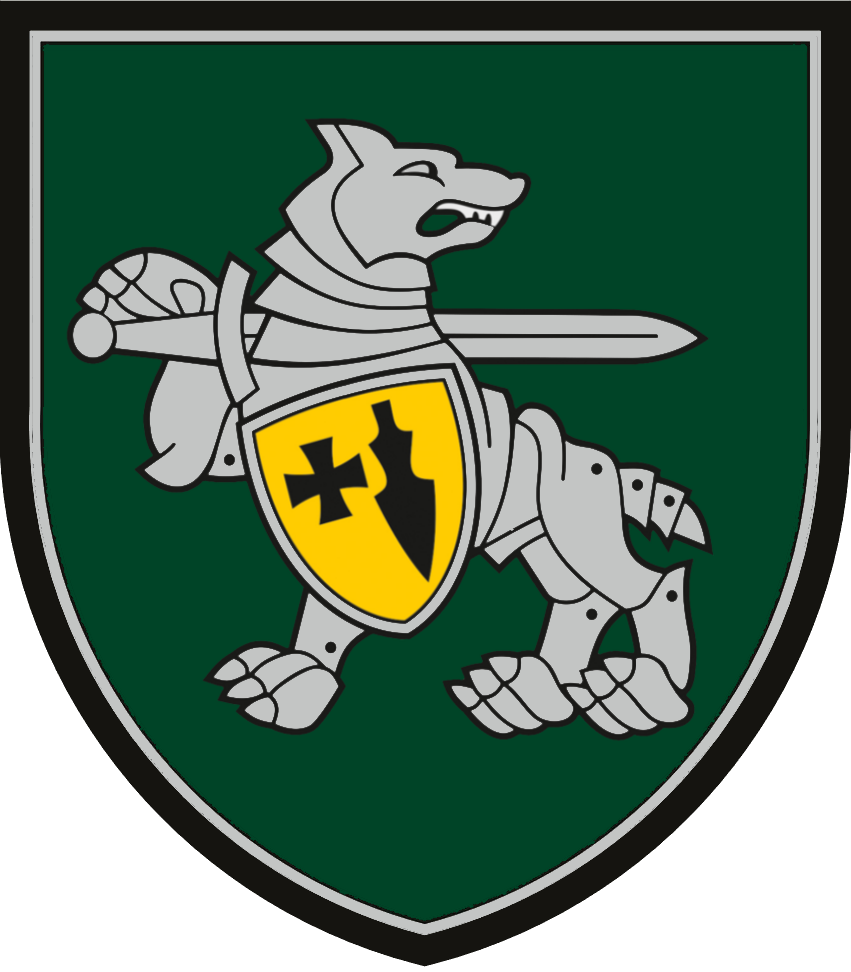
Grand Duke Algirdas Infantry Battalion

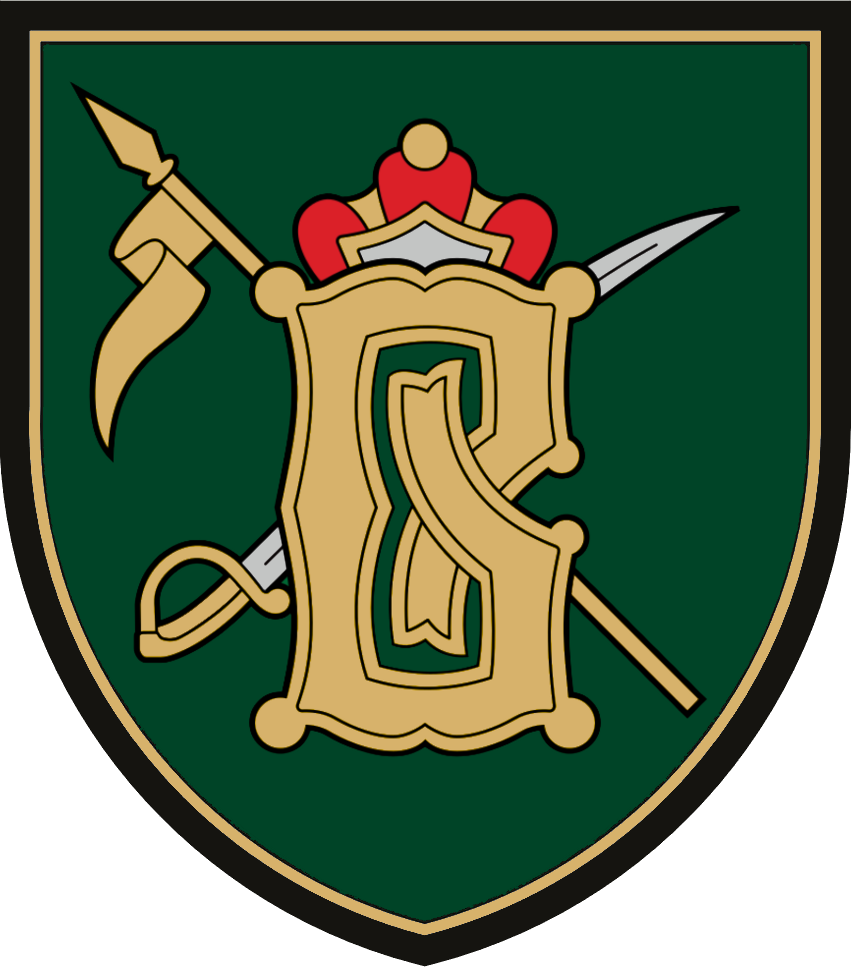
Grand Duchess Birutė Uhlan Battalion

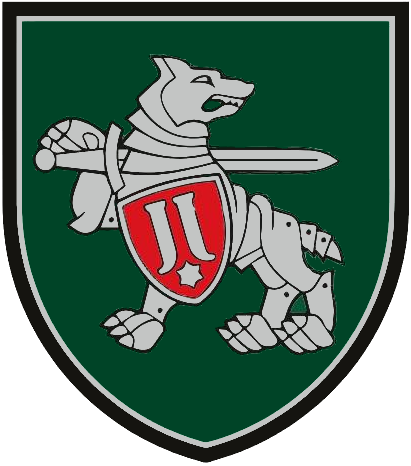
General Jokūbas Jasinskis Logistics Battalion

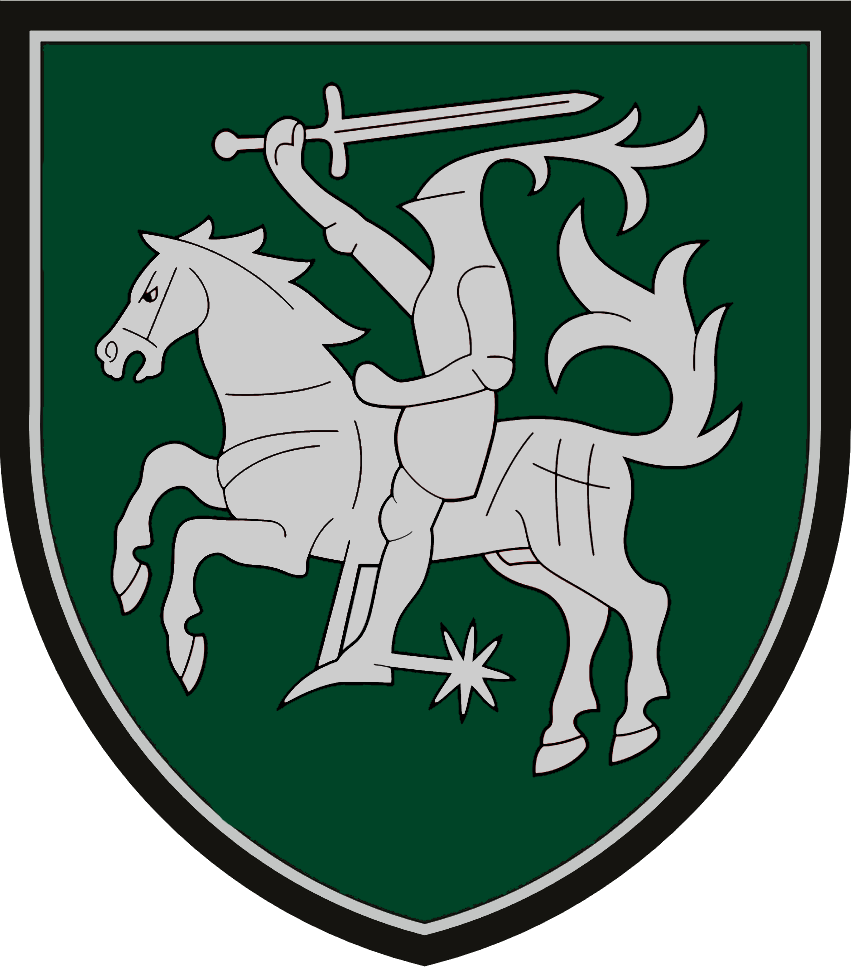
Infantry Brigade Aukštaitija

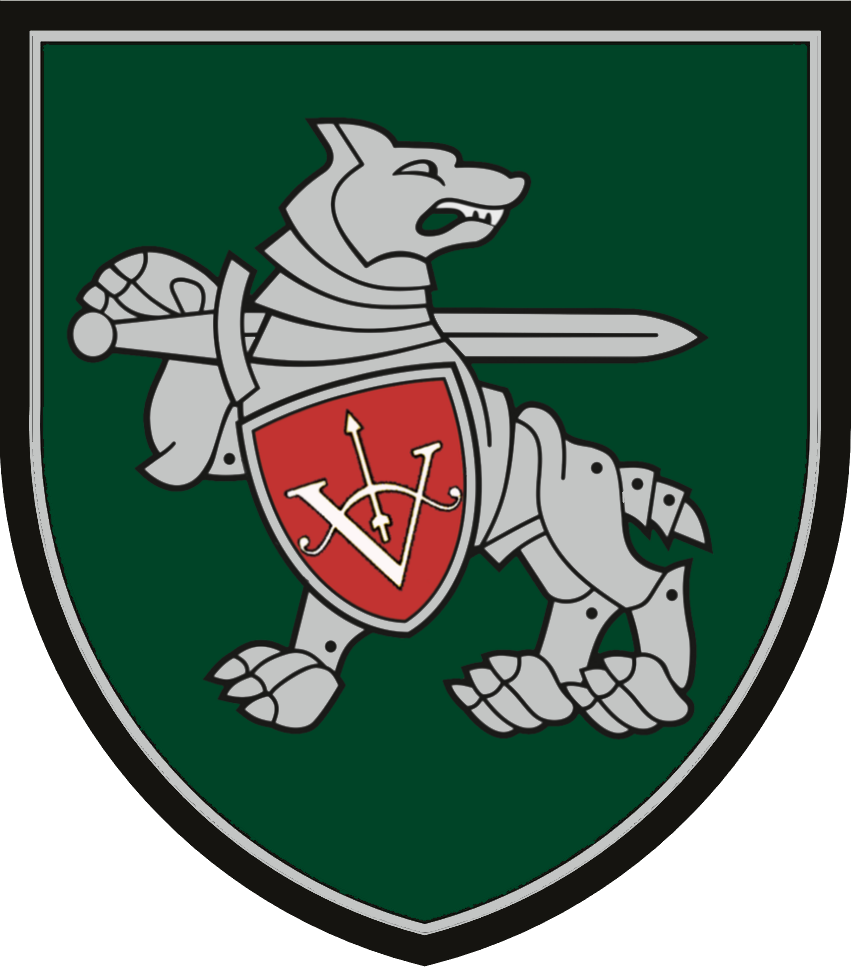
Duke Vaidotas Infantry Battalion

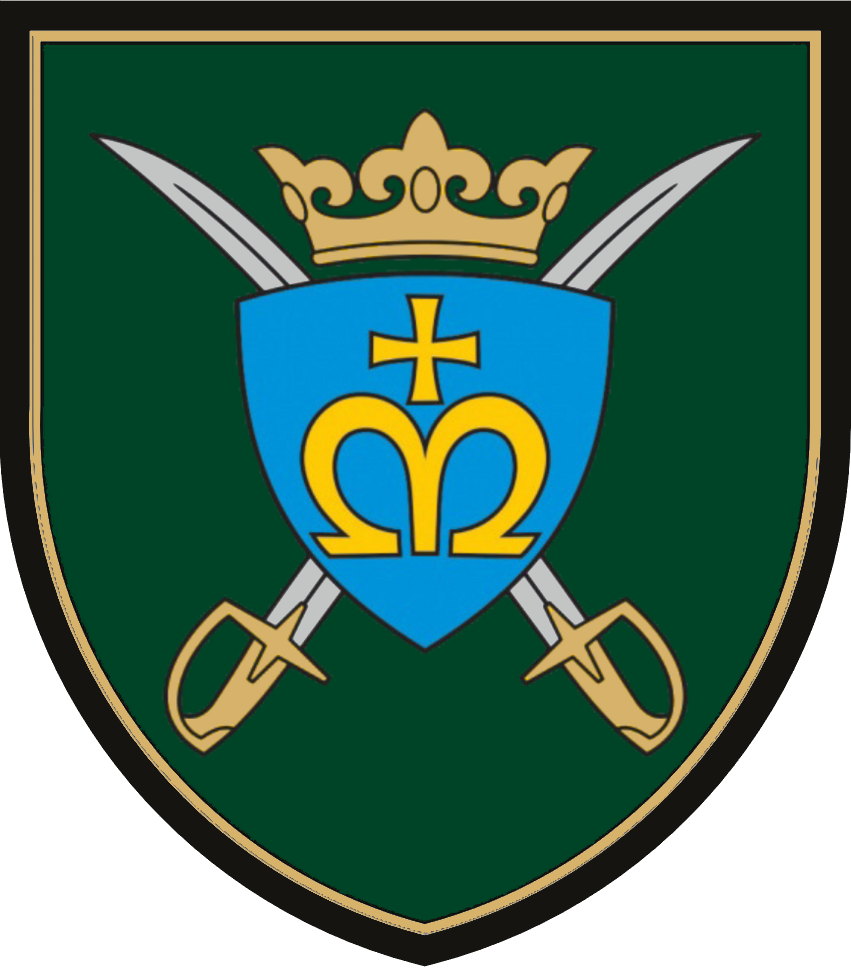
King Mindaugas Hussar Battalion

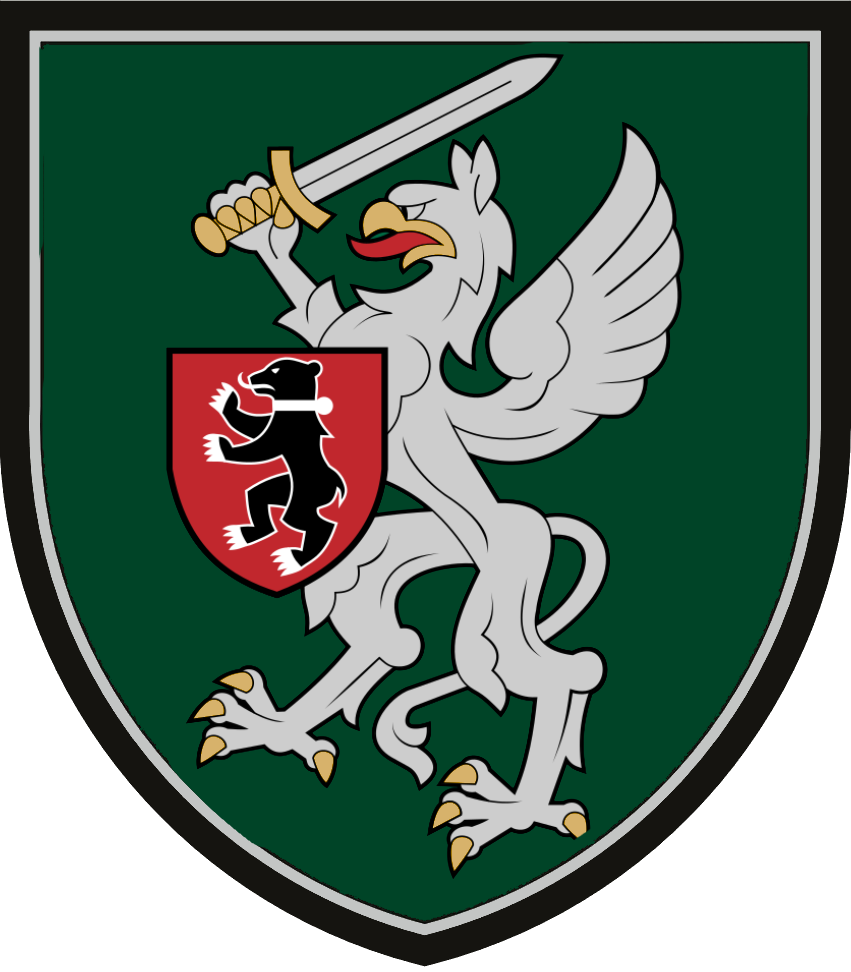
Samogitia Motorized Infantry Brigade

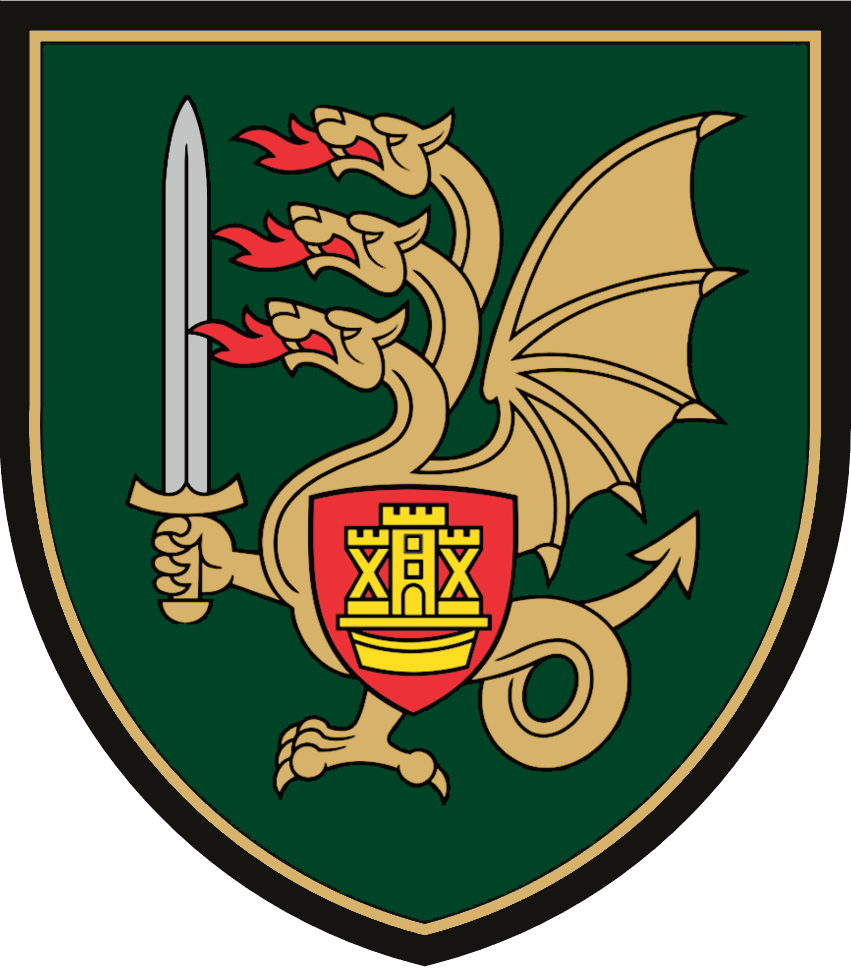
Grand Duke Butigeidis Dragoon Battalion

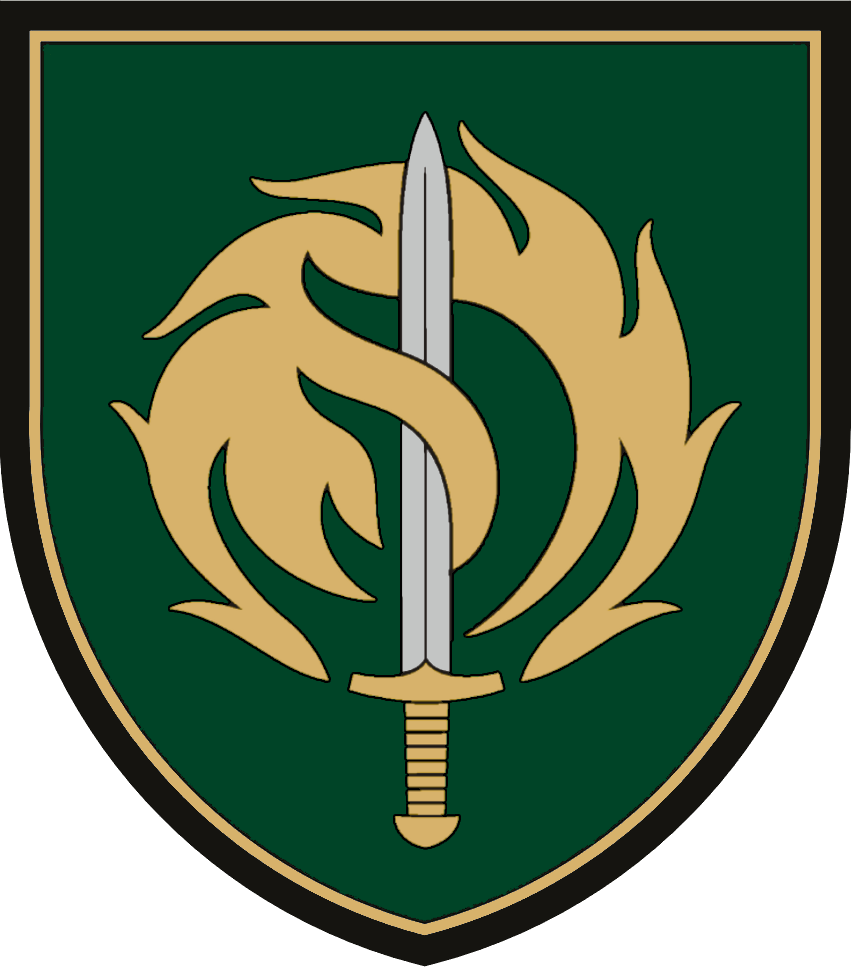
Prince Margiris Infantry Battalion

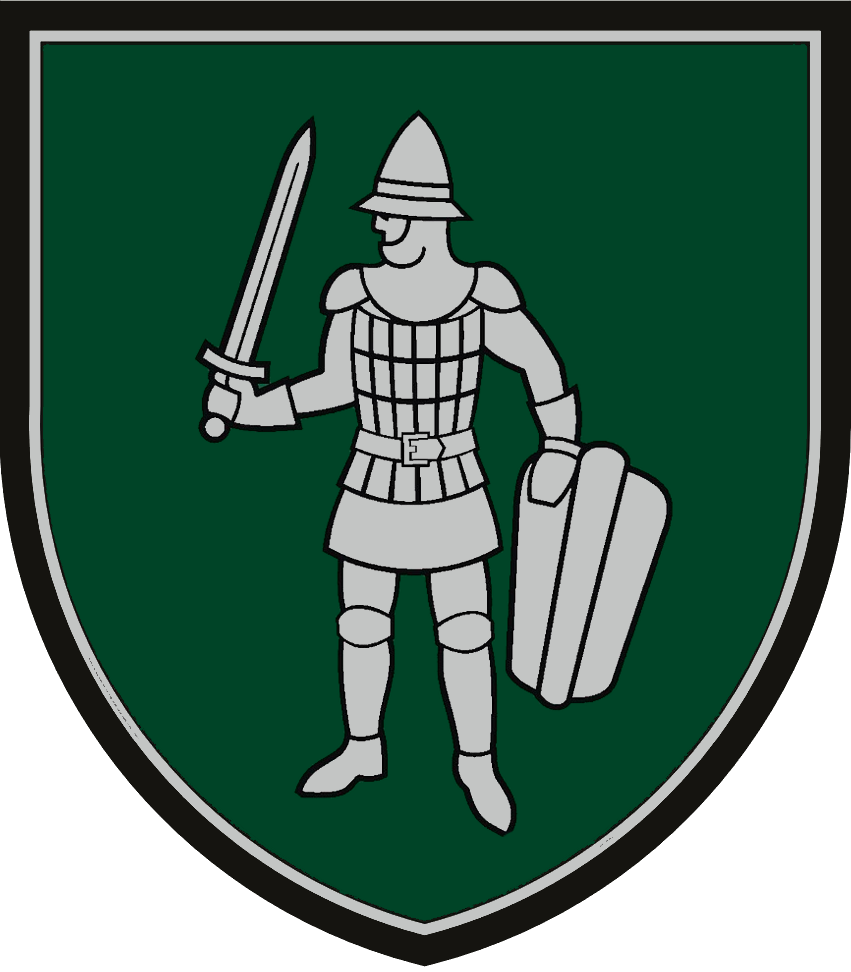
Grand Duke Kęstutis Infantry Battalion

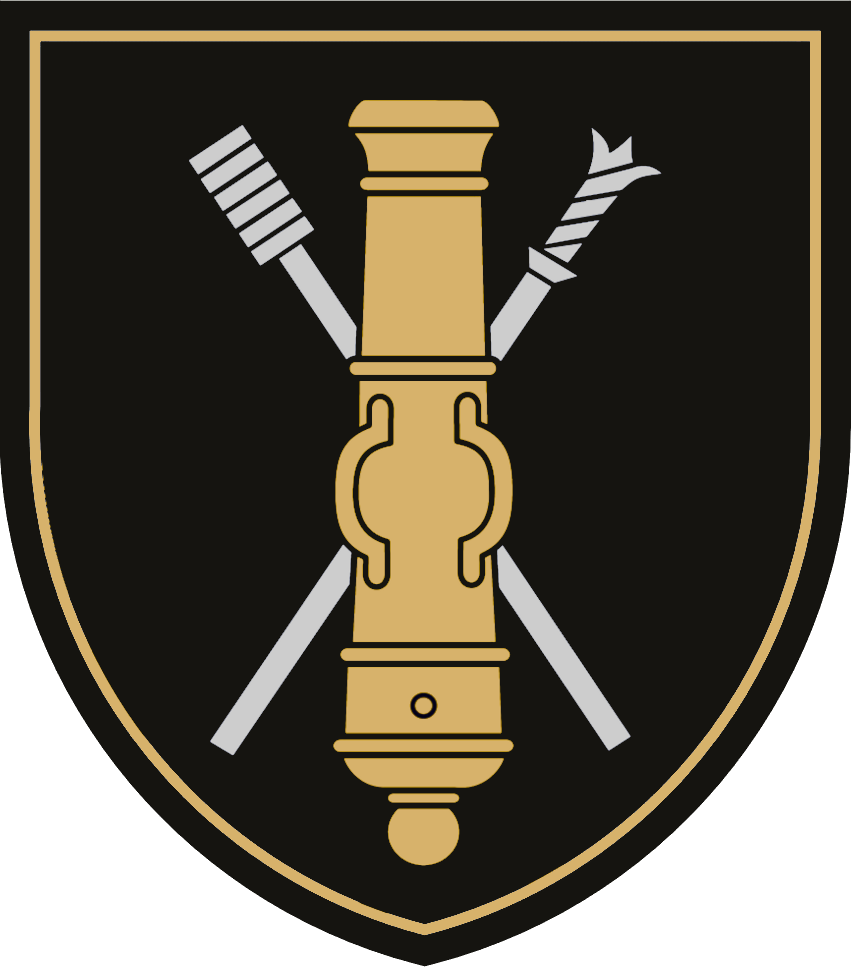
General Romualdas Giedraitis Artillery Battalion

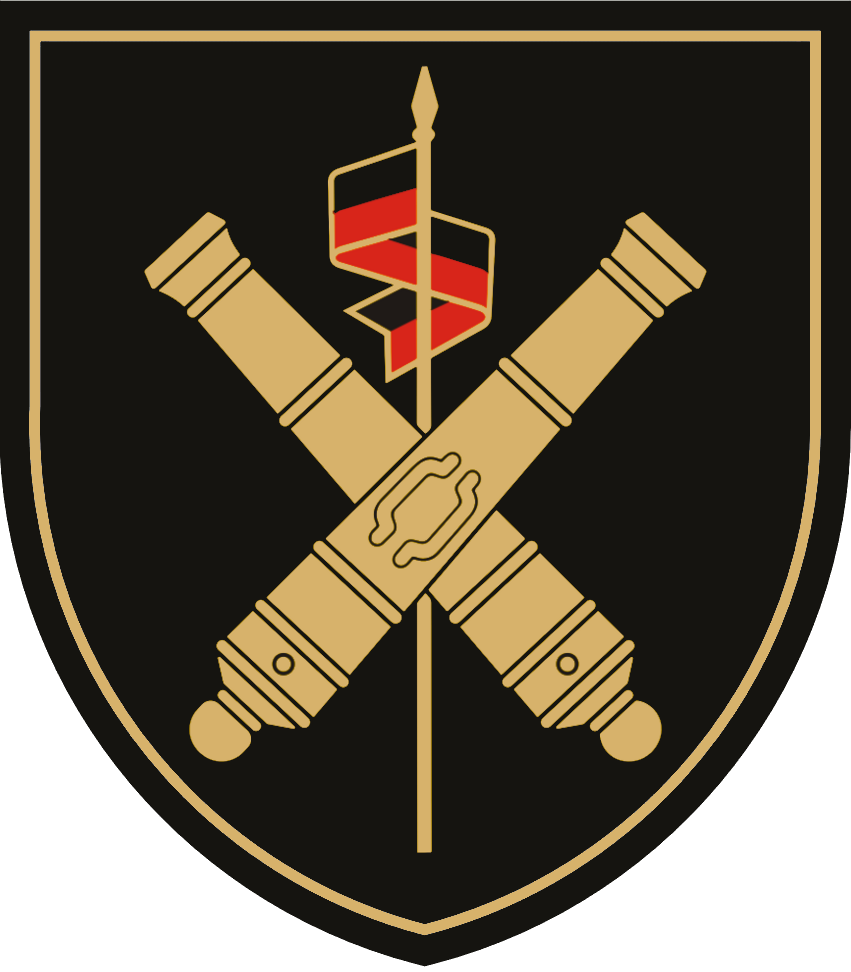
Brigadier General Motiejus Pečiulionis Artillery Battalion

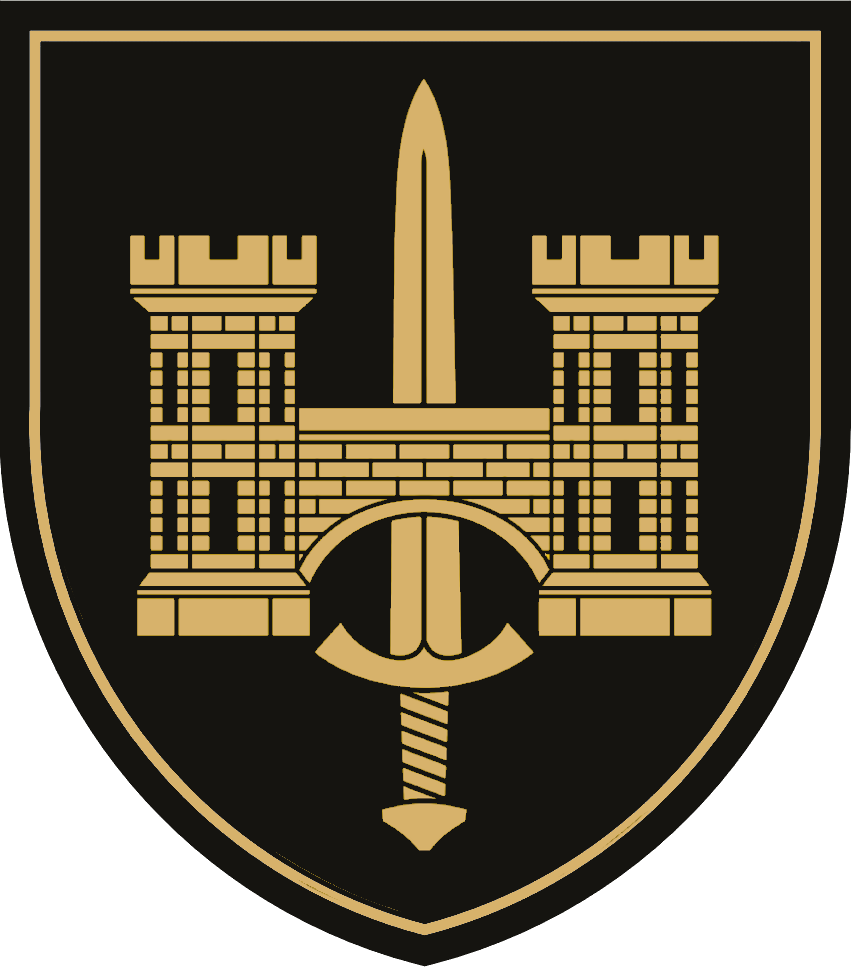
Colonel Juozas Vitkus Engineer Battalion

=== Lithuanian Naval Forces ===
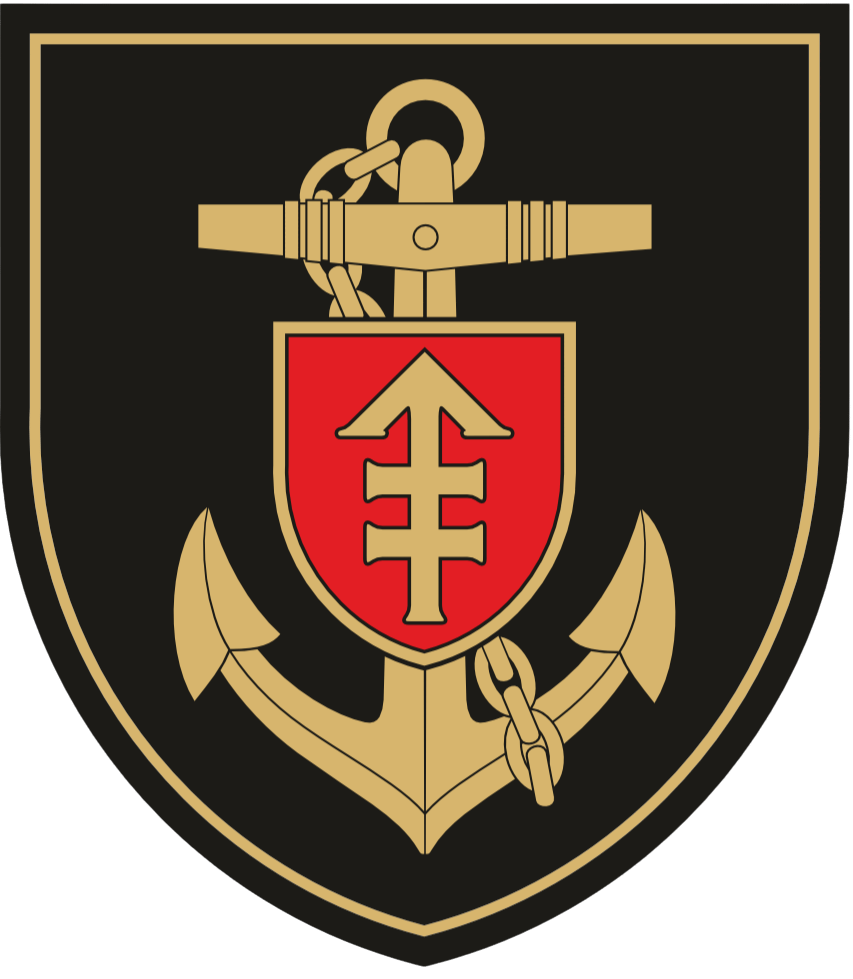
General Kazimieras Nestoras Sapiega Fusillier Battalion

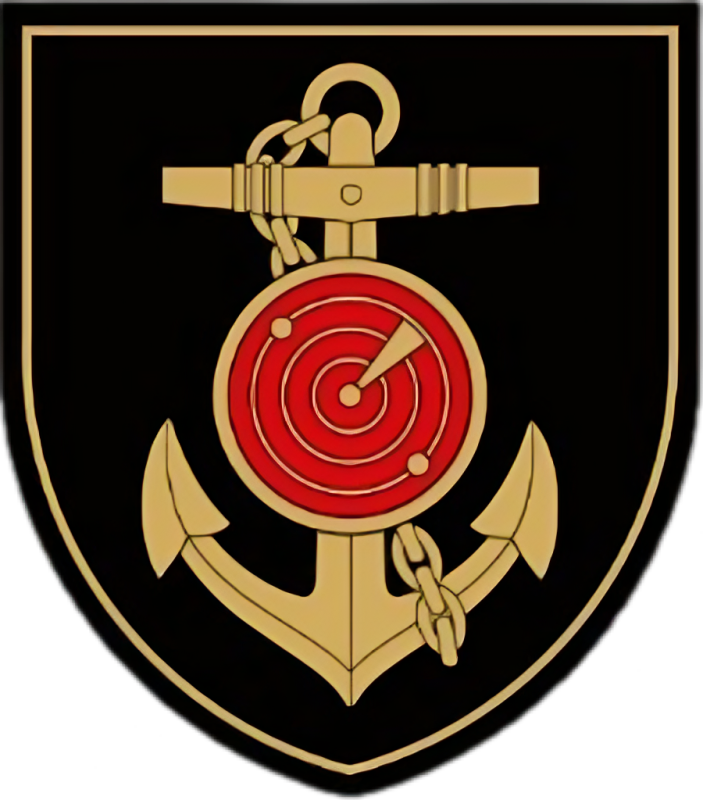
Sea Coastal Surveillance Service

=== Lithuanian Air Forces ===
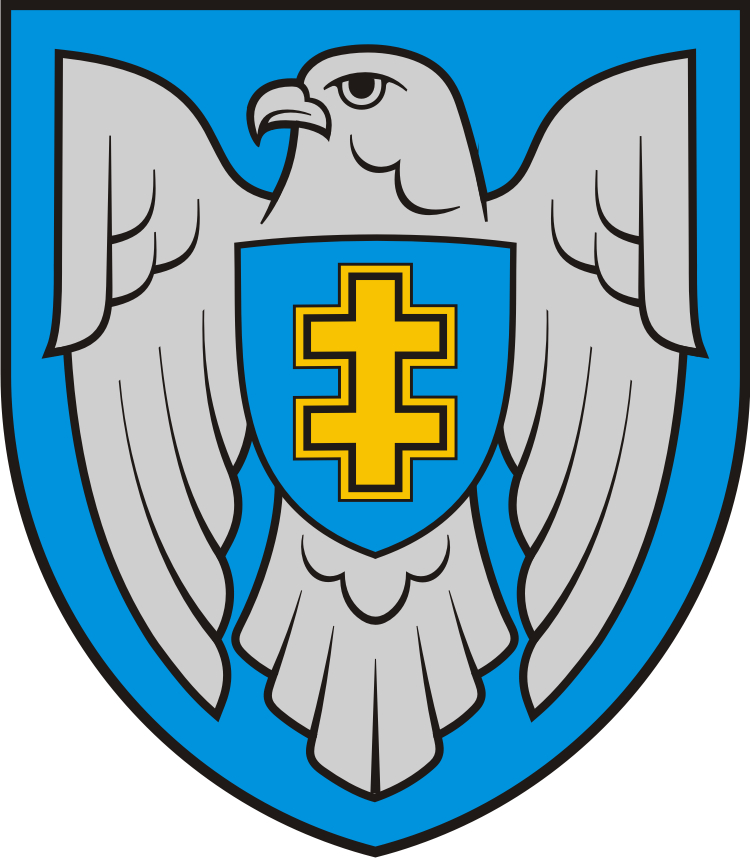
Air Force Air Base

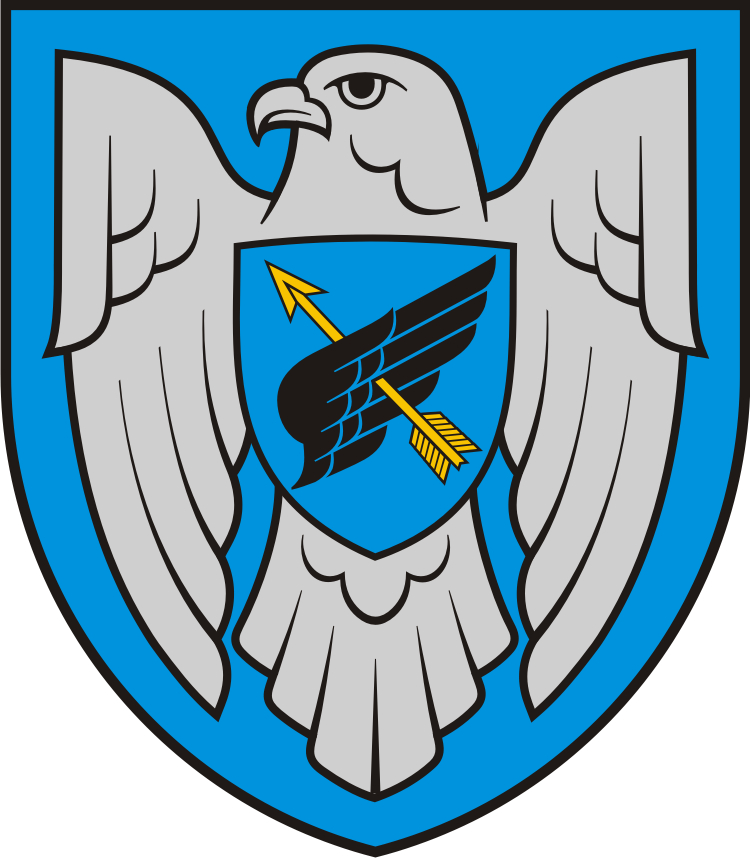
Air Defence Battalion

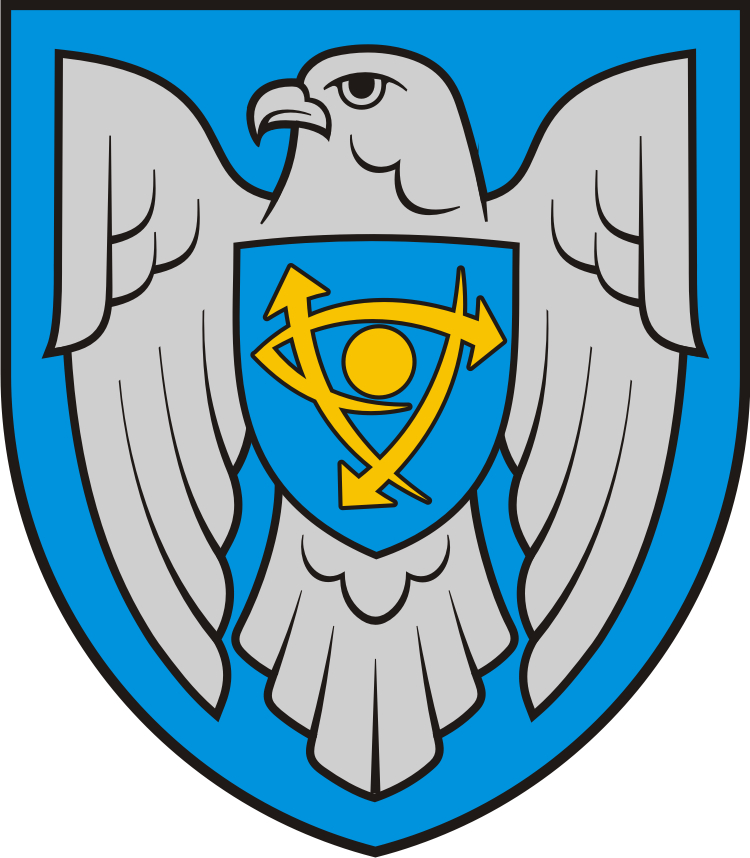
Airspace Surveillance and Control Command

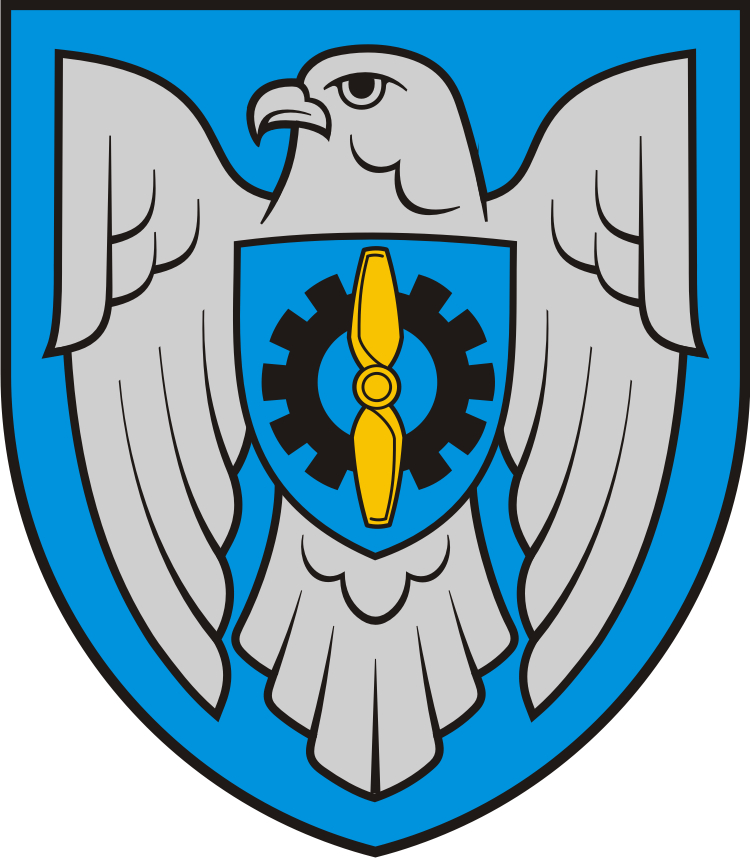
Air Force Armament and Equipment Repair Depot Service

=== Lithuanian Special Operations Forces ===
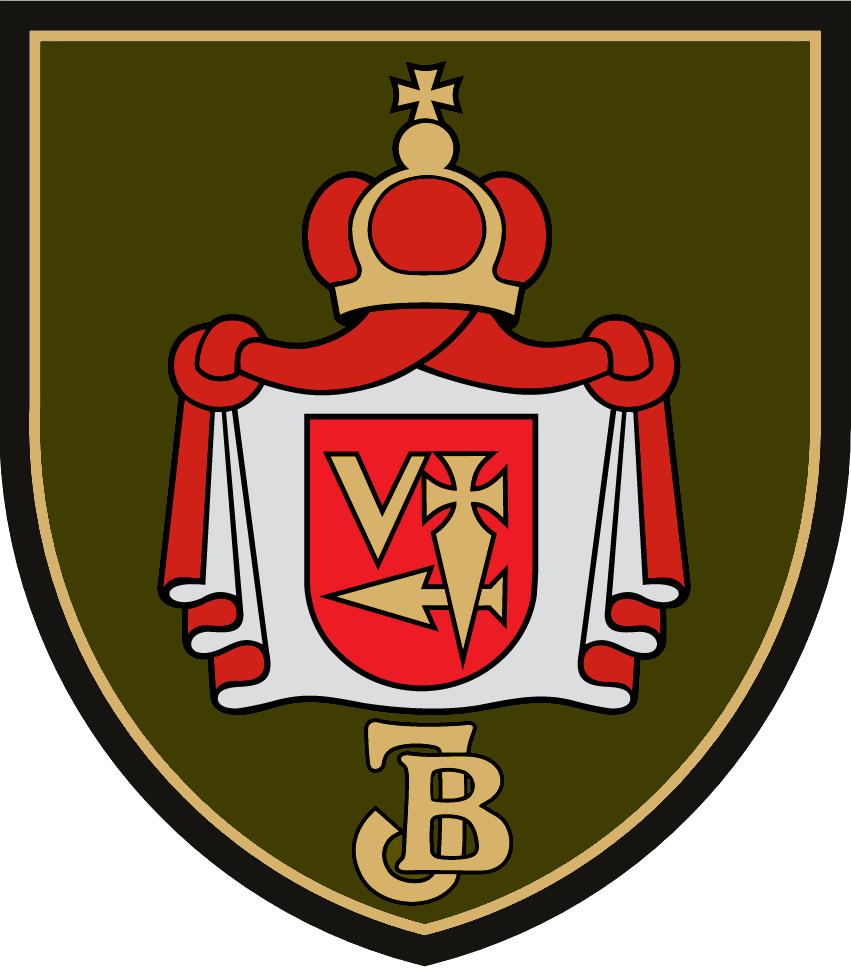
Vytautas the Great Jaeger Battalion

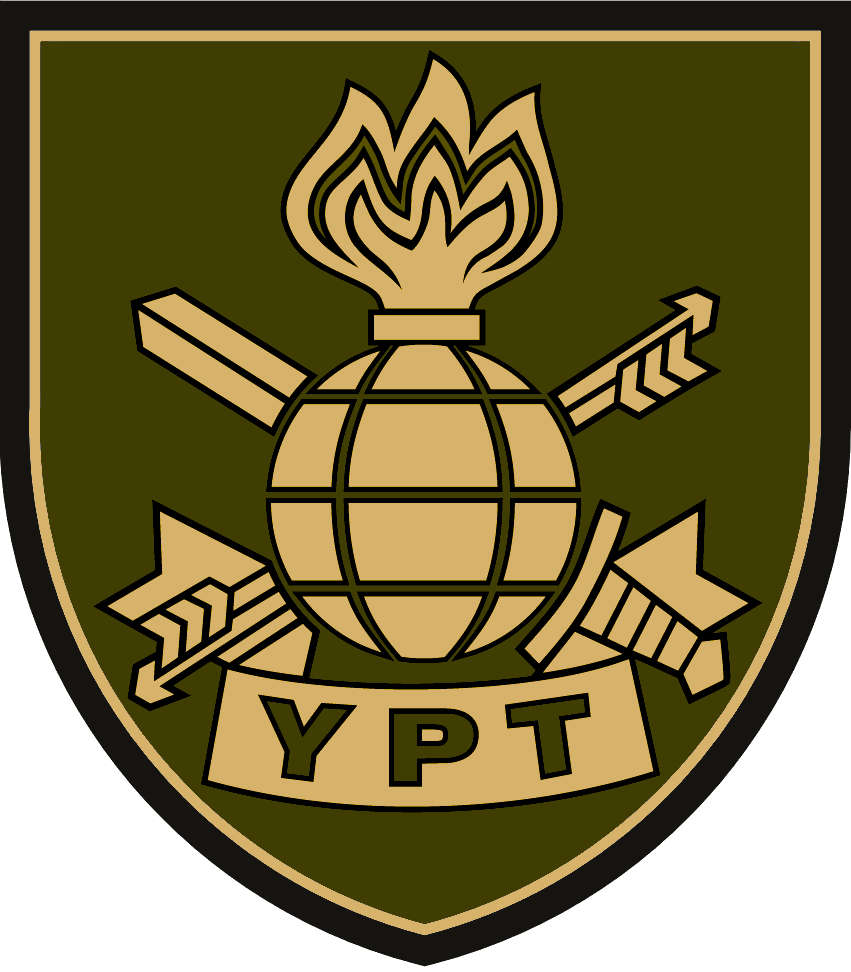
Special Mission Unit

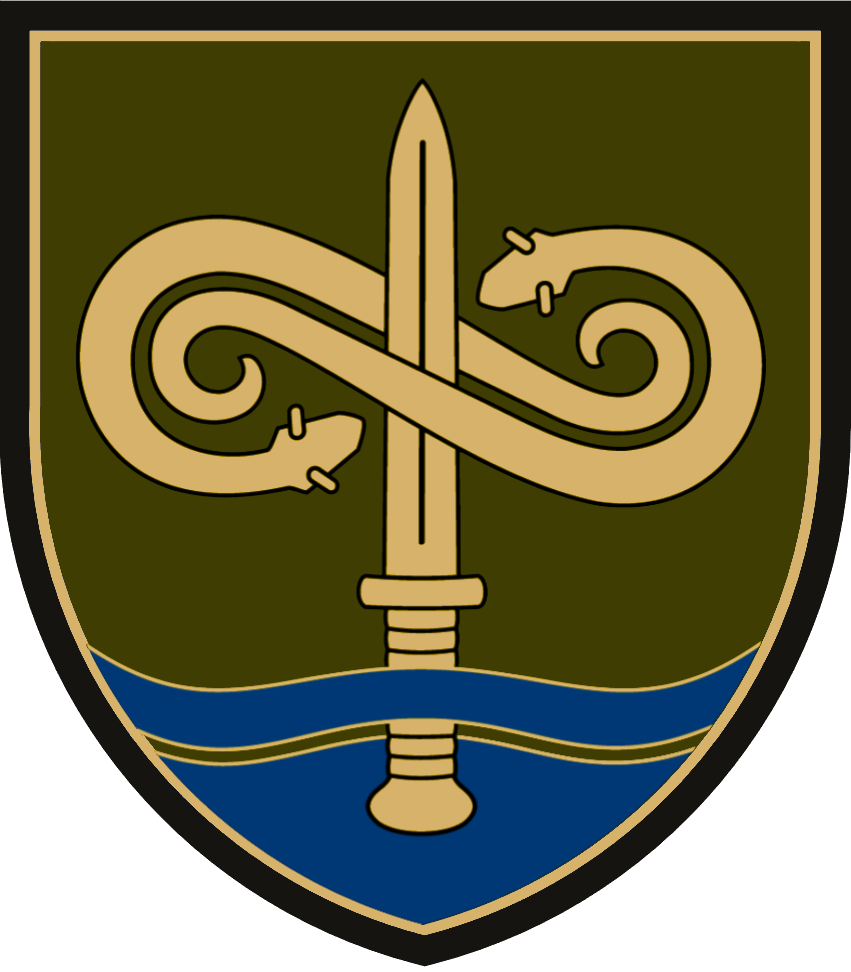
Combat Divers Service

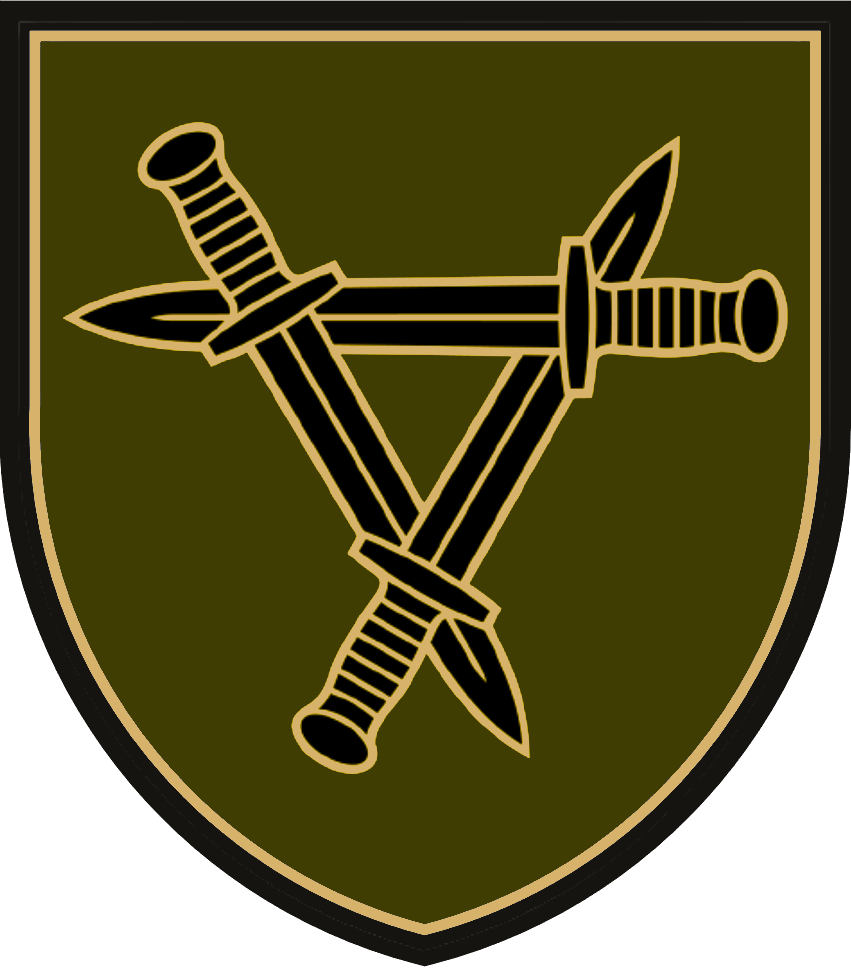
Training and Combat Support Center

=== Lithuanian Logistics Command ===
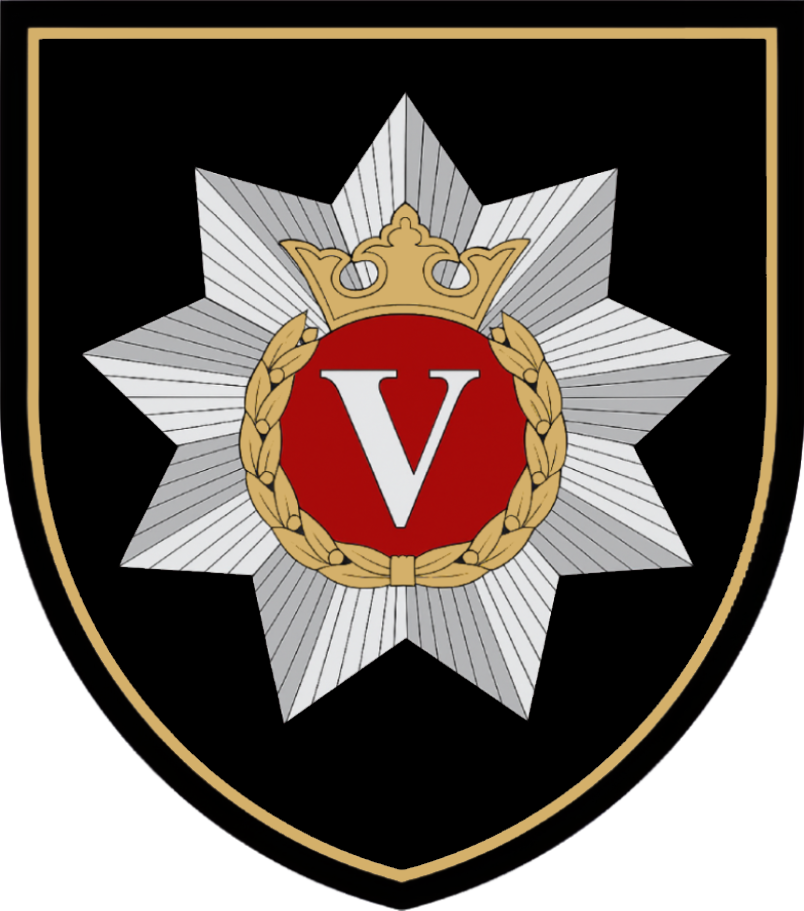
Grand Duke Vytenis General Support Battalion

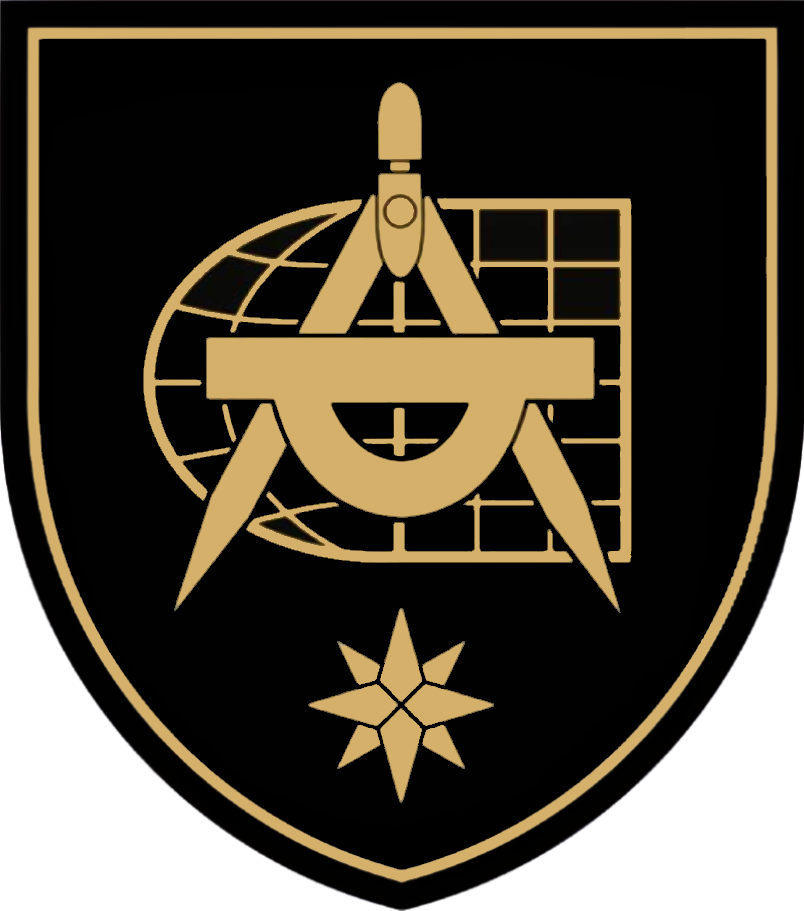
Military Mapping Centre

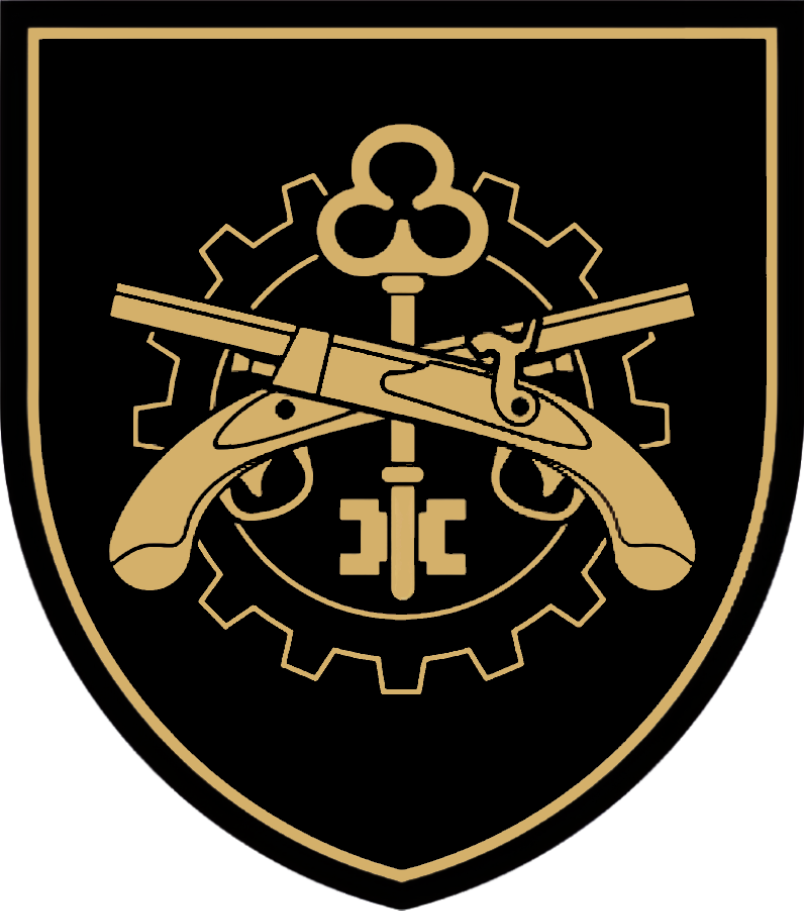
Divisional general Jonas Sutkus Depot Service

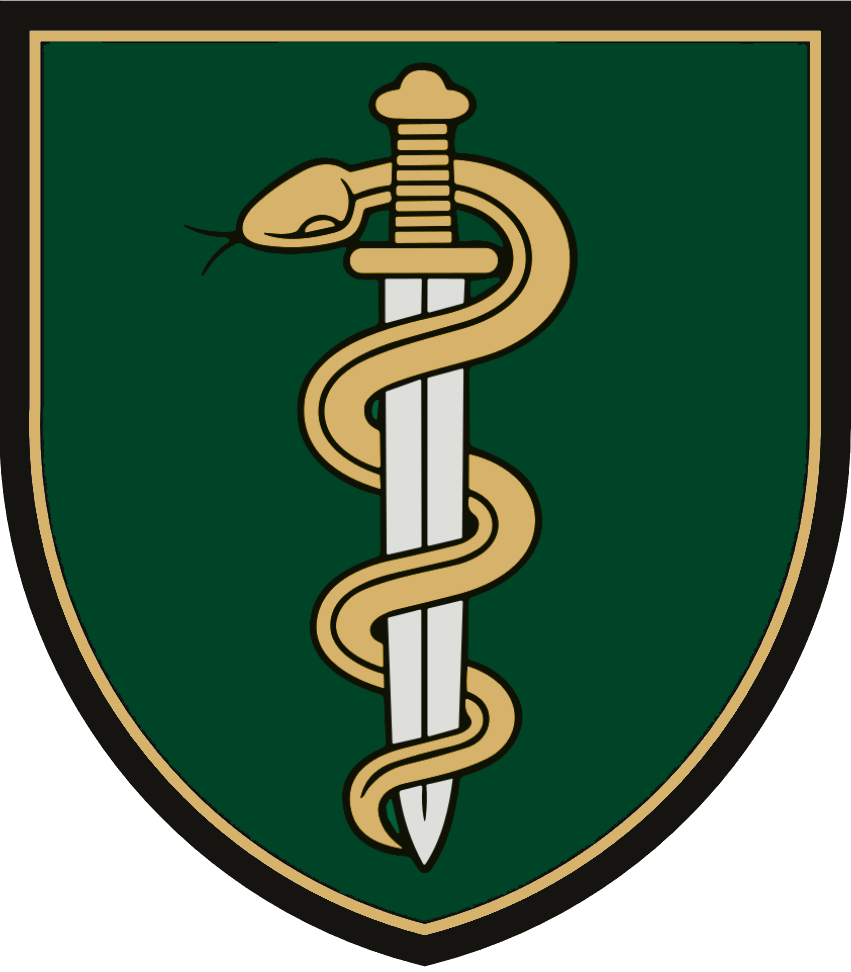
Doctor Jonas Basanavičius Military Medical Service

=== Lithuanian Training and Doctrine Command ===
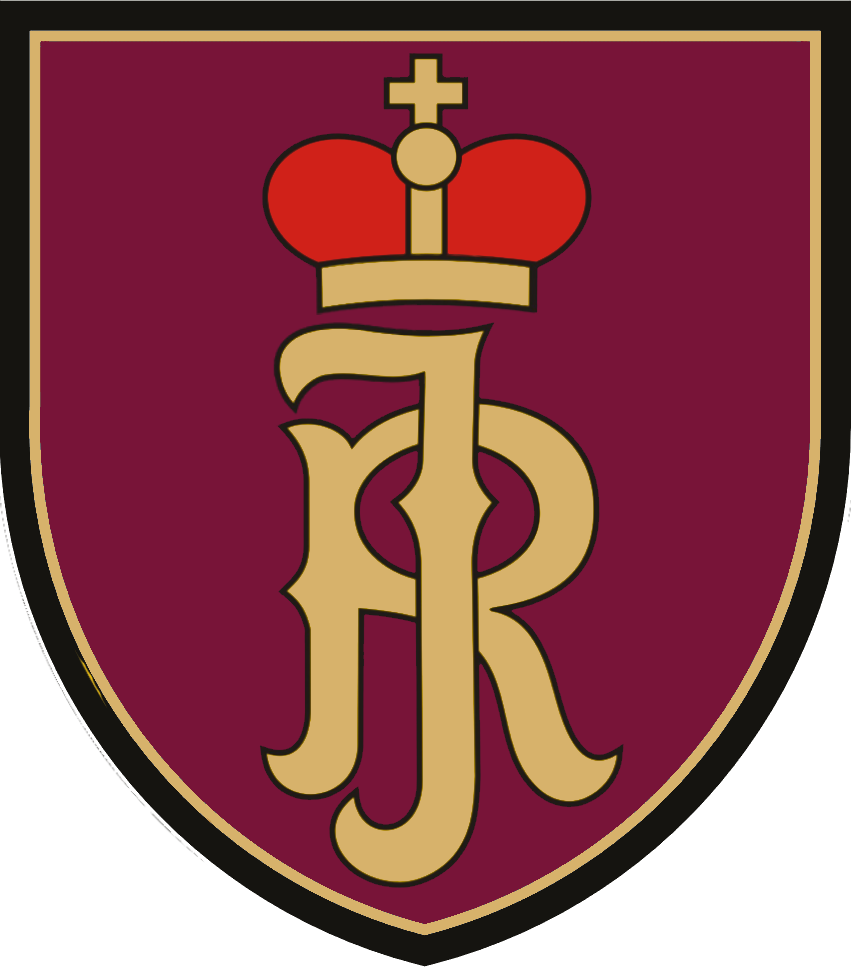
The training regiment of the Great Hetman of Lithuania Jonušas Radvila

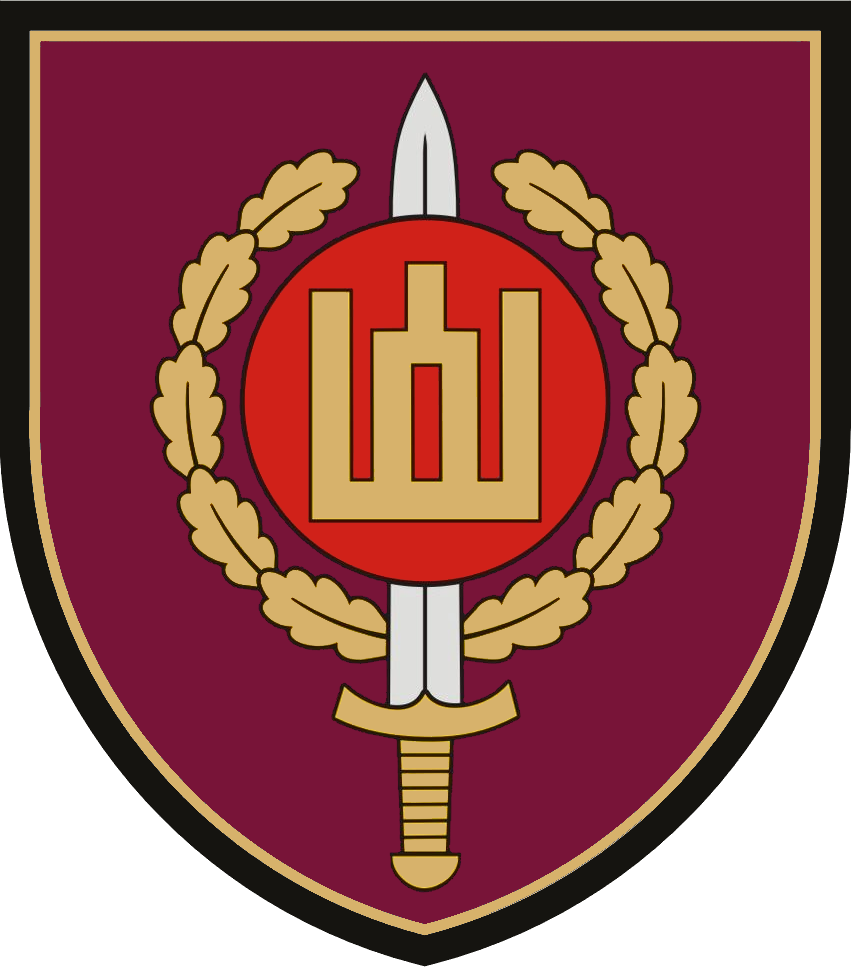
General Stasys Raštikis Lithuanian Armed Forces School

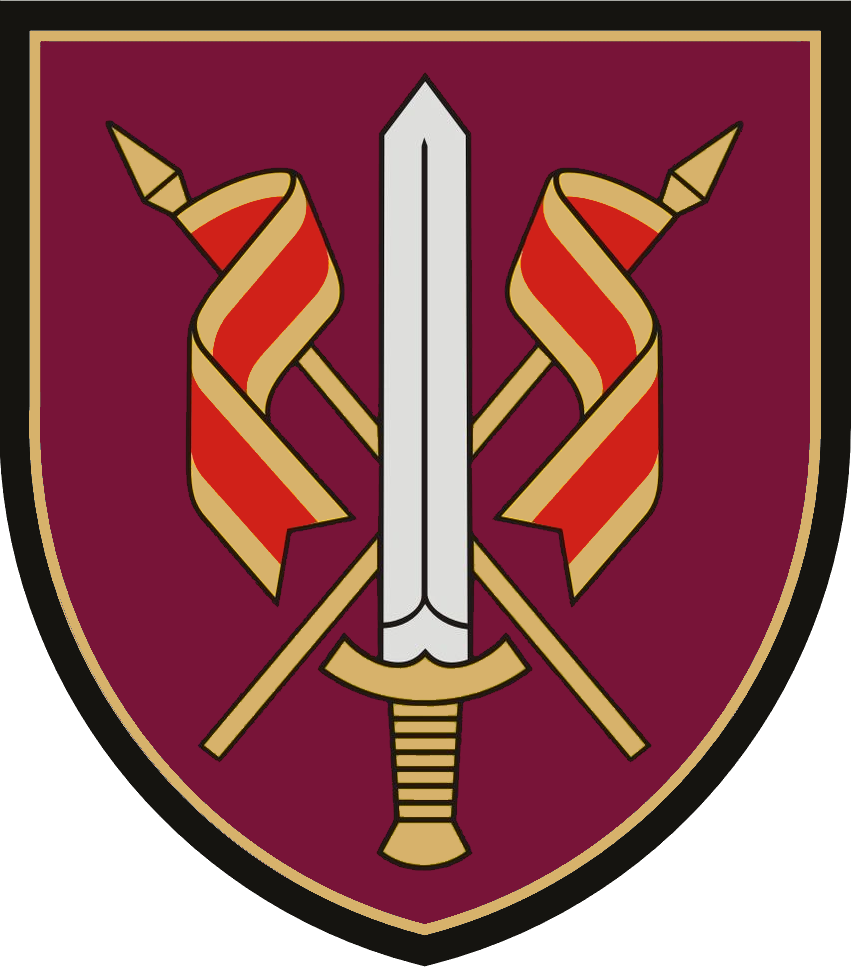
General Adolfas Ramanauskas Warfare Training Centre

=== Lithuanian Cyber Defence Command ===
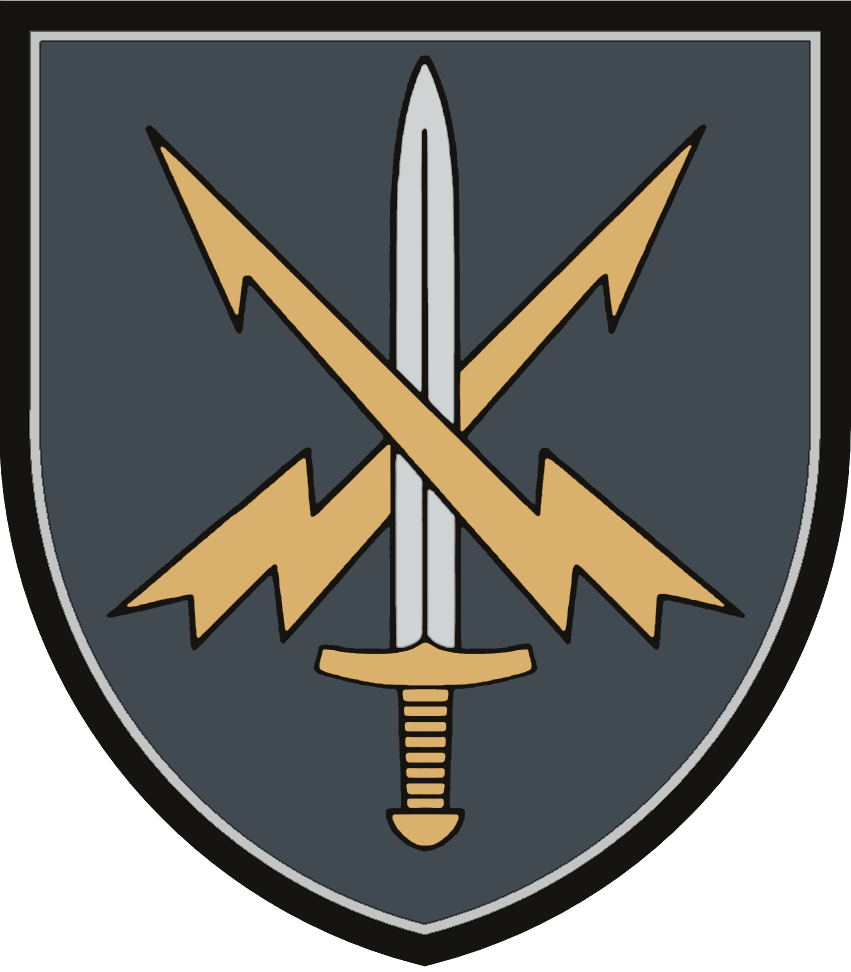
Grand Lithuanian Hetman Kristupas Radvila Perkūnas Communications and Information Systems Battalion

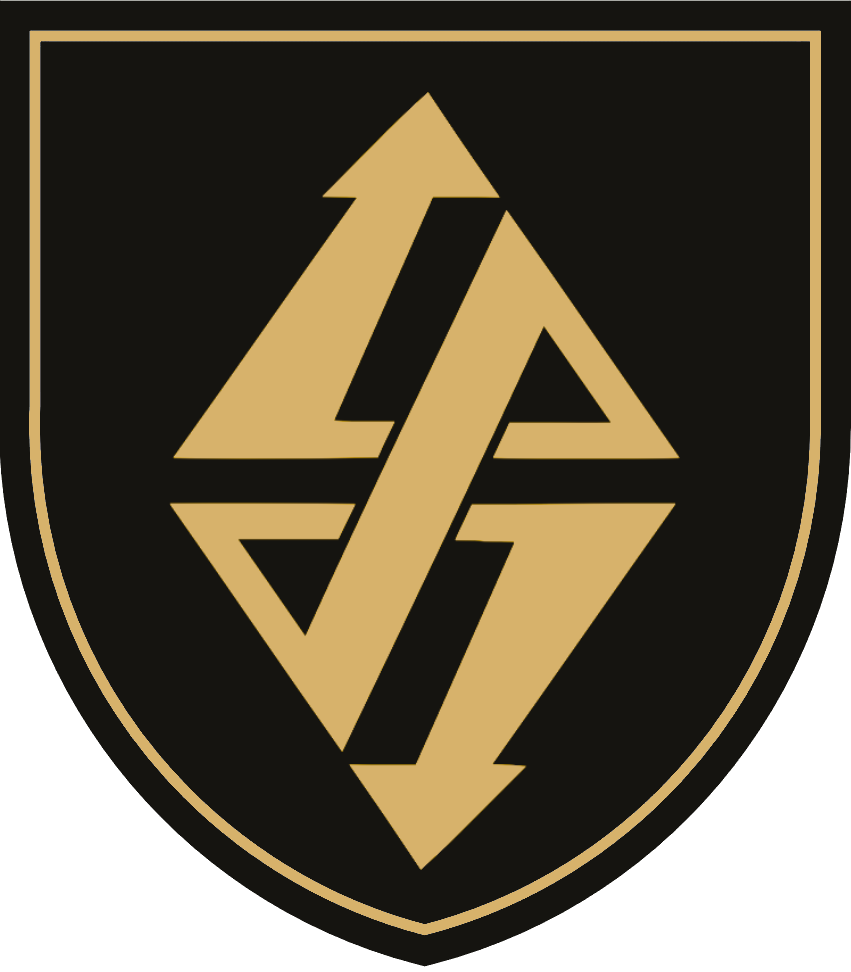
Information Systems Service

=== Lithuanian Riflemen's Union ===
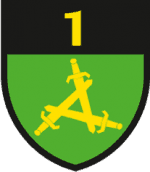
Officer Antanas Juozapavičius 1st Territorial Riflemen Unit

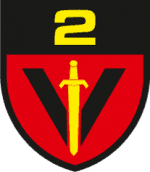
Vytautas the Great 2nd Territorial Riflemen Unit

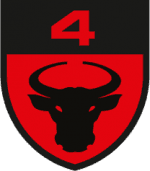
Suvalkija 4th Territorial Riflemen Unit

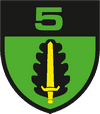
Alfonsas Smetona 5th Territorial Riflemen Unit

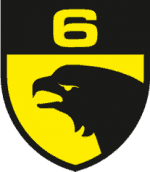
Povilas Plechavičius 6th Territorial Riflemen Unit

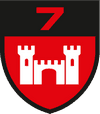
Kęstutis 7th Territorial Riflemen Unit

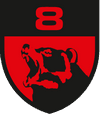
Samogitia 8th Territorial Riflemen Unit

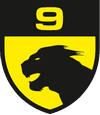
Pranas Saladžius 9th Territorial Riflemen Unit

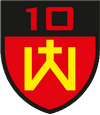
King Mindaugas 10th Territorial Riflemen Unit

=== Public Security Service of Lithuania ===
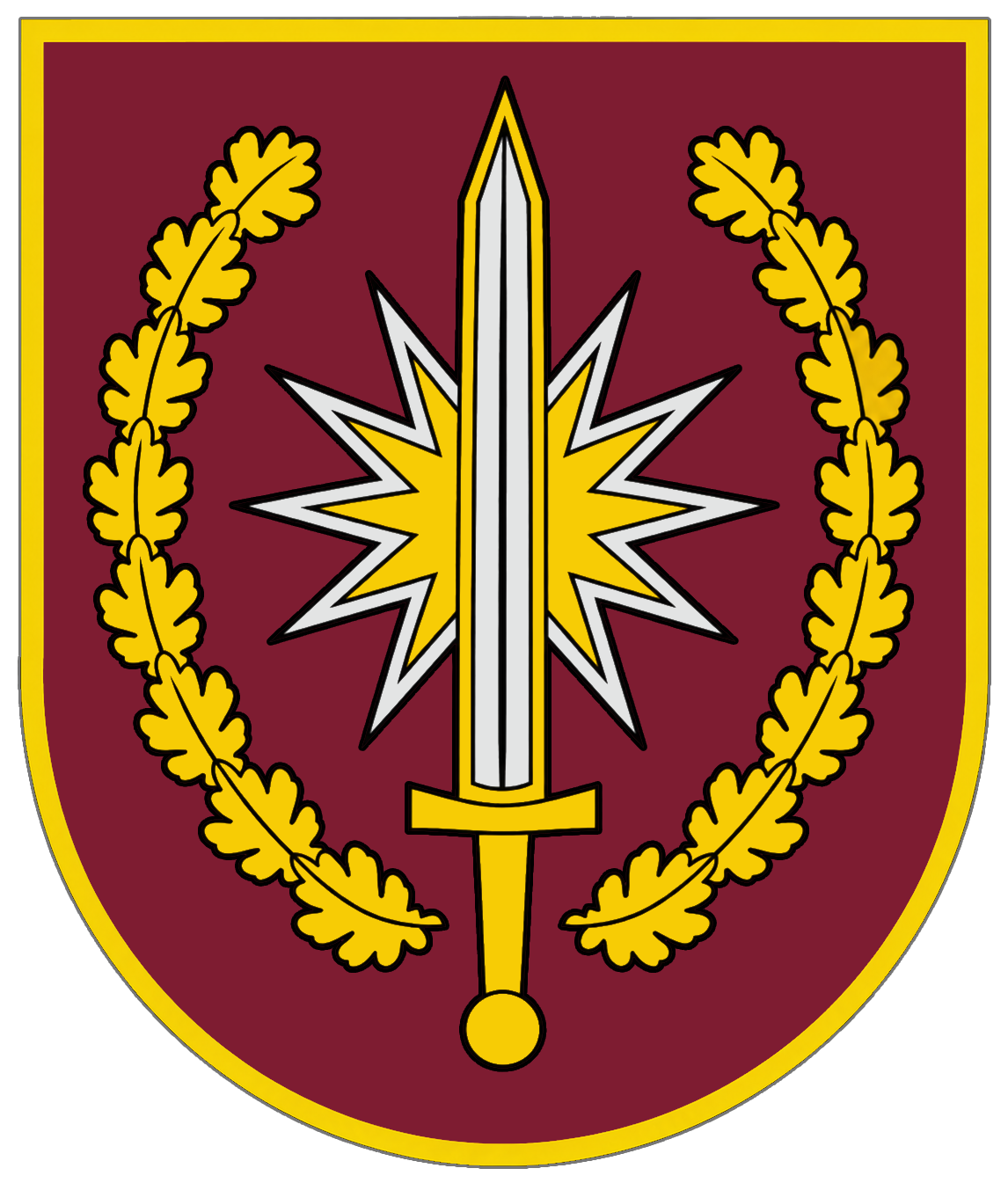
Staff Unit

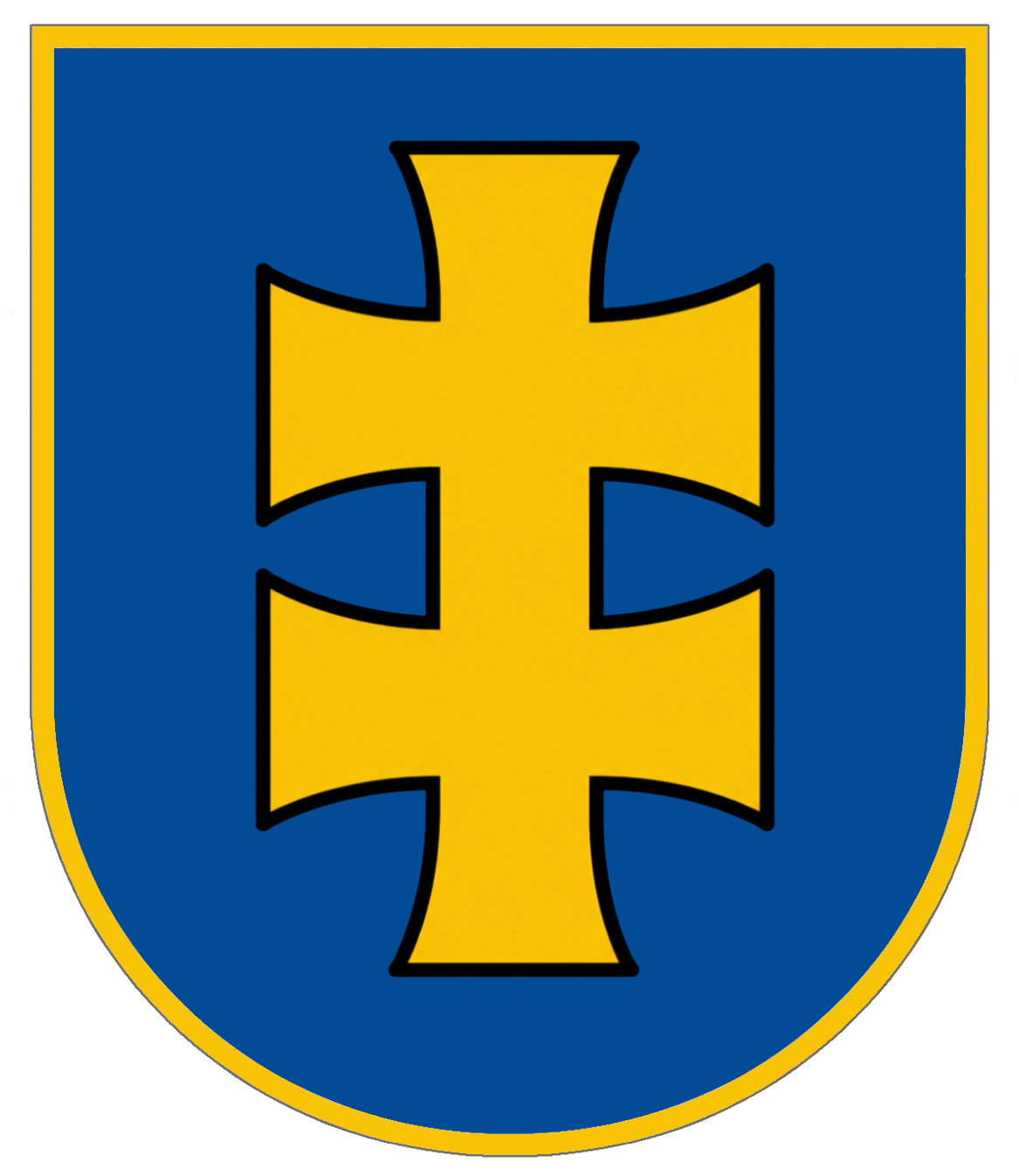
Vilnius Unit

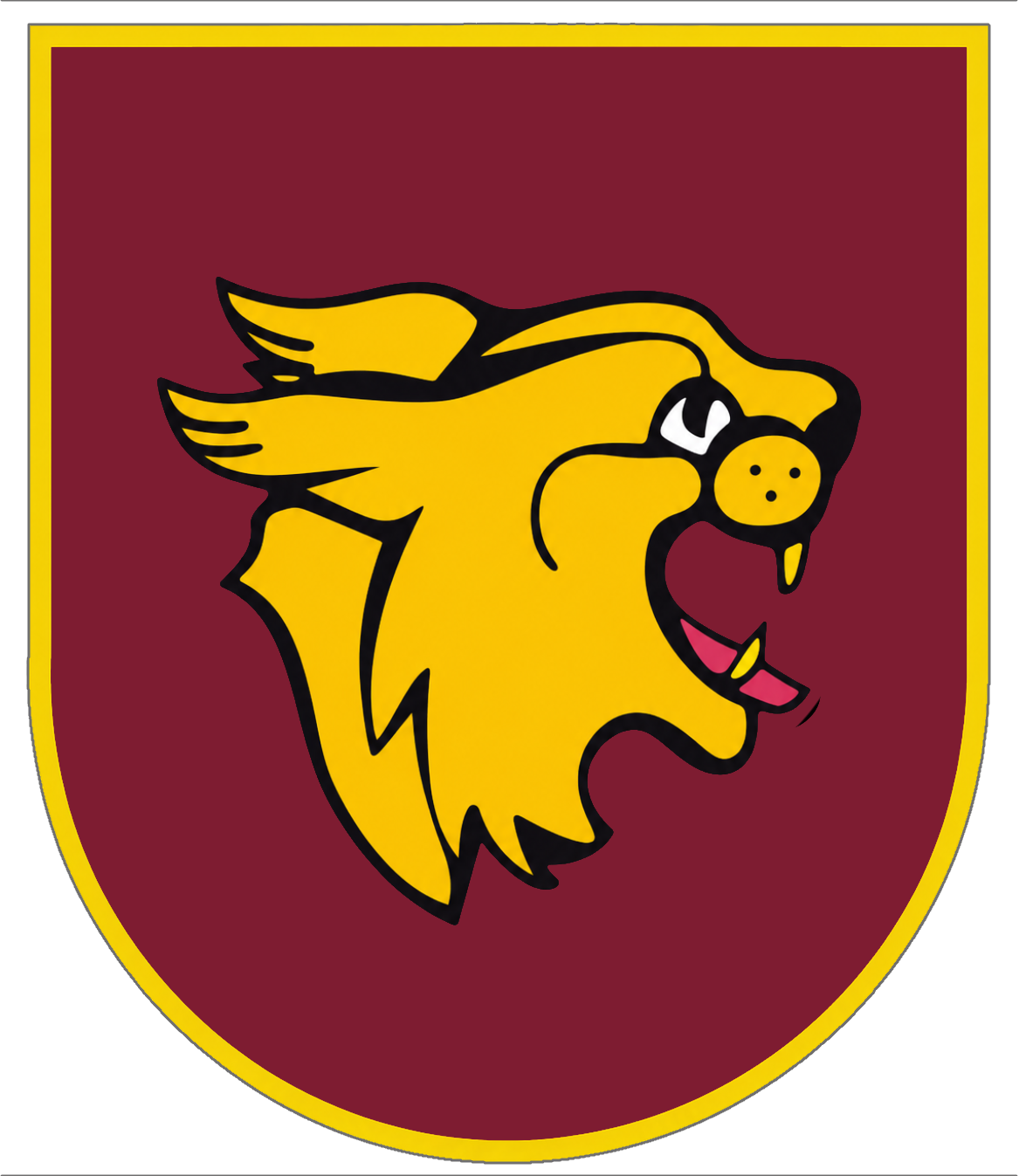
Kaunas Unit

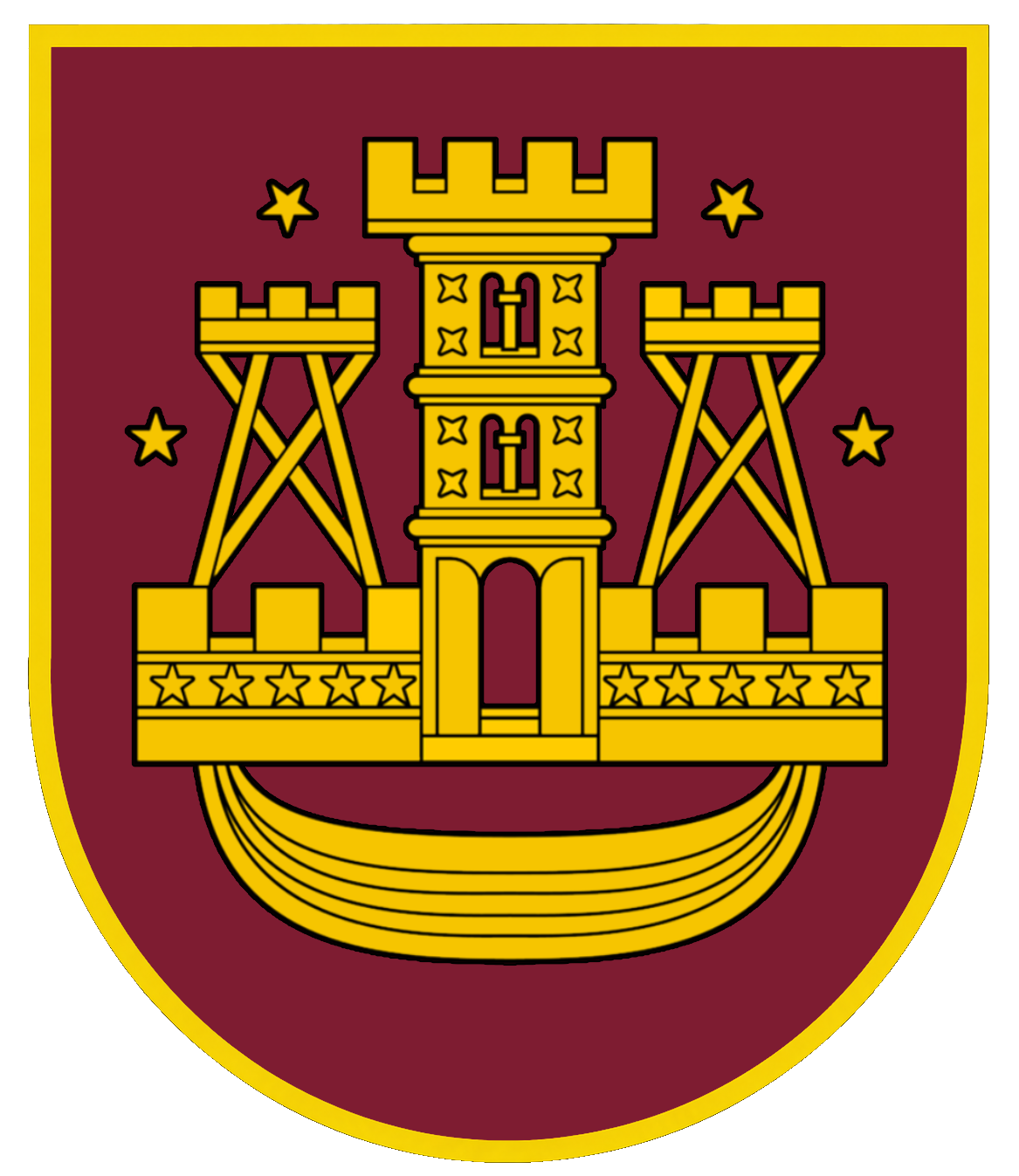
Klaipėda Unit

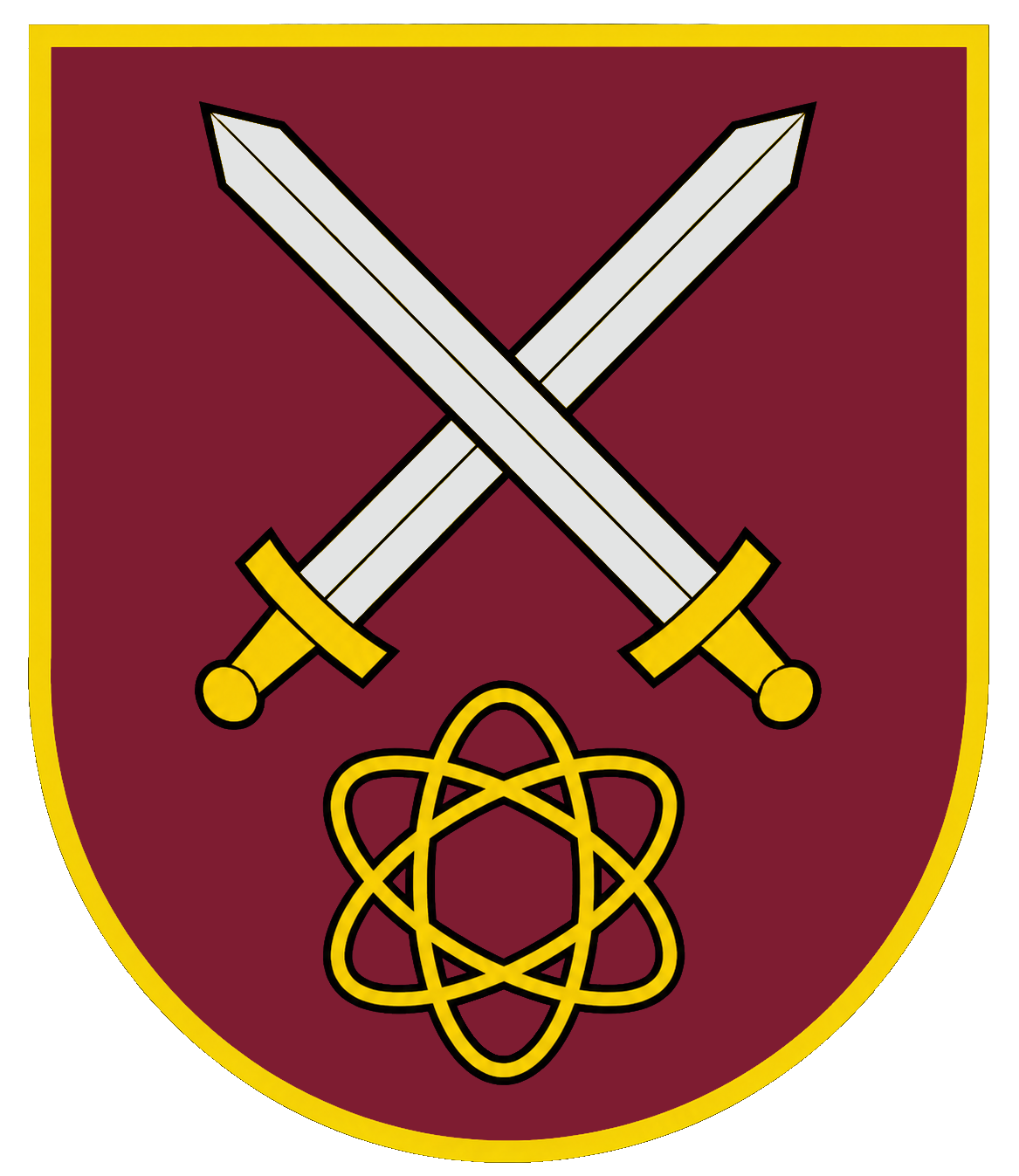
Visaginas Unit

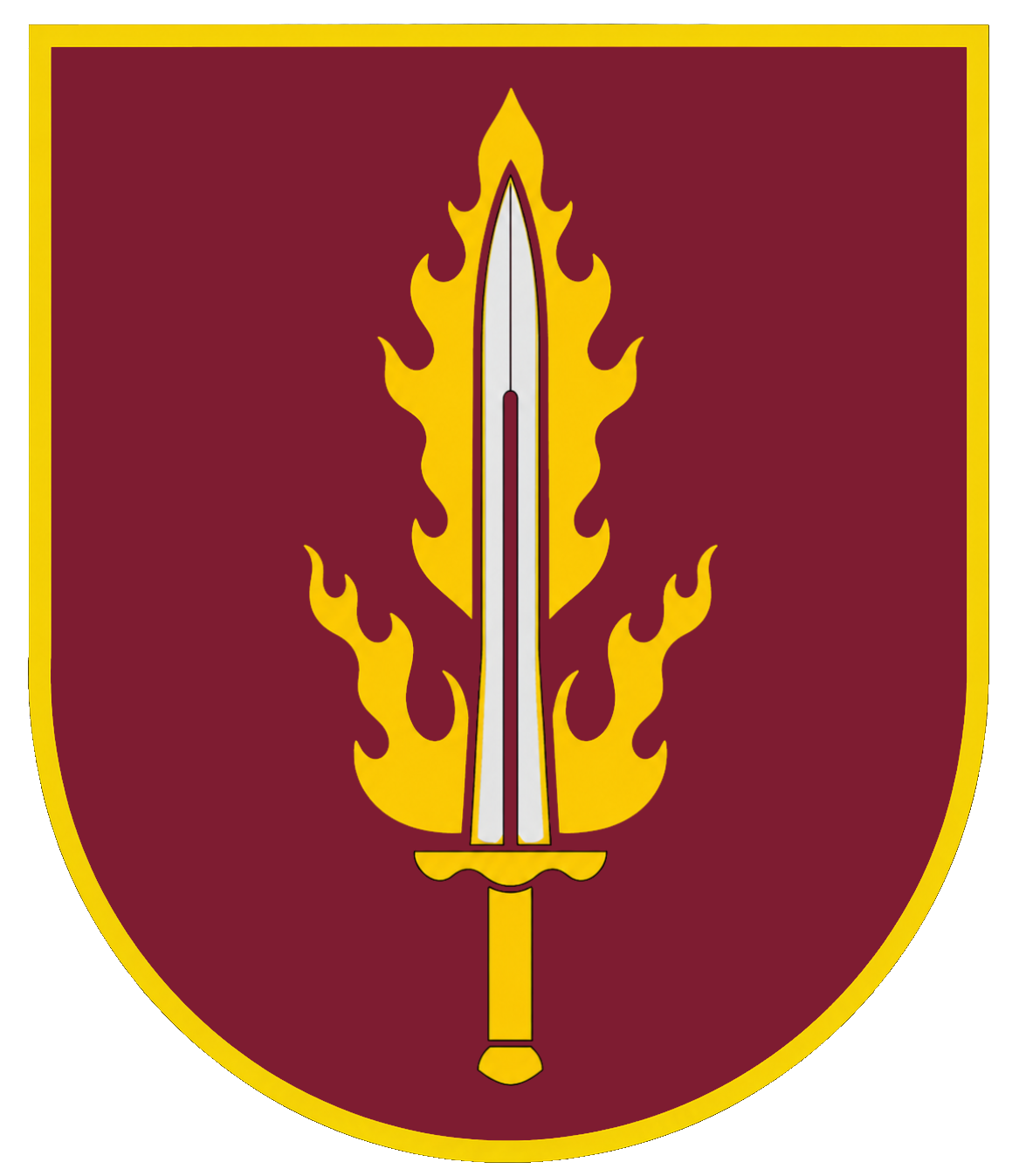
Operational Response Counterattack Team (ORKA)

=== Lithuanian State Border Guard Service ===
Vilnius Frontier District

Varėna Frontier District

Pagėgiai Frontier District

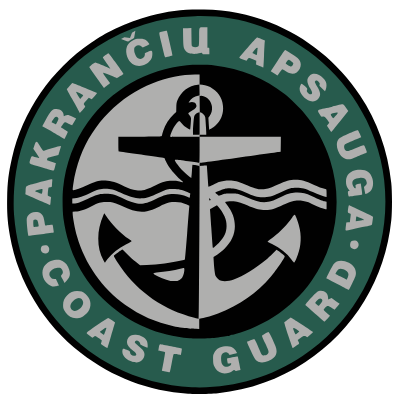
Coast Guard

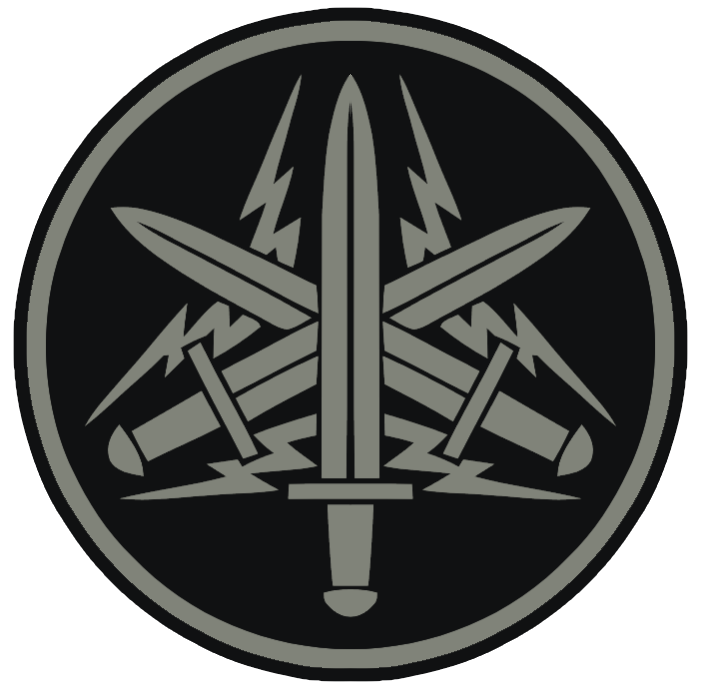
Special Purpose Unit (SPS)

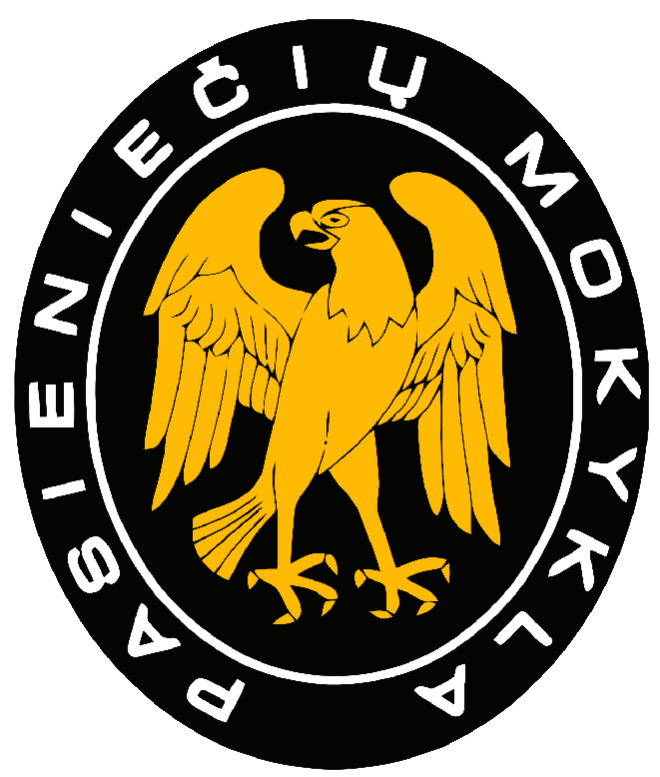
Lithuanian Border Guard School in Medininkai

== Cultural regions ==
Aukštaitija

Samogitia

Dzūkija

Suvalkija

Lithuania Minor

== Counties ==
Alytus County

Kaunas County

Klaipėda County

Marijampolė County

Panevėžys County

Šiauliai County

Tauragė County

Telšiai County

Utena County

Vilnius County

=== Alytus County ===
Alytus City Municipality

Alytus District Municipality

Druskininkai (also Druskininkai Municipality)

Lazdijai (also Lazdijai District Municipality)

Varėna (also Varėna District Municipality)

=== Kaunas County ===
Kaunas City Municipality

Birštonas (also Birštonas Municipality)

Jonava (also Jonava District Municipality)

Kaišiadorys (also Kaišiadorys District Municipality)

Kaunas District Municipality

Kėdainiai (also Kėdainiai District Municipality)

Prienai (also Prienai District Municipality)

Raseiniai (also Raseiniai District Municipality)

=== Klaipėda County ===
Klaipėda City Municipality

Klaipėda District Municipality

Kretinga (also Kretinga District Municipality)

Neringa Municipality

Palanga (also Palanga City Municipality)

Skuodas (also Skuodas District Municipality)

Šilutė (also Šilutė District Municipality)

=== Marijampolė County ===
Marijampolė (also Marijampolė Municipality)

Kalvarija (also Kalvarija Municipality)

Kazlų Rūda (also Kazlų Rūda Municipality)

Šakiai (also Šakiai District Municipality)

Vilkaviškis (also Vilkaviškis District Municipality)

=== Panevėžys County ===
Panevėžys City Municipality

Biržai (also Biržai District Municipality)

Kupiškis (also Kupiškis District Municipality)

Panevėžys District Municipality

Pasvalys (also Pasvalys District Municipality)

Rokiškis (also Rokiškis District Municipality)

=== Šiauliai County ===
Šiauliai City Municipality

Naujoji Akmenė (also Akmenė District Municipality)

Joniškis (also Joniškis District Municipality)

Kelmė (also Kelmė District Municipality)

Pakruojis (also Pakruojis District Municipality)

Radviliškis (also Radviliškis District Municipality)

Šiauliai District Municipality

=== Tauragė County ===
Tauragė (also Tauragė District Municipality)

Jurbarkas (also Jurbarkas District Municipality)

Pagėgiai (also Pagėgiai Municipality)

Šilalė (also Šilalė District Municipality)

=== Telšiai County ===
Telšiai (also Telšiai District Municipality)

Mažeikiai (also Mažeikiai District Municipality)

Plungė (also Plungė District Municipality)

Rietavas (also Rietavas Municipality)

=== Utena County ===
Utena (also Utena District Municipality)

Anykščiai (also Anykščiai District Municipality)

Ignalina (also Ignalina District Municipality)

Molėtai (also Molėtai District Municipality)

Visaginas (also Visaginas Municipality)

Zarasai (also Zarasai District Municipality)

=== Vilnius County ===
Vilnius City Municipality

Elektrėnai (also Elektrėnai Municipality)

Šalčininkai (also Šalčininkai District Municipality)

Širvintos (also Širvintos District Municipality)

Švenčionys (also Švenčionys District Municipality)

Trakai District Municipality

Ukmergė (also Ukmergė District Municipality)

Vilnius District Municipality

== Historical ==
Coat of arms of the Grand Duchy of Lithuania

Coat of arms of the Polish–Lithuanian Commonwealth

Coat of arms of the January Uprising (1863)

Coat of arms of the Kingdom of Lithuania (1918)

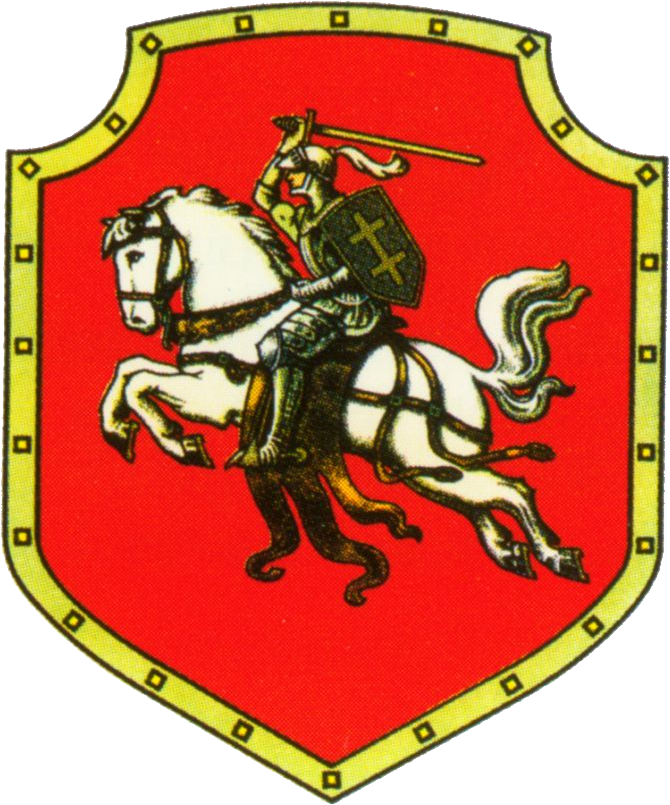
Coat of arms of Lithuania (1920–1940)

Coat of arms of Lithuania (1990–1991)

== See also ==
- List of flags of Lithuania
