= Kepi =

Flat circular cap with a visor

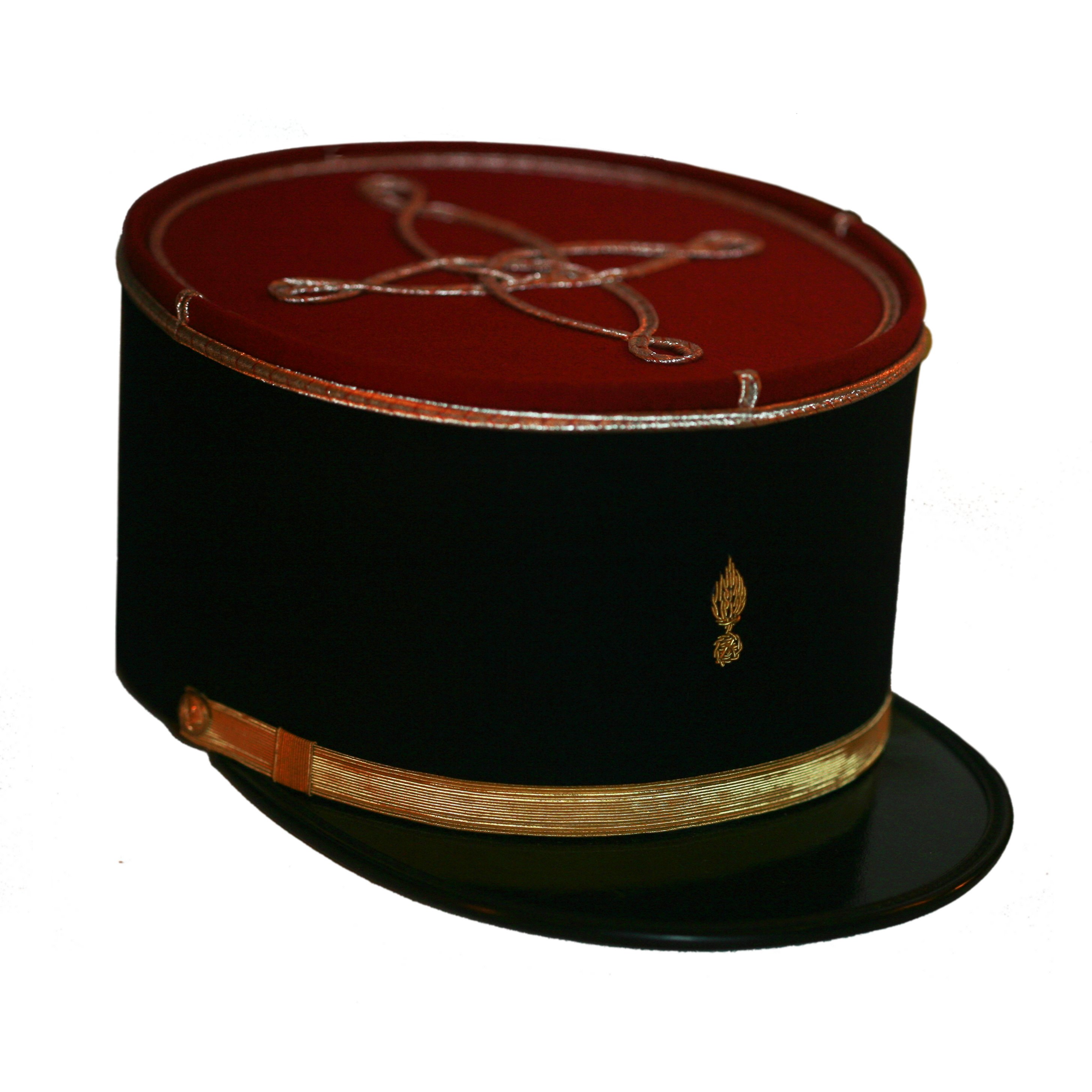
French Army kepi

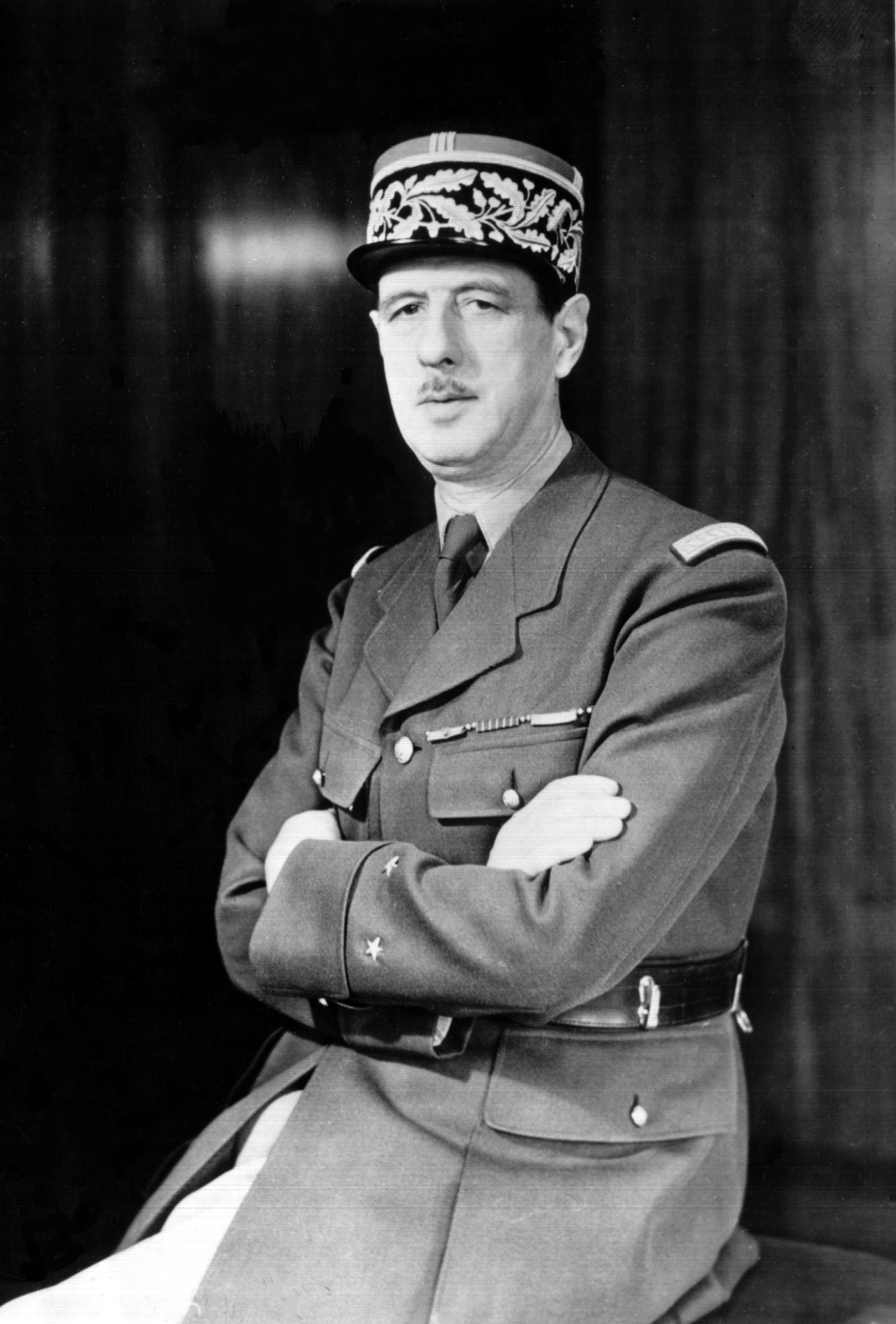
1942 portrait of General Charles de Gaulle of the Free French Forces wearing a kepi

The kepi (English: /ˈkɛpiː/ or /ˈkeɪpiː/) is a cap with a flat circular top and a peak, or visor. In English, the term is a loanword from French: képi, itself a re-spelled version of the Alemannic German: Käppi, a diminutive form of Kappe, meaning 'cap'. In Europe, the kepi is most commonly associated with French military and police uniforms, though versions of it were widely worn by other armies during the late 19th and early 20th centuries. In North America, it is usually associated with the American Civil War, as it was worn by soldiers on both sides of the conflict.

== French Army ==
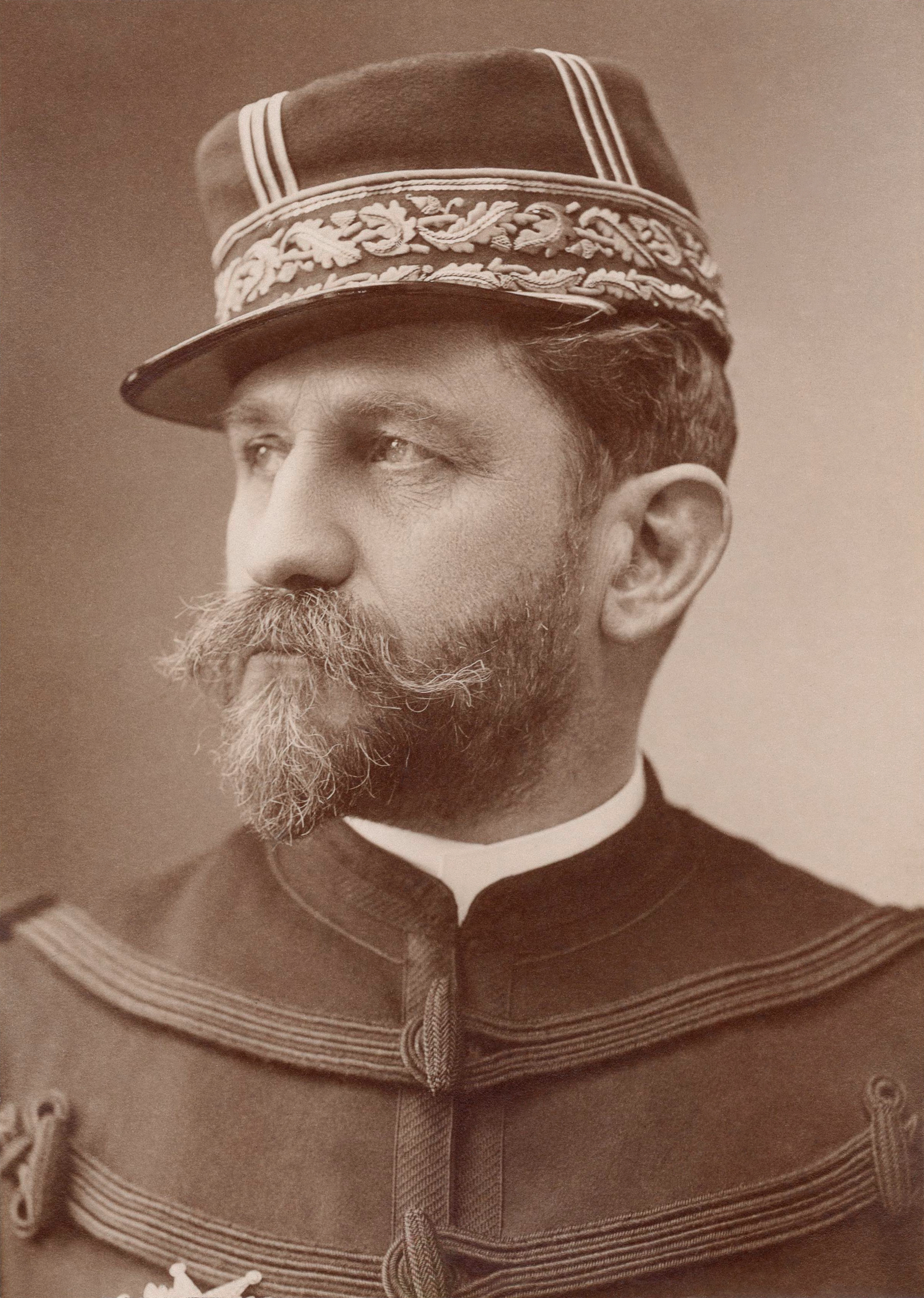
General Boulanger wearing a kepi c. 1880

The kepi was formerly the most common headgear in the French Army. Its predecessor originally appeared during the 1830s, in the course of the initial stages of the occupation of Algeria, as a series of various lightweight cane-framed cloth undress caps called casquette d'Afrique. These were intended as alternatives to the heavier, cloth-covered leather French Army shako. As a light and comfortable headdress, it was adopted by the metropolitan (French mainland) infantry regiments for service and daily wear, with the less practical shako being relegated to parade use. In 1852, a new soft cloth cap was introduced for campaign and off-duty. Called bonnet de police à visière, this was the first proper model of the kepi. The visor was generally squarish in shape and oversized and was referred to as bec de canard (duck bill). This kepi had no chinstrap (jugulaire). Subsequent designs reduced the size of the cap and introduced chinstraps and buttons. The kepi became well known outside France during the Crimean War and was subsequently adopted in various forms by a number of other armies (including the U.S. and Russian) during the 1860s and 1870s.

In 1870, when troops were mobilized for the Franco-Prussian War, large numbers of French soldiers either refused to wear the issued shakos or threw them away. Emperor Napoléon III abolished the infantry shako for active service and replaced it with the kepi on 30 July 1870.

In 1876, a new model appeared with a rounded visor, as the squared visor drooped when wet and curled when drying. The model used in World War I was the 1886 pattern, which was a fuller shape incorporating air vents. Described as an "ideal headdress—which was cheap, distinctive and easy to produce", the M1886 kepi's only significant drawback was that the sunken crown collected rain.

By 1900, the kepi had become the standard headdress of most French army units and (along with the red trousers of the period 1829–1914) a symbol of the French soldier. It appeared in full dress (with inner stiffening and ornamental plume or ball ornament) and service versions. Officers' ranks were shown by gold or silver braiding circling the centre and as a trefoil on the crown. The different branches were distinguished by the colours of the cap—see the table. Cavalry normally wore shakos or plumed helmets, reserving red kepis with light or dark blue bands for wear in barracks. General officers wore (and continue to wear for ceremonial purposes) kepis with gold oak leaves embroidered around the band.

In 1914, most French soldiers wore their kepis to war. The highly visible colours were hidden by a medium blue-grey cover, following the example of the Foreign Legion and other North African units who had long worn their kepis with white (or later khaki) covers in the field. With the adoption of "horizon blue" (light blue-grey) uniforms and steel Adrian helmets in 1915 to replace the conspicuous peacetime uniforms worn during the early months of the war, the kepi was generally replaced by folding forage caps. Officers, however, still wore kepis behind the lines.

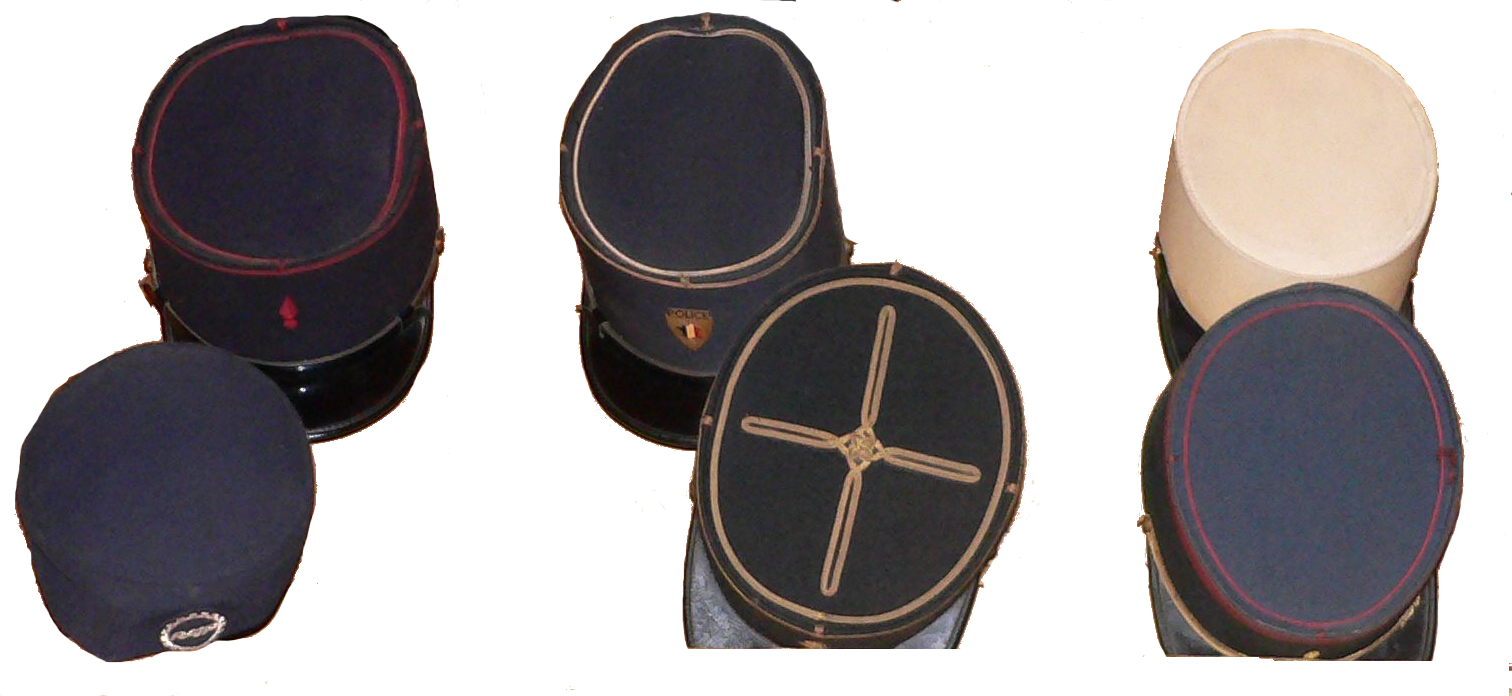
French kepis. Upper row (left to right), followed by lower row (left to right): French Army, Police Nationale (before they were replaced by peaked caps in the mid-1980s), Foreign Legion, unrelated, RATP Public Transport, Gendarmerie Nationale

Following the war, the kepi was gradually reintroduced in the peacetime French Army, but was never adopted for wear in the Navy or Air Force. The Foreign Legion resumed wearing it in 1926; initially in red and blue, and then in 1939, with white covers on all occasions. The bulk of the French army readopted the kepi in the various traditional branch colours for off-duty wear during the 1930s. It had now become a straight-sided and higher headdress than the traditional soft cap. This made it unsuitable for wartime wear, and after 1940, it was seldom worn, except by officers. An exception was the Foreign Legion, who, previously just one of the many units that wore the kepi, now adopted it in its white version as a symbol.

== Modern French usage ==
=== Army ===
The decision in 1991 to end conscription in France, and to rely on voluntary enlistment, has led to the readoption of various traditional items for dress wear. This has included the reappearance in the army of the kepi which is now worn by all ranks in the majority of units, on appropriate occasions. Within the army, particularly notable are the kepis of the French Foreign Legion, whose members are sometimes called képis blancs (white kepis), because of the unit's regulation white headgear. Former cavalry units wear light blue kepis with red tops plus silver braid (for officers) and insignia. Other colours include all dark blue with red piping (for artillery units), dark blue with red tops (line infantry) and crimson with red tops (medical). The "dark blue" of officers' kepis is very similar to black.

Corps	Colour of band	Colour of crown	Braid and insignia
Infantry, Zouaves (now disbanded) and Chasseurs-Paratroopers	dark blue	red	gold
Tirailleurs	light blue	red	gold
Shock Parachuters, Shock Commandos, Supply and Quartermaster's Corps	dark blue	red	silver
Cuirassiers, Dragoons, Hussars, Tanks and Matériel	light blue	red	silver
Infantry Chasseurs	dark blue	dark blue	silver French horn
Spahis	light blue	red	gold
Artillery, Marines and Transmissions	dark blue	dark blue	gold
Engineers and Bands	black	black	gold
Légion étrangère	white (privates, corporals and chief corporals) black (chief corporals with more than 15 years service, NCOs and officers)	white red	gold (infantry) silver (cavalry)
Army Aviation	blue	blue	gold
Medical Corps (now all-services combined corps with naval style caps)	crimson	red	gold
Pharmaceutical Corps	green	red	gold
Veterinarian Corps	purple	red	silver
Dental Corps	brown	red	gold
Chasseurs forestiers (disbanded in 1924)	dark green (vert finance)	dark green	silver French horn

=== Other French organizations ===
The kepi was adopted in 1854 for wear as a working headdress by police agents and sergents de ville as an alternative to the heavy and less practical bicorne previously worn.

The French National Police discarded their dark blue kepis in 1984 as part of a general updating of uniforms, adopting a low peaked cap. The reason given was that the rigid kepi, while smart and distinctive, was inconvenient for ordinary use and too high to be comfortably worn in vehicles.

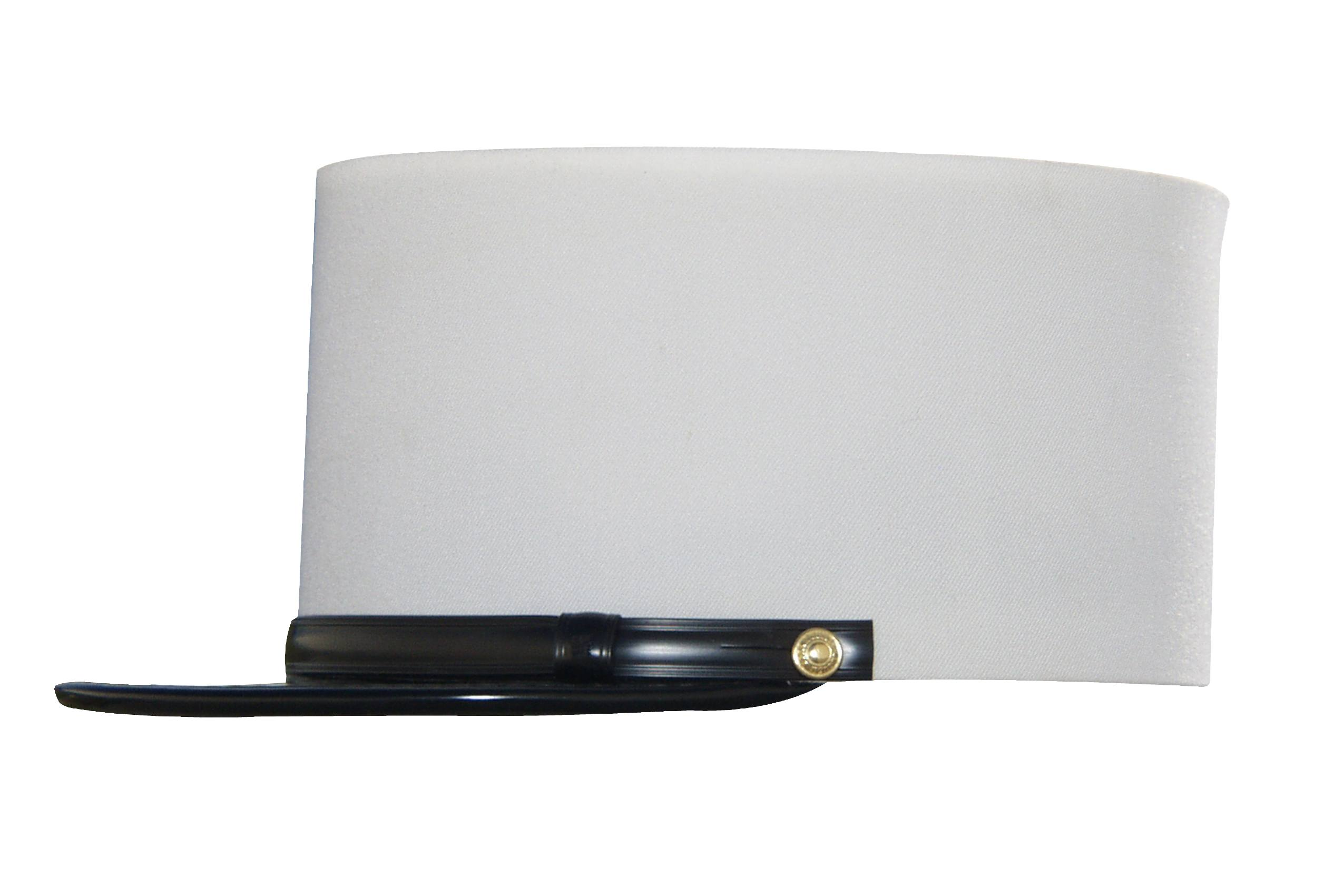
White kepi of the Foreign Legion

French customs officers (douaniers) and the Gendarmerie still wear kepis for ceremonial duty. Customs officers wear a baseball style cap for ordinary duties (since 1994 with many variations) while the Gendarmerie introduced a "soft kepi" in the early 2000s.

== North American usage ==
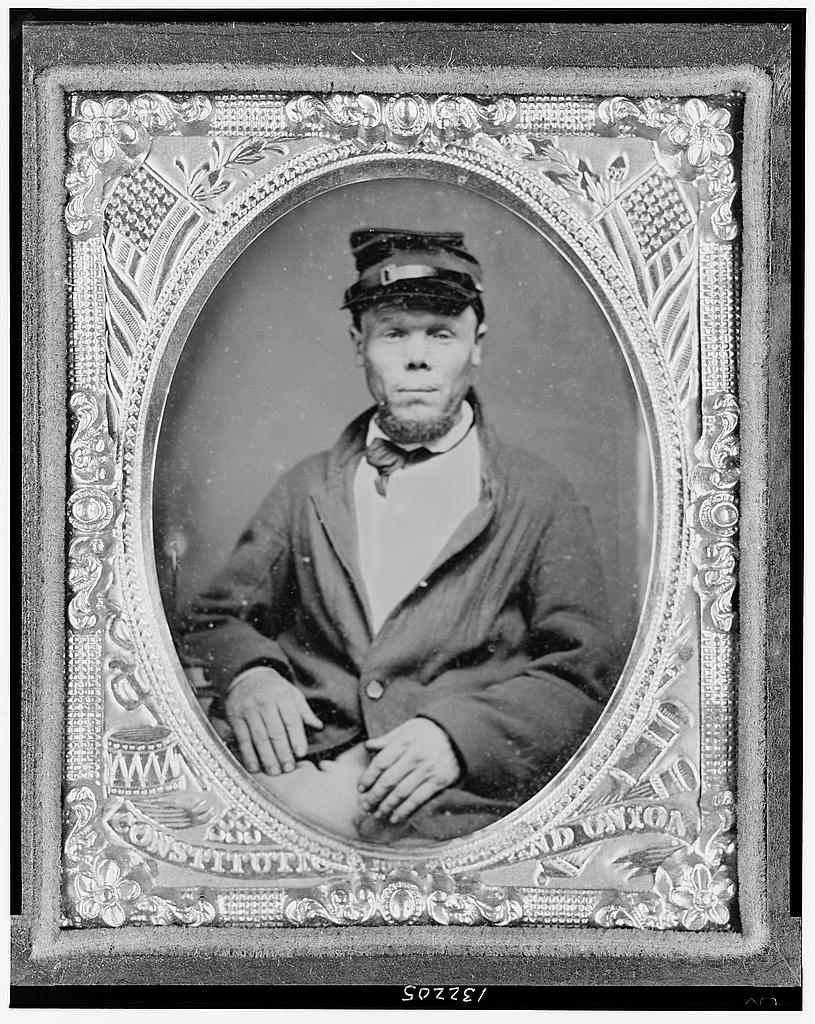
Portrait of an unidentified Union soldier wearing a forage cap during the American Civil War

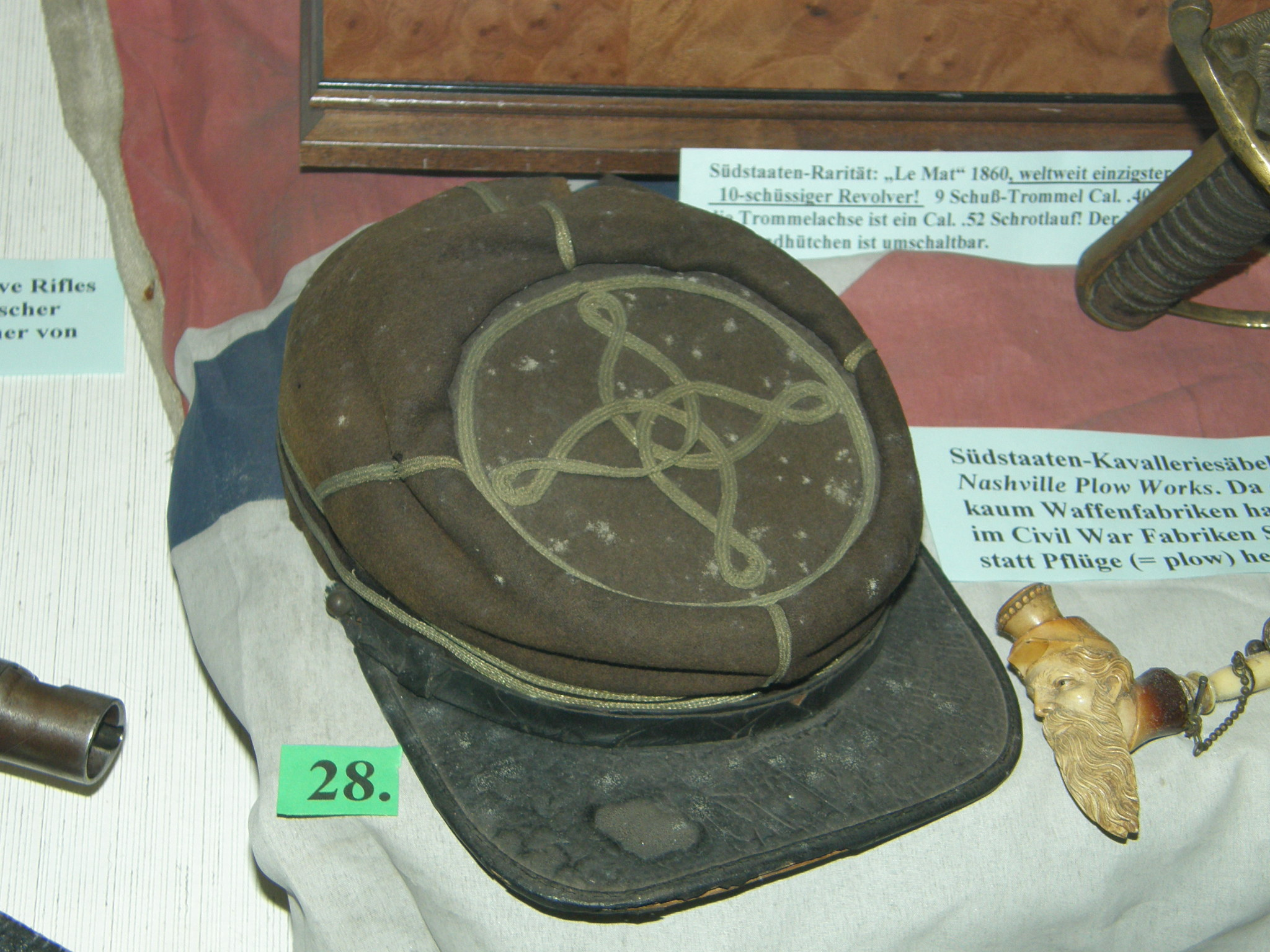
An old Confederate kepi in a German museum

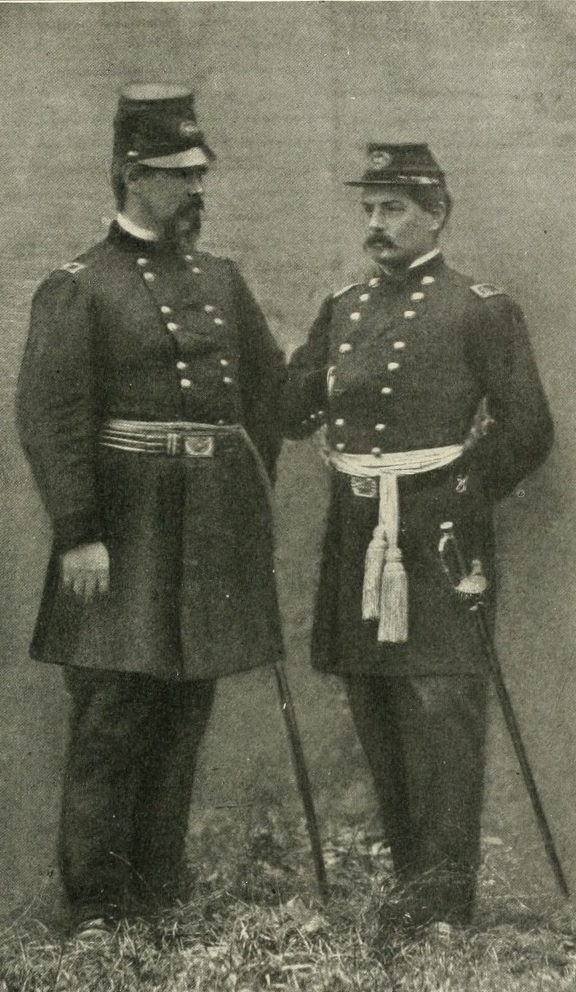
Irvin McDowell and George B. McClellan wearing the two most common regulation kepis of the US Army. The McDowell cap had a crescent shaped peak, while the McClellan cap was more fitted.

In the United States, the kepi is most often associated with the American Civil War era, and continued into the Indian Wars. Union soldiers were generally issued kepis for fatigue use. A close copy of the contemporary French kepi, it had a sunken top and squared visor. It was often called a "McClellan cap", after the Union commander of the Army of the Potomac, G. B. McClellan. For field officers, the caps were often decorated in a French-influenced style, with a dark velvet band around the base and black silk braiding on the crown. The kepi was also popular with various state units and as privately purchased headgear; e.g., it was standard issue in 1861 for New York infantry regiments.

The kepi is not to be confused with the model 1858 forage cap, sometimes called a "bummer cap" or McDowell cap, which evolved directly from the shako used by the regular army earlier in the 1850s (see the design of the crown, chinstrap, brim, and buckle). Essentially, the forage cap, described by some troops as "shapeless as a feedbag", was a less-expensive and more comfortable version of the earlier shako with the stiffening removed. The forage cap became the most common form of cap worn by U.S. regulars and volunteers during the American Civil War, though it is most commonly associated with the eastern theater of the war, since western troops generally preferred broad-brimmed felt hats (see photos of Sherman's army parading through Washington D.C. at war's end). Some Union units wore coloured variants, as some illustrative examples show:

- 14th New York State Militia (from Brooklyn) – dark blue base, red sides, dark blue top, red circular insert
- 12th New York Infantry – red base, grey sides, red top, white piping and later – dark blue base, light blue top and sides, white piping
- 11th Indiana Infantry – all red cap
- United States Cavalry – Dark blue with a yellow base.
- U.S. Sharpshooters – dark green (also used forage caps)

While some Confederate troops wore the forage cap (Confederate General Thomas J. "Stonewall" Jackson wore the plain dark blue round-visored forage cap from his days as an instructor at the Virginia Military Institute), Confederate uniform regulations specified a French-style kepi. These were to be trimmed as follows:

- Confederate Regulars:
  - 1st pattern
    - Infantry – light blue base, grey sides and top
    - Cavalry – yellow base, grey sides and top
    - Artillery – red base, grey sides and top
  - 2nd pattern
    - Infantry – dark blue base, light blue sides and top
    - Cavalry – dark blue base, yellow sides and top
    - Artillery – dark blue base, red sides and top

The regulations were often ignored because of the scarcity of materials and the need for rapid production. The average Confederate kepi usually was a simple gray or butternut cap made of wool or jean wool. To save leather for shoes and accoutrements, by mid-war Confederate kepi brims often were made of tarred cloth; chinstraps were sometimes omitted. Many Confederate units wore unique versions of the kepi. These included:

- Winchester Zouave Cadets (of South Carolina) – all red
- Kentucky Brigade cavalry – all yellow
- Alexandria Rifles (of Virginia) – dark green

After the war the U.S. Army issued a series of kepi undress caps, characterised by their increasing smartness and decreasing practicality. The last model was issued in 1896. When the United States introduced a revised blue dress uniform in 1902, the kepi was discontinued in favour of a conventional visor cap with wide top and a steep visor.

The US Army's and Air Force's current patrol cap, the standard covers in utility uniforms (the ACU and ABU, respectively), is a variation of the flat-topped, visored kepi. Its modern lineage can be traced to World War II, and during the Cold War period was "blocked" with heavy starching and ironing (referred to as a "Ridgeway cap"). It was replaced with a flat kepi-style cap with a metal rim reinforced crown and baseball cap-styled rounded visor during the Vietnam War. The present-day patrol cap was introduced in the 1980s with the transition to the M81 BDU uniforms, and was retained when the Army adopted the UCP digital-pattern camouflage uniforms in 2005; and with the Air Force's adoption of the ABU in 2007.

== South America ==
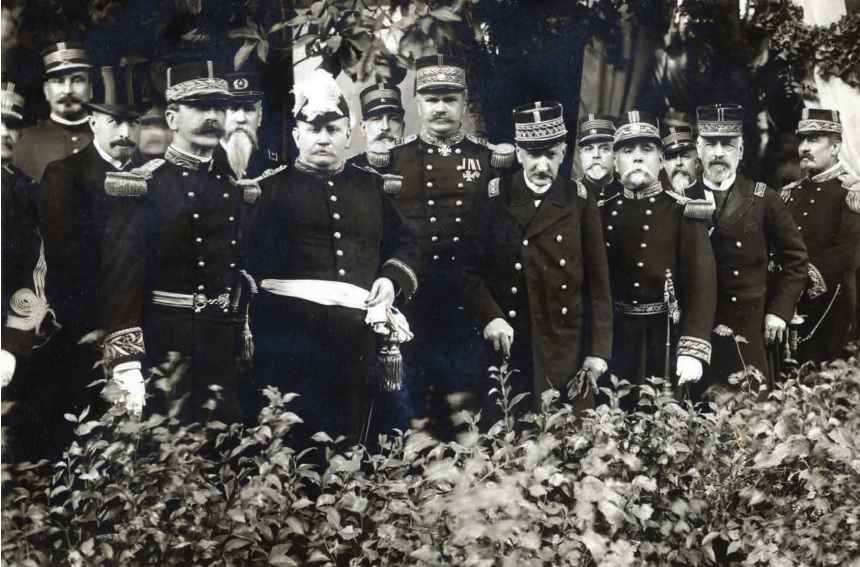
Chilean Army generals in their French-influenced uniforms 1897: Gorostiaga, Lopetegui, Bulnes, Körner, Baquedano, del Canto, Cortes, Novoa.

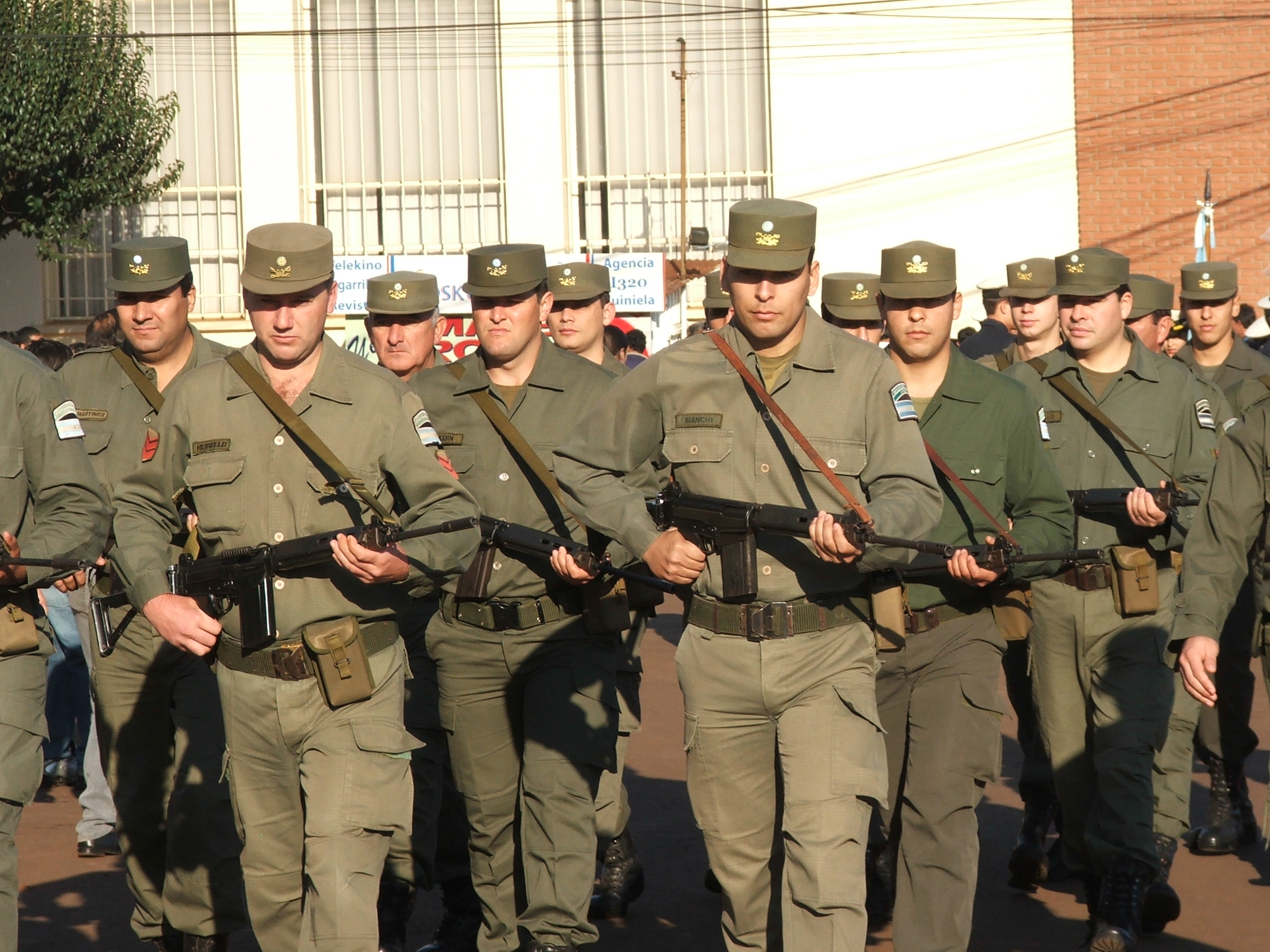
Personal-Gendarmeria-Nacional-Argentina

During the Paraguayan War between Brazil, Argentina, and Uruguay versus Paraguay — the Brazilian, Argentine, and Uruguayan troops and officers primarily wore kepis, though many Brazilian troops wore brimmed hats, and Uruguayan and Argentine light infantry wore shakos. The Paraguayans mostly wore leather shakos, but senior officers were given kepis. Leather kepis were however issued as a forage cap to Paraguayan troops, and because of poor supply standards, were often seen in combat.

With the exception noted below, the Chilean Army no longer wears kepis, but during the War of the Pacific, it was part of the standard army uniform. Similarly, the kepi is no longer worn by the modern Peruvian armed forces and police, but was part of the uniforms worn during the 19th and early 20th centuries.

Today, the following ceremonial units in several countries still use the kepi:

- in Chile, the 4th Company of the 6th Infantry Regiment "Chacabuco" and the 1st Historical Company of the 4th Mechanized Infantry Brigade "Rancagua";
- in Peru, the Fanning Marine Company of the Peruvian Navy; and the National Police of Peru's Guards Inspector Mariano Santos Company. Both retain the War of the Pacific uniforms, respectively, of the Peruvian Navy and the Civil Guards of Peru. A Peruvian Army company has recently adopted the kepi and white uniforms worn by the 2nd Infantry Battalion "Zepita" — a style used during the War of the Pacific — for public parades.
- The Bolivian Colorados Regiment (1st Infantry) and the 2nd and 3rd Infantry Regiments of the Bolivian Army, together with cadets of the Army NCO School, also wear the kepi as part of their full dress uniforms on major ceremonial occasions.
- The Paraguayan Army Presidential Guard Regiment, together with the Army Headquarters, have platoons dressed in the Paraguayan War uniforms complete with black kepis.

The Argentine National Gendarmerie (Gendarmería Nacional Argentina; GNA) members wears a green kepi as part of fatigue and full dress uniforms.

== Military/police usage elsewhere ==
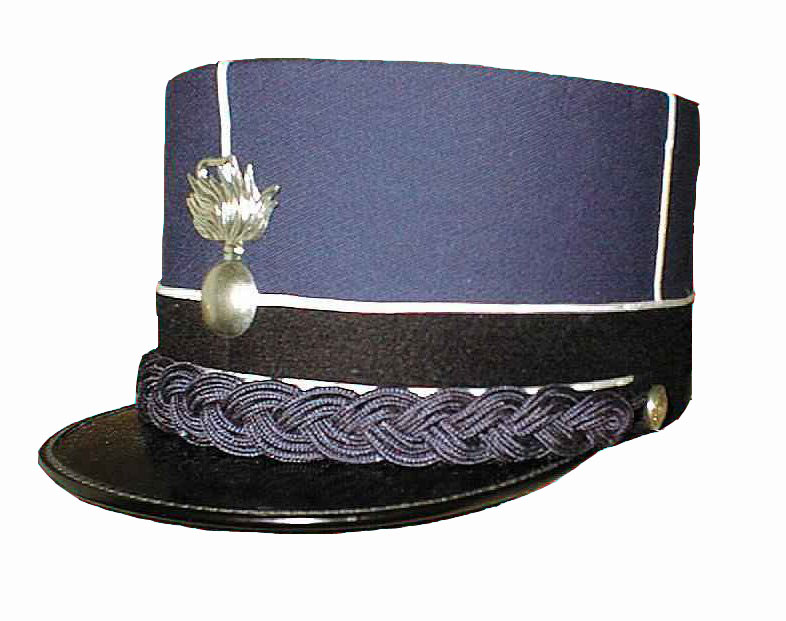
Kepi of the Corps of Gendarmerie of Vatican City

The practical nature and relatively low cost of the kepi made it a popular military headdress from the mid-nineteenth century on. Many Latin American armies wore kepis in the late 19th and early 20th centuries which were close copies of the French model. Other armies that favoured kepis during the final period of colourful uniforms that ended with World War I included the Danish, Portuguese, Dutch, Italian (officers only), and Romanian armies. Even the Japanese Army adopted French-style kepis for senior officers in full dress, as well as for their Gendarmerie units and military bands. Significantly such historic opponents of France as Germany and Britain, avoided the use of kepis, with only a few short-lived exceptions, such as for service in India during the 1850s-60s. During this time the Albert shako was preferred. This may have been for practical rather than patriotic reasons, as the distinctive profile of the kepi would be likely to lead to confusion in battle.

=== Belgium ===
Influenced by France's adoption of the kepi, Belgium introduced it in 1845 as a forage cap for infantry other ranks. This headdress was worn until 1868 when a new model without a vizor was adopted. Officers of infantry and cavalry regiments wore their own version of the kepi from 1859 until the First World War. It was modified several times over the decades, the last version being the 1900/1910 model. By that time it had evolved into a comparatively tall cylinder with the national emblem at the front and a cross-shaped Austrian knot on the crown. The wearer's rank was indicated by a system of horizontal and vertical bands of gold or silver braid. The kepi was also worn by officers of the General Staff.

In September 1914 the wide range of peacetime headdresses (shakos, busbies, "Corsican" caps, czapkas and bearskins) still being worn by the Belgian Army, were replaced by the universal "Yser" kepi. This consisted of a dark blue or green soft cap with folding double flaps. With the adoption of a British-style khaki uniform from 1915, the kepi was abandoned in favour of the peaked cap for all ranks, with the exception of the paramilitary Gendarmerie, who continued to wear the kepi as part of their parade dress until the 1960s.

Danish m1915 Kepi

=== Denmark ===
Used by all soldiers of the Danish army until World War II, it is now only retained as part of the full dress uniforms for officers.

=== Germany ===
Nazi SA wearing kepis 1928

In Nazi Germany, the brown stiff kepi (Schaftmütze) of the Nazi Sturmabteilung (SA) paramilitary and its black version initially worn by the members of the SS (before it was replaced by a peaked cap) were derived from surplus Austrian equipment.

=== Greece ===
The Hellenic Army and the paramilitary Hellenic Gendarmerie historically followed French patterns in organization, doctrine, and dress since its establishment. A dark blue (green for cavalry) kepi was adopted in the 1860s, and used until khaki field uniforms were introduced in 1910, whereupon it remained in use in ceremonial uniforms. The 1915 pattern uniform adopted a German-inspired peaked cap instead, but after Greece's entry in World War I, the Greek military was re-equipped by the French, and the kepi returned to use. It was retained as part of both field and ceremonial uniforms until the adoption of British-style uniforms in 1937. Ceremonial use continued in the No.1 gala uniform until the early 1970s. In the post-1974 Third Hellenic Republic, it is used exclusively by the officer instructors and cadets of the Hellenic Army Academy (in blue), by the cadets of the NCO Academy, and by the honour guards of the Ministry of National Defence (in blue).

As a result of the historical military usage, the kepi is still widely used by uniformed marching bands in Greece.

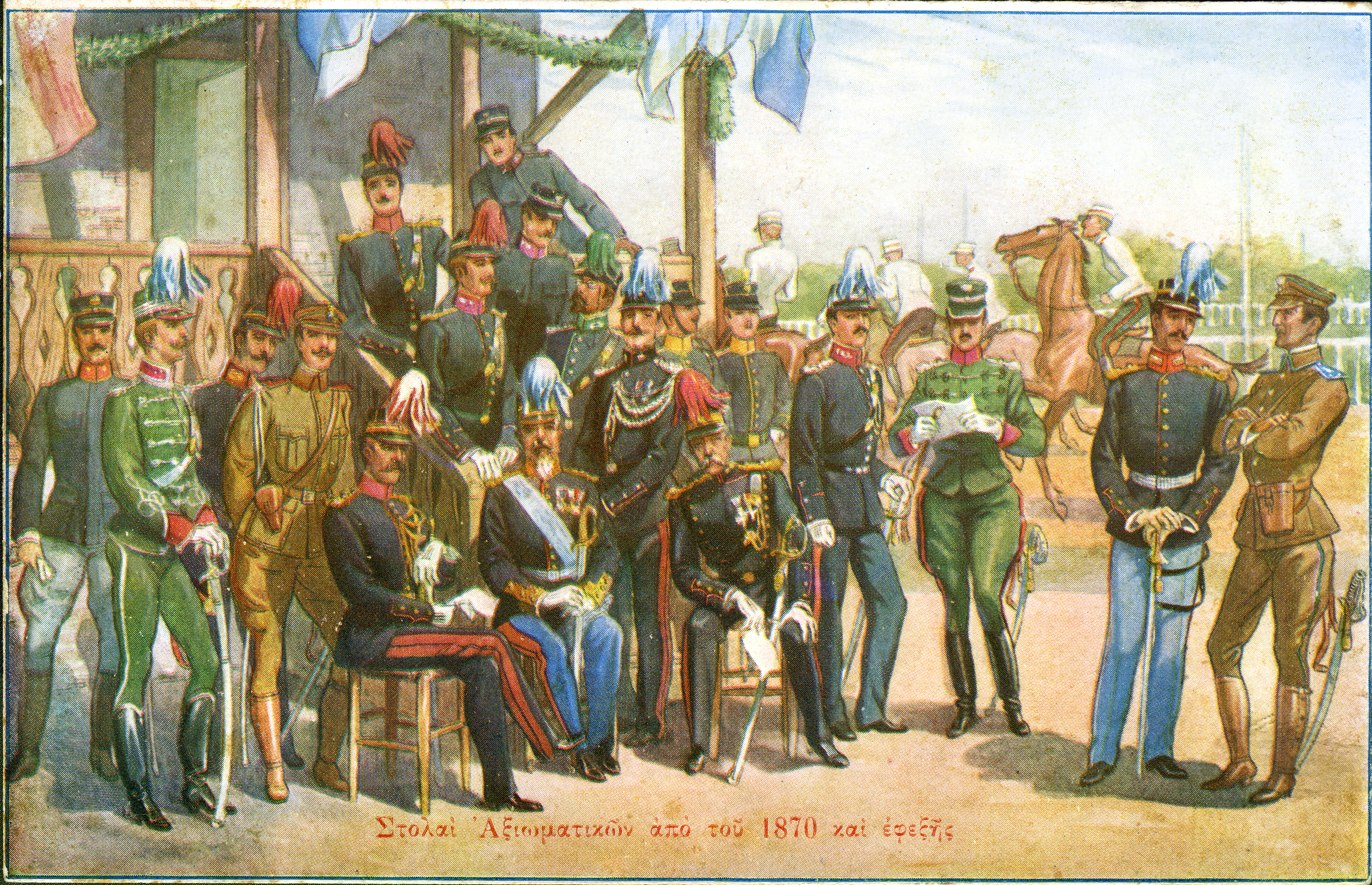
Selection of Greek army uniforms from c. 1870 to c. 1910

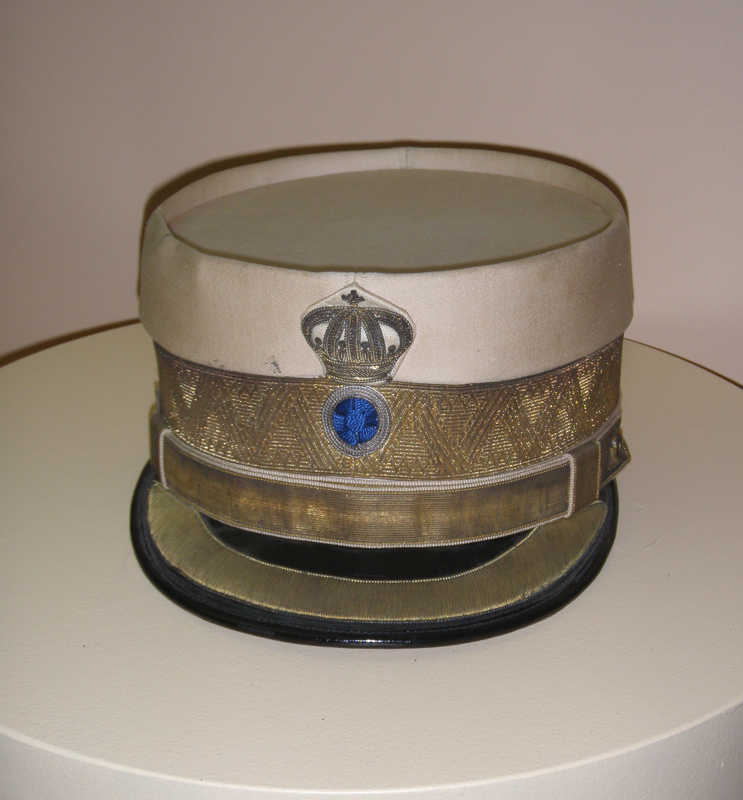
White (summer) kepi of a lieutenant general, c. 1910

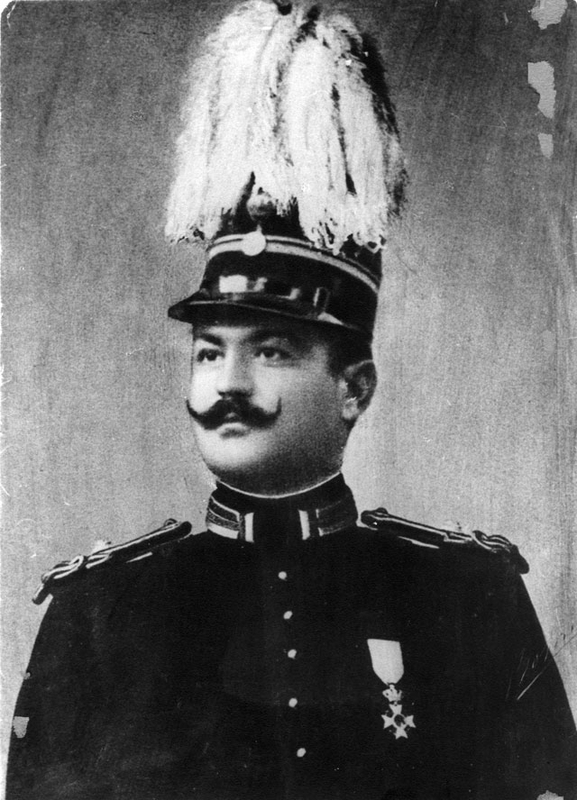
Second lieutenant with ceremonial peacock feather bush, c. 1904

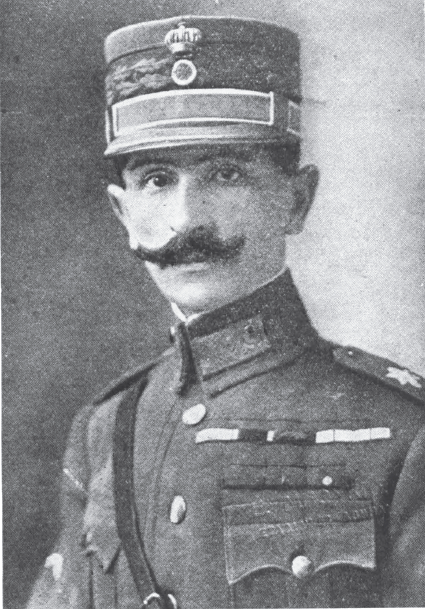
Major general in field uniform, c. 1920

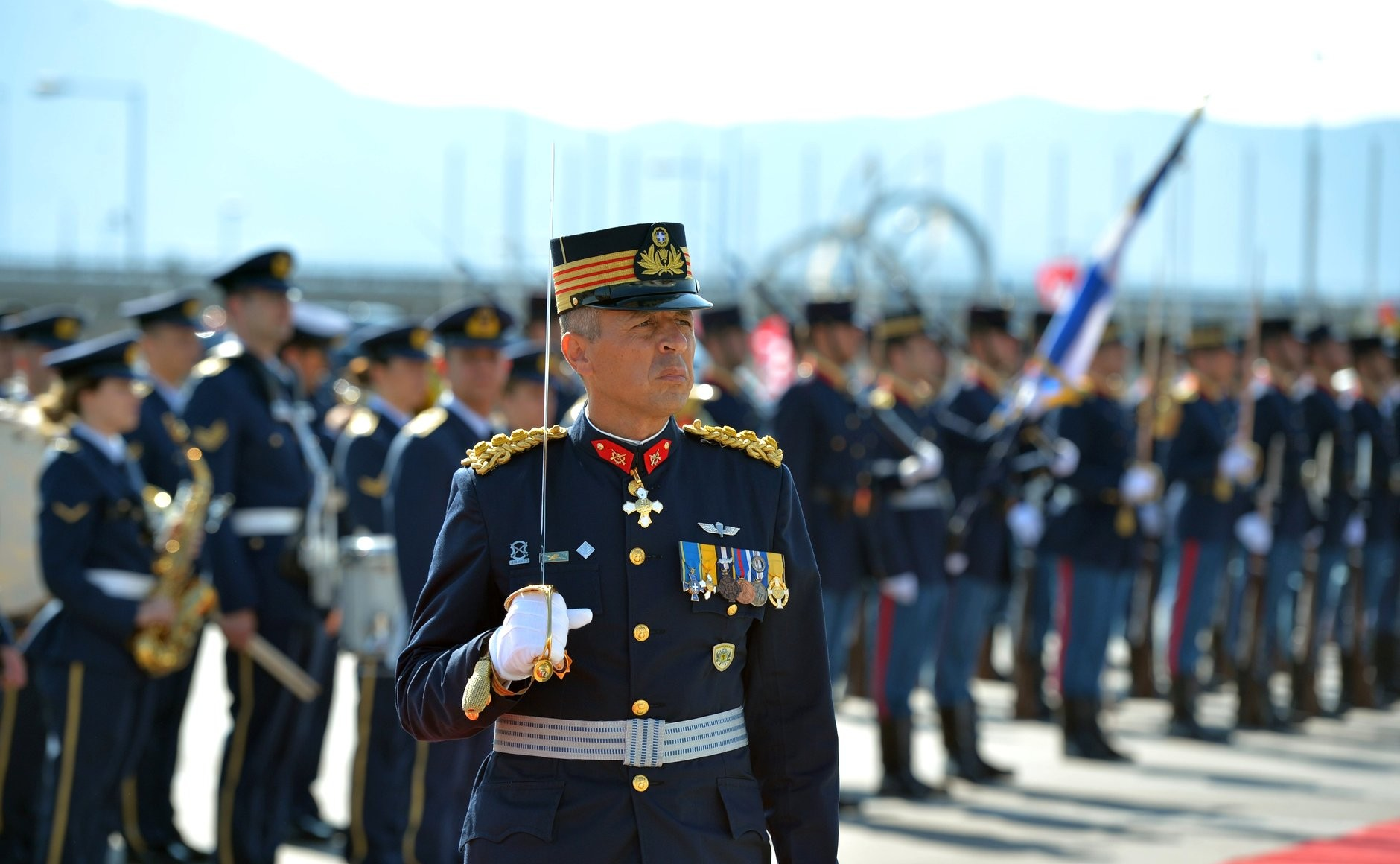
Colonel of the Hellenic Army Academy as an honour guard, 2016

=== India ===
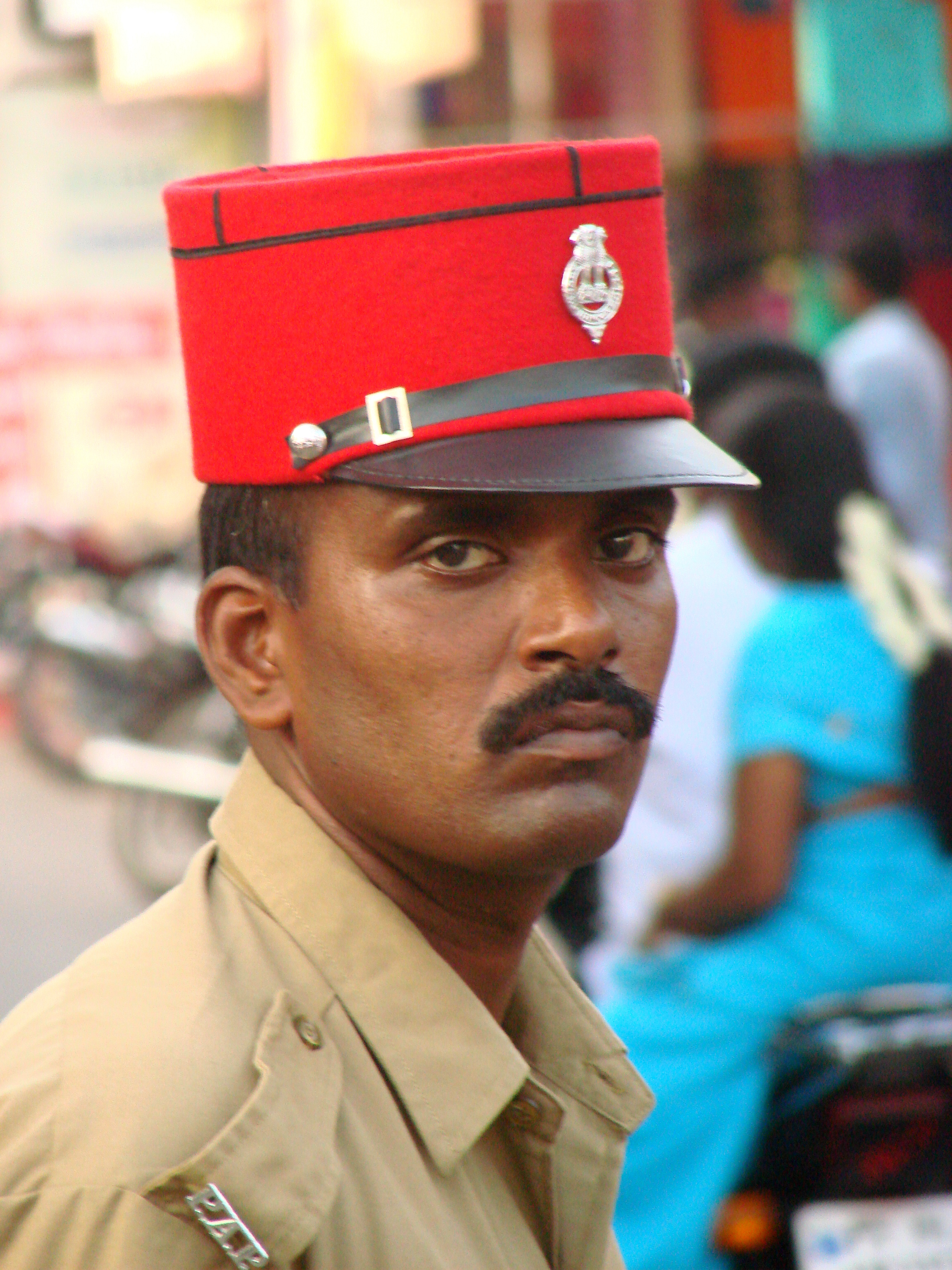
A police constable in Pondicherry

In India, during the French colonial rule of Pondicherry, Yanam, Karaikal and Mahé, kepis were worn by two kinds of policemen, the Armed and the Indigenous, differentiated by the colour of the kepis they wore. While the law and order forces wore bright red caps, the armed constabulary was conspicuous by its blue kepis. After Indian Independence, the former French colonial territory was integrated into the Union Territory of Puducherry and the bright red kepi continues to be the headgear of the constabulary — both for the local and the armed police signifying the cultural and administrative legacies left by the former colonialists.

=== Iran ===
In Iran this kind of headdress was known as the "Pahlavi hat" (kolah pahlavi, کلاه پهلوی). Only worn for a brief period, from 1927 until the 1930s, it was generally of a grey color.

=== Italy ===
The kepi was the main headdress in the Italian Army from its constitution to 1933, in both ceremonial and field uniforms. It had different degrees of markings for branch or unit, and rank. From its traditional blue, rigid shape, the kepi evolved in 1909 a field version, more comfortable and in the Army's traditional 'grigioverde' (gray-green), with increasingly less visible markings. Since then, it was gradually substituted with the more comfortable side cap and later - during the Second World War - the beret; the kepi remains standard issue with historical uniforms for both the Army and the Police, especially for musicians and education institutions, as part of their ceremonial dress.

=== Latvia ===
In modern ceremonial dress the Latvian National Armed Forces Staff Battalion and musicians of the Central Military Band of the Latvian National Armed Forces both wear backward sloping kepis of the style worn by the Belgian Army immediately prior to World War I.

=== Luxembourg ===
Kepis with a slightly higher back were formerly worn by the Luxembourg Army until 1945. Since World War II they were replaced by British Army-style peak caps.

The same kepis with higher back were also worn by the former Grand Ducal Gendarmerie in a blue version corresponding to the colour of their uniforms.

The kepi is still used by the newly created Grand Ducal Police which replaced the Gendarmerie and the local police forces in 2000.

=== Northern Ireland ===
A form of kepi is worn by female officers in the Police Service of Northern Ireland. It was formerly worn in the Royal Ulster Constabulary.

=== Norway ===
The Norwegian armed forces used kepis until World War II and still retain them as part of the full dress of officer cadets.

=== Spain ===
In Spain, a version of the kepi (actually a low shako), the ros, is used by the Guardia Real (Royal Guard) and the Regimiento de Infantería Inmemorial del Rey for ceremonial functions. The Spanish 1887 regulation kepi, was used in the late 19th and early 20th century by officers of certain regiments. Similar to a Kepi, a Teresiana, was made of black oilcloth with a tortoise shell visor. A plainer form of kepi was retained by the Civil Guard as its non-ceremonial headdress for normal police duties, until it was abolished under the 2011 revised regulations and replaced by a baseball cap.

=== Sweden ===
In Sweden, the kepi has been used with several uniform types for the Swedish Army. The most common was the grey kepi worn as part of the M1923 field uniform and the dark blue kepi worn as part of the uniform types m/1886 and m/1895, and still in use by the Life Guards.

=== Switzerland ===
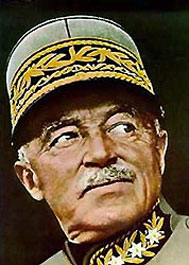
General Henri Guisan of the Swiss Army wearing a kepi with rank insignia

In Switzerland, the kepi was worn as a part of the dress uniforms of senior NCOs (Sergeant major and above) and officers (with additional rank insignia) until the 1995 army reform (Swiss Armed Forces). Since then, it has only been worn by senior staff officers (Brigadier general and higher).

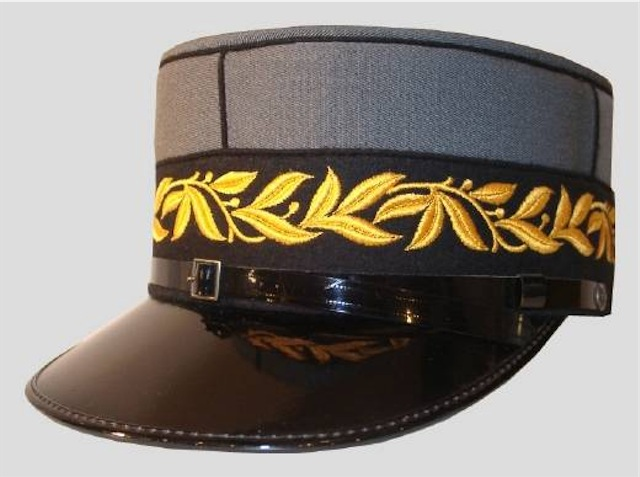
Brigadier General

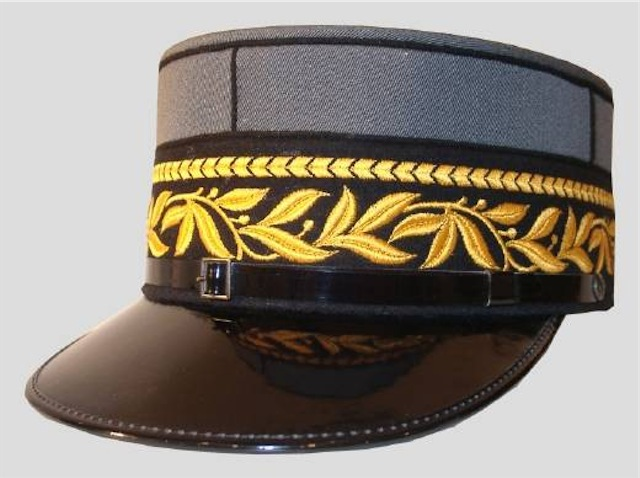
Major General

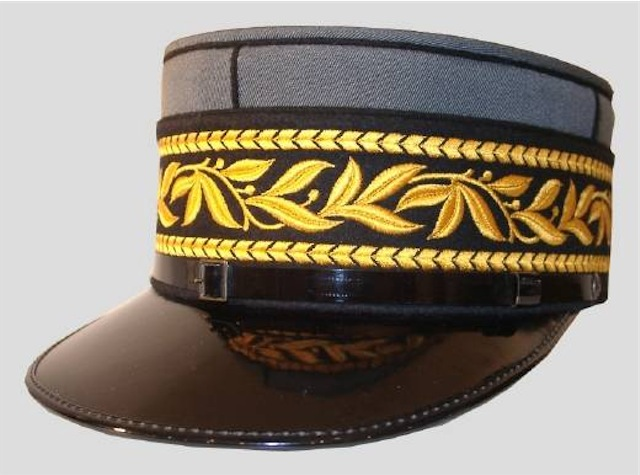
Lieutenant General

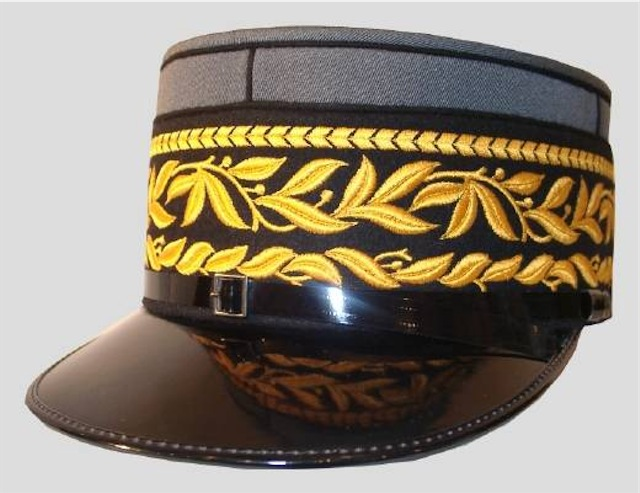
General

=== Thailand ===
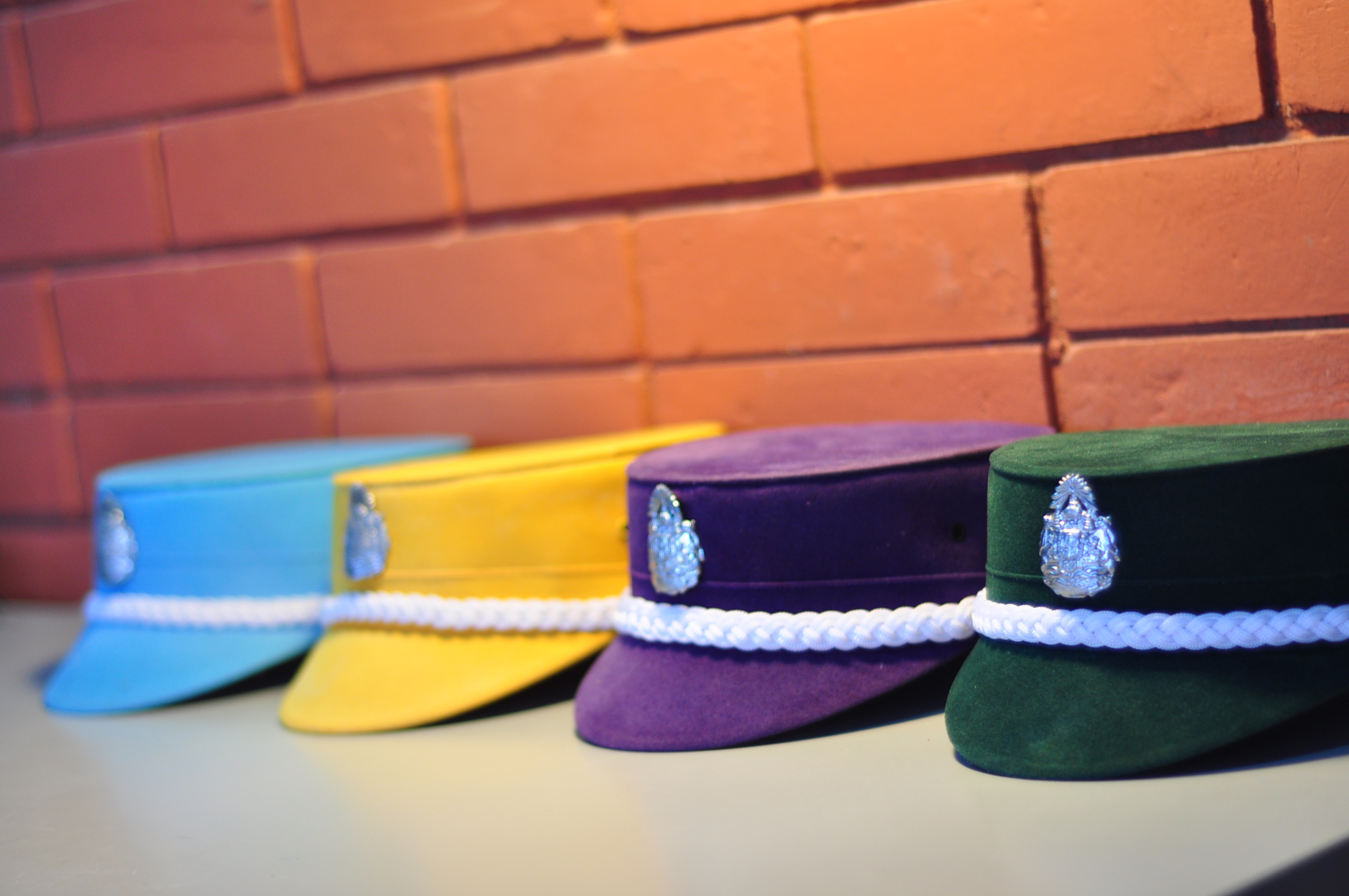
Thai Police Cadet (RPCA) Kepi cap

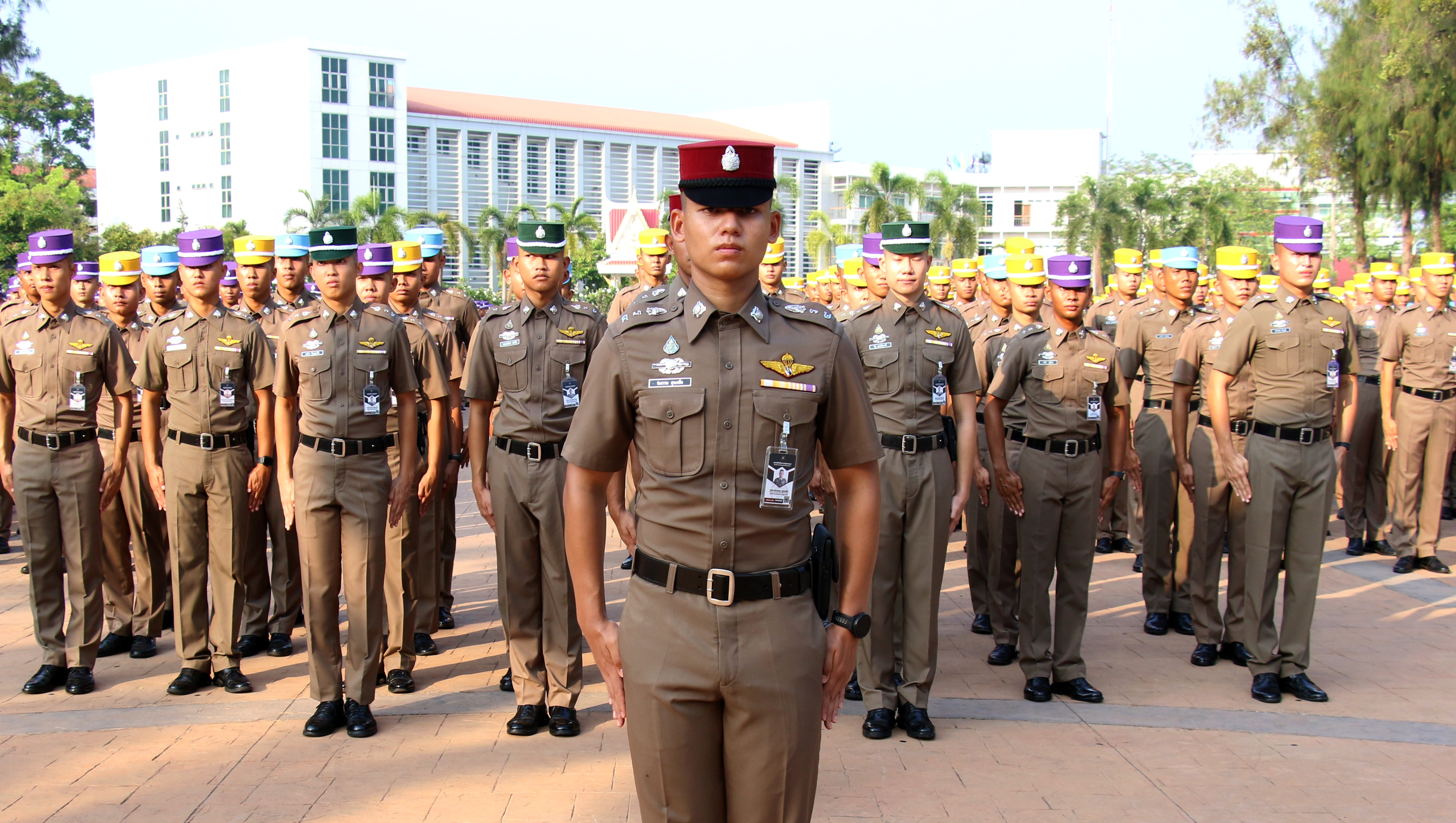
Thai Police Cadet (RPCA) in study uniform with Kepi cap.

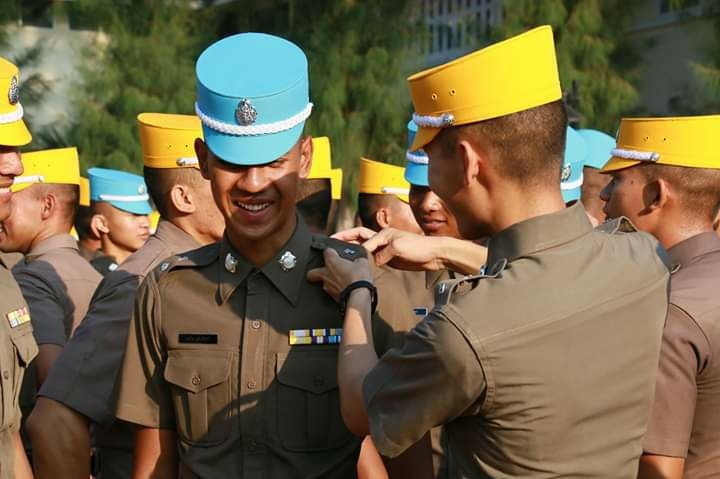
Thai Police Cadet (RPCA) in study uniform with Kepi cap.

In Thailand, the Royal Thai Police Cadet Academy (RPCA) has adopted the culture of wearing the Kepi cap of the Gendarmerie police since about 1902 onwards. the kepi cap has been used with the study uniform and casual attire of police cadets at the RPCA.

== Non-military use ==
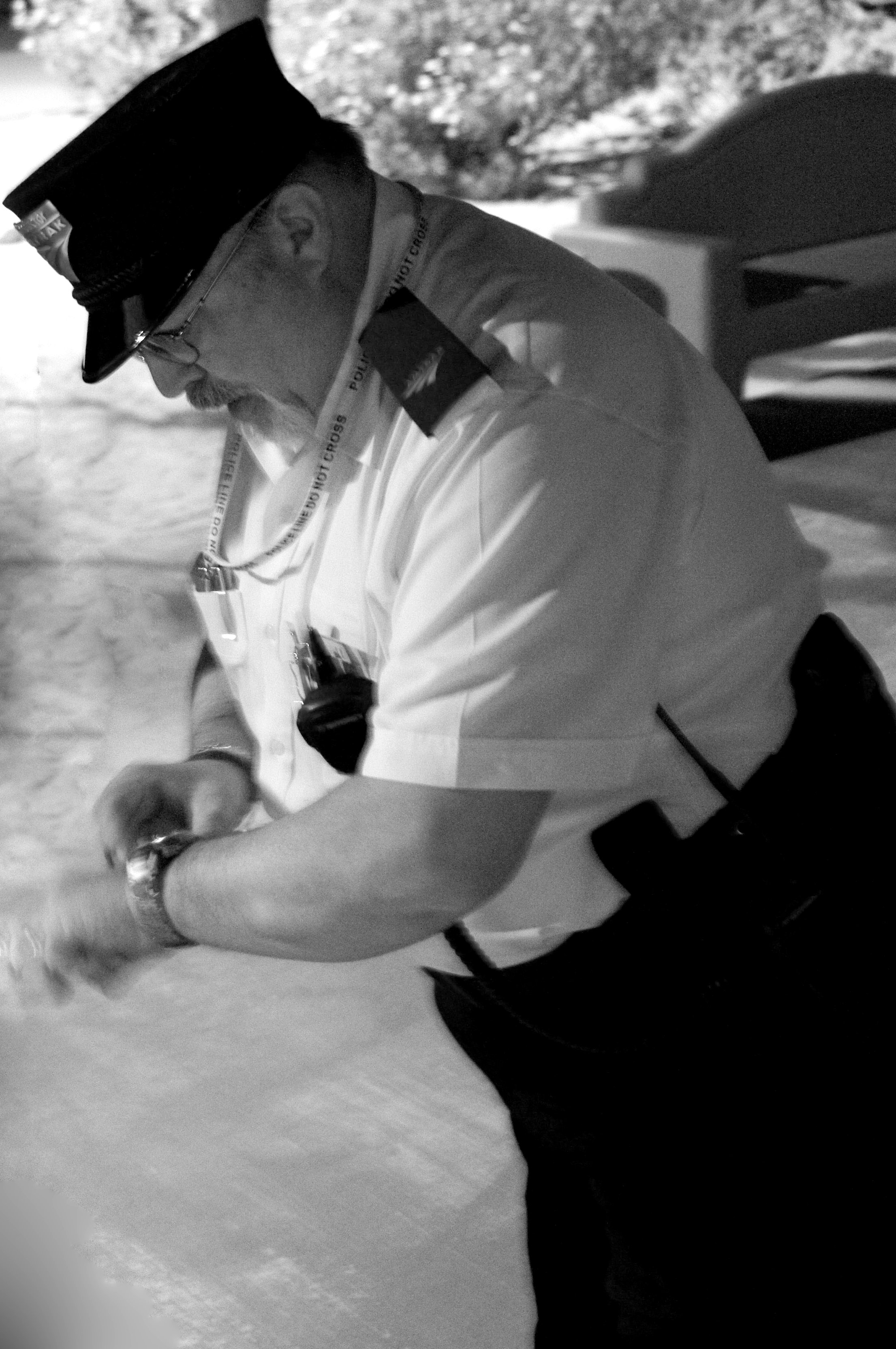
Conductor on an Amtrak passenger train in the United States

Kepis also found their way into the uniforms of numerous railway and streetcar operators in the United States. From there it was adopted by other public transport operators around the world, including the examples given below:

- in Brisbane, Australia, drivers and conductors continued to wear distinctive white kepis with black visors until 1961. Brisbane bus inspectors continued to wear black kepis with decorative braid until the introduction of a blue version in 1987. Brisbane Transport finally replaced inspectors’ kepis in 1995, although as of 2006 they could still be worn at official functions.
- Belgian Railways conductors (but not train drivers or other personnel) wear a kepi as part of their daily uniform.
- Train dispatchers (Pengatur Perjalanan Kereta Api/PPKA) of the Indonesian Railways wear a red kepi as part of their uniform.
- A form of kepi modeled on the Austrian ski-cap was the standard headgear of uniformed British Rail male employees from the mid-1960s to the mid-1980s.
- A round peak-less cap with an outline resemblance to a kepi is also worn by traditional student fraternities (Studentenverbindungen) in Germany, Austria, Switzerland and Belgium. They come in different varieties and are very colorful in appearance.
- In the United States, the Nation of Islam's security/executive protection force, the Fruit of Islam, also wears a dark blue version of the kepi.
- The Columbus Blue Jackets players and coaching staff award a kepi to the most impactful player on the ice for each match.

== Gallery ==
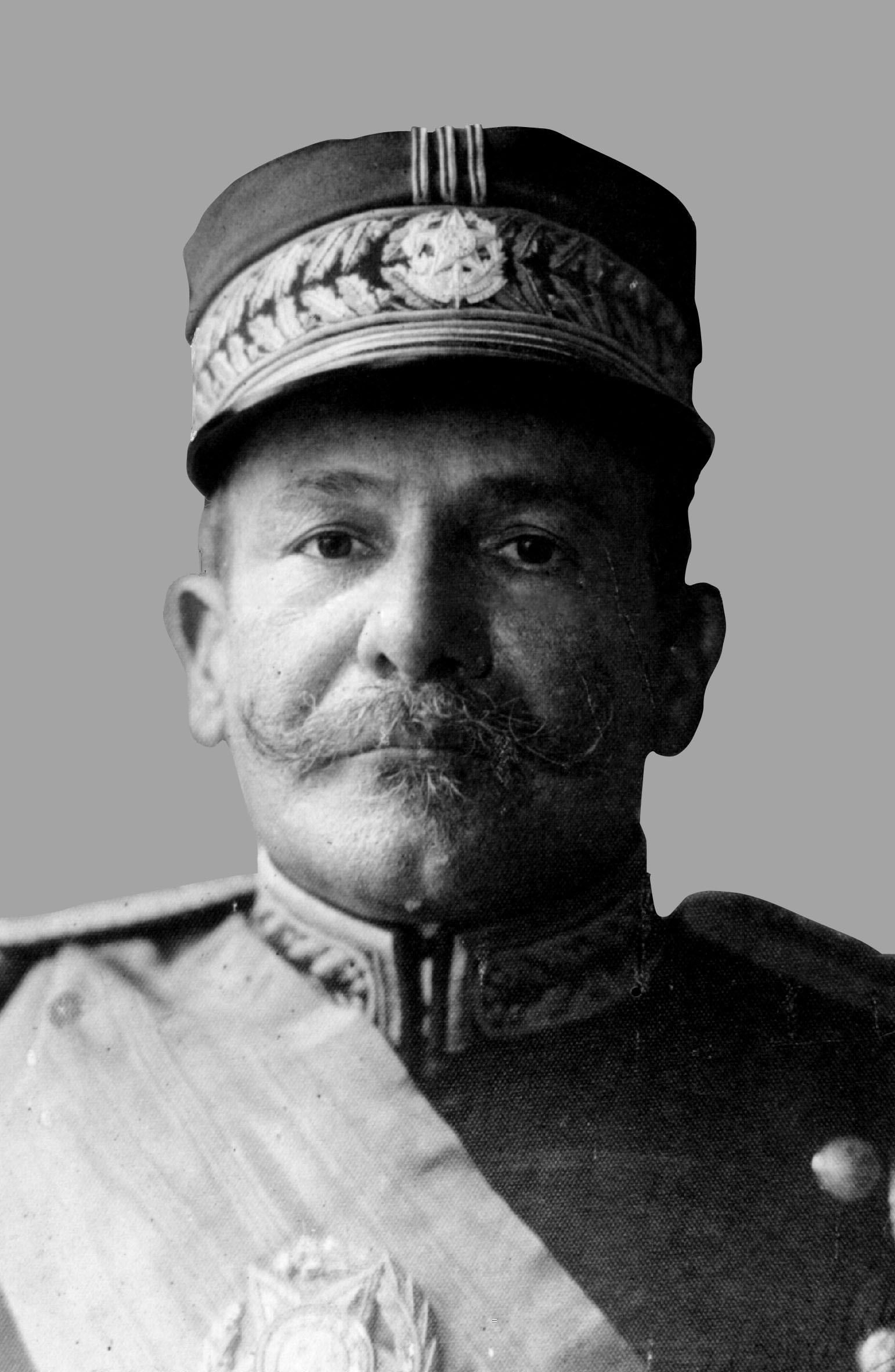
Marshal Hermes da Fonseca, then-President of Brazil, wearing a kepi, c. 1910

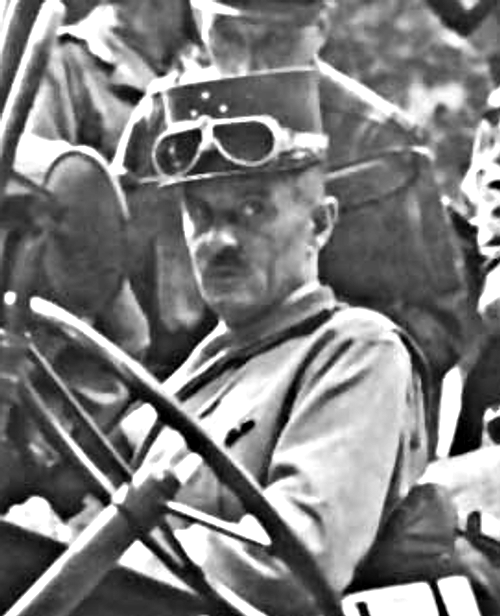
French general General Leclerc wearing a kepi, with goggles; World War II era

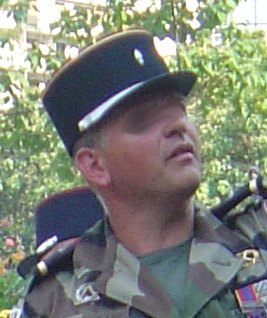
Contemporary French Army kepi

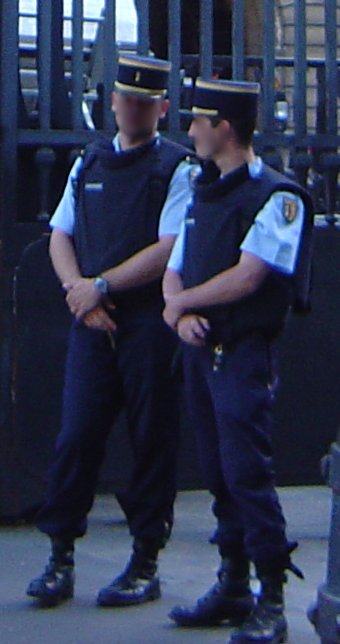
French gendarmes of the Gendarmerie Mobile

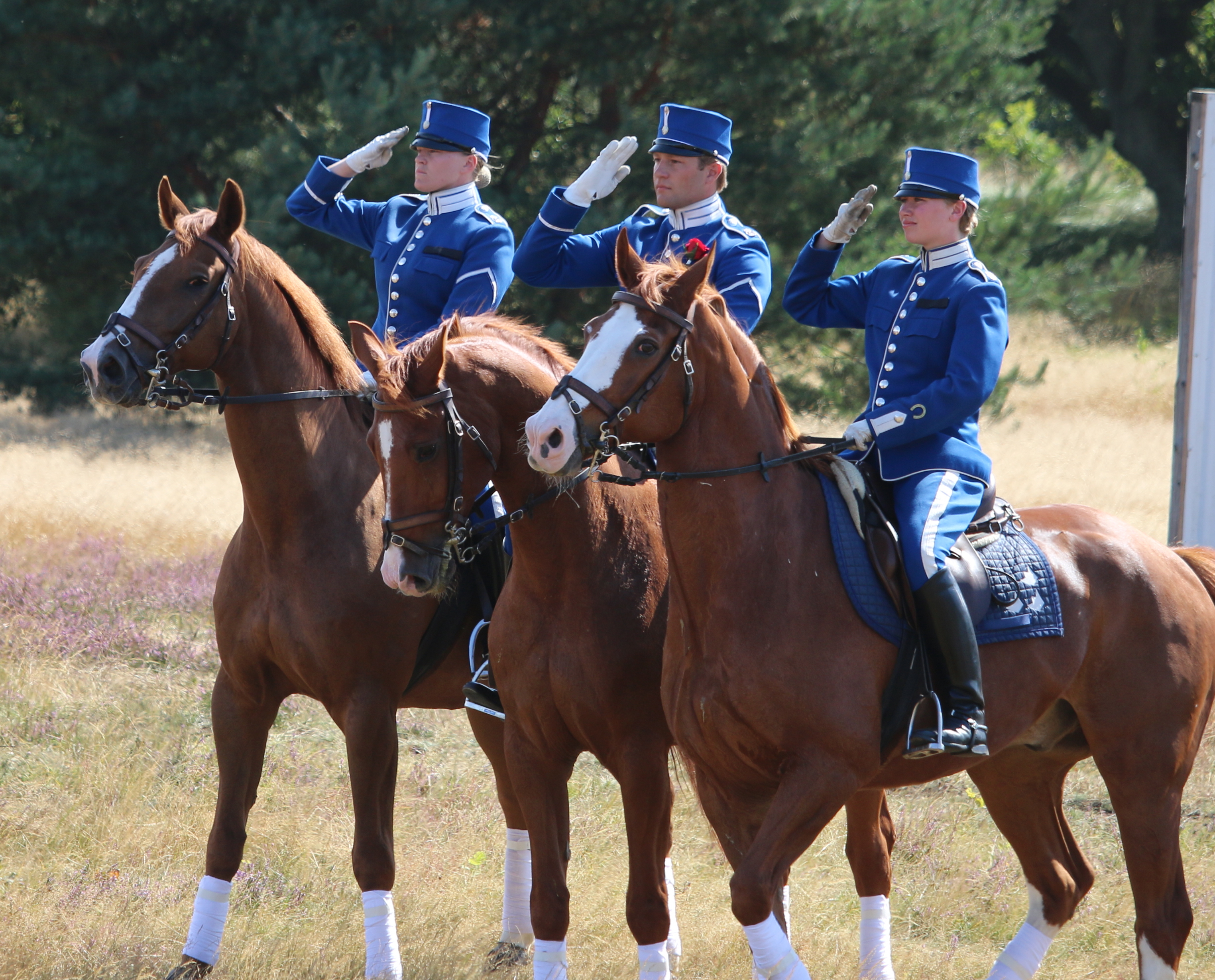
Royal Swedish Life Guard dragoons in 2015

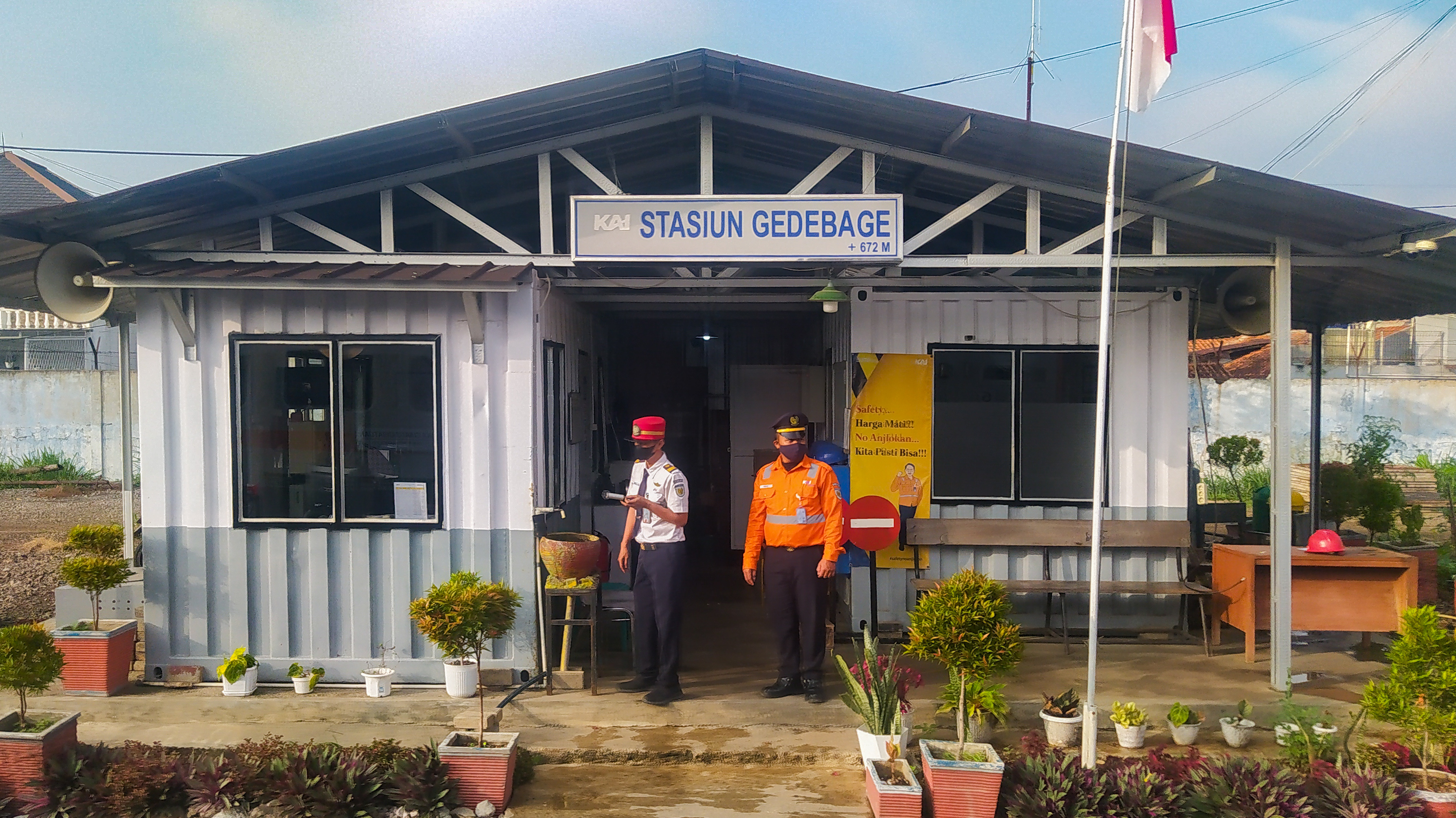
Indonesian Railway train dispatcher with red kepi in 2022

== See also ==
- Peaked cap
- Military uniforms
- Dress uniform
- Full dress uniform
- List of hat styles
- List of headgear
- Cap
