= Central Military Band of the Latvian National Armed Forces =

Musical unit in the Latvian National Armed Forces

- Military Band
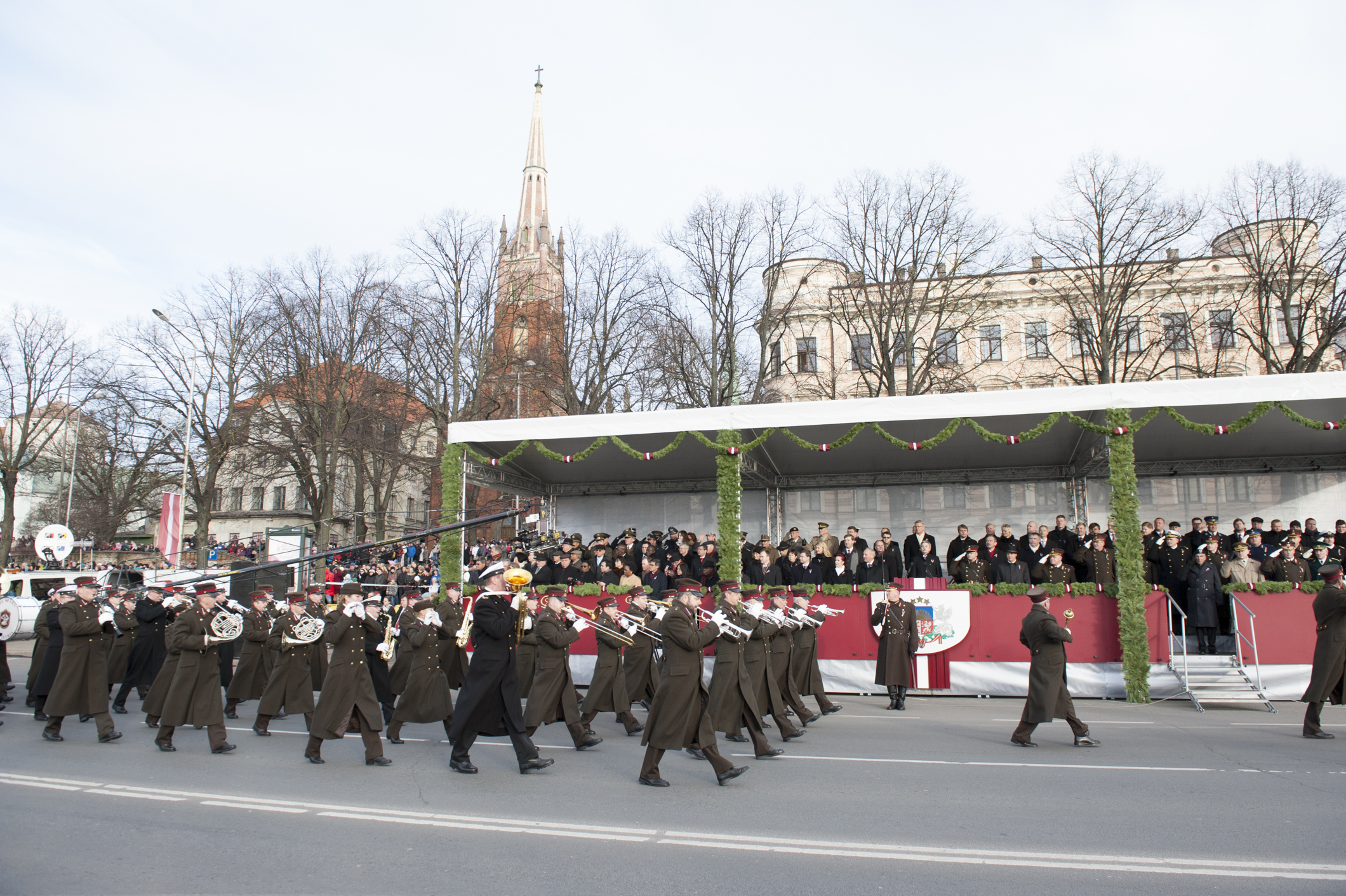
- Native name: Latvijas Nacionālo bruņoto spēku Centrālais militārais orķestris
- Short name: NAF Staff Band
- Founded: 21 December 1991; 34 years ago
- Location: Riga, Latvia
- Principal conductor: Dainis Vuskans

The Central Military Band of the Latvian National Armed Forces also known as the NAF Staff Band (NBS Štāba orķestris) is the central military band of the Latvian National Armed Forces Staff Battalion. It is the largest military band in Latvia.

== History ==
On February 6, 1919, Captain Ludvigs Bolšteins, commander of the newly formed Latvian Army ordered company No.11 of the Latvian Army to form a band composed of 11 volunteers. This was considered the first military band of independent Latvia. As the country regained its independence in December 1991, a group of military musicians with years of experience in various Soviet military bands reestablished the original Latvian band as part of the Staff Battalion and was based on the organizational structure of the Headquarters Staff Band of the Baltic Military District which operated during the long Soviet occupation. Dainis Vuskans, a Soviet musician of Latvian ethnicity, who at the time served as the conductor of the Soviet Army's 11th Band in Kaliningrad, was immediately invited to become the band's first conductor. On January 3, 1992, the band made its first performance at the Latvian War Museum. Since then, the band has grown into a professional group of military musicians.

It has taken part in receptions for Bill Clinton and the Pope in Riga. Foreign conductors have contributed to the development of the band. The NAF Staff band has represented Latvia in several international brass band festivals in many European countries such as Lithuania, Italy, and Belgium. On September 15, 2009, the band joined the Latvian National Armed Forces Staff Battalion.

== Purpose ==
The main purposes of the band are to:

- Play the national anthems of foreign countries during the state visits of high-ranking foreign officials.
- Take part in the accreditation of ambassadors in Riga Castle
- Play during parades and celebrations of national holidays

== Cooperation ==
Several foreign conductors have contributed to the professional growth of the band with concerts prepared and conducted by bandmasters from different countries.

- In mid-2015, the Chief Conductor of the band Dainis Vuskans conducted master classes for the Military Band of the National Guard of Georgia.
- The band performed with the CAF Central Band in the Latvian Song and Dance Celebration.
- It performs with other bands in the national armed forces such as National Guard Band and the Naval Band.

== Gallery ==
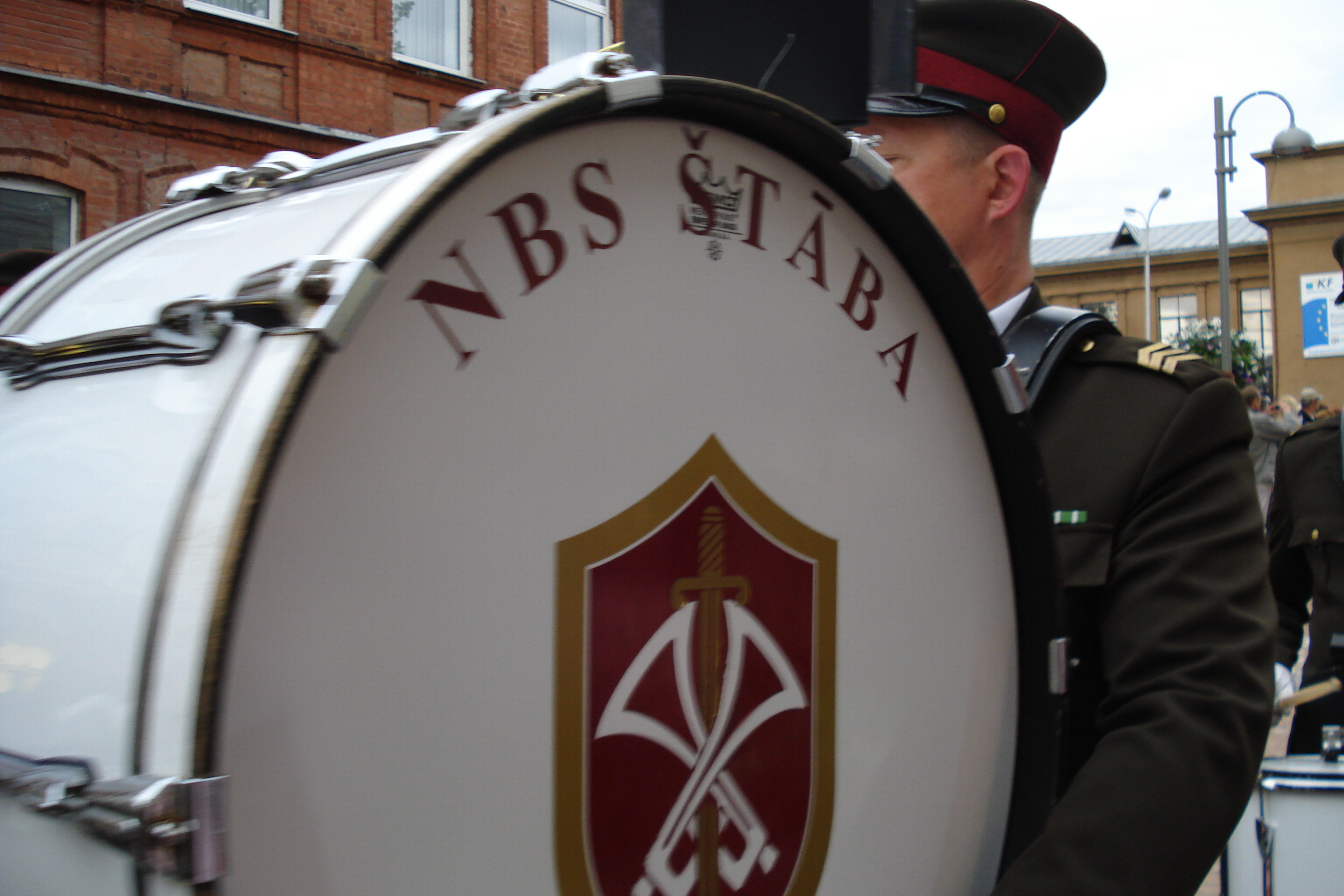

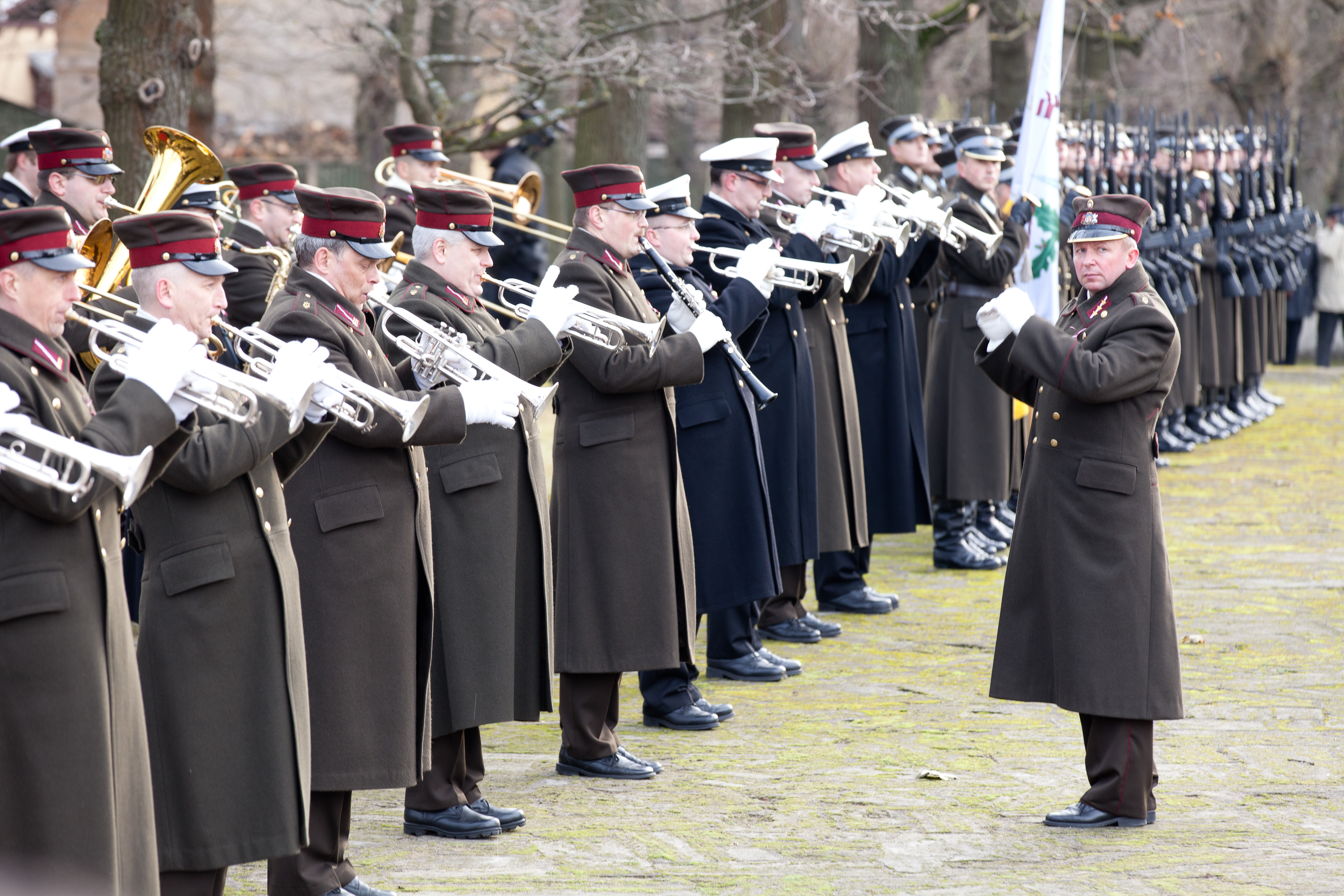

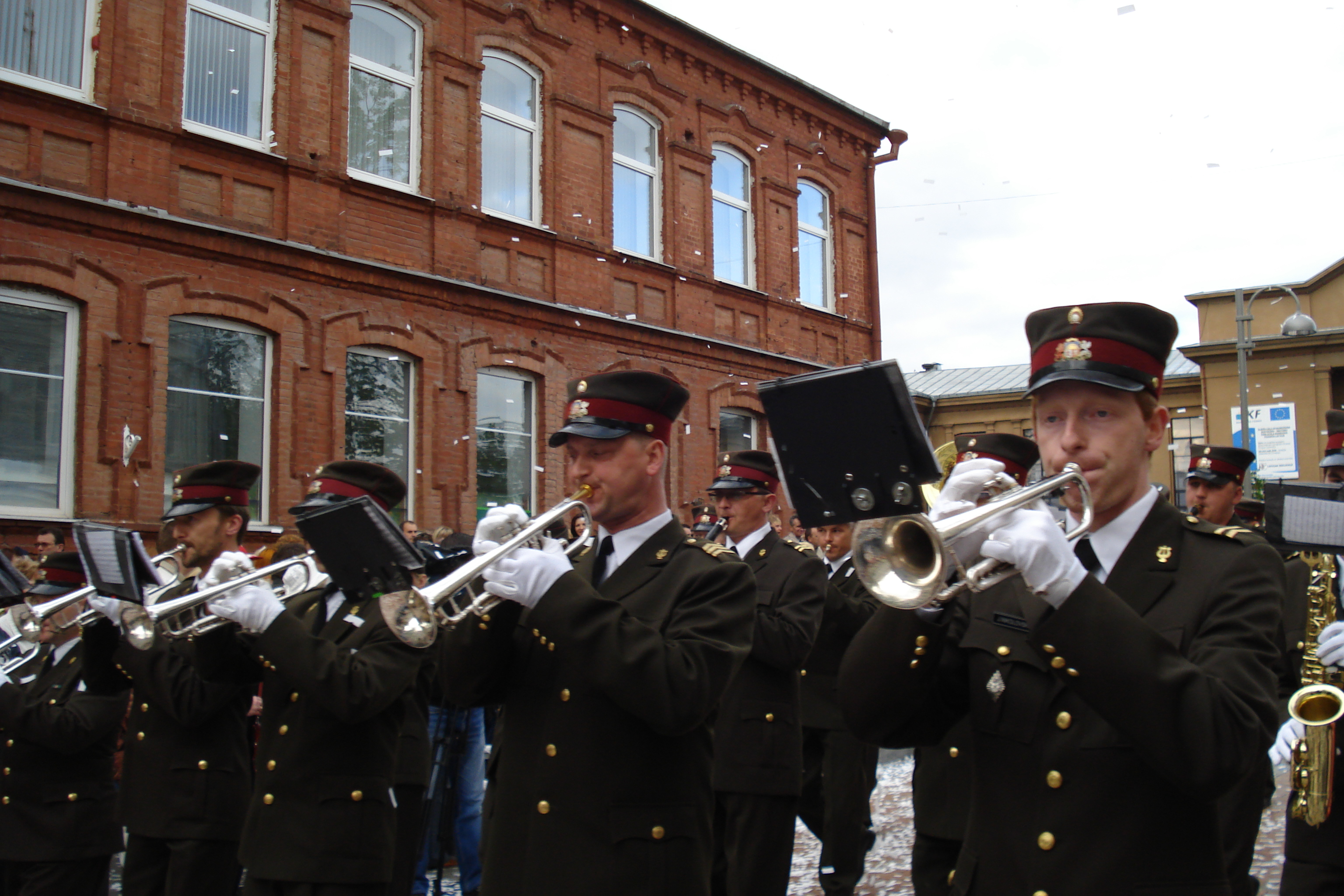

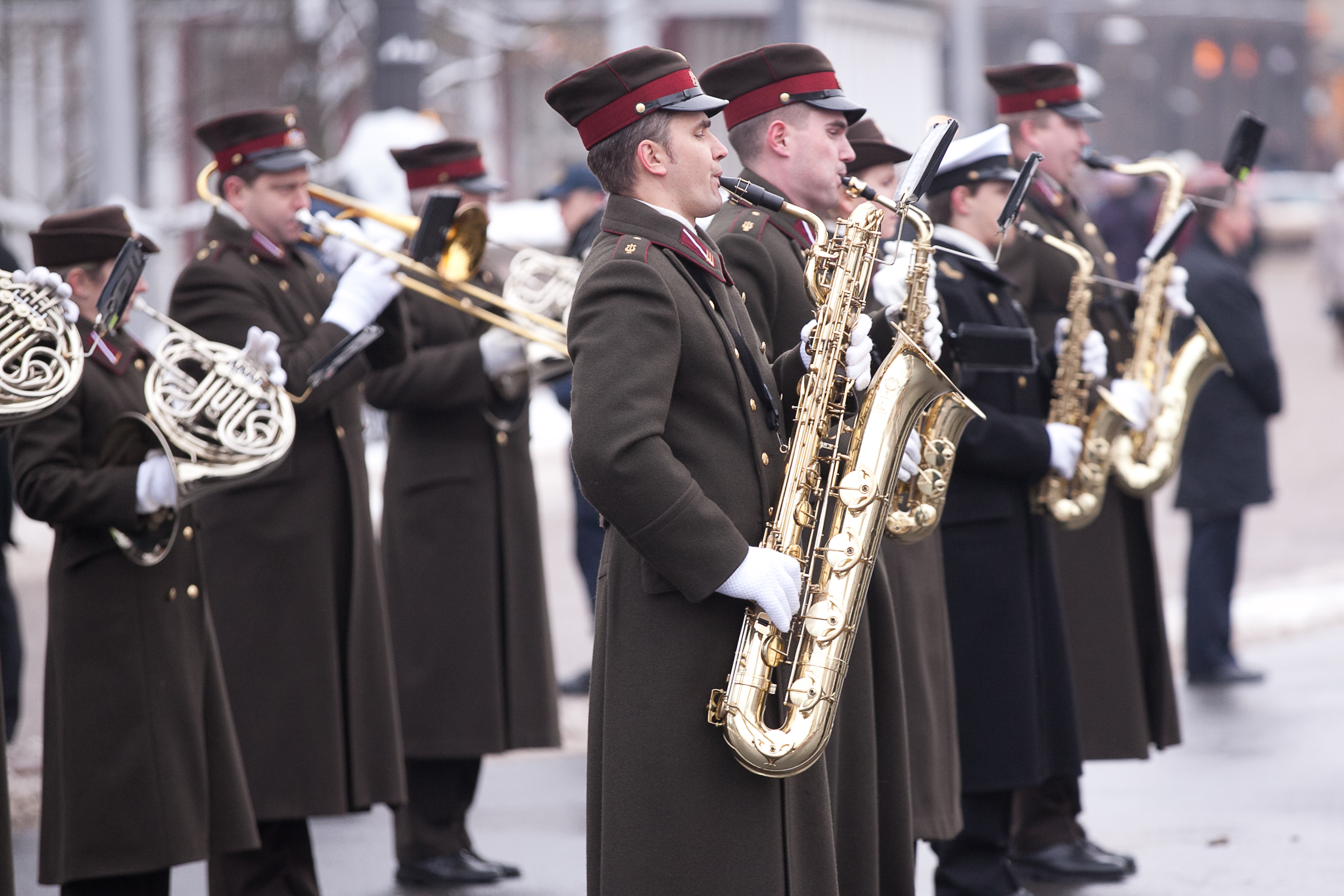

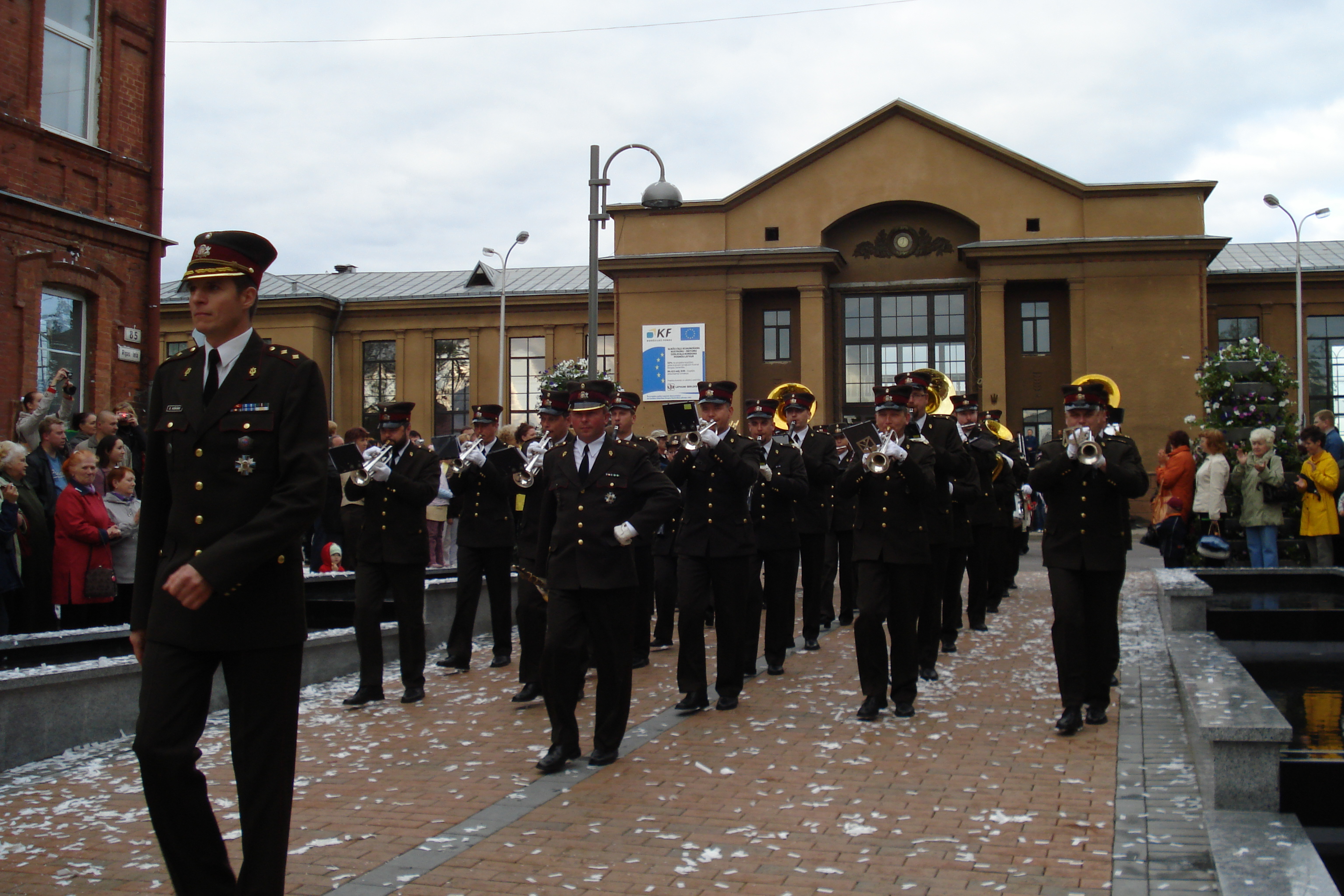
The band in the Daugavpils Town Festival in 2009.

== See also ==
- Military band
- Latvian National Armed Forces
- Latvian National Armed Forces Staff Battalion
- Kaitseväe Orkester
- Lithuanian Armed Forces Headquarters Band
