= Staff Battalion (Latvia) =

Latvian military unit

National Armed Forces Staff Battalion
- Nacionālo Bruņoto Spēku Štāba bataljons
- Insignia of the National Armed Forces Staff Battalion
- Active: 1919 - 1940; 1992 - present
- Country: Latvia
- Part of: Latvian National Armed Forces
- Garrison/HQ: Krustabaznīcas 11, Riga LV-1006
- Motto(s): Latin: Aut cum scuto, aut in scuto "Either with shield or on shield"
- Anniversaries: December 10 - established February 1 - restored

Commanders
- Current commander: Colonel Antoņina Bļodone

The National Armed Forces Staff Battalion (Latvian: Nacionālo Bruņoto Spēku Štāba bataljons) is a specialized battalion of Latvian National Armed Forces. Its main tasks are to ensure the security of the NAF Joint Headquarters, providing secure and uninterrupted communications to NAF units and participating in military ceremonies. The Battalion is directly subordinate to the Commander of the Joint Headquarters.

== History ==
=== 1919–1940 ===
Formation of the Army Commander's Staff began in July 1919. On July 16, the headquarters company of the Commander's Staff was established and Captain Jānis Otons was appointed as its commander. The official date of establishment is December 10, 1919. After the Latvian War of Independence, in 1921, the Commander-in-Chief ended his mandate and command headquarters of the Ministry of Defence was established instead of the wartime staff. On March 1, 1922, Lieutenant Ģirts Kunaus was appointed as the commander of the headquarters, however, he was replaced on May 1, 1923, by Captain Jānis Birzulis. Since 15 March 1923, the unit began guarding the Riga Castle and Saeima building. On August 1, 1923, the command HQ of the Ministry of Defence became the Head Staff Company. By the order of the Minister of War, the joint Head Staff Battalion was established on August 1, 1925, which also included the Head Staff Company. The joint battalion existed until 1931. In 1929, the Army Staff was established and on 23. September the Head Staff Company became the Army Staff Company. In 1931, the Army Staff Company came under the direct command of the Commander-in-Chief. On September 9, 1932, Captain Ģederts Rafaelis became the commander of the company. On November 9, 1933, the unit received its flag. On January 28, 1935, Lieutenant-Colonel Alberts Kleinbergs was appointed the commander of the company. Officers of the company started guarding the Freedom Monument on November 18, 1935. On April 1, 1936, the Army Staff Company became the Army Staff Battalion and was set up on December 10. In 1940, the Soviets occupied Latvia and began the dissolution of the Latvian Army. On July 17, 1940, Lieutenant-Colonel Alberts Vīksna became the last commander of the unit. Officers of the company ended their guard at the Freedom Monument on July 21. On October 22, the unit was abolished.

=== 1992 to present ===
The Headquarters Battalion was re-established on February 1, 1992, after Latvia restored independence. The Honor Guard Company was created on May 1, 1992, and the historical guard post at the Freedom Monument was restored on November 11. In 1995, the unit revived its historical flag. On July 1, 1996, the Defence Forces Staff Battalion became the National Armed Forces Staff Battalion. In 1999, a Signal Company was established. On November 11, 2002, the historic guard post at the Riga Castle was restored. On July 1, 2004, the orchestra of the battalion was removed from the unit. However, on September 15, 2009, the orchestra rejoined the battalion. In 2011, 10 officers from the battalion participated in international operations in Afghanistan.

== Structure ==
The National Armed Forces Staff Battalion consists of the following units:

- Battalion Headquarters
  - Personnel and Administration Section
  - Intelligence Section (S-2)
  - Operations Section (S-3)
  - Logistics Section (S-4)
  - Signals Section (S-6)
- Honor Guard Company
  - 1st Infantry Platoon
  - 2nd Infantry Platoon
  - 3rd Infantry Platoon
  - 4th Infantry Platoon
  - Fire Support Platoon
- Headquarters and Service Company
  - Headquarters and Service Support Group
  - Supply and Support Group
  - Signal Platoon
  - Security Platoon
  - Supply Platoon
- Radio Communications Company
  - Headquarters Group
  - Radio Control Section
  - Signal Platoon
  - Signal Support Platoon
- Radio Relay Company
  - Headquarters Group
  - Radio Relay Platoon
  - Mobile Command Platoon
- Medical Platoon
- Communications Support Center
- Central Military Band of the Latvian National Armed Forces

=== Honor Guard Company ===
The Honor Guard is responsible for guarding the Freedom Monument and Riga Castle, as well as representing and participating in military ceremonies. The ceremonies include military funerals, military parades and marches, opening of memorial plaques and monuments, and receiving foreign heads of state and ministers. If the President of Latvia is not present in Latvia, then the Riga Castle is not guarded. The company consists of a Headquarters and Service Support Group, four infantry platoons and a fire support platoon.

=== Central Military Band of the Latvian National Armed Forces ===
The NAF Central Military Band is responsible for performing music during visits of high-ranking officials, during ambassadors' appointment ceremonies, during NAF ceremonies, and during welcoming ceremonies of foreign warships. It also represents Latvia at international military orchestra festivals. The band has been active since 1991. The orchestra has two units: a Land Forces group and a Naval Forces group.

=== Headquarters and Service Company ===
The Headquarters and Service Company is tasked with supporting the operation of the battalion, organizing the administration and supply of the subunits, providing and maintaining the battalions communications, providing security for the battalion, collecting intelligence, organizing logistics. Support activities also includes repairing and maintaining the battalions equipment and providing catering. The unit consists of a Headquarters and Service Support Group, Supply and Support Group, Signal Platoon, Security Platoon, and Supply Platoon.

=== Radio Communications Company and Radio Relay Company ===
Radio Communications and Radio Relay companies are mainly tasked with ensuring continuous operation of communication networks. The formation of such unit began in 1991 under the National Guard and was led by Captain Harijs Zorģis. It later became the Communications Division. The Signal Company of the Staff Battalion was established in July 1999 at Stūnīši in a former Soviet base. In 2012, the National Guard Communications Division was joined with the Staff Battalion. After the merger, the unit was split into two companies - the Radio Communications Company and Radio Relay Company. The Radio Communications Company consists of a Headquarters Group, Radio Control Section, Signal Platoon, and Signal Support Platoon. The Radio Relay Company consists of a Headquarters Group, Radio Relay Platoon, and a Mobile Command Platoon.

== Cooperation ==
Several foreign conductors have contributed to the professional growth of the orchestra with concerts prepared and conducted by bandmasters from different countries. The NAF Staff band has participated in several international military brass band festivals in Europe with great success.

== Gallery ==
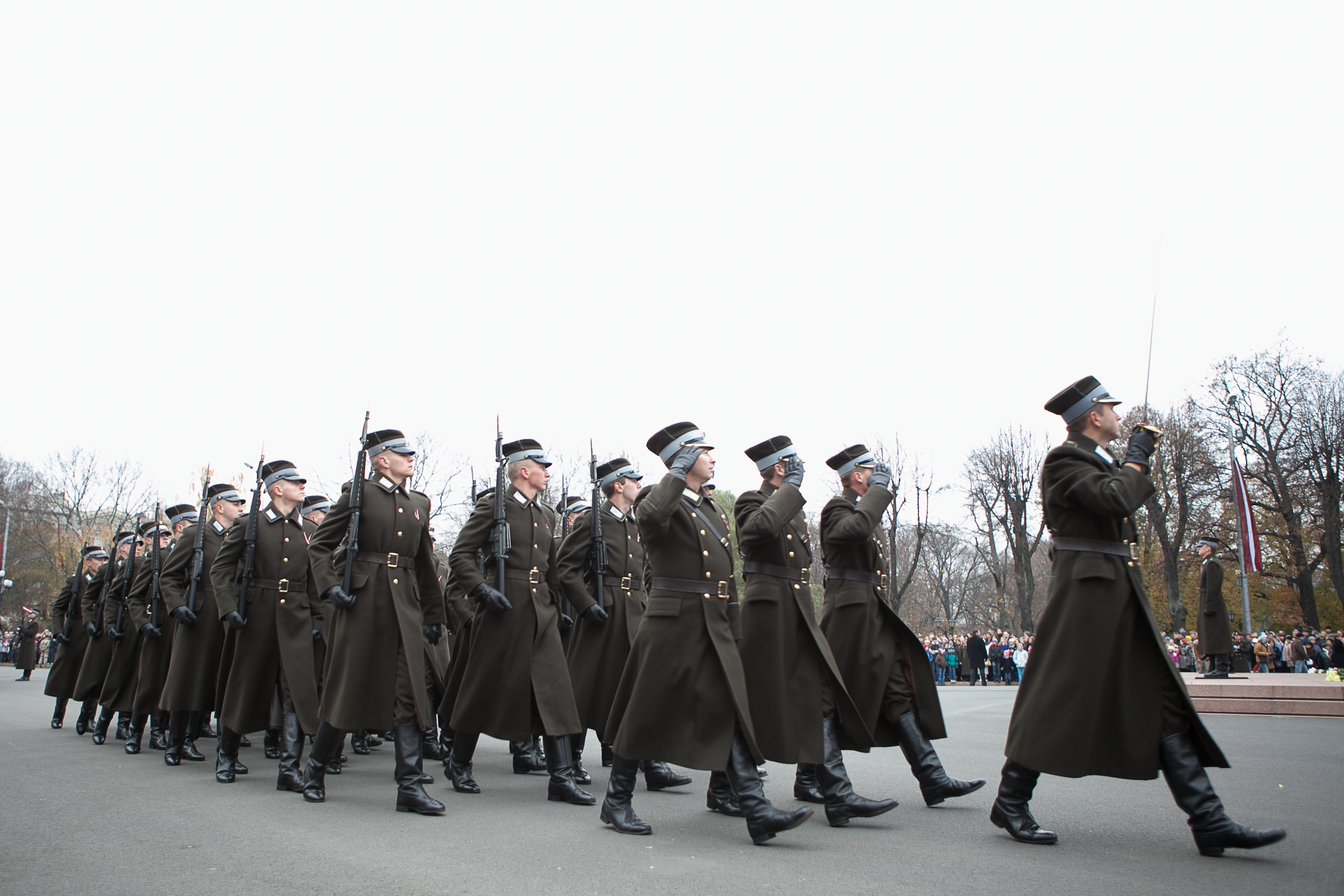
The battalion during a parade in Riga in 2011.

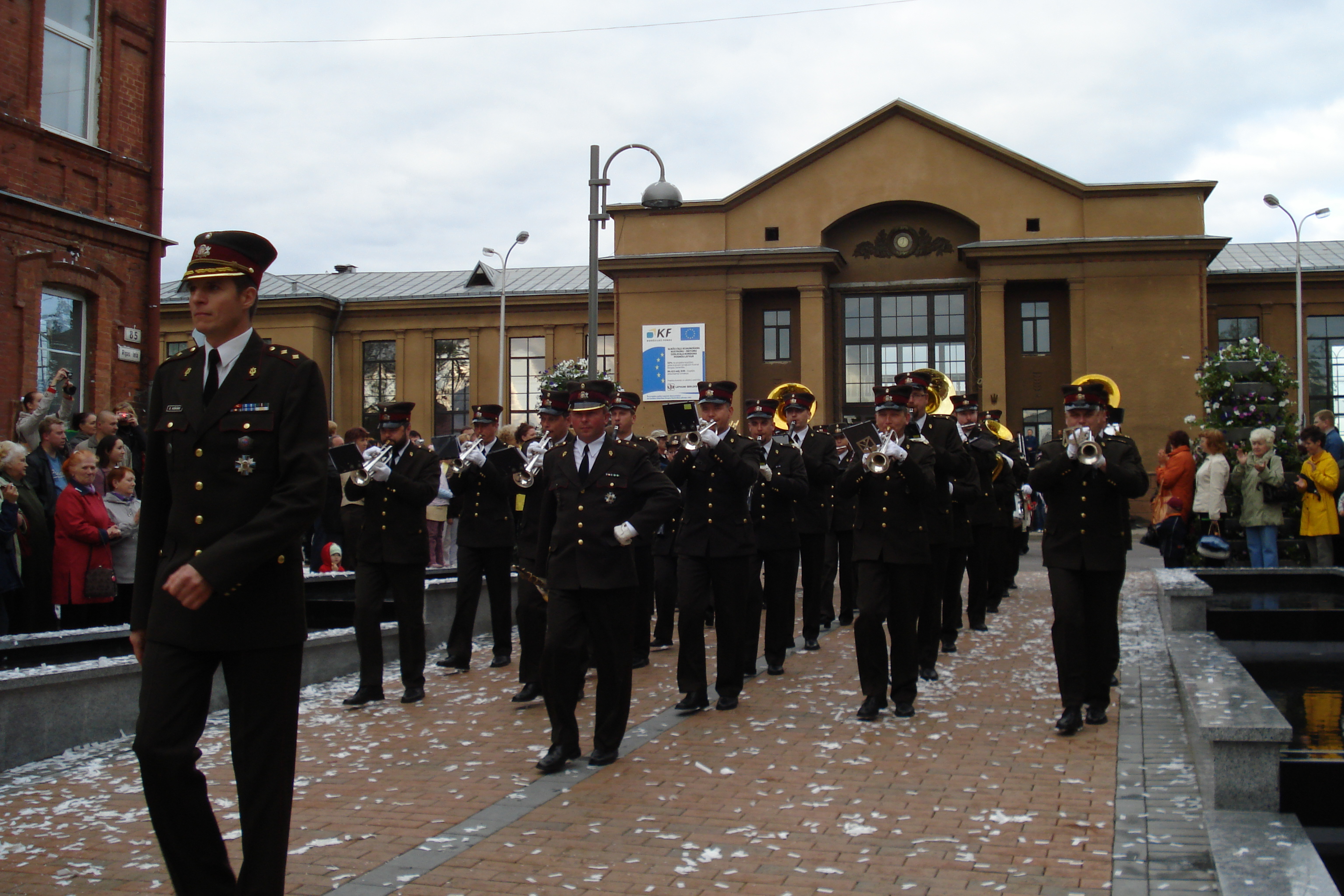
Staff Orchestra of the Latvian National Armed Forces.

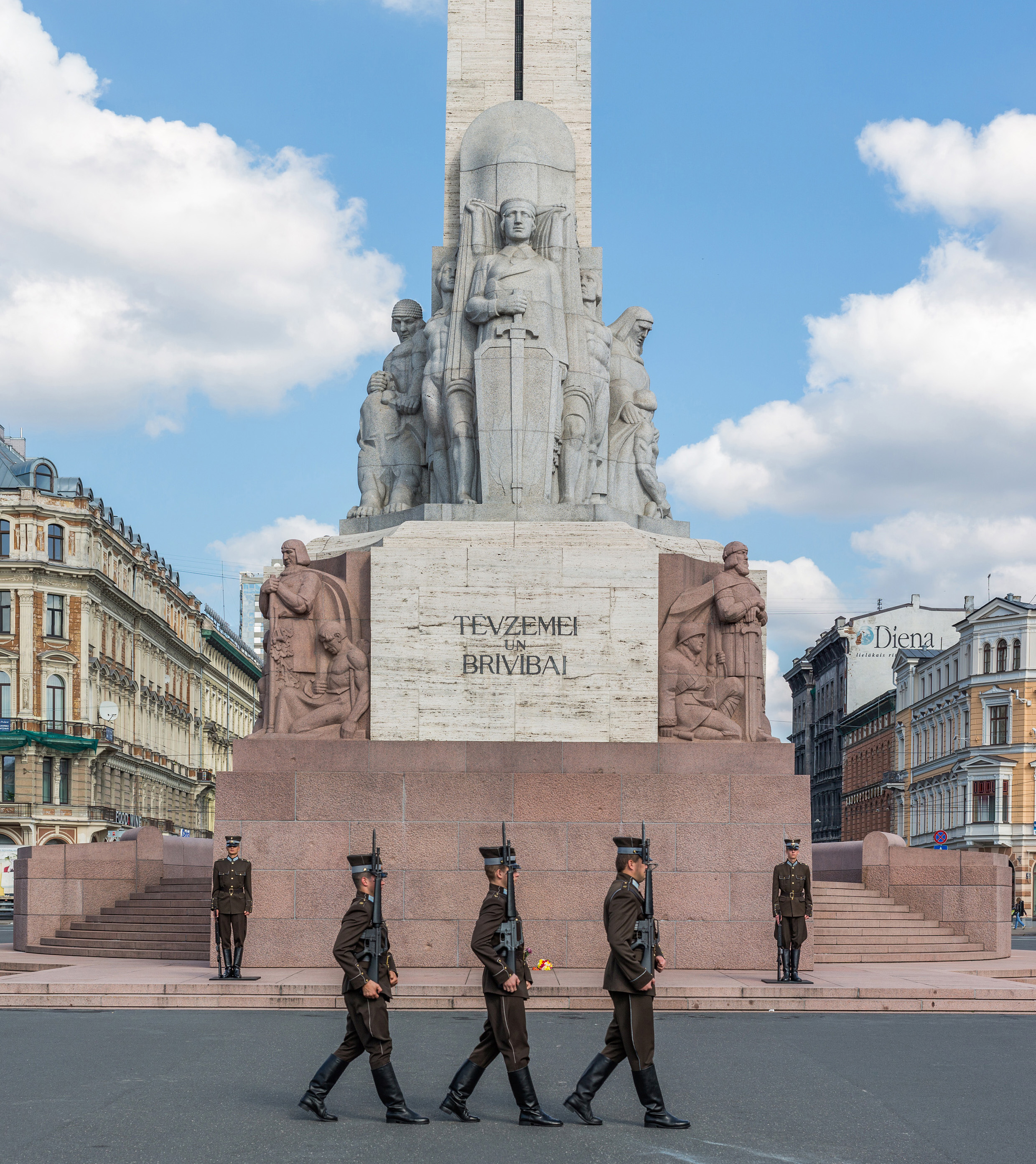
Soldiers of the battalion at the Freedom Monument in Riga.

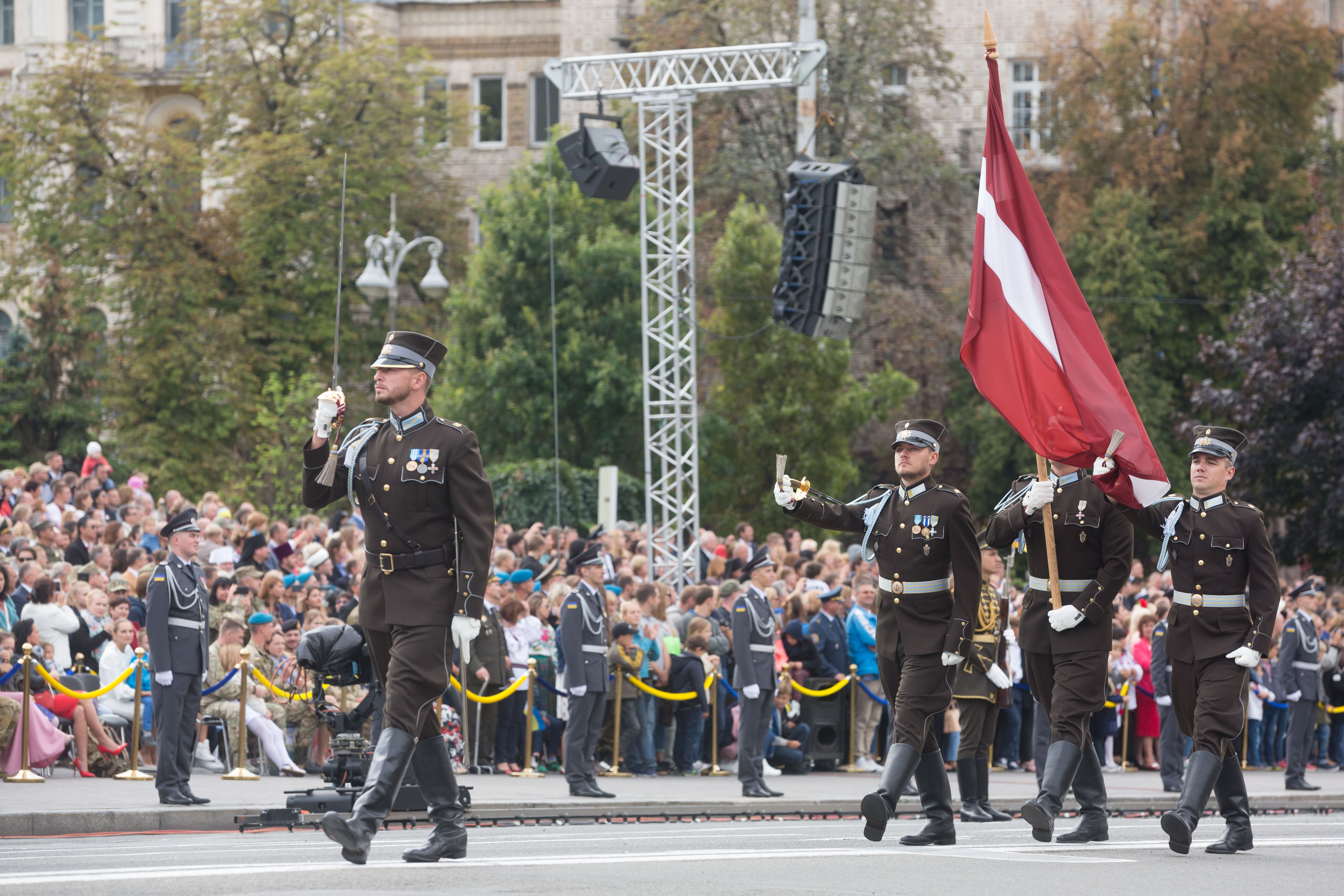
The troops of company during the 2017 Kyiv Independence Day Parade.

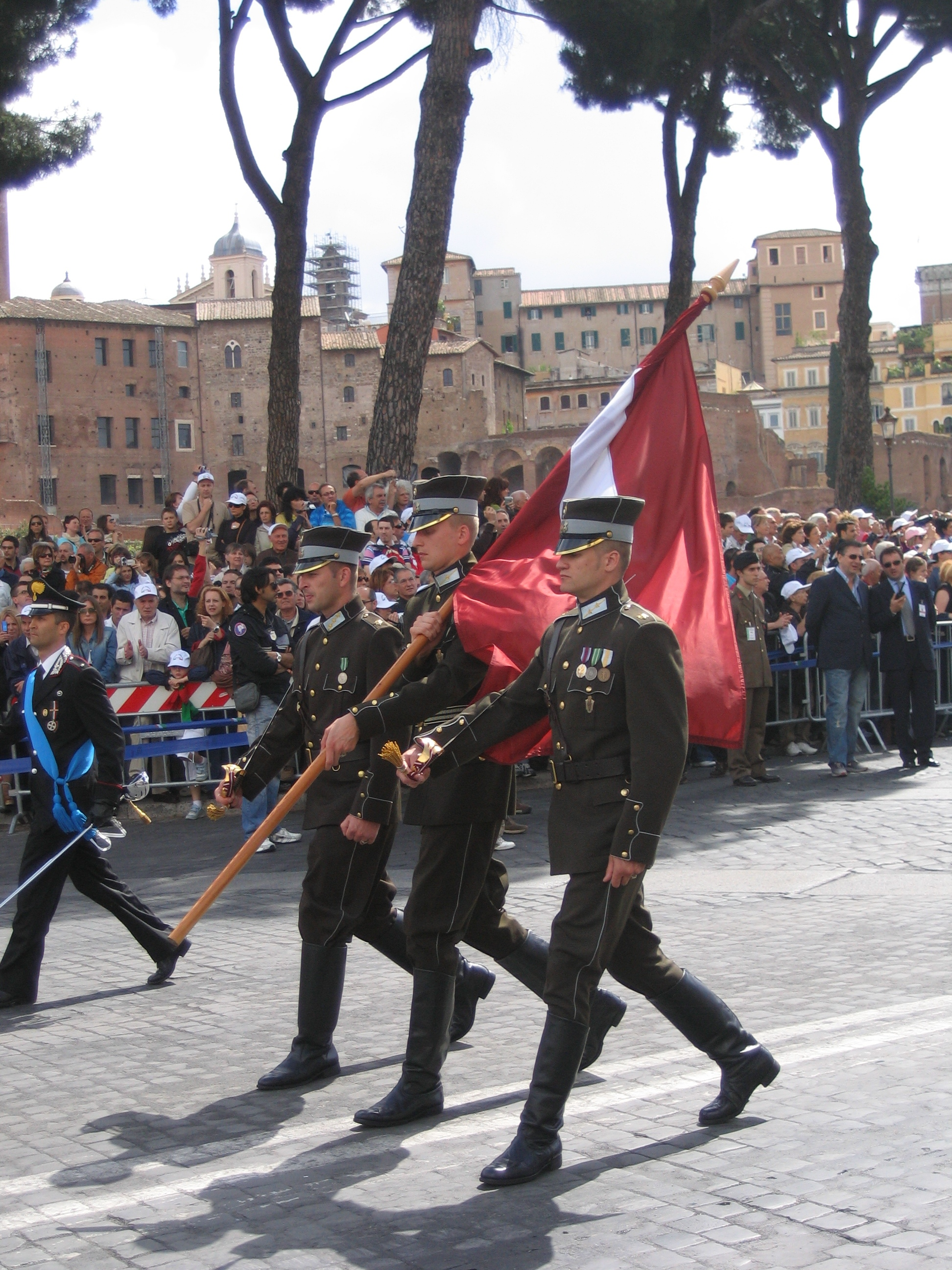
A color guard of the battalion representing Latvia during a parade in Italy in 2007.

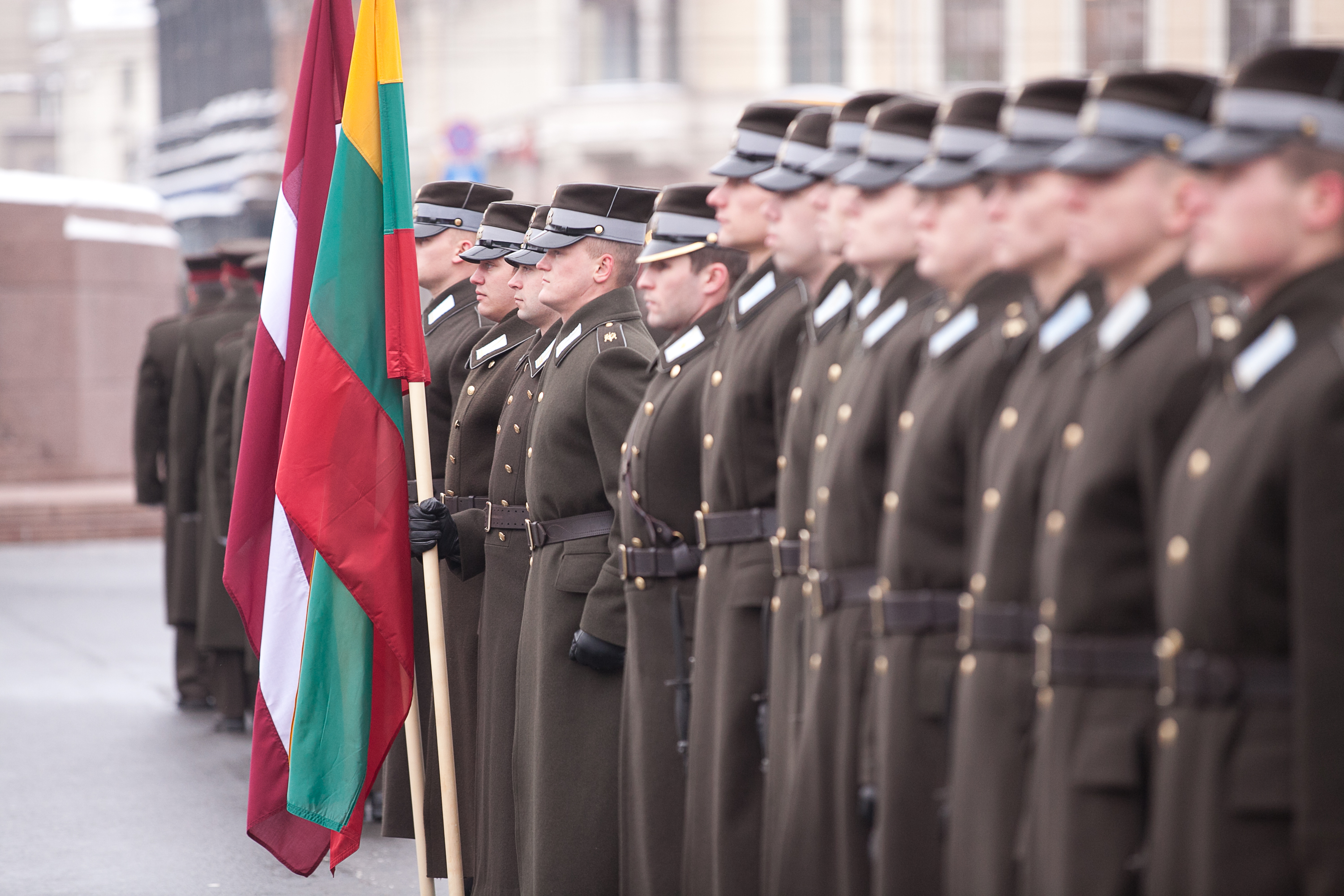
Members of the battalion welcoming the Chairman of the Lithuanian Parliament in Riga in 2012.

== See also ==
- Estonian Guard Battalion
- Grand Duke Gediminas Staff Battalion
