= Lithuanian Land Forces Band =

Musical unit in the Lithuanian Armed Forces

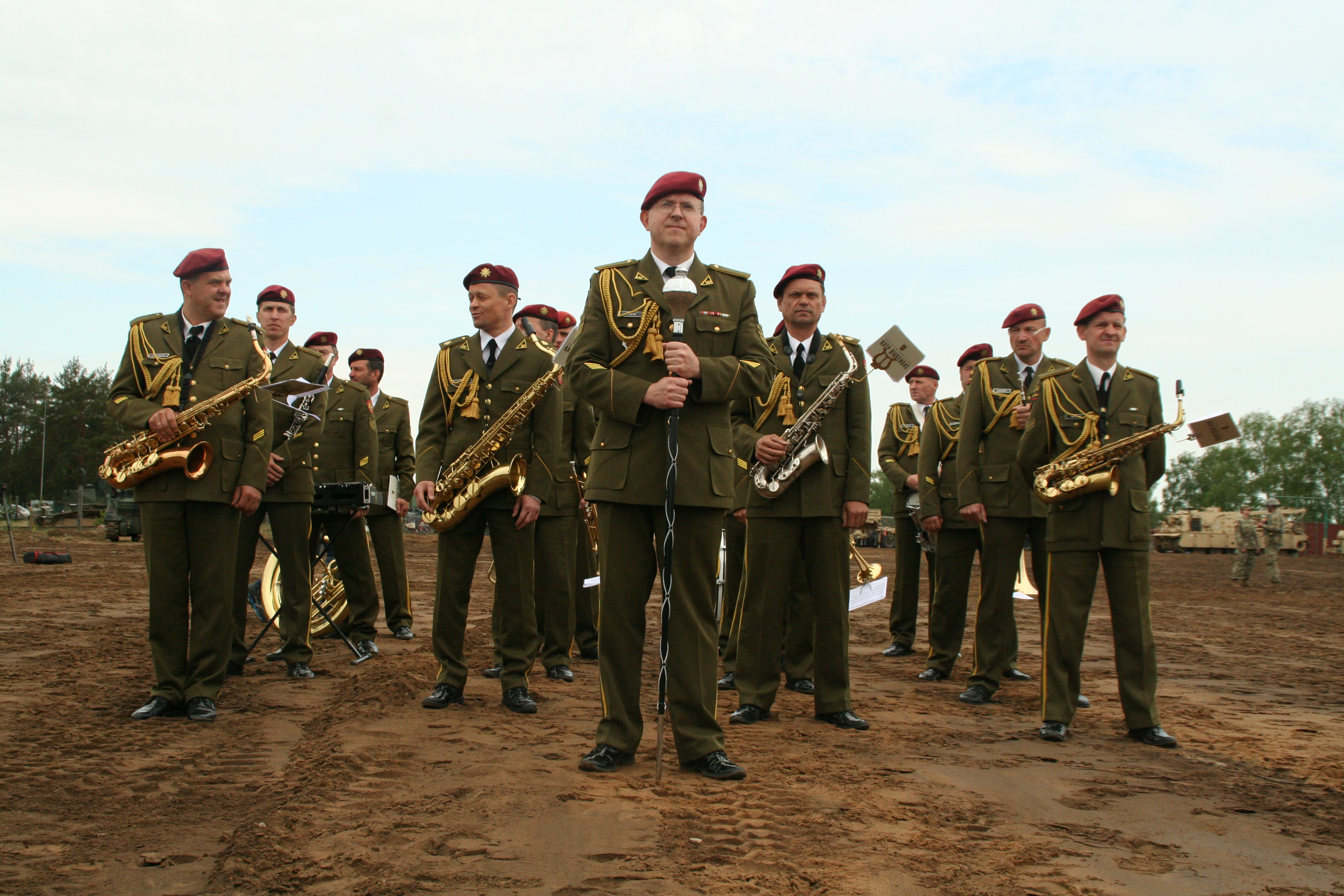
The Iron Wolf Military Band at the opening ceremony of Saber Strike 17 near Pabradė.

The Lithuanian Land Forces Band (Lithuanian: Lietuvos sausumos pajėgų orkestras) also informally known as the Iron Wolf Military Band, is a Lithuanian military band that serves as the official band of the Lithuanian Land Forces. It is officially attached to the Mechanised Infantry Brigade Iron Wolf, specifically the Grand Duchess Birutė Mechanized Uhlan Battalion in Alytus. It was established in the half of 1994. It is currently composed of 36 members of the land forces. It has taken part in many international festivals since it came into existence around the time of the Fall of the Soviet Union. Among these festivals are the Hamina Tattoo in 2008. It has also taken part in many municipal and regional events. Notable commanders also include General Justinas Jonušas (who later led the Lithuanian Armed Forces Headquarters Band) and Captain Viktoras Ščetilnikovas, who served the band until his death in 2019.

== See also ==
- Lithuanian Air Force Band
- National Defence Volunteer Force Big Band
