= Lithuanian Naval Force Band =

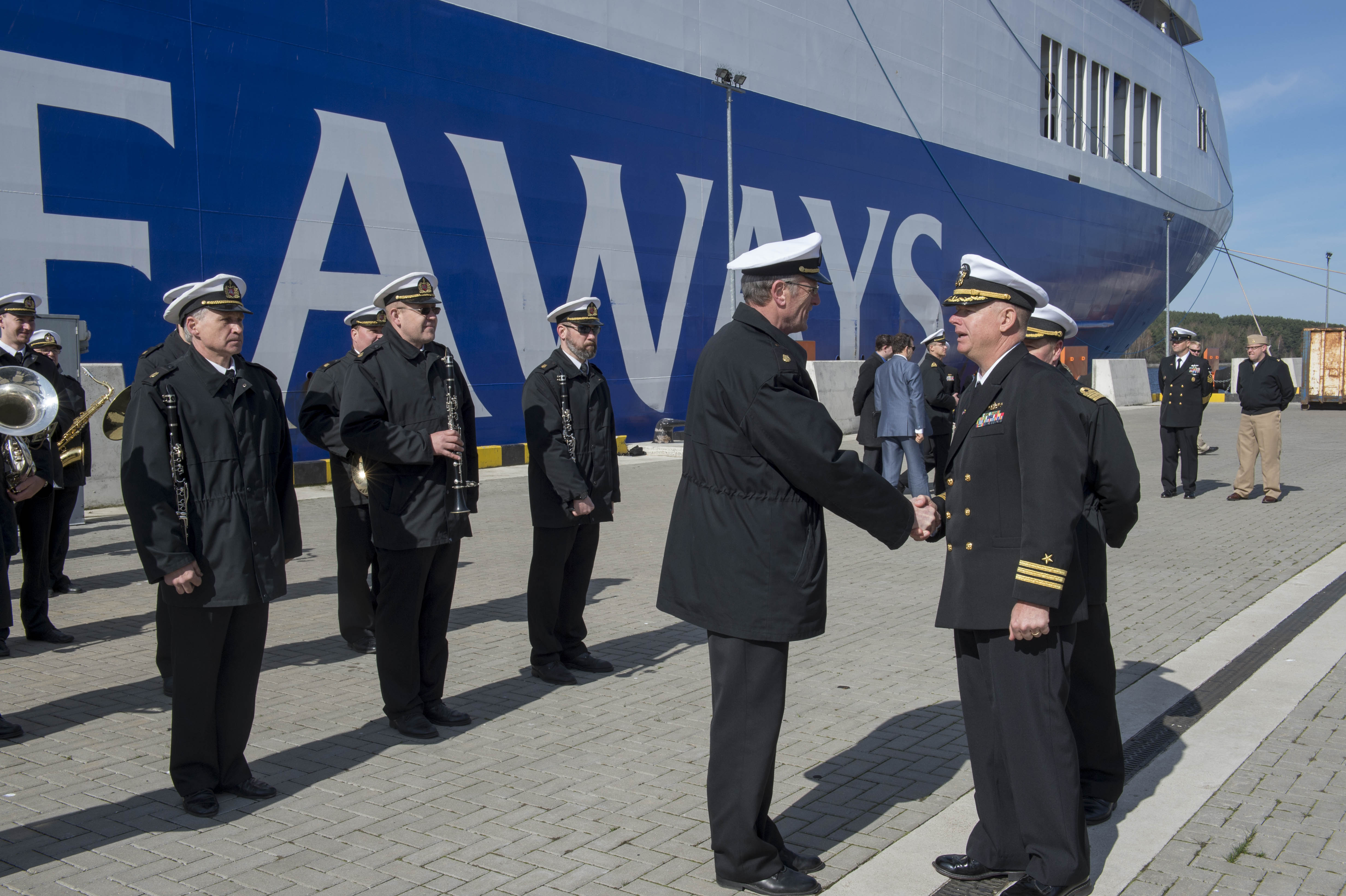
The bandmaster speaking with the commanding officer of the USS Donald Cook.

The Lithuanian Naval Force Band (Lithuanian: Karinių jūrų pajėgų orkestras) is an official military band in the Lithuanian Armed Forces. The band has been in existence since 1966, back when Lithuania was still known as the Lithuanian SSR in the Soviet Union. In Soviet times, it was a professional Klaipėda City Orchestra. Justin Jonuš was appointed as the first conductor at that time. In 1971, 1974, and 1977, the orchestra won the 2nd place in the LSSR's music competitions, and the 1st place in competitions of the same nature in 1979, 1980, and 1983. The band has been part of the National Defense System since 1 May 1998. It began its service in the Lithuanian Armed Forces as part of the 7th Grand Duke Butigeidis Coast Dragoon Battalion of the Lithuanian Land Force. In 2000, the band was transferred to the composition of the Žemaitija Motorized Infantry Brigade in Klaipėda, which was itself later reorganized into the Western Military District. On 1 July 2004, the military reassigned the band to the Lithuanian Naval Forces.

Today, the Navy Band, supports events in the City of Klaipėda and the surrounding counties. It participates in solemn ceremonies including military and state holidays, public and military events, and festivals on behalf of Lithuania and the Lithuanian Navy. It has given various concerts in the countries such as the Czech Republic, Slovakia, Hungary, France, and Germany. The repertoire of the group includes various orchestral and contemporary music of Lithuanian and foreign composers. The band celebrated its 50th anniversary in 2016.

== See also ==
- Lithuanian Armed Forces Headquarters Band
- Lithuanian Air Force Band
- Band of the Estonian Defence Forces
