= Aleksander Narcyz Przezdziecki =

Polish historian and publisher

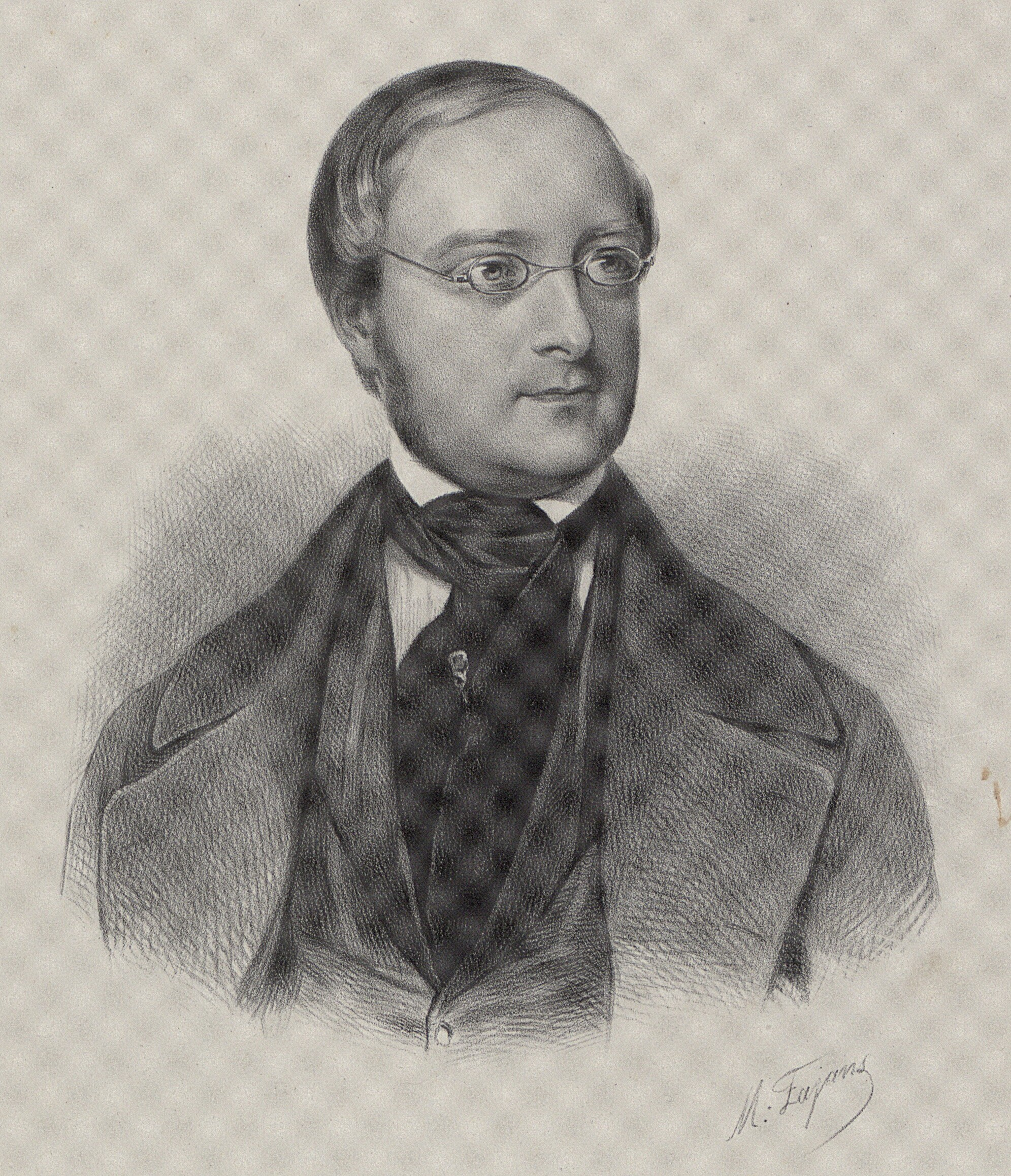
Aleksander Przezdziecki in 1850

Aleksander Narcyz Karol Przezdziecki (29 July 1814 in Chornyi Ostriv – 26 December 1871 in Kraków) was a Polish historian and publisher. Son of Konstanty Przezdziecki, and nephew of Karol Dominik Przezdziecki.
