= 20th Lithuanian Infantry Regiment =

- Active: July 1812 – December 1813
- Country: Lithuania (1812)
- Engagements: French invasion of Russia; Battle of Nowo Schwerschen; War of the Sixth Coalition; Siege of Modlin (1813)

Commanders
- First and only: Adam Biszping

20th Lithuanian Infantry Regiment – infantry regiment of the Army of the Duchy of Warsaw.

== 1812 ==
Formed in 1812 in Novogrudok (according to another source, Slonim) in the former lands of the Grand Duchy of Lithuania. Its commander from July 13, 1812, was Colonel Adam Bispink (Adam Biszping), Major Glazer, and the battalion commanders were Milberg, Walicki, and Płączyński.

== 1813 ==
The regiment took part in the defense of Modlin in 1813. As of May 1, 1813, the regiment's strength was 29 officers and 891 soldiers.

== 1814 ==
After Napoleon's abdication, Tsar Alexander I of Russia agreed to repatriate Polish–Lithuanian units. They were to serve as a base for the formation of the Army of Congress Poland under the command of Grand Duke Konstantin. On June 13, 1814, the regiment was assigned a concentration site in Łomża. However, the regiment was not recreated, as the new army provided for only 12 infantry regiments.

== Bibliography ==
- Gaidis, Henry L. (Spring 1984). Klimas, Antanas (ed.). "Napoleon's Lithuanian Forces". Lituanus. 30 (1). ISSN 0024-5089.
- Nafziger, George (2012). "Grande Armée, 1 May 1813" (PDF). Archived from the original (PDF) on 22 October 2020.

=== Polish-language sources ===
- Wimmer, Jan (1978). Historia piechoty polskiej do roku 1864. Warszawa: Wydawnictwo Ministerstwa Obrony Narodowej.
- Zych, Gabriel (1961). Armia Księstwa Warszawskiego 1807–1812. Warszawa: Wydawnictwo Ministerstwa Obrony Narodowej.

==== By Gembarzewski ====
- Askenazy, Szymon; Gembarzewski, Bronisław (2003). Wojsko Polskie: Księstwo Warszawskie 1807–1814 (in Polish). Poznań: Wydawnictwo Kurpisz. ISBN 8388841475.
- Gembarzewski, Bronisław (1925). Rodowody pułków polskich i oddziałów równorzędnych od r. 1717 do r. 1831. Warszawa: Towarzystwo Wiedzy Wojskowej.
- Gembarzewski, Bronisław (1964). Żołnierz polski. Ubiór, uzbrojenie i oporządzenie od wieku XI do roku 1960 (in Polish). Vol. 3: od 1797 do 1814 roku. Warszawa.
