= 21st Lithuanian Infantry Regiment =

- Active: July 1812 – December 1813
- Country: Lithuania (1812)
- Engagements: French invasion of Russia; Battle of Nowo Schwerschen; War of the Sixth Coalition; Siege of Modlin (1813)

Commanders
- First: Karol Dominik Przezdziecki
- Second: Antoni Giełgud

The 21st Lithuanian Infantry Regiment is an infantry regiment of the Army of the Duchy of Warsaw.

== History ==
=== 1812 ===
Formed in 1812 in Białystok, it was one of five infantry regiments in the former Grand Duchy of Lithuania, which was attempted to be reformed by the Lithuanian Provisional Governing Commission. The regiments were modeled after the Army of the Duchy of Warsaw, and their uniforms were also similar. However, they differed in the badges on their caps. Instead of the coat of arms of Poland (white eagle), they wore the coat of arms of Lithuania (white knight) and their cockades also differed from the Poles – they were white instead of the blue, white, and crimson of the Duchy of Warsaw.

=== 1813 ===
The regiment fought in 1813 in the defense of Modlin. As of May 1, 1813, the regiment's strength was 23 officers and 575 soldiers.

=== 1814 ===
After Napoleon's abdication, Tsar Alexander I of Russia agreed to repatriate Polish–Lithuanian units. They were to serve as a base for the formation of the Army of Congress Poland under the command of Grand Duke Konstantin. On June 13, 1814, the regiment was assigned a concentration site in Siedlce. However, the regiment was not recreated, as the new army provided for only 12 infantry regiments.

== Staff ==
- Regimental commanders:

Colonel Karol Dominik Przeździecki (from July 13, 1812)
Colonel Antoni Giełgud (from August 29, 1812).

- Regimental Major – Węgierski
- Commander of the 1st Battalion – Górski
- Commander of the 2nd Battalion – Andrychiewicz
- Commander of the 3rd Battalion – Łaszewski

== Bibliography ==
- Gaidis, Henry L. (Spring 1984). Klimas, Antanas (ed.). "Napoleon's Lithuanian Forces". Lituanus. 30 (1). ISSN 0024-5089.
- Nafziger, George (2012). "Grande Armée, 1 May 1813" (PDF). Archived from the original (PDF) on 22 October 2020.

=== Polish-language sources ===
- Tomaszewicz, Andrzej (2006). "Wojsko Wielkiego Księstwa Litewskiego w roku 1812". Nasz Czas (in Polish). 18 (692).
- Wimmer, Jan (1978). Historia piechoty polskiej do roku 1864 (in Polish). Warszawa: Wydawnictwo Ministerstwa Obrony Narodowej.
- Zych, Gabriel (1961). Armia Księstwa Warszawskiego 1807–1812 (in Polish). Warszawa: Wydawnictwo Ministerstwa Obrony Narodowej.

==== By Gembarzewski ====
- Askenazy, Szymon; Gembarzewski, Bronisław (2003). Wojsko Polskie: Księstwo Warszawskie 1807–1814 (in Polish). Poznań: Wydawnictwo Kurpisz. ISBN 8388841475.
- Gembarzewski, Bronisław (1925). Rodowody pułków polskich i oddziałów równorzędnych od r. 1717 do r. 1831 (in Polish). Warszawa: Towarzystwo Wiedzy Wojskowej.
- Gembarzewski, Bronisław (1964). Żołnierz polski. Ubiór, uzbrojenie i oporządzenie od wieku XI do roku 1960 (in Polish). Vol. 3: od 1797 do 1814 roku. Warszawa.
