= Cyber Defence Command (Lithuania) =

- Kibernetinės gynybos valdyba (KGV)
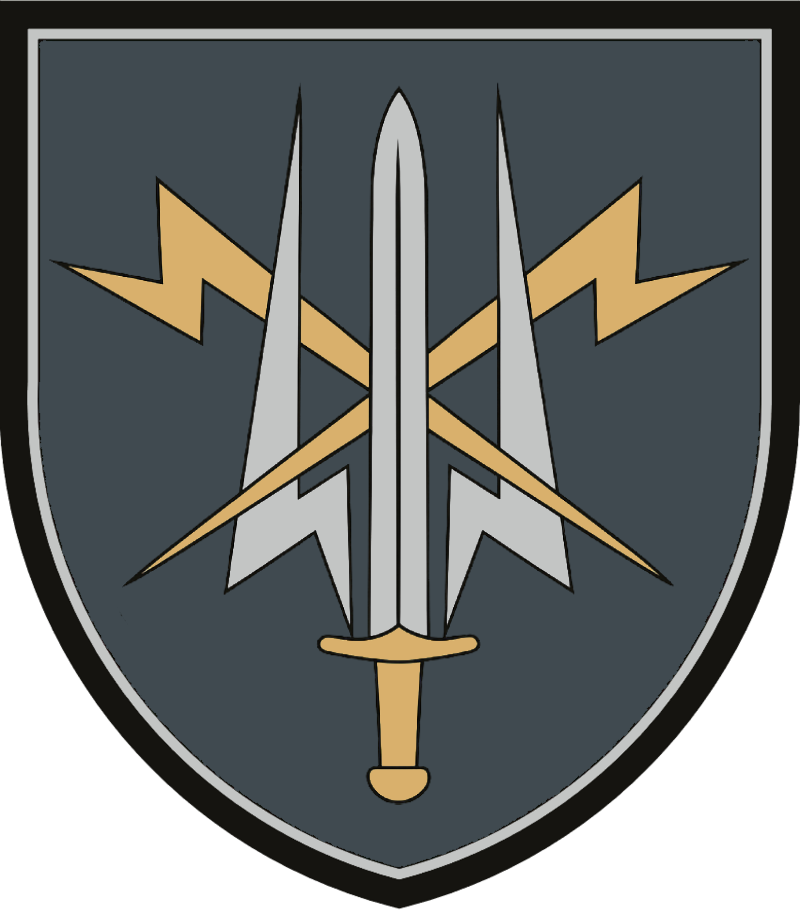
- Insignia of the LTCYBERCOM
- Active: 2025 – present
- Country: Lithuania
- Branch: Joint (Lithuanian Armed Forces)
- Type: Cyber and Signal Command
- Role: Cyber force
- Garrison/HQ: Vilnius
- Nickname: LTCYBERCOM
- Mottos: Ginti, aptikti, nugalėti! (Translation: "'Defend, detect, defeat!'")
- Colors: Grey
- Website: Official website

Commanders
- Current commander: Colonel Vytautas Sriubas

Insignia
- Battle flag

The Cyber Defence Command (LTCYBERCOM) (Lithuanian: Kibernetinės gynybos valdyba) is an information technology oriented formation in the Lithuanian Armed Forces, responsible for planning and execution of operations in cyberspace and installation of strategic and operational communications and information systems, identification, analysis and neutralization of cyber threats, as well as ensuring the resilience of the Lithuanian Armed Forces information systems against cyber attacks, also manages military radio frequencies, performs electromagnetic radiation measurements and provides other information technology services.

The Lithuanian Cyber Command (LTCYBERCOM) was established in July 2024 when the Seimas approved the amendment to the law on the principal structure of the Lithuanian Armed Forces tabled by the Ministry of National Defence.

== History ==
=== Interwar Period ===
In September 1927 in Šančiai, Kaunas, in place of the disbanded Technical Regiment (Lithuanian: Technikos pulkas) the Signal Battalion was established.

It maintained the military telephone network, communication during army training, trained liaison officers for the signal battalion itself as well as the whole Lithuanian army. The communications battalion was directly subordinated to the headquarters of the military technical troops (Lithuanian: Karo technikos dalių štabas).

The organizational structure of the Lithuanian army's infantry divisions also included signal battalions, but not as large in size as the army-level signal battalion. It was planned that during a war, the divisional signal battalion would consist of 426 soldiers. Such numbers meant that these battalions were to be half the size of the divisional battalion-level engineer or cavalry units. The infantry division's signal battalion consisted of a headquarters, a radio company, and a telephone-telegraph company.

In June 1940, after the Soviet occupation of Lithuania, the battalion was reorganized into the Signal Battalion of the Red Army's 29th Territorial Rifle Corps, while some soldiers were transferred to the communications battalions of the 179th and 184th Rifle Divisions.

=== Restoration of Independence ===
The origins of the restored communications of the Lithuanian Armed Forces emerged in the Signal Platoon of the Training Unit of the Department of National Defence. Later, communications units were formed in different military units as a regular part of the support structure of the unit headquarters.

=== Modern Era ===
On 1 January 2019, during a ceremony, the Communications and Information Systems Battalion (later named after the Grand Hetman of Lithuania, Kristupas Radvilas Perkūnas) was established on the basis of the three Communications and Information Systems Companies of the Lithuanian Grand Duke Gediminas Staff Battalion.

The Cyber Defence Command of the Lithuanian Armed Forces was established in July 2024 after the Seimas of the Republic of Lithuania approved the amendment to the Law on the Principle Structure of the Armed Forces proposed by the Ministry of National Defence, and officially began operations on 1 January 2025.

In order to develop the 1st Army Division of the Lithuanian Land Forces to its full operational capacity, the Ministry of National Defence proposed to supplement the LTCYBERCOM structure with an additional Signal Battalion, which will be intended to support the command of the First Division at the operational level. On 3 June 2025 The Seimas of the Republic of Lithuania approved the amendment to the Law on the Basic Structure of the Armed Forces proposed by the Ministry of Defence.

== Structure ==
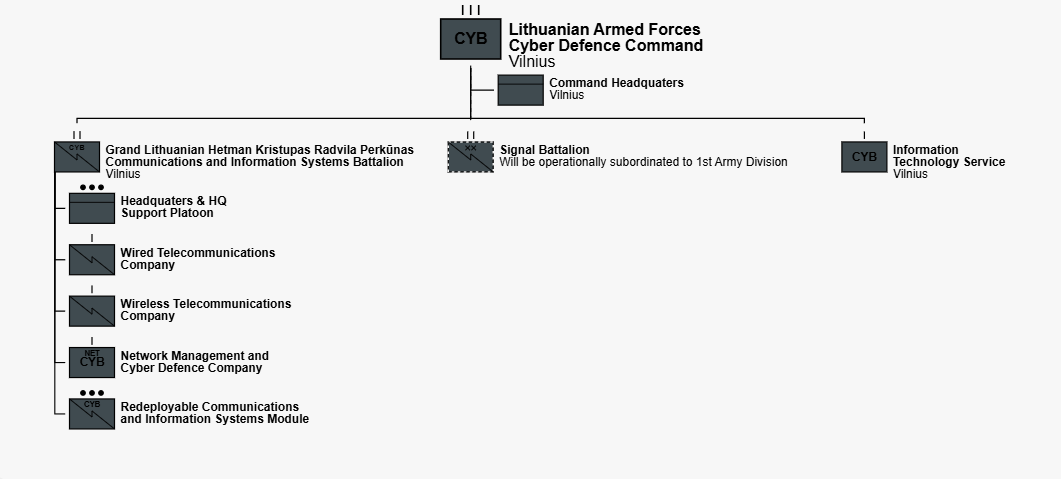
Lithuanian Cyber Command structure 2025 (click to enlarge)

The Cyber Command consists of a headquarters, Information Technology Service (IT service), Grand Lithuanian Hetman Kristupas Radvila Perkūnas CIS Battalion. Information Technology Service implements communication and information systems, including classified ones, to ensure their reliable functioning, cybersecurity, and interaction with the communication and information systems of NATO, the EU, the National Defence, and other institutions and organizations. Grand Lithuanian Hetman Kristupas Radvila Perkūnas CIS Battalion supports and provisions the communications and information systems of the State Defence Strategic Command (State Defence Council) and the Armed Forces Command (Defence Staff) in the designated area of operations, as well as the reliable functioning of redeployable communications and information systems, to create favorable conditions for the command and control of the State Defence. In order to develop the 1st Army Division of the Lithuanian Land Forces to its full operational capacity, a new Signal Battalion is planned.

Cyber Defence Command, in Vilnius

- Command headquarters, Vilnius
- Information Technology Service, Vilnius
- Grand Lithuanian Hetman Kristupas Radvila Perkūnas CIS Battalion, Vilnius
- Signal Battalion (Planned)

== Sources ==
- Vaičenonis, Jonas (2011-12-08). "Ryšių batalionas". vle.lt (in Lithuanian).
- Vasiliauskas, Edvardas (2022-10-02). "Lietuvos kariuomenės lygmens ryšių vienetai 1935–1940 m." Karo Archyvas (in Lithuanian). 37 (1): 91–157. doi:10.47459/ka.2022.37.3. ISSN 1392-6489. S2CID 252706075.
