= National Defence Volunteer Force Big Band =

Lithuanian musical group in the Lithuanian Armed Forces

The Lithuanian National Defence Volunteer Forces Big Band (Lithuanian: Lietuvos krašto apsaugos savanorių pajėgų bigbendas, KASPB) is a Lithuanian musical group in the Lithuanian Armed Forces. It was founded in 1991 as the first official wind band of the armed forces. Most of the band's members are graduates of the Lithuanian Academy of Music and the Vilnius Conservatory. The 30 musicians of the big band have performed all over the Eurasia region, in countries such as in France, Poland, Italy, Estonia, Latvia, Russia, Belgium and Afghanistan. Captain Ričardas Čiupkovas is the current band leader and director of music of the KASPB.

== See also ==
- Lithuanian National Defence Volunteer Forces
- Lithuanian Armed Forces Headquarters Band
- Lithuanian Air Force Band
