= 18th Lithuanian Infantry Regiment =

- Active: July 1812 – December 1813
- Country: Lithuania (1812)
- Engagements: French invasion of Russia; Battle of Nowo Schwerschen; War of the Sixth Coalition; Siege of Modlin (1813)

Commanders
- First and only: Aleksander Franciszek Chodkiewicz

18th Lithuanian Infantry Regiment – infantry regiment of the Army of the Duchy of Warsaw.

== 1812 ==
Formed pursuant to a resolution of the Confederation and the Grodno County of July 3, 1812, in Vilnius, Lithuania. Originally under the name of the 1st Lithuanian Infantry Regiment.

Its commander from July 13, 1812, was Colonel Aleksander Franciszek Chodkiewicz, Major Suhr, and the battalion commanders were Trębicki, Słupecki, and Roland. In July 1812, a large group of deserters and prisoners of war from the Imperial Russian Army joined the regiment.

On August 1, 1812, the regiment had 600 men, who were described as high-quality virtuous citizens.

== 1813 ==
The regiment took part in the defense of Modlin in 1813. As of May 1, 1813, the regiment's strength was 54 officers and 824 soldiers.

== 1814 ==
After Napoleon's abdication, Tsar Alexander I of Russia agreed to repatriate Polish–Lithuanian units. They were to serve as a base for the formation of the Army of Congress Poland under the command of Grand Duke Konstantin. On June 13, 1814, the regiment was assigned a concentration site in Bydgoszcz. However, the regiment was not recreated, as the new army provided for only 12 infantry regiments.

== Lineage ==
Lineage chart

1717
1795
1812
1813
1831
1831
1918
1919
1940
1993
1998

1st Lithuanian Infy Regt
Destroyed during the failed Kościuszko Uprising
18th Lithuanian Infy Regt
Fought at Modlin until the end
25th Lithuanian Infy Regt
Defeated during the failed Uprising of 1831
1st Infy Regt
1st Infy Regt of the Grand Duke of Lithuania Gediminas
Disbanded following the Soviet occupation of Lithuania (1940)
Separate Commandant Bn
Grand Duke Gediminas; Staff Bn

== Sources ==
- Gaidis, Henry L. (Spring 1984). Klimas, Antanas (ed.). "Napoleon's Lithuanian Forces". Lituanus. 30 (1). ISSN 0024-5089.
- Nafziger, George (2012). "Grande Armée, 1 May 1813" (PDF). Archived from the original (PDF) on 22 October 2020.
- kariuomene.lt (2021). "LDK Gedimino Štabo Bataliono istorija". Lietuvos kariuomenė (in Lithuanian). Archived from the original on 20 October 2021.

=== Polish-language sources ===
- Morawski, Ryszard; Paczuski (2009). Wojsko Księstwa Warszawskiego. Ułani, gwardie honorowe, pospolite ruszenie, żandarmeria konna. Warszawa. ISBN 9788361229032.
- Wimmer, Jan (1978). Historia piechoty polskiej do roku 1864. Warszawa: Wydawnictwo Ministerstwa Obrony Narodowej.
- Zych, Gabriel (1961). Armia Księstwa Warszawskiego 1807–1812. Warszawa: Wydawnictwo Ministerstwa Obrony Narodowej.

==== By Gembarzewski ====
- Askenazy, Szymon; Gembarzewski, Bronisław (2003). Wojsko Polskie: Księstwo Warszawskie 1807–1814. Poznań: Wydawnictwo Kurpisz. ISBN 8388841475.
- Gembarzewski, Bronisław (1925). Rodowody pułków polskich i oddziałów równorzędnych od r. 1717 do r. 1831. Warszawa: Towarzystwo Wiedzy Wojskowej.
- Gembarzewski, Bronisław (1964). Żołnierz polski. Ubiór, uzbrojenie i oporządzenie od wieku XI do roku 1960. T.3 od 1797 do 1814 roku. Warszawa.
