= Chornyi Ostriv, Khmelnytskyi Oblast =

Rural settlement in Khmelnytskyi Oblast, Ukraine

Chornyi Ostriv Чорний Острів
- Rural settlement
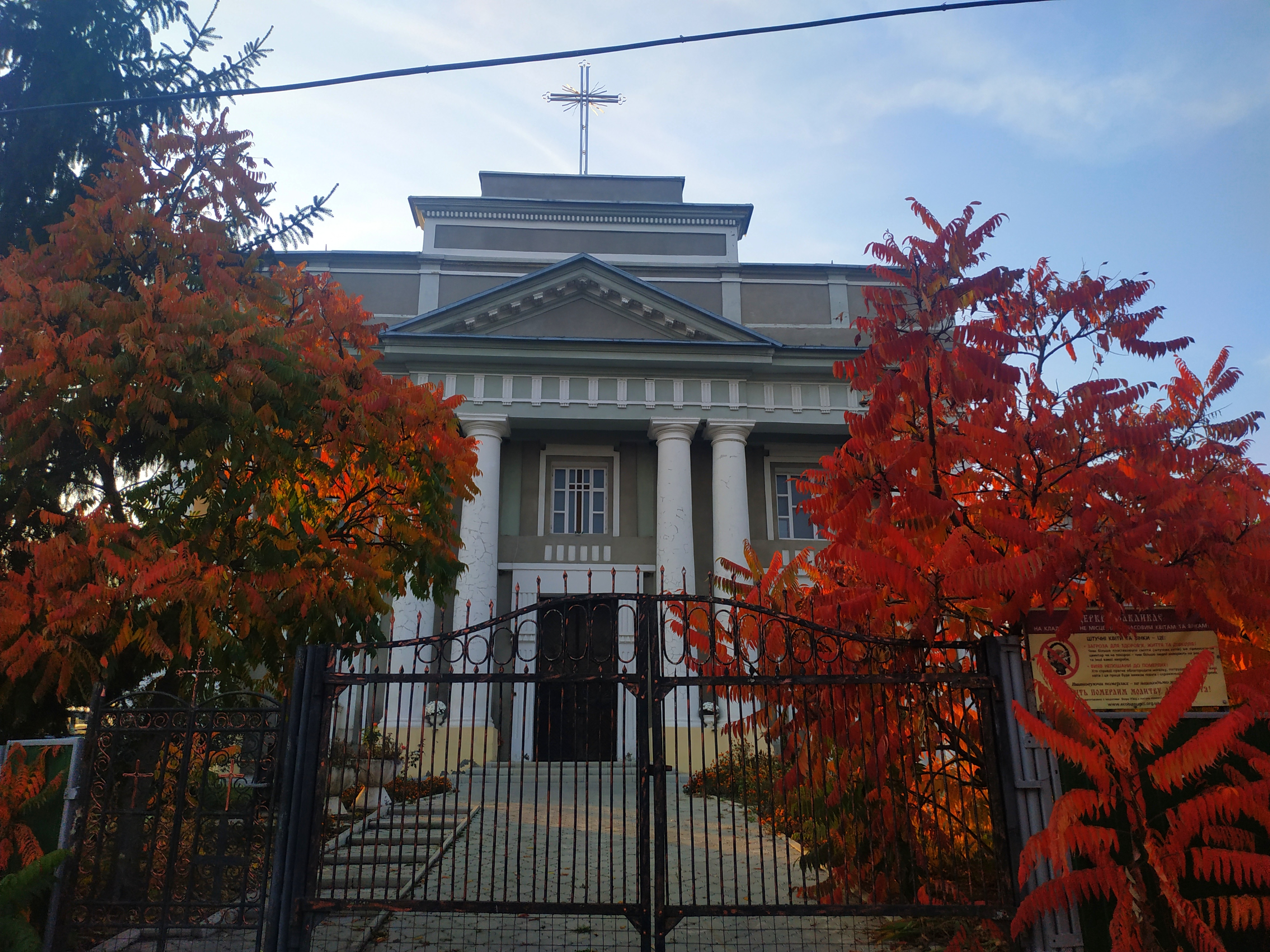

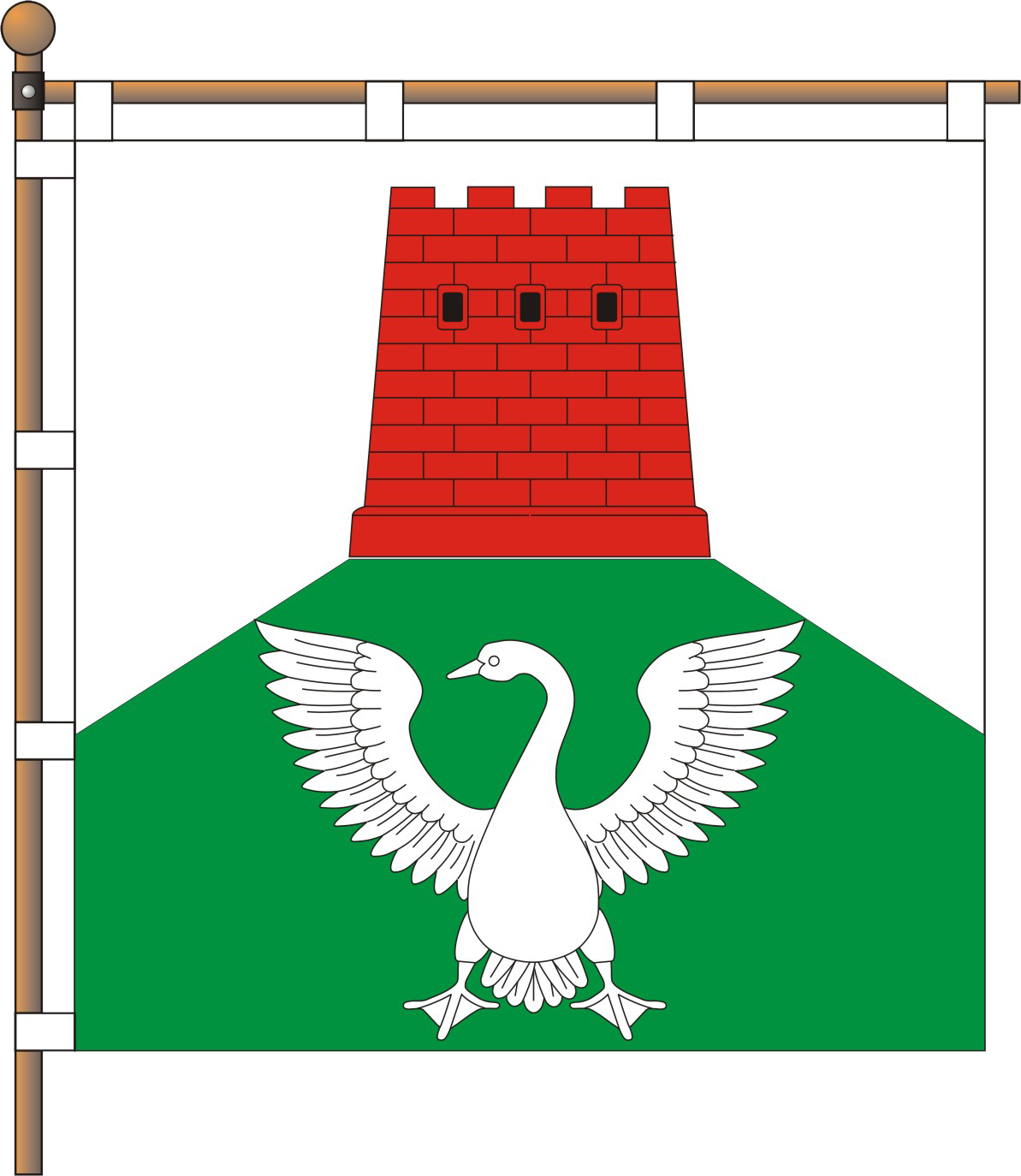
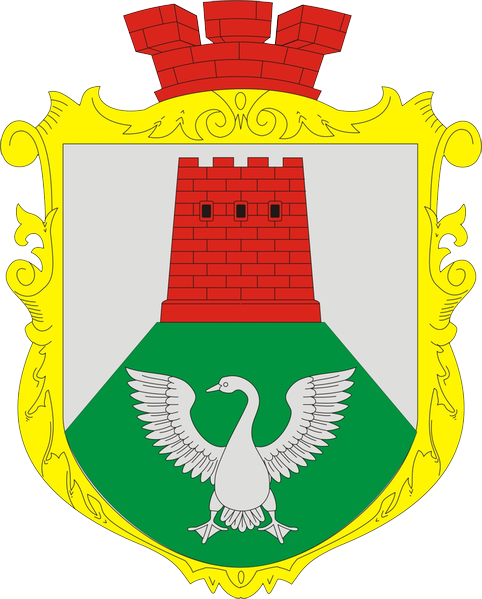
- Flag Coat of arms

- Location within Khmelnytskyi Oblast Location within Ukraine
- Coordinates: 49°30′25″N 26°45′56″E
- Country: Ukraine
- Oblast: Khmelnytskyi Oblast
- Raion: Khmelnytskyi Raion
- Hromada: Chornyi Ostriv settlement hromada
- Founded: 1366
- Town status: 1957

Government
  - Town Head: Anatoliy Parasyna

Area
  - Total: 6.23 km^{2} (2.41 sq mi)
- Elevation: 300 m (980 ft)

Population (2022)
  - Total: 902 ▼
  - Density: 145/km^{2} (375/sq mi)
- Time zone: UTC+2 (EET)
  - Summer (DST): UTC+3 (EEST)
- Postal code: 31310
- Area code: +380 382
- Website: http://rada.gov.ua/

Chornyi Ostriv (Ukrainian: Чорний Острів; Polish: Czarny Ostrów) is a rural settlement in Khmelnytskyi Raion, Khmelnytskyi Oblast, western Ukraine. It hosts the administration of Chornyi Ostriv settlement hromada, one of the hromadas of Ukraine. The town's population was 924 as of the 2001 Ukrainian Census and 902 (2022 estimate).

== History ==
Chornyi Ostriv was first founded in 1366, and it received the Magdeburg rights in 1556. Since 1957, it has the status of an urban-type settlement.

Until 26 January 2024, Chornyi Ostriv was designated urban-type settlement. On this day, a new law entered into force which abolished this status, and Chornyi Ostriv became a rural settlement.

== People from Chornyi Ostriv ==
- Aleksander Narcyz Przezdziecki (1814-1871), Polish historian
- Karol Dominik Przezdziecki (1782-1832), Polish count
