= Grand Duke Gediminas Staff Battalion =

Lithuanian Ceremonial unit

- LDK Gedimino štabo batalionas
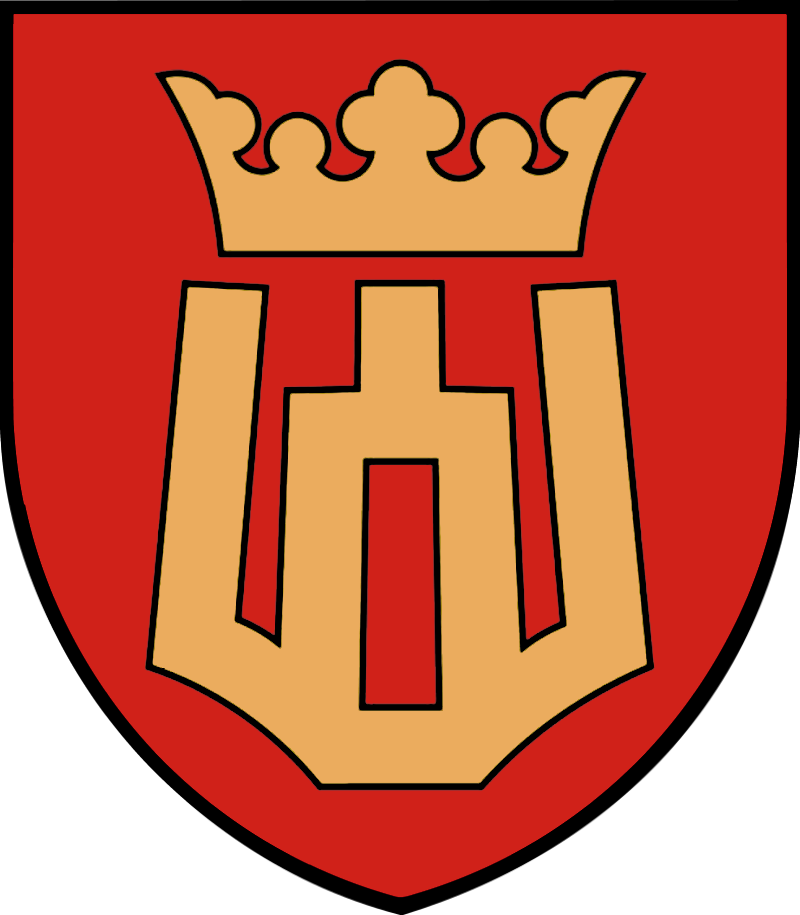
- Insignia of the Battalion
- Active: September 8, 1998 - Present
- Country: Lithuania
- Allegiance: Lithuania
- Branch: Lithuanian Armed Forces
- Type: Guard of Honor; Reinforced Battalion
- Garrison/HQ: Vilnius
- Patron: Lithuanian Grand Duke Gediminas
- Motto: Tegul meilė Lietuvos dega mūsų širdyse (Let the love of Lithuania burn in our hearts)
- Anniversaries: 25 August (Day of the Lithuanian Grand Duke Gediminas Staff Battalion); 28 November (Day of the Honour Guard)

Commanders
- Commander: Lieutenant Colonel Egidijus Čiūtas
- Chief of Staff: Major Vytautas Gudas
- Notable commanders: Lieutenant Colonel Saulius Juškevičius; Juozas Kačergius

Insignia
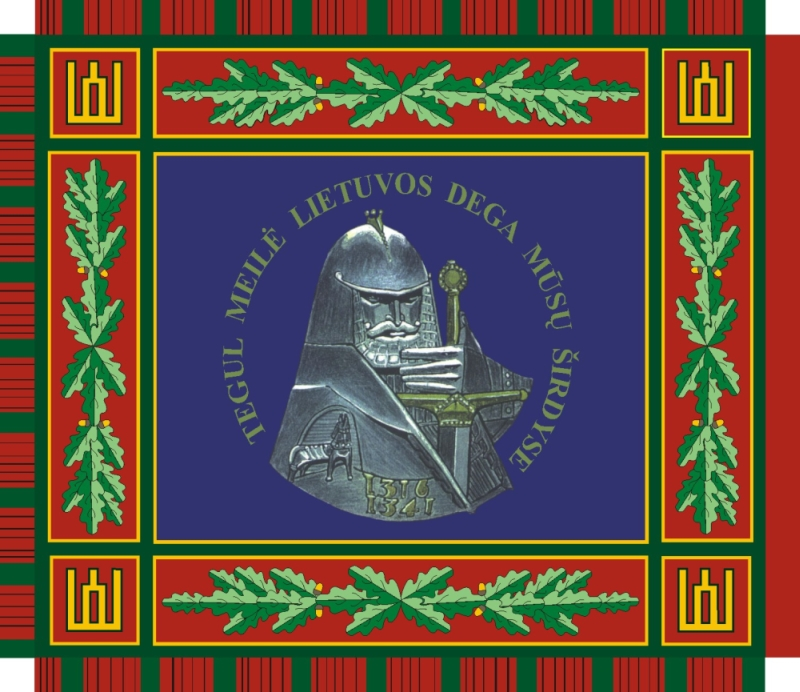
- Identification symbol

The Grand Duke Gediminas Staff Battalion (Lithuanian: Gedimino štabo batalionas) is a unit of the Lithuanian Armed Forces, whose staff it protects. It is also charged with representing Lithuania and its army by providing guard of honour at official events in Lithuania and abroad.

The battalion traditionally celebrates on 25 August, because on that day in 1919, the 1st Infantry Regiment with other Lithuanian Army units won the final victory against Soviet Russia at Zarasai during the Zarasai offensive.

The unit has a museum, which has functioned for more than 20 years.

== History ==
=== Interwar ===
The Grand Duke Gediminas Staff Battalion traces its history to the 1st Infantry Regiment and continues its traditions.

=== After the reestablishment of the Republic of Lithuania ===
On 5 April 1993, the Separate Commandant Battalion (Lithuanian: Atskiras komendantinis batalionas) was created to safeguard buildings and material possessions left by the Soviet Army that was leaving Lithuania. This battalion was first deployed to Aukštieji Paneriai, Vilnius. In 1997, the regiment's veterans asked President Algirdas Brazauskas to rename any unit of the Lithuanian Army after the Lithuanian Grand Duke Gediminas. So, on 8 September 1998, the Separate Commandant Battalion was renamed to the Grand Duke Gediminas Staff Battalion by order of the Minister of National Defence Česlovas Stankevičius, hence being granted the right to the traditions and insignia of the 1st Infantry Regiment. On 15 February 2002, the Battalion was solemnly bestowed a banner.

On 8 January 2019, the PRISM, wired and wireless communication company was separated from the Staff battalion and became the Communication and Information Systems Battalion.

== Composition ==
- Honour Guard Company
- Lithuanian Armed Forces Band
- Headquarters Provision Company
- Light Infantry Company
- Intelligence Support Centre

== Lineage ==
Lineage chart

1717
1795
1812
1813
1831
1831
1918
1919
1940
1993
1998

1st Lithuanian Infy Regt
Destroyed during the failed Kościuszko Uprising
18th Lithuanian Infy Regt
Fought at Modlin until the end
25th Lithuanian Infy Regt
Defeated during the failed Uprising of 1831
1st Infy Regt
1st Infy Regt of the Grand Duke of Lithuania Gediminas
Disbanded following the Soviet occupation of Lithuania (1940)
Separate Commandant Bn
Grand Duke Gediminas; Staff Bn

== Honour guard company and its public duties ==
The Honor Guard Corps of the Rapid Reaction Brigade, formed in the autumn of 1991, became the first unit to which conscripts were assigned. The soldiers who started the service that day were prepared within a few days and already on November 23 participated in the solemn parade of the Lithuanian Armed Forces. Liutauras Kavaliūnas was appointed the first commander of the Honor Guard Company. The Honor Guard Company has changed its location several times, operating in Vilnius, Rūdninkai and Nemenčinė. Over the nearly a third of a century since the founding of the Honour guard company, more than 5,000 Lithuanian citizens have served in it and has taken part in more than 9,000 ceremonies and reconstructions.

The company's uniform is based on examples from the interwar period. Today, the 98 soldiers and officers coming from three branches of the armed forces (Land Forces, Air Force, and Naval Force) use American M14 rifles.

=== Abroad ===
In 2003, after Lithuania's accession to NATO and the EU, soldiers of the Guard of Honor hoisted flags at the headquarters of both organizations in Brussels. In August 2016, the color guard took part in the Independence Day Parade in the Moldovan capital of Chișinău. As recently as 2019, it has participated in the Romanian Great Union Day parade on Piața Constituției (Constitution Square).

=== Silver jubilee (2016) ===
The Honour guard celebrated its silver jubilee in November 2016, during which a ceremonial parade of the unit was held in Daukanto Square near the Presidential Palace, attended by President Dalia Grybauskaitė. Grybauskaitė personally greeted the soldiers and said:

"These soldiers mirror our army. Each of them evokes a sense of pride and confidence not only here in Lithuania, but also beyond its borders."

== Historical Honour Guard ==
In 2006, the Honor Guard Company began implementing a new project, namely the creation of a historical guard of honor. For this, ten sets of the restored knight's armour were handed over to the honour guard. In 2009, this historical honour guard was formed from the honour guard company's soldiers. During demonstrations, the soldiers of the historical platoon put on the armor of the elite soldiers from the 14th-century Lithuanian Grand Ducal Army. During every year since 2009, the company's soldiers partake in the reenactment of the Battle of Grunwald in Poland, the largest medieval event in Europe.

== Armed Forces Band ==
The Lithuanian Armed Forces Headquarters Band is one of the five professional military bands based in Lithuania. It is the largest professional military band in Lithuania. It was founded on 4 September 1991 by Kapellmeister Major Justinas Jonušas (1938–2013) and was made up of 57 civilian and military musicians. The main purpose of the band is to participate in official welcoming ceremonies for high ranking foreign guests. On special occasions, the band wears historical 18th-century uniforms of the Lithuanian Guard Infantry Regiment.

== Heraldry ==
=== Banner ===
The back of the battle banner of the headquarters battalion of the Grand Duke of Lithuania Gediminas is blue with a wide red border, in the middle there is a silver image of Gediminas (stylized by Vytautas Kashuba), in an arc accompanied by the motto: "Tegul meilė Lietuvos dega mūsų širdyse" (Let the love of Lithuania burn in our hearts). Along the banner's edges are garlands of green oak leaves. The fringe is red with green.

=== Badge ===
A golden knight's helmet, decorated with a crown with a mantle of acanthus leaves and wings depicting the Columns of Gediminas (Gothic version).

== Gallery ==
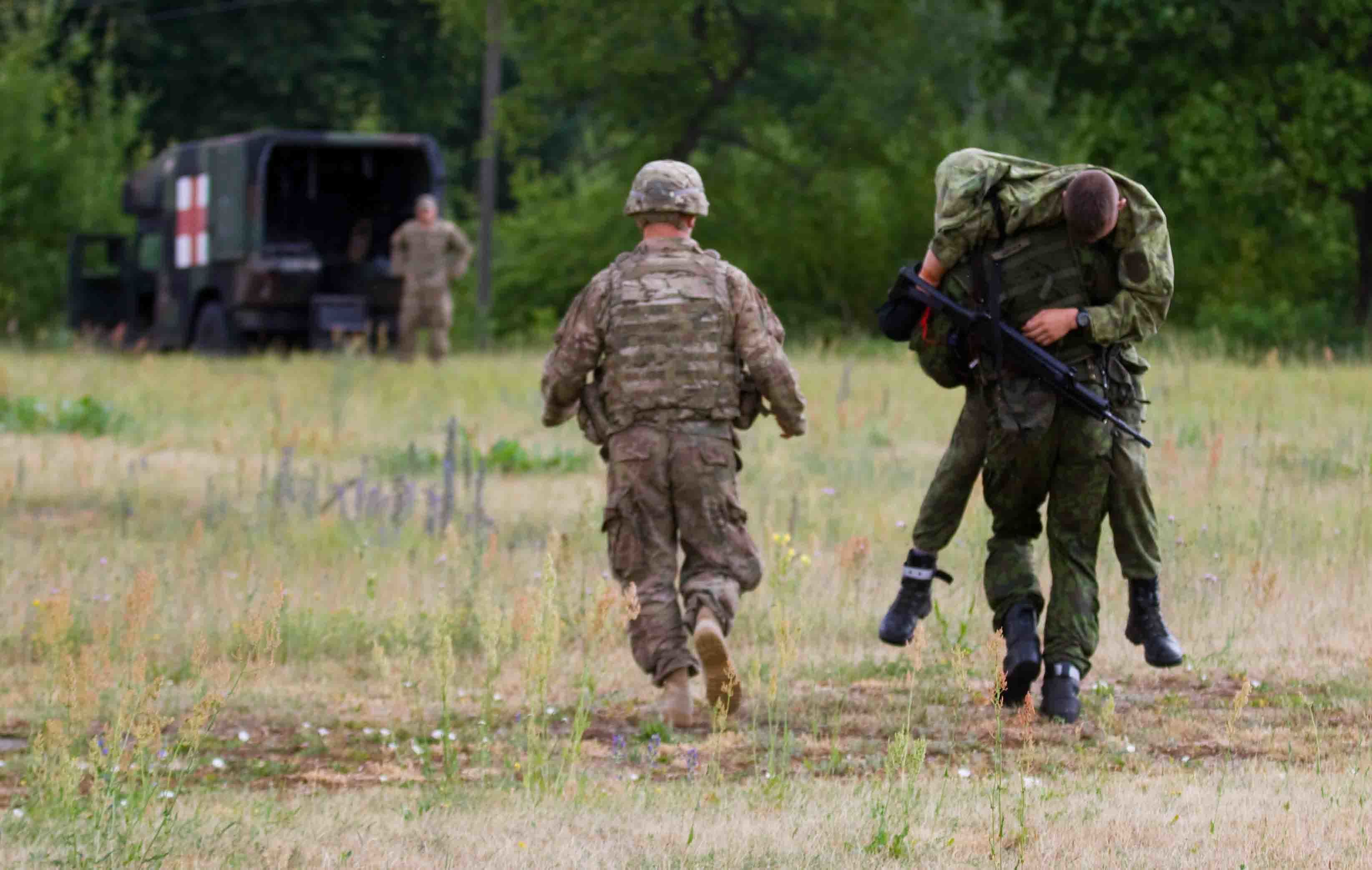
Members of the regiment training with dogs.

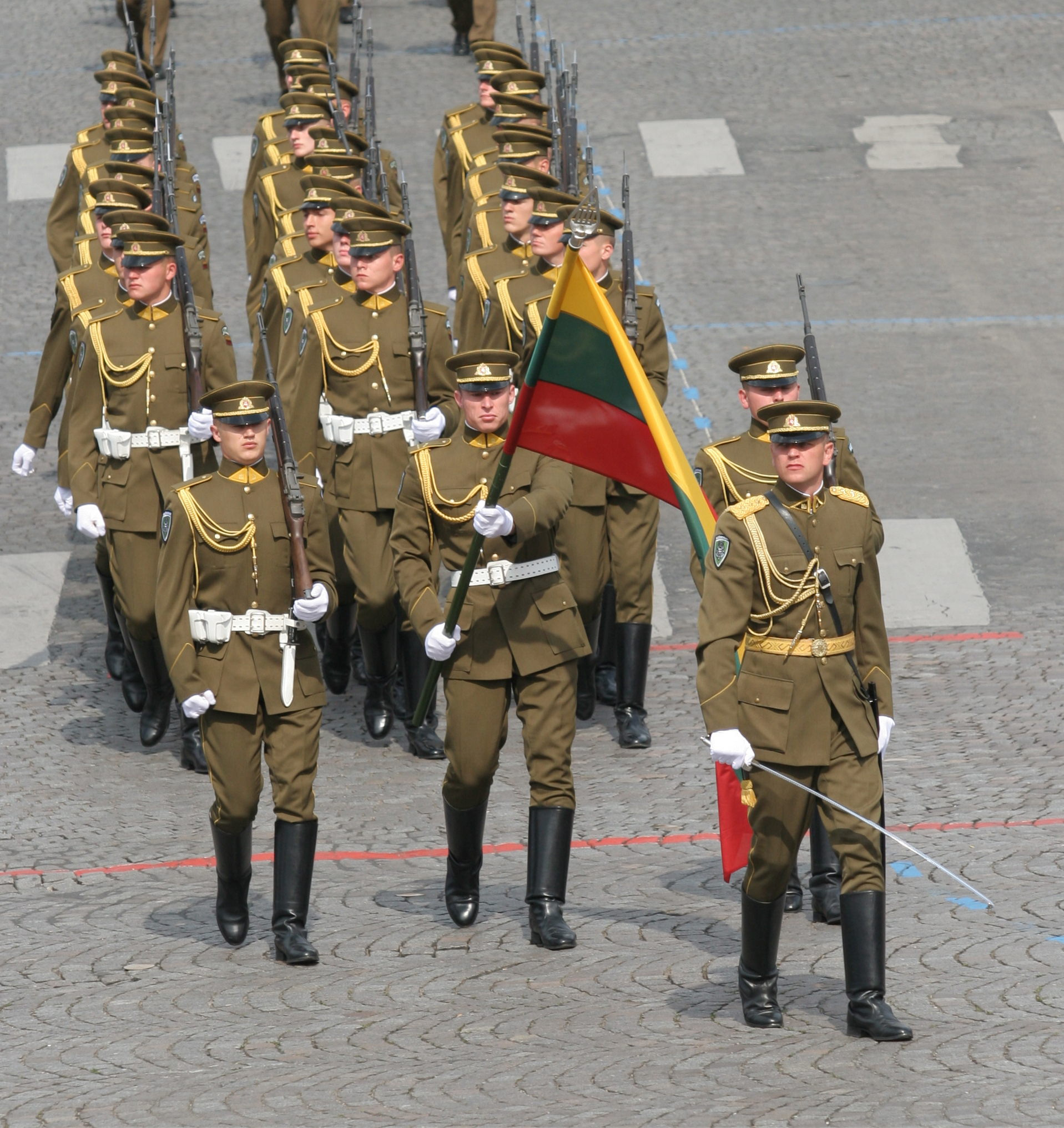
The honor guard company during the 2007 Bastille Day Parade.

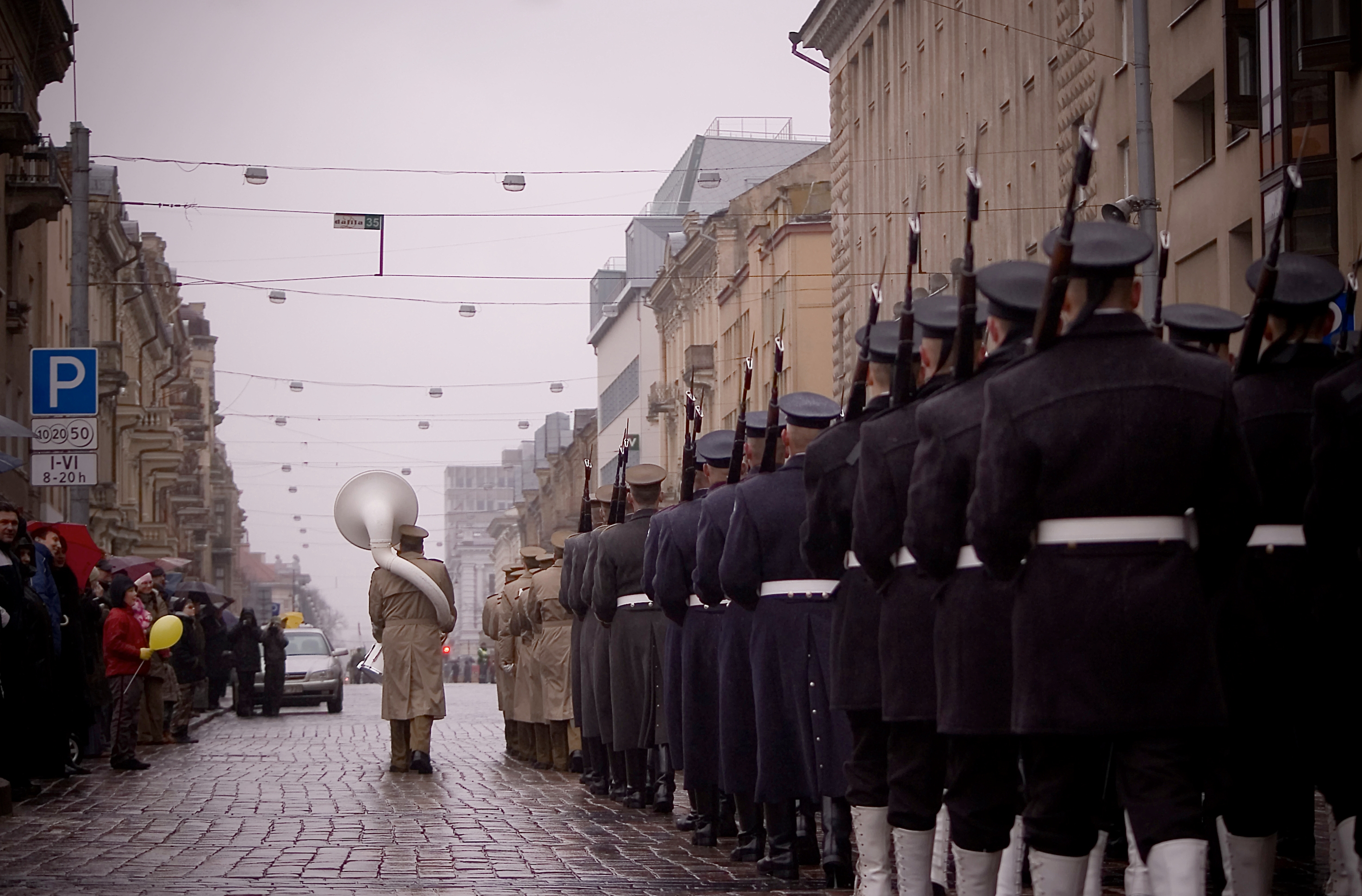
Troops of the company during a parade in Vilnius.

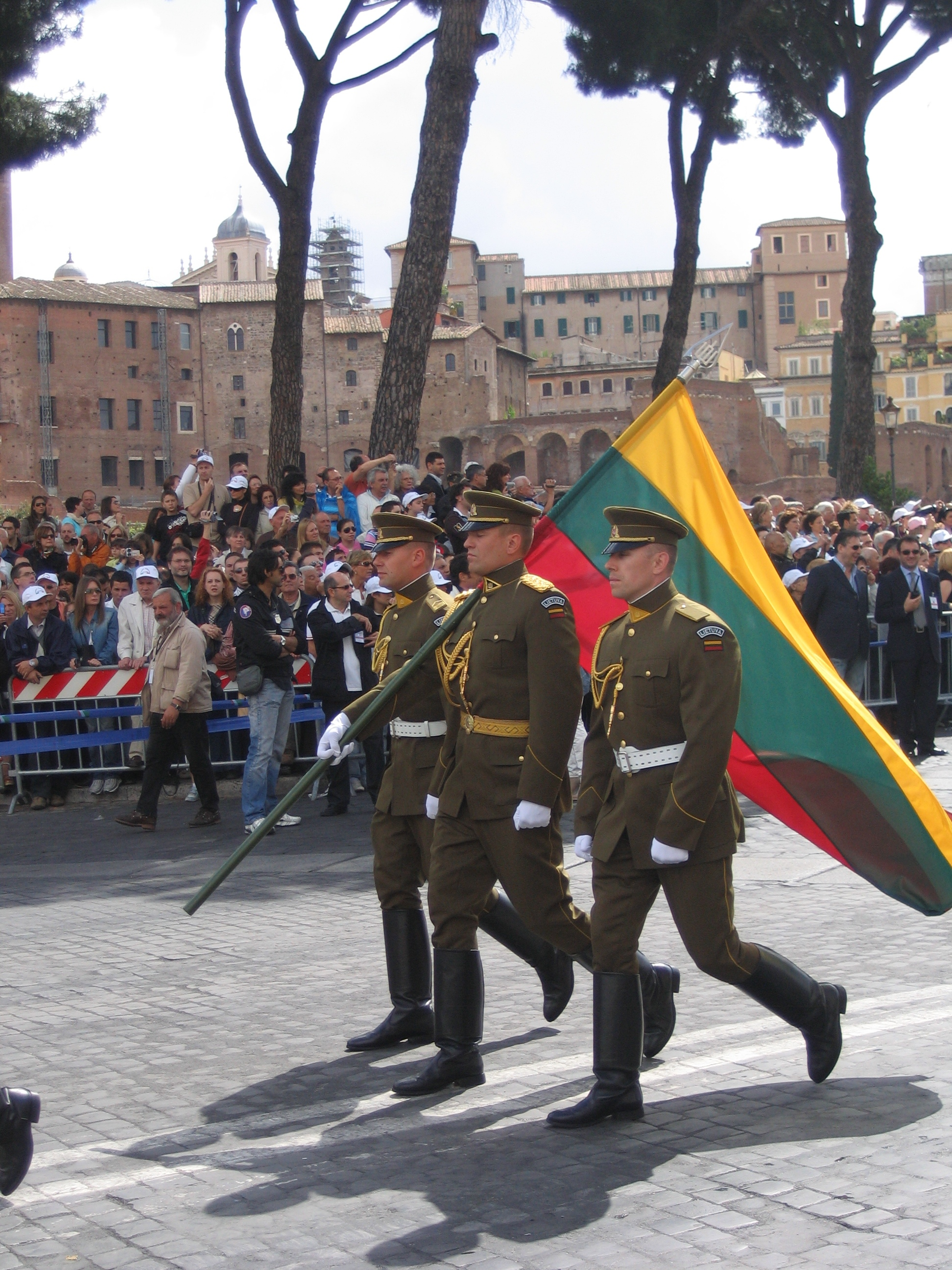
The color guard of the regiment during a parade in Italy.

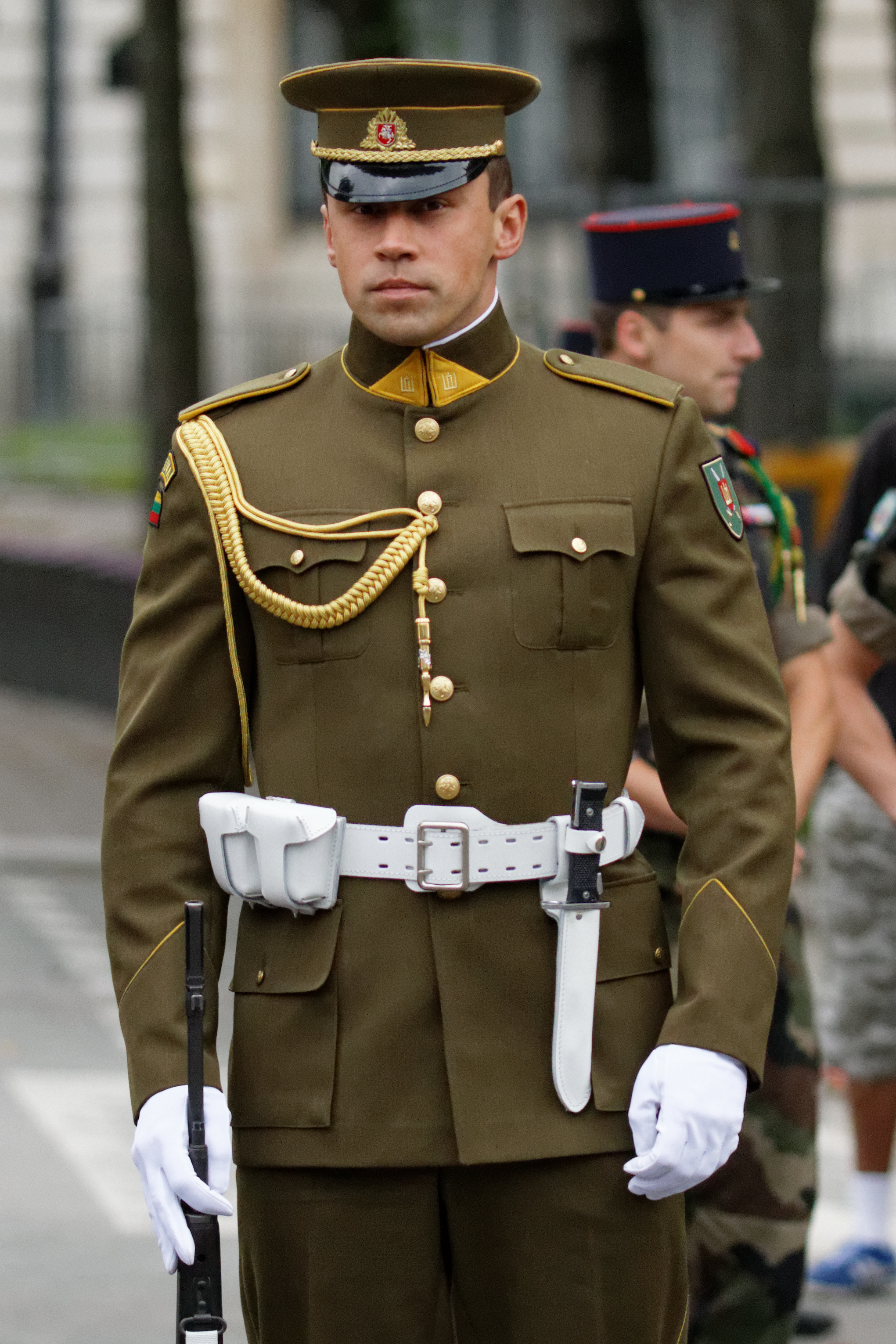

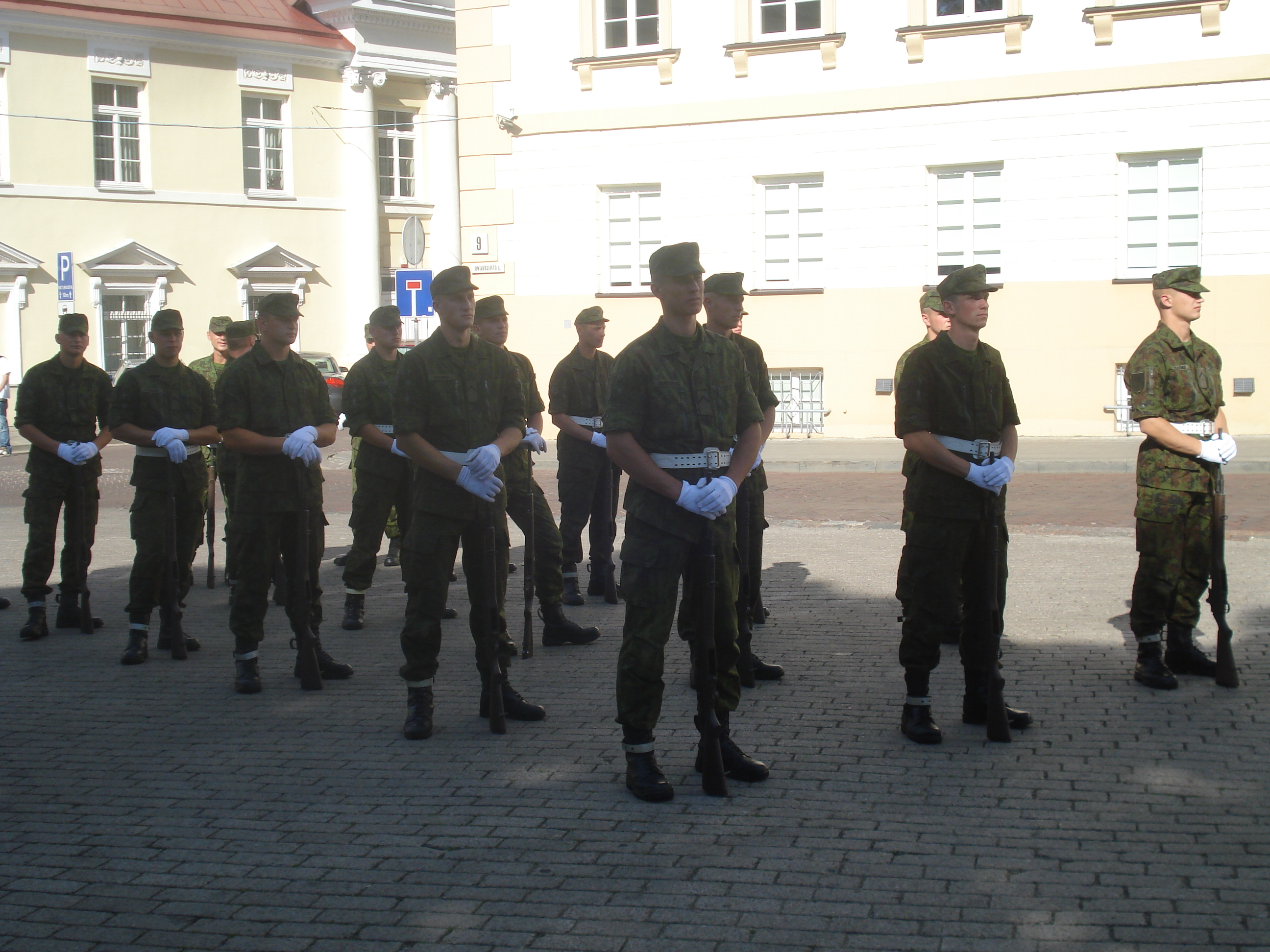
Members of the Honor Guard Company during their training.

== See also ==
- Guard Battalion (Estonia)
- Staff Battalion (Latvia)

== Sources ==
- kariuomene.lt (2021). "LDK Gedimino Štabo Bataliono istorija". Lietuvos kariuomenė (in Lithuanian). Archived from the original on 20 October 2021.
