= Benjamin Nelson =

American sociologist

Benjamin Nelson (1911 – September 17, 1977) was a sociologist who explored the historical development and nature of civilizations. He held positions at University of Chicago, University of Minnesota, Stony Brook University and after 1966, New School for Social Research.

Nelson was a Guggenheim Fellow for the academic year 1945–1946. He was a founder member and vice president (1976–1977) of the Society for the Scientific Study of Religion and the first America President (1971–1977) of the International Society for the Comparative Study of Civilizations.

== Major publications ==
- B. Nelson, The Idea of Usury: From Tribal Brotherhood to Universal Otherhood (Princeton University Press, 1949; 2nd ed., University of Chicago Press, 1969)
- B. Nelson, "The Future of Illusions," Psychoanalysis 2, 4(1954):16-37
- B. Nelson Preface to The Point Of View For My Work As An Author by Soren Kierkegaard 1962
- B. Nelson, "Scholastic Rationales of 'Conscience', Early Modern Crises of Credibility, and the Scientific-Technocultural Revolutions of the 17th and 20th Centuries," Journal for the Scientific Study of Religion 7(1968):157-177 doi:10.2307/1384625
- B. Nelson, "Max Weber's 'Author's Introduction' (1920)," Sociological Inquiry 44(1974):269-278 doi:10.1111/j.1475-682X.1974.tb01160.x
- B. Nelson, "Max Weber, Ernst Troeltsch, and Georg Jellinek as Comparative Historical Sociologists," Sociological Analysis 36(1975):229-240 doi:10.2307/3710369
- B. Nelson, "On Orient and Occident in Max Weber," Social Research 43(1976):114-129 JSTOR 40970216
- B. Nelson, On the Roads to Modernity, Conscience, Science and Civilizations (Totowa, N.J.: Rowman & Little-field, 1981).

== Books on Benjamin Nelson ==
- Vytautas Kavolis, E.V. Walter, E. Leites, M.C. Nelson. Civilizations East and West: A Memorial Volume for Benjamin Nelson. Atlantic Highlands, NJ: Humanities Press 1985.
