= Battle of Nowo Schwerschen =

1812 battle during Napoleon's invasion of Russia

- Part of the French invasion of Russia
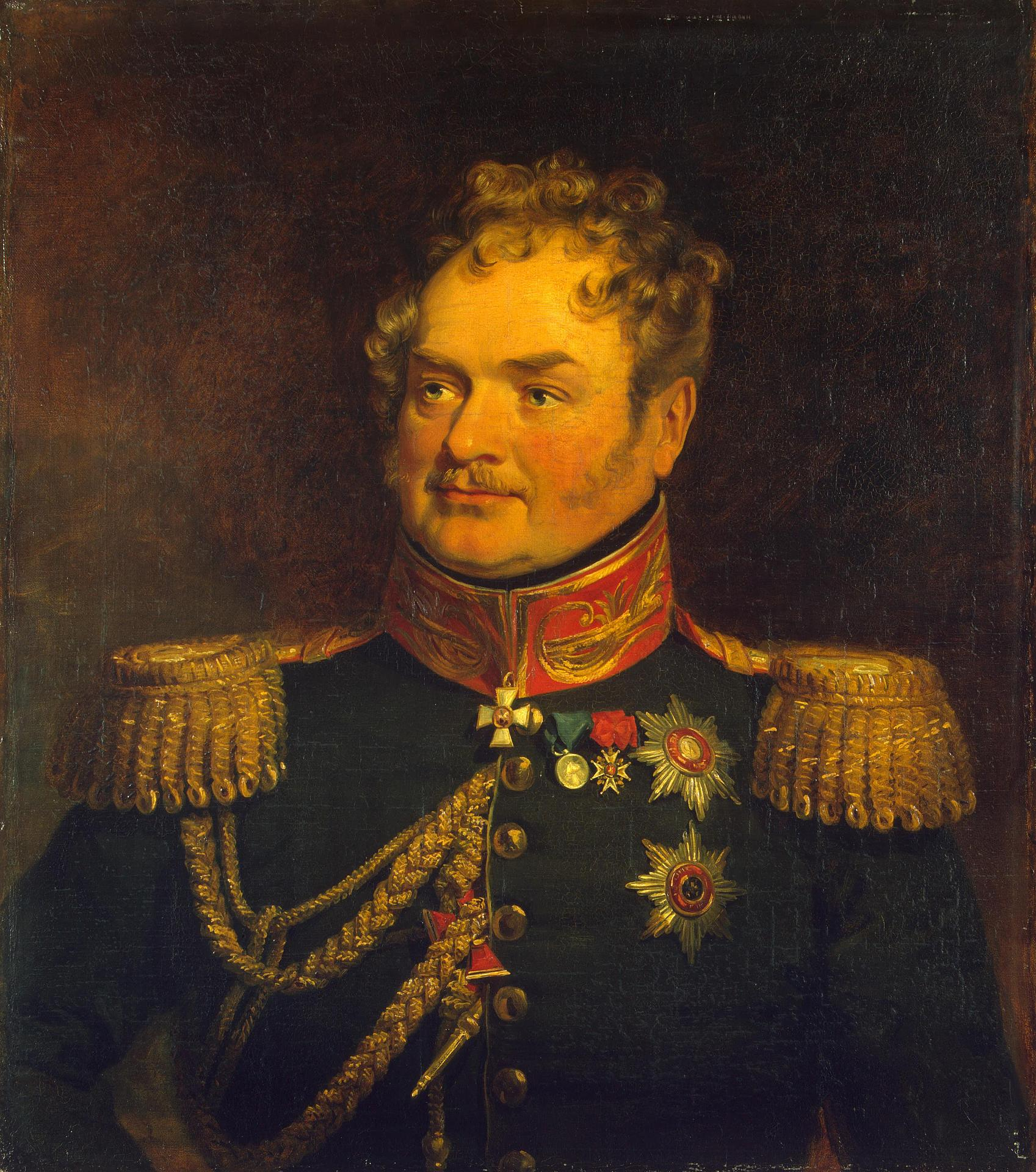
- Count Charles-Marie de Lambert
Date	13 November 1812
Location	Novy Sverzhen, Russian Empire (now Novy Sverzhan, Belarus)
Result	Russian victory

Belligerents
Russian Empire	Duchy of Warsaw

Commanders and leaders
Karl Lambert	Franciszek Ksawery Kossecki

Strength
4,500	3,500

Casualties and losses
50	1,300

The Battle of Nowo Schwerschen (Novy Sverzhen) was fought on Friday, 13 November 1812, near Novy Sverzhen or Nowo Schwerschen, part of the Russian Empire at the time (now in Belarus). An unexperienced Polish force under General Franciszek Ksawery Kossecki was defeated by seasoned Russian forces led by Count Lambert from Admiral Chichagov's Army of the Danube.

Kossecki's forces were given the task of protecting Minsk from a southeast attack and ensure a path of retreat for Napoleon's Grande Armée.

== Background ==
Maret sent General Kossecki with about 3,000 infantry and 500 cavalry men to Nowo Schwerschen where they were to protect the crossing of the Niemen.

According to Smith, Kossecki's division was composed of:

- 18th Lithuanian Infantry Regiment (one bn.)
- 19th Lithuanian Infantry Regiment (one bn.)
- 20th Lithuanian Infantry Regiment (one bn.)
- 21st Lithuanian Infantry Regiment (one bn.)
- combined Cavalry regiment

Count Lambert's units included the 10th and 14th Jaegers.

== Battle ==
On November 13, Lambert arrived at Nowo Schwerschen with the Third Western Army's vanguard. Kossecki's raw Polish recruits were driven off with heavy losses by the cavalry.

== Aftermath ==
The defeated detachment was once more attacked in the battle of Kaidanowo.

== See also ==
- List of battles of the French invasion of Russia

== Sources ==
- Bodart, Gaston (1908). Militär-historisches Kriegs-Lexikon (1618-1905) (in German).
- Glemža, Liudas (2003). "Lietuviški Daliniai Prancūzijos Kariuomenėje 1812-1814 m.". Karo Archyvas (in Lithuanian). 18. Vilnius: General Jonas Žemaitis Military Academy of Lithuania. doi:10.47459/ka.2003.18.4. S2CID 240261124.
- Riehn, Richard K. (1990). 1812 : Napoleon's Russian campaign. McGraw-Hill. ISBN 9780070527317.
- Smith, Digby (2004). Napoleon against Russia: a concise history of 1812. Great Britain: Pen and Sword Military. ISBN 9781783409587.
