= Communications and Information Systems Battalion (Lithuania) =

Grand Lithuanian Hetman Kristupas Radvila Perkūnas CIS Battalion
- LDE Kristupo Radvilos Perkūno RIS batalionas
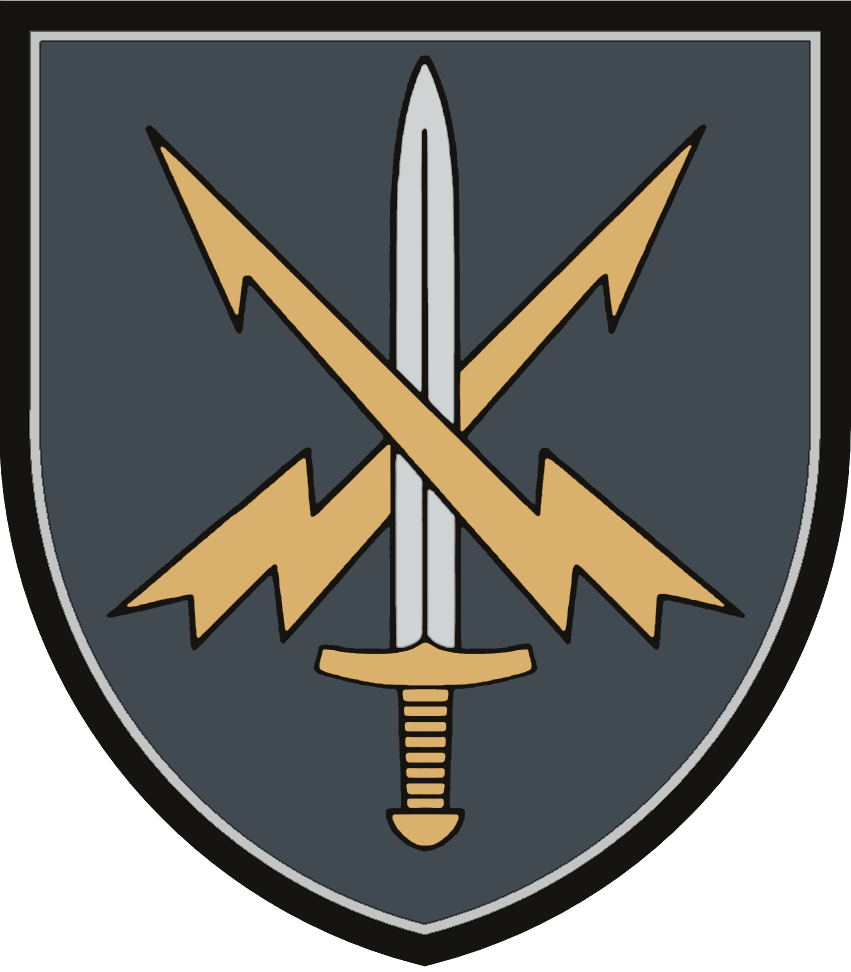
- Active: 1 January 2019 – present (7 years, 10 months)
- Country: Lithuania
- Branch: Joint (Lithuanian Armed Forces)
- Type: Classified
- Role: Communications security
- Part of: Cyber Defence Command
- Garrison/HQ: Vilnius
- Patron: Grand Lithuanian Hetman Kristupas Radvila Perkūnas
- Mottos: Mūsų siekiai - greitis ir tikslumas! (Translation: "'Our aspirations - speed and accuracy!'")
- Website: Official website

Commanders
- Current commander: Lt. Col. Aidas Kučinskas

Insignia
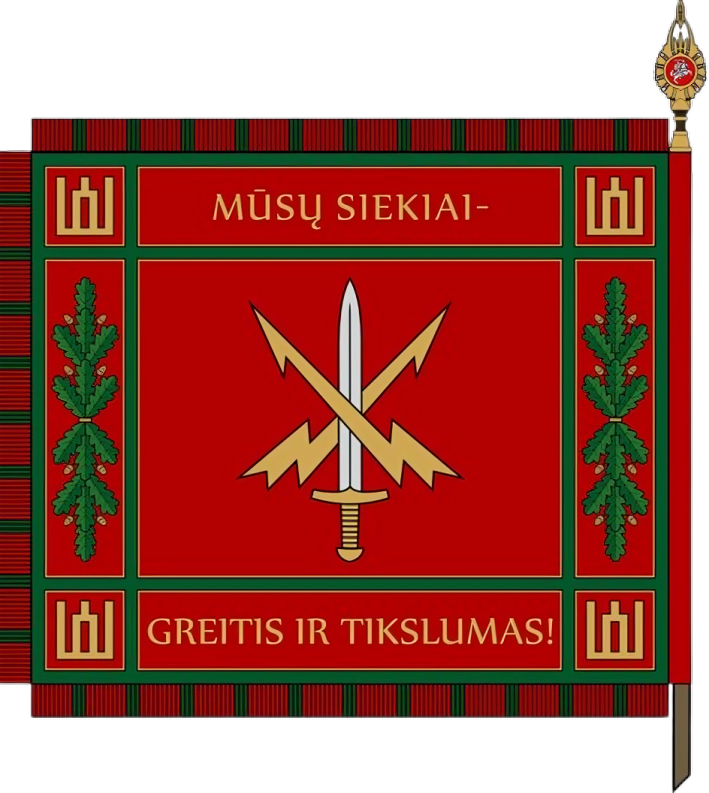
- Flag

The Grand Lithuanian Hetman Kristupas Radvila Perkūnas Communications and Information Systems Battalion (Lithuanian: Lietuvos didžiojo etmono Kristupo Radvilos Perkūno ryšių ir informacinių sistemų batalionas) is a Lithuanian military unit established on 8 January 2019.

== History ==
The Battalion was formed in January 2019, on the basis of the two Communications and Information Systems Companies and the PRISM module of the Grand Duke Gediminas Staff Battalion. According to Vice Minister of National Defence Edvinas Kerza, the establishment of the Communications and Information Systems Battalion was decided due to the need to provide protection from new IT threats.

In January 2025, Battalion was subordinated to the newly formed Lithuanian Armed Forces Cyber Defense Command.

== Mission ==
The main task of the Perkūnas CIS battalion is to ensure, upon receipt of an order, the support and provision of the communications and information systems of the State Defence Strategic Command (State Defence Council) and the Armed Forces Command (Defence Staff) in the designated area of operations, as well as the reliable functioning of redeployable communications and information systems, in order to create favorable conditions for the command and control of the State Defence.

== Structure ==
The Battalion structure consists of:

- Wireless Telecommunications Company (BTK);
- Wired Telecommunications Company (LTK);
- Network Management and Cyber Defense Company (TVKGK);
- Headquarters Supply Platoon (ŠAK);
- Redeployable Communications and Information Systems Module (PRISM), assigned to the 3rd Communications Battalion of NATO forces.
- Сommand Group and Headquarters;
