= Hamina Tattoo =

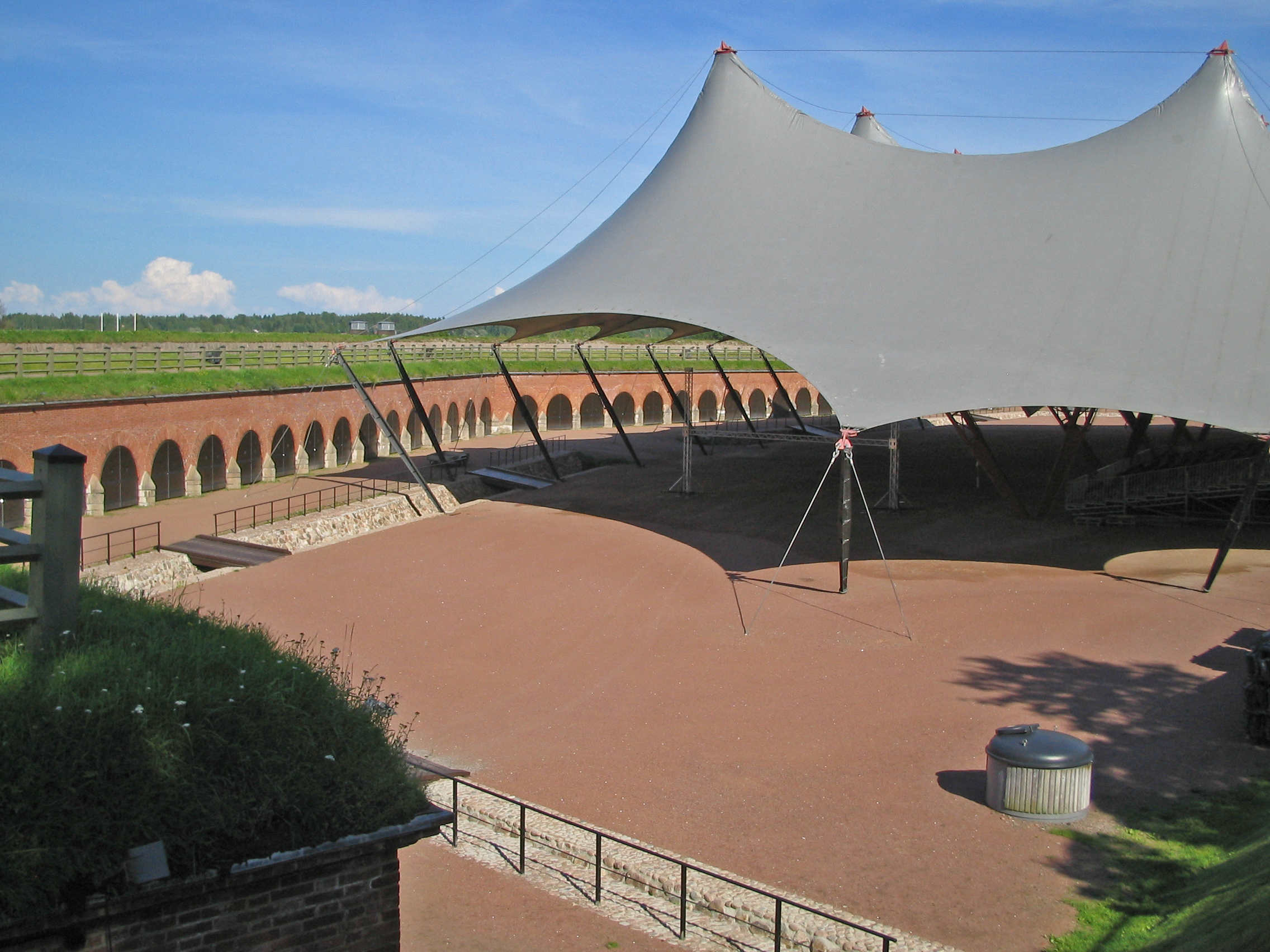
Hamina Fortress

The Hamina Tattoo is a biannual military event in Hamina, Finland. It is the official military tattoo of the Finnish Defense Forces. It was established in 1990. The event has usually taken place in July or August. It was established as a result of an idea proposed in the early 1980s. The main venue of the tattoo has been Hamina Fortress since 1998.

== Notable participants ==
External videos
- The Hungarian Defence Forces Central Band at the tattoo in 2008

- Kaartin Soittokunta
- Conscript Band of the Finnish Defence Forces
- Hungarian Defense Forces Central Military Band
- Iron Wolf Military Band
- Central Military Band of the Ministry of Defense of Russia
