= Konstanty Tyzenhauz =

Polish–Lithuanian nobleman (1786–1853)

Count Konstanty Tyzenhauz
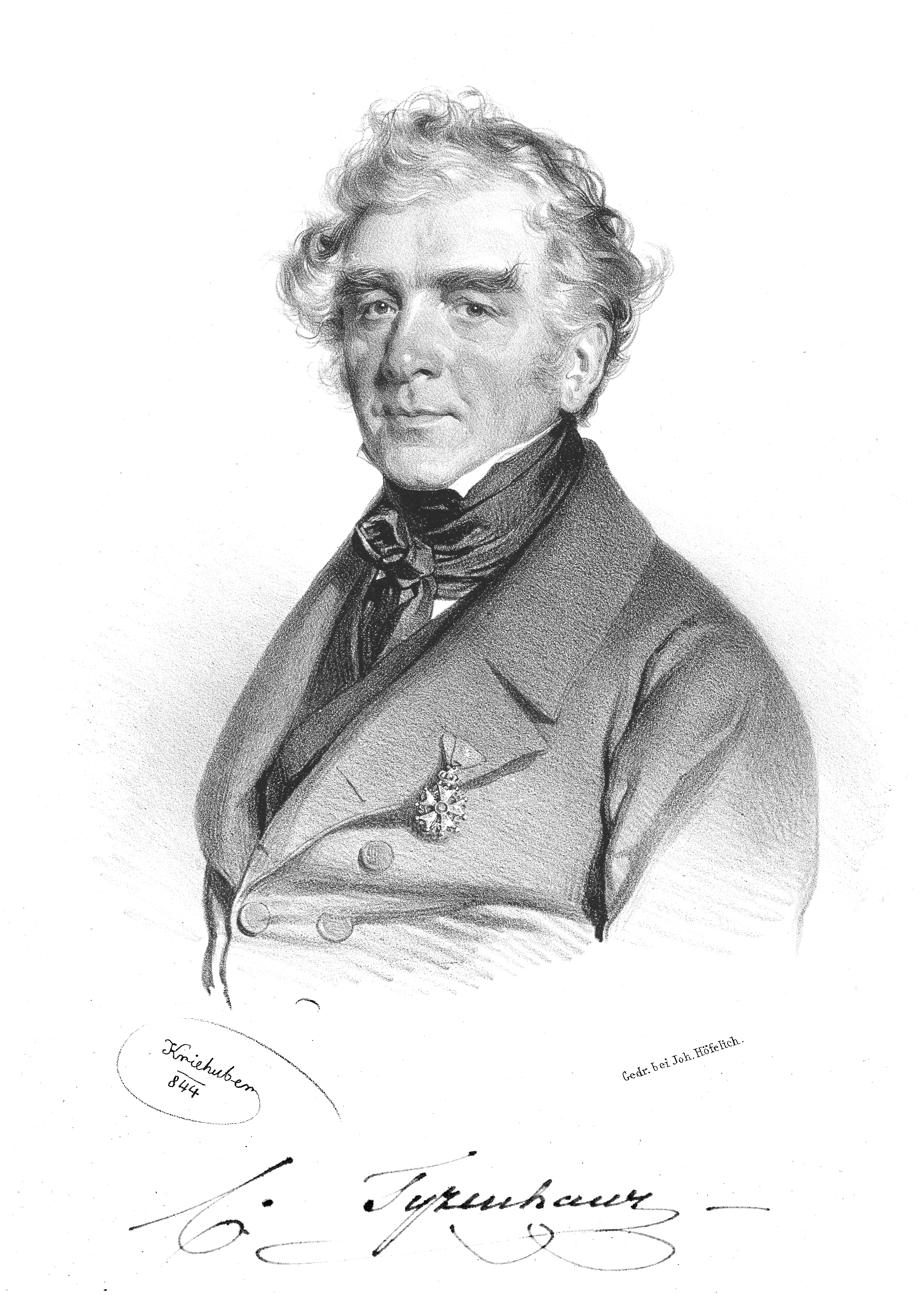
- Lithograph c.1844
- Born: Count Konstanty Tyzenhauz; 3 June 1786; Żołudek, Polish–Lithuanian Commonwealth
- Died: 16 March 1853 (aged 66); Pastavy, Russian Empire
- Education: University of Vilnius
- Known for: Large zoological collection (with 1093 skins and 563 eggs)
- Parents: Count Ignacy Tyzenhauz (father); Maria Przezdziecka (mother)
- Family: Tyzenhauz family
- Awards: Officer's Cross of the Legion of Honor (1813)
- Scientific career
- Fields: Naturalism, artist, patron of ornithology
- Workplaces: Museum of Natural History, France

Count Konstanty Tyzenhauz (Lithuanian: Konstantinas Tyzenhauzas; 3 June 1786 – 16 March 1853) was a Polish–Lithuanian nobleman, naturalist, artist, and founder of ornithology in Poland and Lithuania. He made a large collection of eggs and bird skins at his estate in Pastavy (now in Belarus).

== Biography ==
Tyzenhaus was born in Żołudek near Grodno to Count Ignacy Tyzenhauz and Maria née Przezdziecka. After education at the University of Vilnius, he took part in the Napoleonic Wars (1812–14), specifically the French invasion of Russia and the War of the Sixth Coalition. At the time, he was the commander of the 19th Lithuanian Infantry Regiment. It was shortly after the war that he became familiar with taxidermic techniques at the Paris Museum of Natural History. French was a second language in the Polish–Lithuanian aristocracy and his correspondents included Félix Édouard Guérin-Méneville (1799–1874). He was made the Officer of the Legion of Honour on August 10, 1813, and he continued to live in Clermont-Ferrand, not returning to Lithuania until the Tsar declared an amnesty for the former soldiers of the Grande Armée.

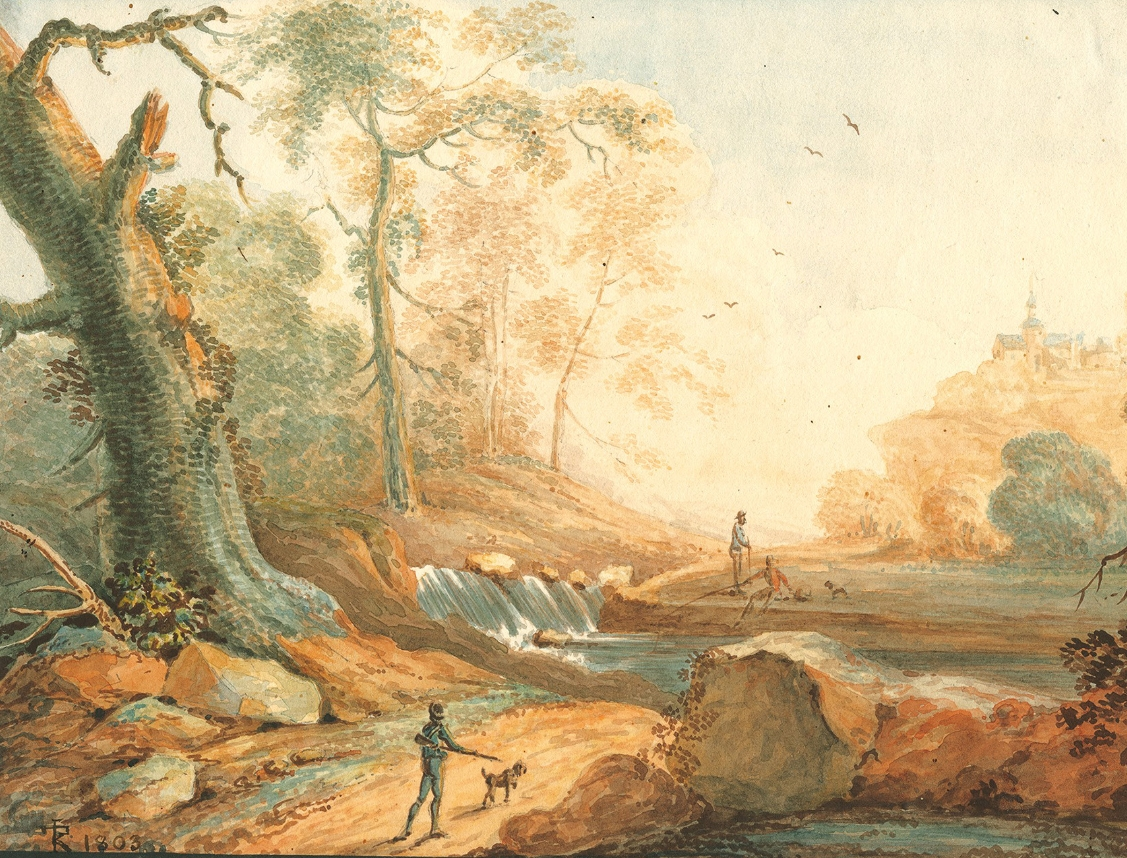
A landscape painting by Tyzenhauz, 1803

He then took a keen interest in the birds of the Vilnius region and made collections of eggs and skins. He made innovations on mounting birds that he also shared with Ludwik Bojanus who was setting up a museum at the University of Vilnius. He also wrote some books on ornithology and maintained a correspondence with many European ornithologists. His knowledge of French, German, Italian and Latin allowed him to communicate with Verreaux, Lichtenstein, Reichenbach, Grube, Eichwald and Heckel. He collected ornithology books and portraits of ornithologists. He owned a copy of Audubon's birds. He trained in art under Jean-Pierre Norblin de La Gourdaine, Aleksander Orłowski (1777–1832) and Jan Rustem (1762–1835) in Vilnius. He made portraits, landscape and also illustrated plates for books by Władysław Taczanowski. He also collected paintings and had a gallery in his manor in Pastavy. He also sang and played the cello. After his death, the zoological collections (with 1093 skins and 563 eggs) were donated by his son Rajnold Tyzenhauz (1830-1880) to the Archaeological Commission of Vilnius and became part of the Museum of Antiquities.

In c. 1820, he married Waleria Wańkowicz, daughter of Antoni Wańkowicz and Anna née Sołtan. They had 5 children: Zbigniew, Helena, Maria Anna Waleria, Władysław and Rajnold.

A species of hoverfly Sphecomyia vespiformis was described in 1852 in a genus named in honour of Tyzenhauz as Tyzenhauzia. The plants Chara tyzenhauzii and Potamogeton tyzenhauzii were also named after him.

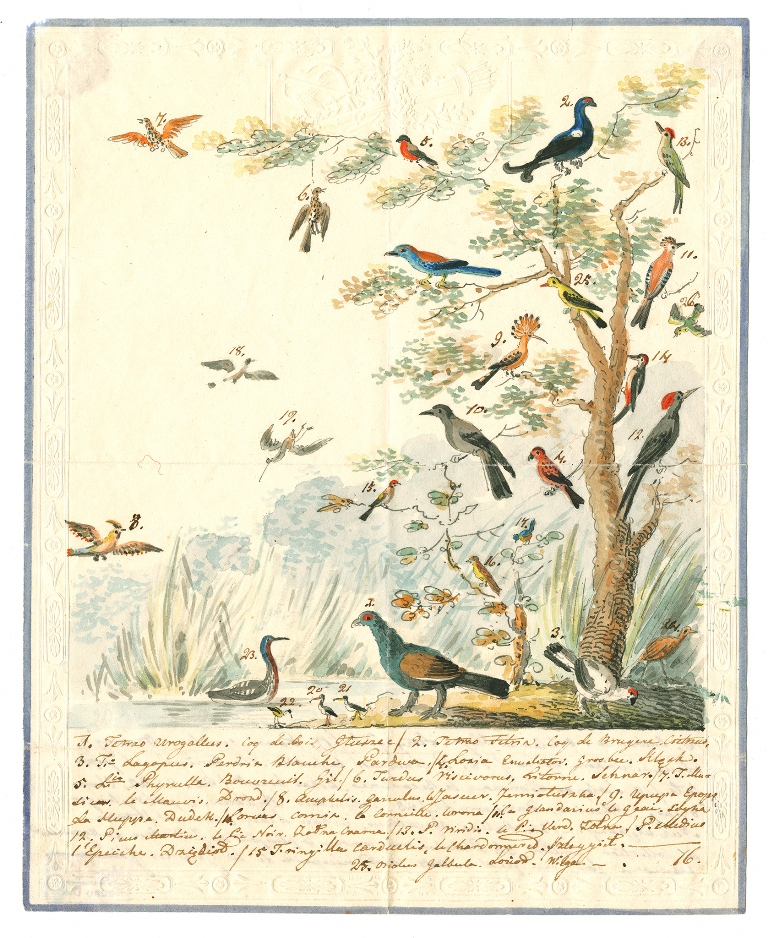
Bird illustration by Tyzenhauz
