= Vytautas Kavolis =

Lithuanian sociologist, literary critic, and culture historian (1930–1996)

Vytautas Kavolis (September 8, 1930 in Kaunas – June 25, 1996 in Vilnius) was a Lithuanian sociologist, literary critic, and culture historian. He was the department head and Professor of Comparative Civilizations and Professor of Sociology at Dickinson College Kavolis authored more than a dozen books and numerous scholarly articles published in the US and Lithuania. Most of his work was published in English. Kavolis' literary criticism embraced, and contributed to, postmodern and postcolonial perspectives.

== Early life and education ==
Kavolis was born in Kaunas. With his parents, Kavolis left Lithuania in the wake of the Soviet occupation in 1944, living first in West Germany and then in the United States. He attended the University of Wisconsin–Madison and the University of Chicago, receiving his master's degree and doctorate from Harvard University.

== Career ==
Kavolis taught at Tufts University and Dickinson College, where he was the head of the sociology department. He was Charles A. Dana Professor of Comparative Civilizations and Professor of Sociology at Dickinson from 1964 until his sudden death in 1996. During this time he also served as a visiting professor at The New School in New York City and at Vytautas Magnus University in Kaunas. He founded and edited the Lithuanian-American journal Metmenys, was a board member of several Lithuanian-American organizations, and the main ideologist of Santara-Šviesa.

Kavolis was a member of the International Society for the Comparative Study of Civilizations, serving on its executive board from 1974 to 1977 and as its president from 1977 to 1983. He was the recipient of Lithuania's 1993 National Prize for Culture and Art. Professor Kavolis was awarded a doctorate honoris causa by Klaipėda University in 1995.

=== Research ===
Kavolis was especially interested in the conflicts between nationalism and liberalism, drawing upon his experience as a member of two cultures. His work often used the resurgence of Lithuanian nationalism in the early 20th century and its re-appearance after Lithuanian independence in 1990 as a case study. Kavolis expressed a guarded optimism that modernization and globalization could co-exist with nationalism, including the nations of Islam. His concept of "the polylogue of civilisations" was cited by Lithuanian President Valdas Adamkus at a 2001 UNESCO conference in Vilnius as guidance for Lithuania's future:

As my old friend, professor Vytautas Kavolis, former President of the International Society for the Comparative Study of Civilisations, said, every civilisation has its own denominator of cultural liberalism, which enables different societies to understand each other. He was convinced that this denominator of liberalism along with mutual understanding between civilisations should nowadays be promoted by a modern educational system. Professor Kavolis maintained that sooner or later comparative studies of civilizations will become an important part of modem education.

== Personal life and death ==
He died 1996 in Vilnius. Leonidas Donskis considered him his mentor in the US.

== Selected bibliography ==
=== Books ===
- Artistic Expression—A Sociological Analysis. Ithaca, NY: Cornell University Press 1968, was translated into Swedish and Spanish in 1970. Chapter 5 was translated into German in 1979 and Chapter 9 was translated into Lithuanian as "Meno stilius, kaip religijos ypatybiu projekcija," Kulturos Barai, 1993, No 2-3.
- History on Art's Side: Social Dynamics in Artistic Efflorescences. Ithaca, NY: Cornell University Press 1972.
- Editor, Designs of Selfhood, Rutherford, NJ: Farleigh Dickinson University Press, 1984.
- Co-editor, with E.V. Walter, E. Leites, M.C. Nelson, of Civilizations East and West: A Memorial Volume for Benjamin Nelson. Atlantic Highlands, NJ: Humanities Press 1985.
- Epochų Signatūros (Epochal Signatures). Chicago: Algimanto Mackaus knygu leidimo fondas, 1991.
- The Trajectories of Consciousness: Modernization Aspects of Lithuanian Culture. Chicago: Algimanto Mackaus knygų leidimo fondas, 1986.
- Kultūros dirbtuvė (Culture Workshop). Vilnius: Baltos Lankos 1996.
- Kultūrinė psichologija (Cultural Psychology). Vilnius: Baltos Lankos 1995.
- Nepriklausomųjų kelias (The Road to Independence). Vilnius: Versus Aureus, 2006.

=== Articles ===
- "Artistic Expression: A Sociological Analysis." American Sociological Review, Vol. 35, No. 3 (June 1970)
- "Social Conditions of Artistic Creativity: An Analytical Schema." The Western Canadian Journal of Anthropology 2(3): 90–102
- "History on Art's Side: Social Dynamics in Artistic Efflorescences." Contemporary Sociology, Vol. 2, No. 6 (November 1973)
- "Social and Economic Aspects of the Arts." Encyclopaedia Britannica (1975)
- "Models of Rebellion: An Essay in Civilization Analysis." Comparative Civilizations Review, No. 3 (Fall 1979)
- "Toward A History Of Bodily Discipline." Lituanus, January 1997
- "Civilization Theory and Collective Identity in the Postmodern-Globalized Era." Kulturos barai, July 2006. Online version at
