= Siege of Modlin (1813) =

- Part of War of the Sixth Coalition
Date	February 23, 1813 – December 25, 1813
Location	Modlin Fortress, Duchy of Warsaw (now Poland)
Result	Russian victory

Belligerents
France: Lithuania (1812); Duchy of Warsaw; Saxony; Grand Duchy of Würzburg	Russia

Commanders and leaders
Herman Willem Daendels	Ivan Paskevich; Andrey Kleinmichel

Strength
February: 5,200–6,500; December: 2,000–3,000	February: 7,000; April–May: 28,000; December: 9,000–10,000

The siege of Modlin was a ten-month-long siege during the War of the Sixth Coalition in 1813, in which Russian forces besieged Modlin Fortress in the Duchy of Warsaw. The garrison, commanded by the Dutch general Herman Willem Daendels, consisted of Lithuanian, French, German and Polish troops. The Russian forces were initially commanded by Ivan Paskevich, who was later replaced by Andrey Kleinmichel.

The siege began in February 1813. Although the Russian forces initially maintained a blockade rather than attempting to storm the fortress, the garrison suffered heavy losses, particularly from disease and deteriorating living conditions. Following Napoleon's defeat at the Battle of Leipzig and the withdrawal of his forces towards France, the defenders capitulated in December 1813.

== Background ==
The failed French invasion of Russia in 1812 ended with a severely weakened Grande Armée and shifted the strategic initiative to the Imperial Russian Army. The war spilt over from the territories then belonging to the Russian Empire to the neighbouring states of the Kingdom of Prussia and the Duchy of Warsaw. Thus, at the turn of 1812 and 1813, began the War of the Sixth Coalition.

The Russian military ended the Lithuanian Provisional Governing Commission's attempts in the latter half of 1812 to establish a new state and raise military units. However, much of the Lithuanian infantry raised in 1812 retreated together with Napoleon's troops. After some back-and-forth in letters with Prince Józef Poniatowski, Napoleon finally assigned the Lithuanian infantry regiments, freshly created in 1812 and untrained and inexperienced, to garrison the Modlin fortress.

The Saxon forces defending the fortress were the II/Prinz Friedrich Infantry Regiment and the Niesemeuschel Battalion. The latter battalion consisted of the survivors of the Battle of Kobrin, where an entire Saxon brigade was encircled.

== Siege ==
In January 1813, Herman Willem Daendels was assigned to command the Modlin Fortress, which had been designated as a supply depot. The defence force consisted of 5,200–6,500 men, mainly newly brought Lithuanian troops, who were recruited in 1812. The fortifications were in very insufficient condition. When the French armies had been pushed over to the western side of the Vistula, the fortress was initially surrounded by a weak force under the General Ivan Paskevich. Later, about 9,000–10,000 men, militia under the Russian General Andrey Kleinmichel were assigned for this purpose. The Russians did not launch large attacks on the fortress and decided to surround and starve the place.

Due to illness and desertion, the garrison was reduced to 2,000–3,000 men. When the supply was almost exhausted and the French armies had been pushed back within France's borders, Daendels surrendered the fortress to the Russians in December 1813. The precise date of the surrender differs among the sources, with some naming the date as December 1, while others name December 25. Some German sources claim that the surrender gave the Russians 120 cannons, around 4,900 muskets, and, allegedly after ten months of siege, "a large quantity of food". All the survivors of the garrison were taken as prisoners of war.

There was a rumor circulating in the Russian-occupied Duchy of Warsaw throughout 1813 that while the fortresses of Modlin and Zamość held out, the revolutionary spirit in Poland would continue, and once Napoleon won in Germany (which ultimately did not happen due to his defeat at the Battle of Leipzig in late October 1813), there would be a mass uprising and Modlin would be the centre.

On February 28, 1813, the fortress was blockaded by Major General Ivan Paskevich's 7,000-strong corps with 48 guns. After Thorn capitulated in April, its siege artillery was transferred to Modlin, but due to a lack of manpower, the operation was limited to a blockade of the fortress. When Paskevich's troop strength increased to 28,000, the Russians began a proper siege, including engineering work and bombardment of the fortress. The assault was interrupted by the June Truce of Pläswitz with Napoleon. Paskevich's corps joined Bennigsen's army, which was heading to join the Main Army in Saxony. Lieutenant General Kleinmichel then led the siege, whose forces included 10,000 militia.

Once Napoleon had suffered a major defeat at the Battle of Leipzig and then having been driven behind the Rhine, before the start of the Campaign in north-east France in 1814, the commander Daendels surrendered, no longer seeing any purpose in the continued resistance of the fortress.

== Order of Battle ==
=== Defenders (strength as of March 1813) ===
- 18th Lithuanian Infantry Regiment (54 officers/824 men)
- 19th Lithuanian Infantry Regiment (22/22)
- 20th Lithuanian Infantry Regiment (39/891)
- 21st Lithuanian Infantry Regiment (23/575)
- 22nd Lithuanian Infantry Regiment (12/53)
- 3rd Polish Infantry Regiment (unknown – in mid-February, the unit had 37/600)
- 17th Polish Infantry Regiment (unknown – in mid-February, the unit had 34/419, 30/462 by March 25)
- Saxon I/Niesemeuschel Infantry Regiment (12/414)
- IV/Würzburg Infantry Regiment (17/361)
- I/133rd Line Infantry Regiment (17/402)
- 18/7th Foot Artillery (3/103) (another source claims it was actually the 12th Company)
- 2/5th Foot Artillery (1/23)
- 8/9th Foot Artillery (0/7) (another source claims it was actually the 4th Company)

	Infantry		Artillery		
Nationality	Officers	Infantry	Officers	Men	Guns
Lithuanians	150	2,365	/		
Polish	61	1,019	/		
Germans	29	775	/		
French	17	402	4	133	120
Total:	267	4,561	4	133	120

=== Russian ===
Initial Siege Force at Modlin, according to Nafziger

- Velikiye Luki Infantry Regiment
- Galits Infantry Regiment
- Saratov Infantry Regiment

== Bibliography ==
- Blok, Petrus Johannes; Molhuysen, Philipp Christiaan (1911). "Daendels, Herman Willem". Nieuw Nederlandsch Biografisch Woordenboek (in Dutch). Vol. 1. Leiden.
- Gill, John H. (2025). Broken Eagles: Napoleon's German Allies and the Campaigns of 1813. Vol. 1: Contingents of Saxony and Bavaria. Greenhill Books. ISBN 978-1-80500-173-7.
- Bodart, Gaston (1908). Militär-historisches Kriegs-Lexikon (1618–1905) [Military-Historical War Lexicon (1618–1905)] (in German).
- Förster, Friedrich Christoph (1889). Geschichte der Befreiungs-Kriege, 1813, 1814, 1815 (in German). Vol. 1.
- Förster, Friedrich Christoph (1890). Geschichte der Befreiungs-Kriege, 1813, 1814, 1815 (in German). Vol. 2.
- von Rau, Karl Ferdinand; von Cronenthal, Emil Heinrich Hänel (1826). Der Krieg der Verbündeten gegen Frankreich in den Jahren 1813, 1814 und 1815 (in German). Vol. 3. Berlin.

=== George Nafziger ===
- Nafziger, George (2010a). "French Garrisons in Germany and Poland – 1 March 1813".
- Nafziger, George (2010b). "French Artillery Units in Germany – 15 March 1813" (PDF).
- Nafziger, George (2010c). "Polish Forces – French V Corps – 25 March 1813" (PDF).
- Nafziger, George (2010d). "Army of the Grand Duchy of Warsaw – 17–18 February 1813" (PDF).
- Nafziger, George (2010e). "Russian Army – 1 January 1813" (PDF).
