= Karol Dominik Przeździecki =

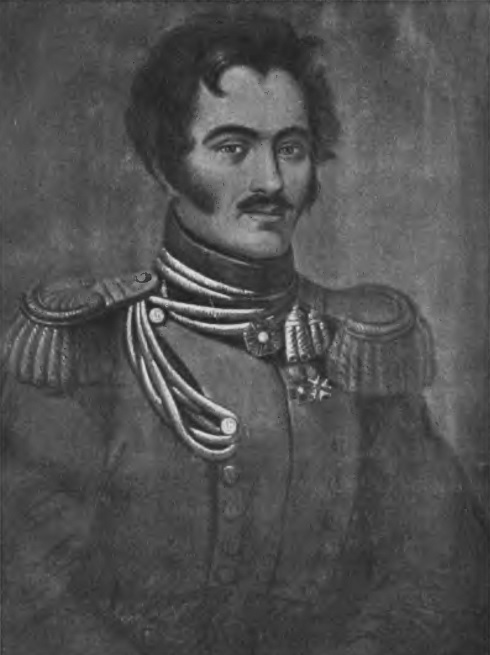
- Born: 1782; Chornyi Ostriv
- Died: 1832 (aged 51–52); Poznań or Königsberg
- Occupation: military officer
- Spouse(s): Anna Chrapowicka, Kornelia Gorska
- Parents: Michał Przeździecki; Maria Mostowska
- Family: Przeździecki family

Karol Dominik Przeździecki (1782–1832) was a Polish count, born in Chornyi Ostriv.

In 1806, he was the ruler of Smarhonʹ. During the French invasion of Russia in 1812, he first commanded the 21st Lithuanian Infantry Regiment until August, and then the 18th Lithuanian Lancer Regiment. In 1813, he was awarded the Legion of Honour.

In 1816, he retired and lived in Smarhon, occupying himself with local industry. One of his occupations was breeding horses. He participated in the 1830–1831 November Uprising. After its suppression he escaped to Poznań, where he died in 1832.
