= Lithuanian Air Force Band =

Musical unit in the Lithuanian Armed Forces

Lithuanian Air Force Orchestra
- Military band
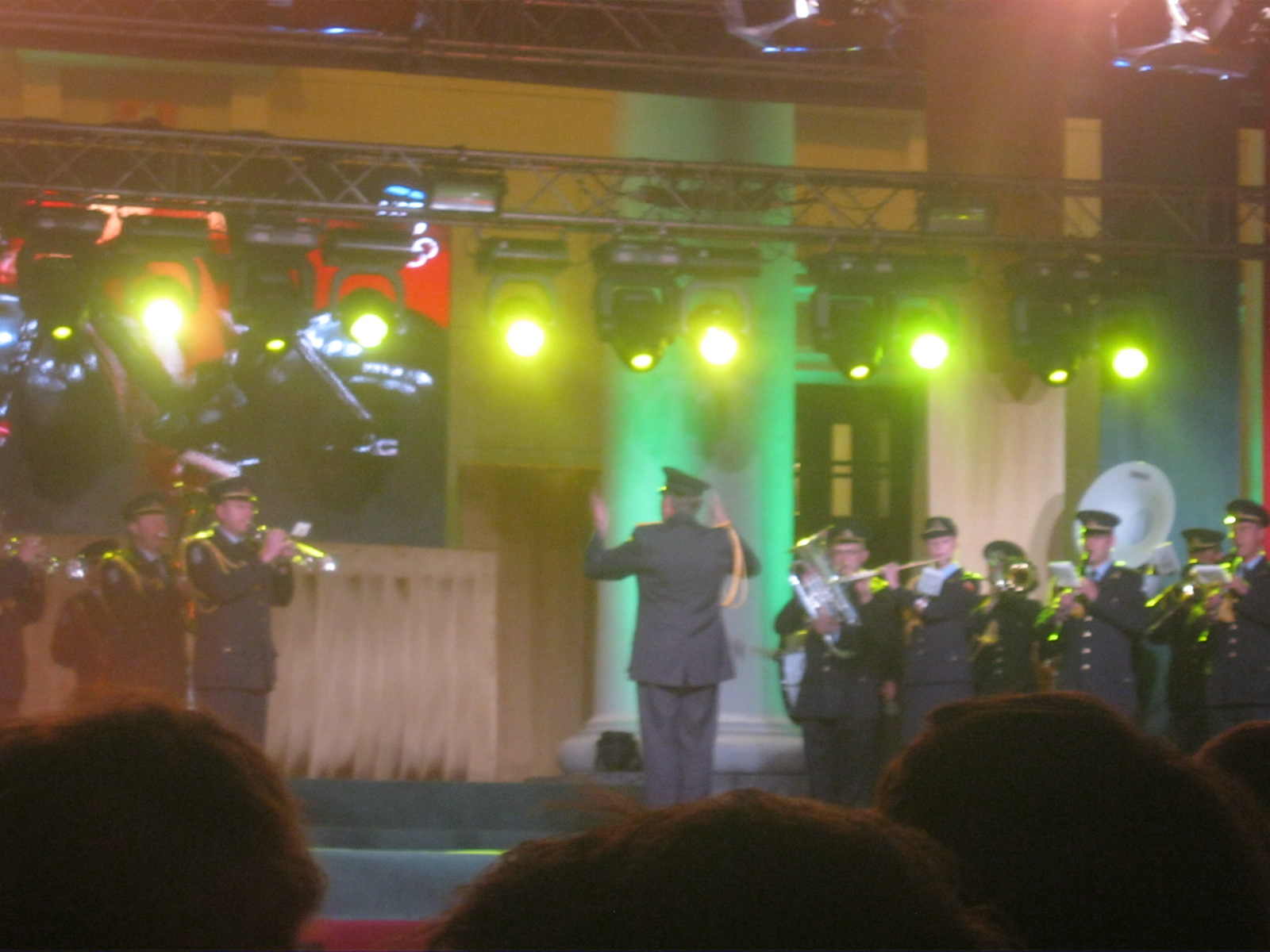
- Native name: Lietuvos Karinių oro pajėgų orkestras
- Short name: LAF Orchestra
- Founded: 12 May 1994; 30 years ago
- Location: Vilnius, Lithuania
- Principal conductor: Captain Ričardas Kukulskis; Captain Remigijus Terminas

The Lithuanian Air Force Band (Lithuanian: Lietuvos Karinių oro pajėgų orkestras) is a Lithuanian musical group representing the Lithuanian Air Force which participates in military parades, celebrations, funeral ceremonies, as well as concerts for the public. It was founded in Vilnius on 12 May 1994 as two separate orchestras (the central air force orchestra led by Colonel Č. Braziulis, and the Vytautas Magnus Battalion wind orchestra led by Colonel J. Veselkos). On 21 March 2001, the Commander of the Air Force and the Minister of National Defense ordered the merger of the two orchestras to become the representative air force orchestra. The orchestra has 29 musicians and is led by Captain Ričardas Kukulskis and Captain Remigijus Terminas.

== See also ==
- Lithuanian Armed Forces Orchestra
- Military Music Center of the Ukrainian Air Force
- Air Force Band Erfurt
