= Lithuanian Armed Forces Headquarters Band =

Musical unit in the Lithuanian Armed Forces

Lithuanian Armed Forces Headquarters Band Lietuvos kariuomenės orkestras
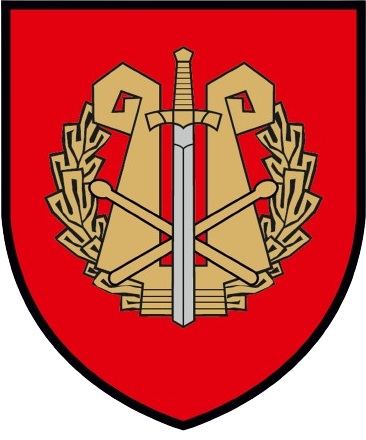
- Insignia of LAF Headquarters Band
- Active: 4 September 1991; 34 years ago
- Country: Lithuania
- Allegiance: Lithuania
- Branch: Lithuanian Armed Forces
- Type: Military Band
- Size: 60
- Part of: Grand Duke Gediminas Staff Battalion
- Garrison/HQ: Vilnius
- Nickname: LKO Orchestra
- Anniversaries: September 4

Commanders
- Senior Director of Music/Commander: Captain Egidijus Ališauskas
- Bandmaster: Lieutenant Dainius Pavilionis
- Notable commanders: Major-General Justinas Jonušas

The Lithuanian Armed Forces Headquarters Band (Lithuanian: Lietuvos kariuomenės orkestras), also known as the LKO HQ Band, is a Lithuanian musical unit stationed in Vilnius, being attached to the Grand Duke Gediminas Staff Battalion and one of 5 that are based in the country. It is the largest professional military band in Lithuania as well as in the military bands in the other Baltic States, being larger than the Kaitseväe Orkester and the Central Military Band of the Latvian National Armed Forces. The band is currently led by Egidijus Ališauskas, with assistance from the deputy commander, Lieutenant Dainius Pavilionis.

== History ==
On September 4, 1991, the Lithuanian Armed Forces Band was founded following the restoration of Lithuania's independence. The band was then managed by Major General Justinas Jonušas (1938–2013) and was made up of 57 civilian and military musicians, many with prior experience in military bands in the Soviet Union. It was formed in the basis of the HQ Band of the Vilnius Garrison under the Soviet Army, which served as the official military band of the city during Soviet times and was the Lithuanian SSR's principal band for state celebrations.

The main purpose of the band is to participate in the official meetings of high ranking foreign guests and in ceremonial events of the Lithuanian Armed Forces. In addition, the band also conducts regular concerts on public holidays, and competes in musical festivals. As of date, the band has released seven CDs. The band also prepares parades performed during various holidays.

== Performances and collaborations ==
Since its creation, the band has worked with the military bands of many other countries that are members of the European Union and NATO. The band has successfully participated in military music festivals and has performed in Germany, Belgium, Poland, the Netherlands, Denmark, France, Estonia, Sweden, Guinea, and the Czech Republic. In 1996, it won 1st place in the Grand Prix at the International bands in Poland, and in 1999, participated in the NATO Military band Festival in Kaiserslautern Germany. On special occasions, the band wears historical 18th century uniforms of the Infantry Regiment of the Grand Duchy of Lithuania.

=== 2006 LSDP performance controversy ===
At the end of June 2004, a public event was held in Vilnius to commemorate the 110th anniversary of the Lithuanian Social Democratic Party, to which, at the request of one of the leaders of the LSDP, defence minister Gediminas Kirkilas sent the armed forces band. Opposition parties were outraged by the participation of Lithuanian military musicians in the event, with members of the Liberal Movement of the Seimas demanding an explanation from Kirkilas. Kirkilas justified his decision, explaining that the anniversary of the LSDP was "a significant cultural event related to the statehood of Lithuania and a part of the country's cultural heritage." In October of that year, the Central Commission for Official Ethics (COEC) ruled that then Minister of National Defense Kirkilas had not committed an offense by asking the President to send the band to the LSDP event. Commenting on the COEC decision, Chief of Defence Valdas Tutkus said that the event was not a domestic party, but a public event for Vilnius residents, which the army always tries to participate in to cultivate patriotism, love and respect for the army.
