= Lituanus =

- Discipline: Lituanistics
- Language: English

Publication details
- History: 1954–present
- Publisher: Lituanus Foundation, Inc. (USA)
- Frequency: Biannual
- Open access: Archive online

Standard abbreviations
- ISO 4: Lituanus

Indexing
- ISSN: 0024-5089

Links
- Journal homepage

Lituanus is an English language quarterly journal dedicated to Lithuanian and Baltic languages, linguistics, political science, arts, history, literature, and related topics. It is published by the non-profit Lituanus Foundation, Inc., and has a worldwide circulation of about 3,000 copies per issue. The first issue was published in 1954 in Chicago, Illinois. Many of the back issues are available free of charge on its website.

Lituanus is abstracted in two internationally recognized abstract services: MLA (Modern Language Association) and IPSA (International Political Science Association). Over the last fifty years, its most frequent editor has been Professor (now Emeritus) Antanas Klimas of the University of Rochester. The journal has featured articles by Czesław Miłosz, Tomas Venclova, Vytautas Kavolis, Jurgis Baltrušaitis, and Vytautas Landsbergis.
