= Van Haren =

Coat of arms of the Van Haren family, part of the Dutch nobility

Van Haren and Van Haaren are Dutch toponymic surnames meaning "from/of Ha(a)ren". A haar was the name for a sandy ridge (plural haren) and there are multiple towns named Haren and Haaren in and around the Low Countries. Historical records and the distribution of the surnames suggest that Haren, North Brabant is often at the origin of both forms of the name, while most other Van Haaren families stem from Haaren, North Brabant. The Dutch noble family Van Haren has 13th-century ties to Castle Haeren in Voerendaal, itself named after the family Van Haren from Castle Borgharen near Maastricht. People with the surname include:

Van Haren

- Adam van Haren (1540–1589), Dutch Geuzen captain and advisor to William the Silent
- Arthur Van Haren Jr. (1920–1992), American World War II fighter pilot
- Carolina Wilhelmina van Haren (1741–1812), Dutch noble, daughter of Onno Zwier
- Elma van Haren (born 1954), Dutch poet
- Onno Zwier van Haren (1713–1779), Dutch noble statesman and writer
- Willem van Haren (1710–1768), Dutch nobleman and poet

Van Haaren

- Dirk van Haaren (1878–1953), Dutch painter
- Heinz van Haaren (born 1940), Dutch-German football midfielder
- John Henry Haaren (1855–1916), American educator and historian
- Marijke van Haaren (born 1952), Dutch CDA politician
- Ramon van Haaren (born 1972), Dutch football defender
- Ricky van Haaren (born 1991), Dutch football midfielder

== See also ==
- Ackermans & van Haaren, Belgian contracting and financial company
- Van Haren, a shoe retailer in the Netherlands, see Christian Louboutin#Trademark litigation
