= Dirk van Hogendorp =

Dutch military officer and politician (1761–1822)

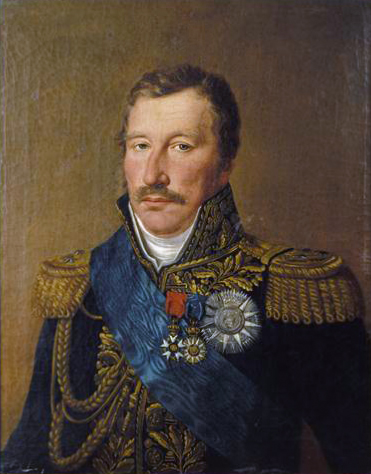
- Dirk van Hogendorp, Comte de l'Empire

Lieutenant-governor of East-Java in the Dutch East India Company
- In office 1794–1798

Minister of War of the Kingdom of Holland
- In office 1806–1807
- Monarch: Louis I

President of the Lithuanian Provisional Governing Commission
- In office 24 August 1812 – 29 September 1812
- Monarch: Frederick Augustus I
- Preceded by: Stanisław Sołtan
- Succeeded by: Stanisław Sołtan

Military governor of Hamburg
- In office 1813–1814

Personal details
- Born: Dirk van Hogendorp; 13 October 1761 Heenvliet
- Died: 29 October 1822 (aged 61) Rio de Janeiro
- Spouses: Margaretha Elisabeth Bartlo (m. 1785) Augusta Eleonora Carolina, Princess von Hohenlohe-Langenburg (m. 1803)
- Children: Carel Sirardus Willem van Hogendorp
- Parents: Willem van Hogendorp (father); Carolina Wilhelmina van Haren (mother)
- Awards: Knight Grand Cross of the Order of the Union; Officier Legion d'Honneur

Military service
- Allegiance: Prussia; Dutch Republic; First French Empire
- Branch/service: (Kingdom of Prussia) Army of Prussia; (Netherlands) Dutch Navy; Grande Armée
- Years of service: 1773 – 1786; 1810 -1814
- Rank: général de division
- Battles/wars: Dutch-Selangor war (1784-1786); War of the Bavarian Succession; Fourth Anglo-Dutch War; French invasion of Russia; War of the Sixth Coalition; Battle of Bautzen; Siege of Hamburg

Dirk van Hogendorp (13 October 1761 – 29 October 1822) was a Dutch military officer, politician, colonial administrator and diplomat. In 1812 he was governor of Vilnius, in 1813 he was appointed as the governor of Hamburg. He was an early critic of the Dutch colonial system as implemented under the VOC. His ideas about reforms in the Dutch East Indies were to a large extent realized by the Commissioners-General of the Dutch East Indies, through the behind the scenes influence of his friend Herman Warner Muntinghe, first as adviser of Stamford Raffles, and later as adviser of the Commissioners-General.

== Life ==
=== Personal life ===
Van Hogendorp was the eldest son of Willem van Hogendorp and his wife, Carolina Wilhelmina van Haren. He was a brother of Gijsbert Karel van Hogendorp. He married Margaretha Elisabeth Bartlo in 1785 in Batavia. They had a son, Carel Sirardus Willem van Hogendorp. After his first wife's death he married Princess Augusta Eleonora Carolina von Hohenlohe-Langenburg in 1803. (Note: She was his niece, a daughter of Frederik Ernst, prince von Hohenlohe-Langenburg and Magdalena Adriana baroness van Haren, a sister of his mother.) The children from this marriage all died before 1813.

=== Youth ===
Around the time of Hogendorp's birth his maternal grandfather, the statesman Onno Zwier van Haren was accused by Hogendorp's mother and her sister Betty of crimen tenfati incestus when they were children. Though Onno signed a confession, and fled the Dutch Republic, he was somehow cleared, and his daughters were disavowed by the family. Hogendorp's mother was divorced by Hogendorp's father because of the scandal. (Note: The scandal is described in Hoogstraten, P.F.Th. van (1876). "De Van Harens". Dietsche Warande. Nieuwe Reeks (DBNL) (in Dutch). 1: 369–388..) This cast a shadow over the early life of the Hogendorp brothers.

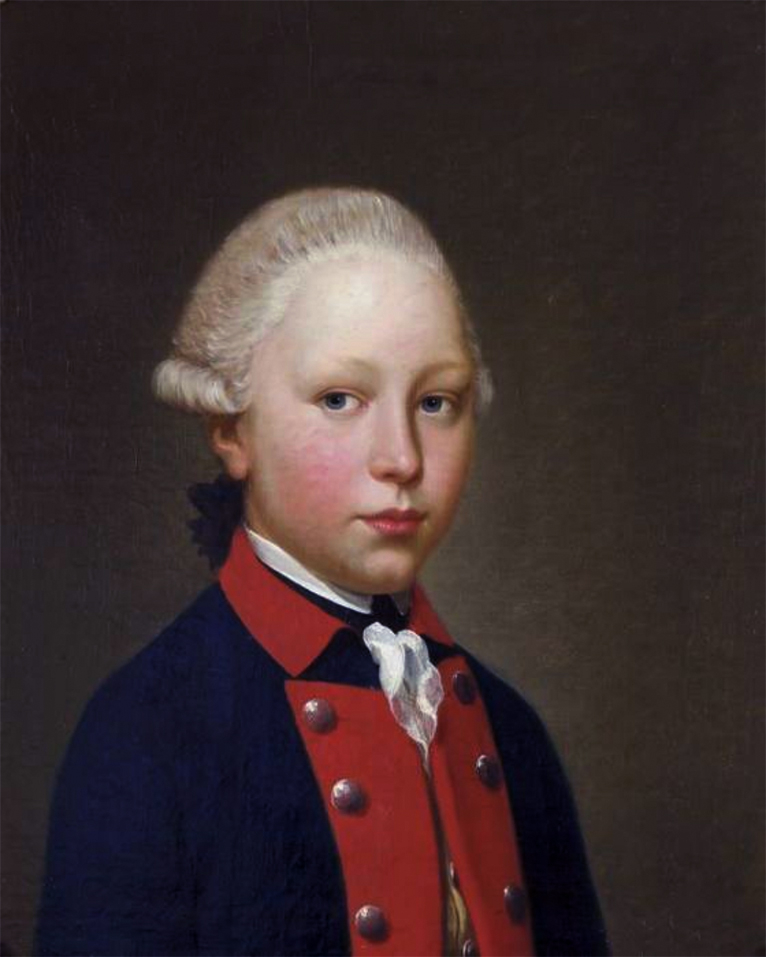
Portrait of Hogendorp as cadet by Benjamin Bolomey, c. 1772

The early life of Hogendorp had been that of a wealthy child, but when he was 12 years old, his father lost his wealth and was forced to take the family to the Dutch East Indies where he got a position with the VOC, thanks to a recommendation from stadtholder William V, Prince of Orange. The two boys were thanks to the stadtholder's wife princess Wilhelmina placed at the Prussian Cadet Corps in Berlin, where they got a military education. Hogendorp received a commission as an ensign with an East Prussian regiment in 1777. He fought in the War of the Bavarian Succession in 1778. He left Prussian service in 1782 (he had reached the rank of captain by then) to enter Dutch service, as the Dutch Republic by then was at war with Great Britain. Princess Wilhelmina for that reason withdrew her protection, but that may have been a reason for her husband to ask admiral Van Kinsbergen to take him into the Dutch Navy. He was placed in 1783 with the Dutch marine corps as a captain, and sent with the expedition of admiral Van Braam to the Dutch Cape Colony in 1784. Meanwhile, the hostilities with Great Britain had ceased, so the expedition sailed on to the Dutch East Indies, where Hogendorp met his father for the last time. (Note: The father left for Patria as expatriate Dutchmen referred to the Dutch Republic, and lost his life in a shipwreck.)

=== In the Dutch East Indies ===
Hogendorp in 1786 joined the VOC as an onderkoopman (assistant merchant). Soon after he became the assistant-resident at Patna in Dutch Bengal. This city was a trade center where both the VOC and the British East India Company had trading posts. He became a friend of the British Governor-General of Bengal lord Cornwallis, and studied the reforms the British implemented around that time. In particular the treatment of the local peasants, who were freed from their status of serfs and became free labor, aroused his admiration. This would inspire the ideas that he would later try to introduce on Java.

In 1788 Hogendorp returned to Java, where he was appointed administrator of Onrust Island. The area was very unhealthy for Europeans and Hogendorp became severely ill. He was repatriated for health reasons in 1790 to Djapara in Central Java, where he became resident. In 1794 he was appointed lieutenant-governor of the eastern part of Java, at Surabaya. In this period he developed the progressive ideas for which he later became known. He put them down in a number of letters to his brother Gijsbert Karel, in which he decried the situation in Java in the waning days of the VOC. Gijsbert Karel brought those writings together in a number of pamphlets bundled under the title Korte en vrije Aanmerkingen over den tegenwoordigen staat der Oost-Indische Maatschappij en de Belangens van den Staat in de Oost-Indische Bezittingen en Handel (Note: Brief and Free Remarks on the Present State of the East India Company, and the Interests of the State in East India Possessions and Trade.) (1792).

He sharply criticized VOC rule on Java for its "feudal" exactions from the population. He proposed extensive changes to the structure of government and finance on Java, including property rights for the Javanese, transforming the 'bupati' into a salaried bureaucracy, and reforming the taxation system, many of which foreshadowed the ideas of Herman Willem Daendels and Stamford Raffles. When in 1795 the regime of the stadtholder in the Batavian Revolution was overthrown, and the Dutch Republic replaced by the Batavian Republic, which made an end to the VOC, which went bankrupt in 1796, and would be nationalized in 1799, the East Indies were placed under a Commission for East-Indies Affairs in the new regime. Hogendorp wrote a Memorandum for them in which he made a number of recommendations for reforms. The new regime sent out a "Commission-General", with Sebastiaan Cornelis Nederburgh and Simon Hendrik Frijkenius as members. Hogendorp had high expectations of them, but he was soon disappointed. Nederburgh took the side of Governor-General Willem Arnold Alting and helped this corrupt official to keep things as they were. They conspired to appoint Johannes Siberg, the son-in-law of Alting, as third Commissioner-General, effectively neutralizing Frijkenius who did not want to join the clique, and took control of the Dutch East Indies. These people took a dim view of Hogendorp and his new ideas. In 1798 they had him arrested for these views and held incommunicado for five months. But in 1799 he escaped on a Danish ship to the Batavian Republic.

Back in Patria the Asiatic Council of the Uitvoerend Bewind made an attempt to have him indicted, to which Hogendorp wrote an apologia, entitled Verdediging aan het Committé tot den O.I. handel en bezittingen, (Note: Defense to the Committee of the East Indies trade and possessions.) and the fiscaal (Note: An official comparable to a Procurator fiscal.) of the council, Herman Warner Muntinghe, refused to indict. (Note: He and Hogendorp would become lifelong friends)

=== Critique of the colonial government ===
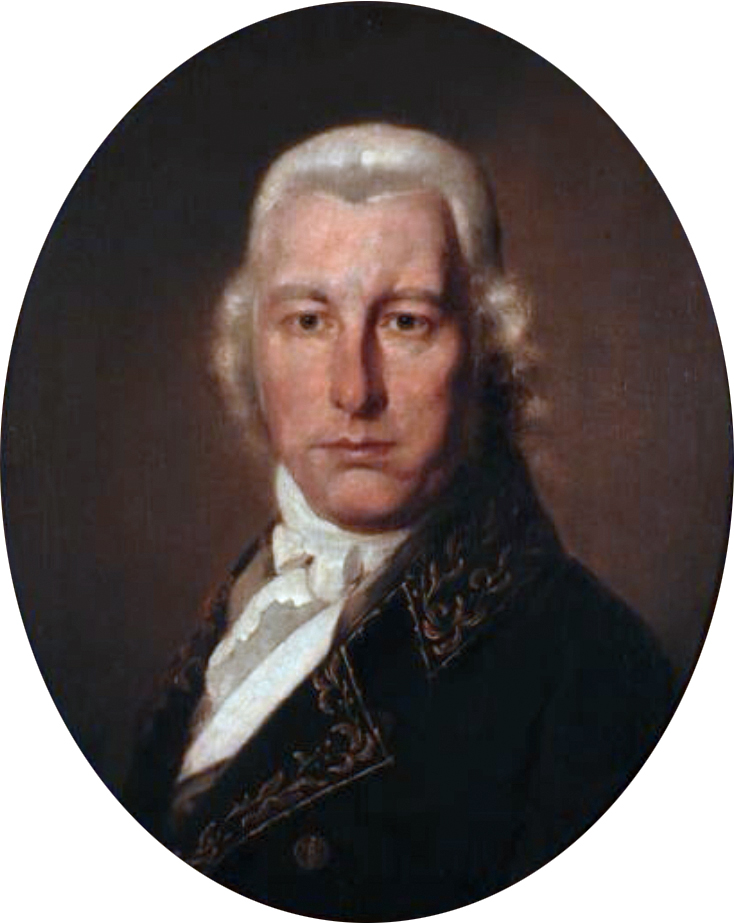
Dirk van Hogendorp in 1803 by Taco Scheltema

In the following period Hogendorp wrote a number of polemical pamphlets of which Bericht van den tegenwoordigen Toestand der Bataafsche Bezittingen in Oost- Indiën en den Handel op dezelve (Note: Report on the Present Condition of the Batavian Possessions in the East Indies and the Trade in the Same.) and Stukken, rakende den tegenwoordigen toestand der Bataafsche bezittingen in Oost-Indië (Note: Documents, touching upon the present condition of the Batavian possessions in the East Indies.) were the most important. The Bericht argued for significant reforms of the regent system in place in Dutch Java, opposed slavery, and called for a more liberal system of government. The previous system was essentially feudal, in which indigenous regents or lords were supported by the Dutch in return for tributes. Pointing to British successes in Bengal, van Hogendorp suggested that by redistributing land to the common Javanese "serf", there would be much more individual incentive to work and thus increased productivity, making the colony more profitable. Under van Hogendorp's plan, the Javanese would be encouraged to plant rice as well as coffee and pepper on drier lands, the Europeans would be able to purchase or lease wastelands, and the Chinese would be allowed to lease lands under the condition that no estates were to be farmed out to them. Furthermore, forced labor would give way to fair wages for laborers, and trade for Dutchmen would be completely open except in the case of the spice and China trades. These ideas drew the attention of the Asiatic Council of the Staatsbewind of the Batavian Republic, which had taken over from the now defunct Heren XVII (directors of the VOC). This council, mandated by the new Constitution of the Batavian Republic (the Staatsregeling of 1801) to draft a "Charter" for the government of the overseas possessions, instituted a commission that was tasked to study such a "Charter" to which both Hogendorp and Nederburgh were appointed. This commission came with a report in 1803.

The draft report, which bears some similarity to the ideas of Abbé Raynal, was rejected by Nederburgh and the old VOC officials who believed it too radical, and who realized that the Dutch depended on the very indigenous rulers, or Regents that the plan would essentially undermine. Furthermore, they held firm to the belief that the colonies existed as mercantile assets, to be exploited for the benefit of the chartered company it was, (Note: A characteristic it shared with the British East India Company.) and rejected any alternatives that would give more rights to either the natives or competitors from other nations. However, the report was influential enough that Hogendorp was able to attain a seat on the committee for drafting a "Charter" to rule Java and other Asiatic possessions, commissioned by the Asiatic Council, that was then (1803) dominated by progressive politicians like Samuel Wiselius and Johannes Neethling. The commission used many of the ideas Hogendorp had first proposed. Its report, that also contained a draft "Charter" for the East Indies (Note: That would later form the basis of the Regeringsreglement that king William I of the Netherlands in 1815 would send along with the Commissioners-General of the Dutch East Indies.) was, however, received with much opposition from the vested interests in the Batavian Republic, and the Staatsbewind prevailed on the Asiatic Council to accommodate those interests. Later the council was purged of its progressive members and the clique around Hogendorps nemesis Nederburgh came to dominate it. Nevertheless, a few years later during the administration of Herman Willem Daendels (Note: Even though Daendels had beaten van Hogendorp to the appointment as the governor-general of Java) as Governor-General, largely on account of both the "bericht" and the state of war the nation found itself in, Hogendorp's ideas proved influential again. Additionally, the report later influenced the administrative policies of Sir Stamford Raffles after the British takeover of Java in 1811, probably through the intermediary of his old friend Muntinghe, who by then had become President of the High Court of the East Indies and was retained as such by Raffles.

=== Diplomatic career ===
After the adoption of the watered-down "Charter" a vacancy appeared to open up in the government of the Indies: Governor-General Johannes Siberg's position had become untenable and the Staatsbewind looked for a replacement. To many Hogendorp seemed to be the obvious choice, but the Staatsbewind prevaricated (Note: Eventually, in 1805, Siberg was replaced by Albertus Henricus Wiese.) and meanwhile another vacancy, this time that of envoy to the Russian court opened up, which Hogendorp accepted in 1803. His sojourn in Saint Petersburg was personally successful: he had a good rapport with Czar Alexander I, who even offered to be a godfather to one of Hogendorp's children, but professionally he had less success: a trade treaty, to which the previous czar, Paul I, had been amenable, did not materialize. Hogendorp did succeed in opening up the navigation through the Dardanelles to the Black Sea for Batavian shipping, but a project to have Russia guarantee the sovereignty of the Republic (in view of the threat of Imperial France), remained unsuccessful. So Hogendorp asked in 1805 for his recall.

Meanwhile, the regime of Grand Pensionary Rutger Jan Schimmelpenninck had been unable to keep Napoleon at bay, and the Batavian Republic was replaced in 1806 by the Kingdom of Holland, with Louis Bonaparte, the brother of Napoleon at its head. The new king saw the talents of Hogendorp and appointed him member of the new Council of State, and made him president of its Affairs of War section in 1806. A few months later he was appointed Minister for War. As such he was tasked with organizing an auxiliary corps of the Dutch army for Napoleon's Grande Armée. He recruited Prussian prisoners of war who were interned in Mainz as mercenaries for this. But he differed with the king about foreign policy and asked in 1807 to be relieved of his office.

His next office was that of envoy extraordinary and minister plenipotentiary to the court of the Austrian Empire, where he arrived in early 1808. (Note: His son Carel, lieutenant in the Dutch army, accompanied him on this mission.) His sojourn was shortened by the invasion of Austria by Napoleon in the course of the War of the Fifth Coalition, which led to the flight of the Austrian Emperor Francis I from Vienna in November 1809, which prompted Hogendorp to return home post-haste. King Louis next reinstalled him at the Council of State, but after a year in that function, just as he was to be sent to the court of king Joseph Bonaparte of Spain, (Note: With whom Louis maintained close relations, not just as a brother, but also as an ally, as he had sent out the Dutch Brigade to support Joseph against the British in the Peninsular War.) Louis' other brother Napoleon forced him to abdicate.

=== Career with Napoleon ===
The annexation to the French Empire in mid 1810 of course was a shock to Hogendorp, but he soon adjusted to the new situation. The governor-general Charles-François Lebrun, who Napoleon sent to govern this new part of his empire, appointed Hogendorp as leader of the Dutch army and navy delegation that was to give homage to Napoleon. Bonaparte hit it off immediately with Hogendorp, who had been an admirer for some time. Napoleon immediately appointed him in a commission that was tasked with the integration of the Dutch area into the Empire. The same year he was appointed général de division in the Grande Armée and aide-de-camp of Napoleon himself. Napoleon created him comte de l'Empire in 1811, and gave him the income of an abbey in Brunswick.

=== Napoleon's invasion of Russia ===
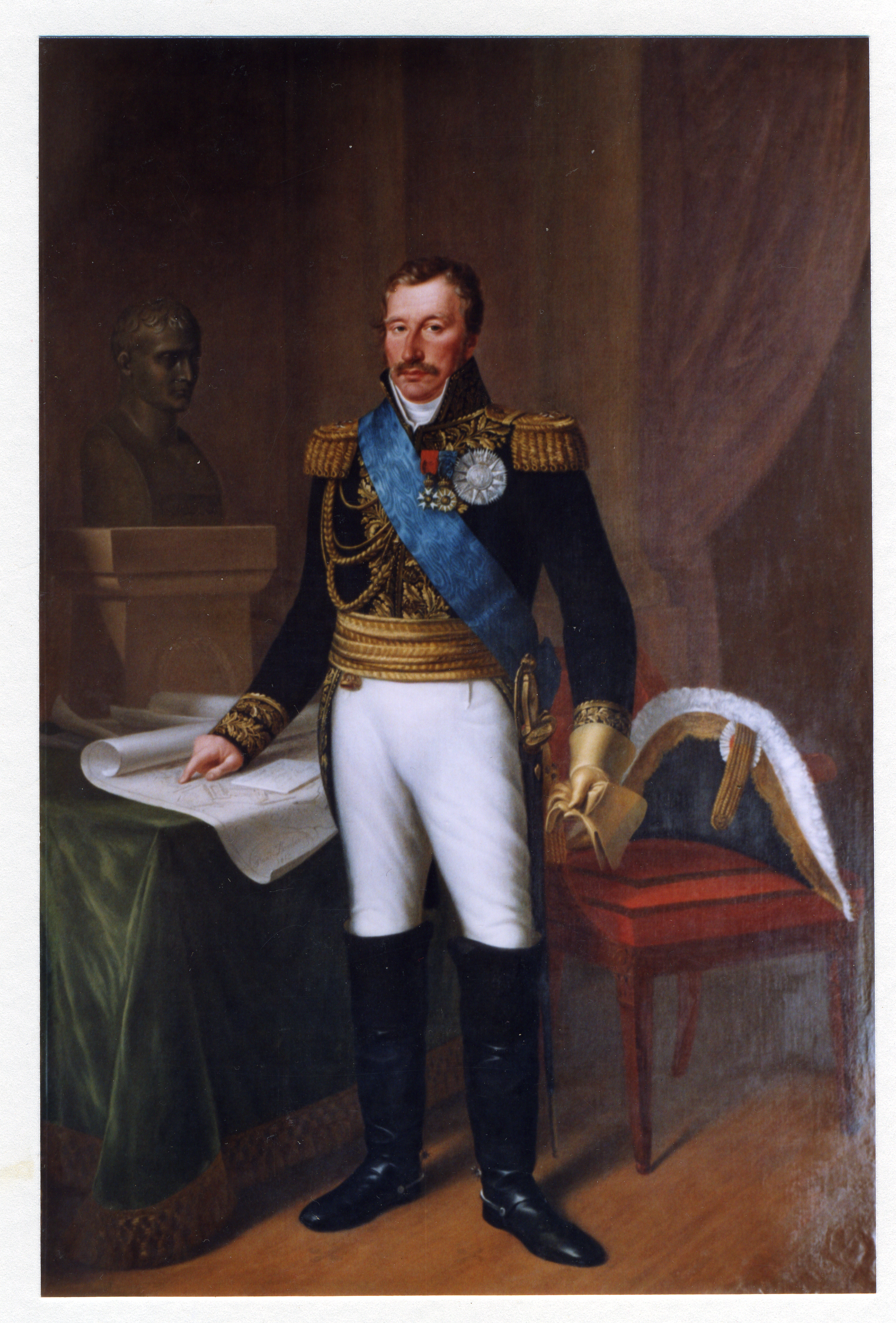
Hogendorp as governor of Hamburg, 1813

When Napoleon invaded Russia in 1812, he appointed Hogendorp in several military governorships, first of Königsberg, later of Vilna in what was then a part of Russia, as Lithuania had been annexed by that country. He had to rule with an iron fist to be able to supply the French army, and to organize an auxiliary Lithuanian corps for the Grande Armée. In early December 1812, Louis Henri Loison was sent with a reserve division of 10,000 newly drafted German and Italian boys to help extricate the remains of the Grande Armée in its retreat. Either Hogendorp or Joachim Murat stupidly ordered him to defend the road to Smurgainys. At night-time, the soldiers were camping on the ground and the temperature dropped to minus 35 degrees Celsius, which proved catastrophic for them. Within a few days, a division of 15,000 soldiers was wiped out without a fight. (Note: According to Mullié, Loison was censured by Napoleon after the 1812 Vilnius incident. Chandler stated that the censure came in 1813 at Wesel.)

As his position became untenable, Hogendorp retreated by way of Königsberg and Berlin to Paris, where he arrived on 8 February 1813. An attack of podagra initially laid him low, but he soon was sufficiently recuperated that he could rejoin Napoleon before the battle of Bautzen on 20 May 1813. Next Napoleon made him military governor of Hamburg, under Marshall Louis-Nicolas Davout, during the Siege of Hamburg, where he earned a strongly negative reputation.

=== After the Napoleonic Wars ===
After the surrender of Hamburg in 1814, Hogendorp offered his services to the sovereign prince William I of the Netherlands in the Sovereign Principality of the United Netherlands, under which name the Netherlands had reemerged from the French occupation, mainly thanks to the exertions of Hogendorp's brother Gijsbert Karel, who as a member of the Triumvirate of 1813 had led the insurrection against the French occupiers in 1813. But the offer was rejected, though he was offered a pension by the new government. His brother tried to get him the post of Governor-General of the Dutch East Indies, when the Dutch government in 1814 was preparing for the return of that colony under the Anglo-Dutch Treaty of 1814, but the Sovereign Prince declined that advise, and Gijsbert Karel soon turned to other candidates, like Daendels.

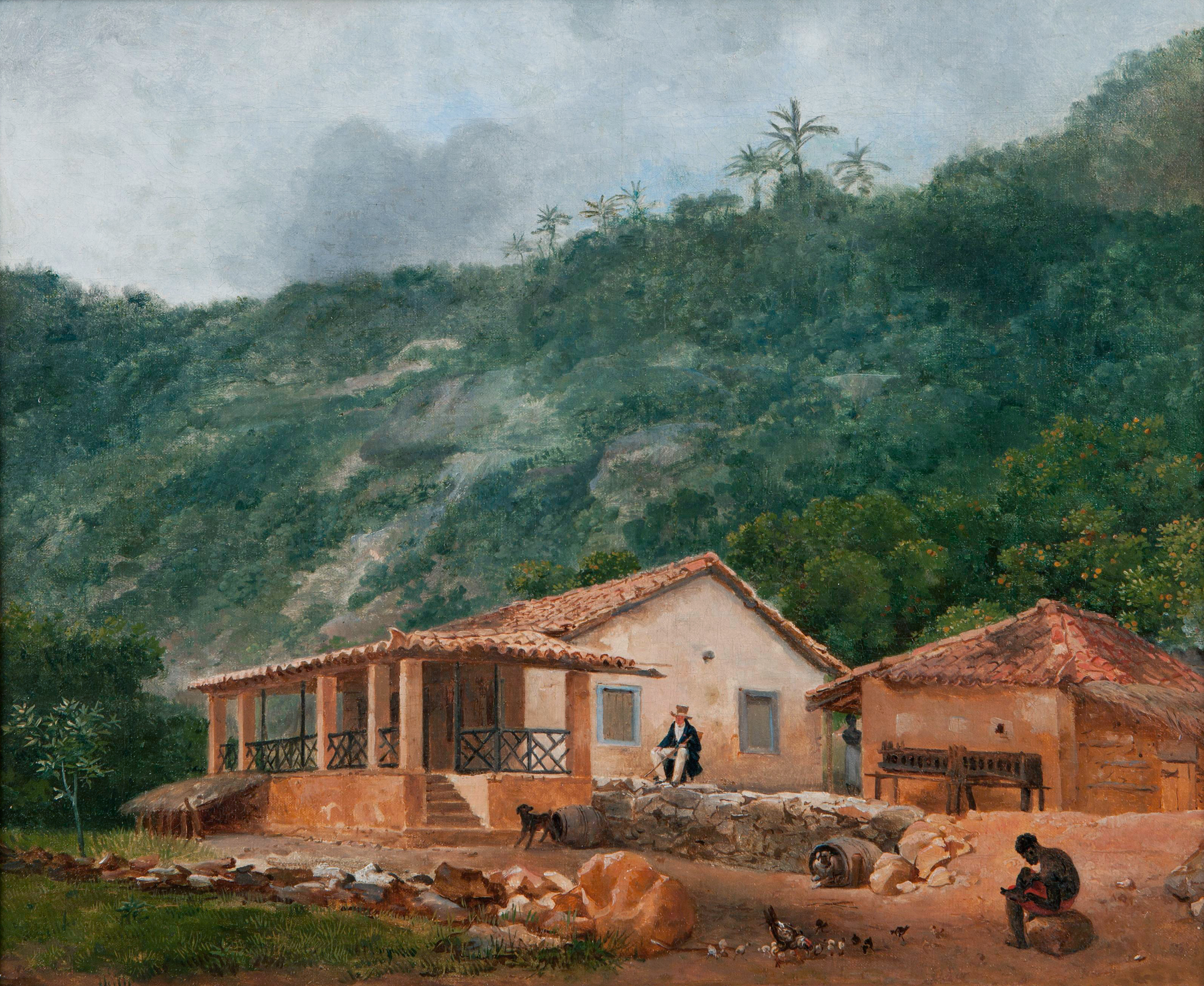
Hogendorp on his plantation Novo Sion

When Napoleon escaped from Elba, beginning the Hundred Days, Hogendorp made the mistake of immediately traveling to France to offer his services. Napoleon made him governor of Nantes. After Napoleon lost the Battle of Waterloo Hogendorp's role was of course ended. He was no longer welcome in the new Kingdom of the United Netherlands, just like that other admirer of Napoleon, Carel Hendrik Ver Huell. Ver Huell thrived, but Hogendorp had to find refuge with the family of his daughter-in-law near Calais. There he wrote Du système colonial de la France sous les rapports de la politique et du commerce which was published in 1817, but did not have the success Hogendorp hoped. When Napoleon died in 1821 it turned out that he had bequeathed 100,000 francs to Hogendorp. This news arrived just as Hogendorp himself, after his death on 29 October 1822, was buried in Rio de Janeiro in the Brazil, then part of the United Kingdom of Portugal, Brazil and the Algarves. Van Hogendorp lived his last years on a small plantation, named Novo Sion operated by slaves owned by van Hogendorp, growing coffee and oranges.

== Publications ==
- Brief van Dirk van Hogendorp aan alle vrijheid- en vaderlandlievende Bataven in Nederlandsch Oost-Indië enz. Bombay, 9 January 1799.
- Berigt van den tegenwoordigen toestand der Batavische bezittingen in Oost-Indië en den handel op dezelve. Delft, December 1799, 2nd ed. Delft 1800.
- Ontwerp om de Oost-Indische Compagnie te herstellen tot een handeldrijvend ligchaam, 's-Gravenhage 1801.
- Antwoord op het onderzoek der gronden van het stelsel an D. van Hogendorp, 's-Gravenhage 1802.
- Nadere uitlegging en ontwikkeling van het stelsel van Dirk van Hogendorp, en antwoord op het werk van S.C. Nederburgh, getiteld: Verhandeling over de Vragen enz. 1802.
- Aanmerkingen op het adres van participanten der Nederlandsche O.I. Compagnie aan het Staatsbewind der Bataafsche Republiek, 's-Gravebhage 1802.
- Brief van Sir George Dallas aan Sir William Pulteney, beide leden van het Engelsche parlement, over het verschil tusschen de Oost-Indische Compaynie en den vrijen handel in Engeland, 's-Gravenhage 1802.
- Ontwerp om de O.I. Compagnie dezer landen in haren vorigen bloei te herstellen, 's-Gravednhage and Amsterdam 1802.
- Memorie ter wederlegging van de nadeelige geruchten en lasteringen, welke tegen hem uitgestrooid zijn gedurende hij gouverneur was van Hamburg, 's-Gravenhage and Amsterdam 1814.
- Staat- en handelkundige beschouwing van het Koloniaal systema in Frankrijk, uit het Fransch. Amsterdam 1817. (Note: Du système colonial de la France sous les rapports de la politique et du commerce.)

=== Playwright: Kraspoekol ===
As a curiosity: Van Hogendorp published a play entitled "Kraspoekol, of de slavernij, een tafereel der zeden van Nederlandsch Indië", Delft 1800. And "... six months after the publication of this play, with his name to it, he attempted to have it represented on the stage at The Hague, on 20 March 1801; but the East Indies Gentry, not thinking it proper to exhibit the most illustrious actions of themselves and their noble ancestors upon a stage to vulgar European spectators, went to the play provided with little half-penny whistles and trumpets, and kept up such a tremendous whistling and trumpeting from the very moment the curtain began to be drawn up, that not a syllable of the play could be heard – and, if these Gentlemen could, they would also have extinguished the candles, to keep in darkness what themselves and their ancestors never intended for the light. In short, the play, after being thus interrupted the whole of the first act, was broken off before the second, when the manager was obliged to give up the entertainment. The next day the ignorant part of the audience was so curious to know the secrets which these East India Gentlemen had been thus industrious to conceal, that the bookseller (as he told me himself) sold infinitely more copies of the play that day than all he had sold the whole of the preceding six months, and had he ten times more, they would not have answered the numerous demands."

== Bibliography ==
- Aa, A. J. van der, ed. (1867). "Dirk, graaf van Hogendorp". Biografisch Woordenboek der Nederlanden. Deel 8, Tweede Stuk (DBNL) (in Dutch). pp. 932–939.
- Bastin, J. (1953–1954). "The rivalry between Dirk van Hogendorp and S.C. Nederburgh : a contemporary English 'translation' of the 'Berigt'". Indonesië. 7: 80–85.
- Blok, P.J.; Molhuysen, P.C., eds. (1927). "Hogendorp, Dirk van". Nieuw Nederlandsch biografisch woordenboek (DBNL) (in Dutch). Sijthoff. pp. 608–613.
- Cribb, Robert. Historical dictionary of Indonesia. p. 189.
- Day, Clive (1904). The Policy and Administration of the Dutch in Java. Macmillan Company. pp. 134–142.
- Hogendorp, Dirk van. Account of the Present State of the Batavian Possessions in the East Indies & of their Trade in the same also some Ideas on Reforming & Improving. The Government thereof. Dedicated to His Country & its Governors.
- Hogendorp, Dirk van (1887). Mémoires du général Dirk van Hogendorp, comte de l'empire, etc. The Hague.
- Macedo, R. (1983). "Cronologia Do General De Napoleao, Conde Dirk Van Hogendorp". Revista do Instituto Histórico e Geográfico Brasileiro (341). Brazil: 21–25.
- Oranje, D.J.P. (1936). "Het beleid der Commissie Generaal; de uitwerking der beginselen van 1815 in het Regeerings Reglement van 1818 (dissertation)". bibliotheek.nl (in Dutch). Utrecht.
- Schutte, G. J. (1974). De Nederlandse patriotten en de koloniën: Een onderzoek naar hun denkbeelden en optreden, 1770–1800 [The Dutch Patriots and the colonies. An inquiry into the ideas and practices of the Dutch Enlightenment with regard to the colonies, 1770–1800].
- Sillem, J. A. (1890). Dirk van Hogendorp (1761–1822) naar grootendeels onuitgegeven bronnen bewerkt. Amsterdam: P. N. van Kampen & zoon.
- Wurtzburg, C.E. (1984). Raffles of the Eastern Isles. Oxford University Press.
- Zamoyski, Adam (2004). Moscow 1812: Napoleon's Fatal March. Harper. ISBN 0-06-108686-X.
