= Haaren =

Haaren may refer to:

== Places ==
- Haaren (Aachen), a district of Aachen, Germany
- Haaren, North Brabant, a town in North Brabant, Netherlands
- Haaren (river), of Lower Saxony, Germany

== People ==
- Dirk van Haaren (1878–1953), Dutch painter
- Heinz van Haaren (born 1940), Dutch footballer
- John Henry Haaren (1855–1916), American educator and historian
- Marijke van Haaren (born 1952), Dutch politician
- Ramon van Haaren (born 1972), Dutch footballer
- Ricky van Haaren (born 1991), Dutch footballer

== See also ==
- Haren (disambiguation)
