= LoCicero Triangle =

Green space in Queens, New York

Coordinates: 40°44′2.15″N 73°43′24.1″W

Frank P. LoCicero Triangle is a 250-square-foot (23 m^{2}) triangular public green space located in the Bellerose neighborhood of Queens, New York, United States.

== Description ==
The park is named in honor of local resident Frank P. LoCicero (1918-1997) who lived in the area from 1950 until his death. In the years between, LoCicero was an active member and later president of the Bellerose Hillside Civic Association, which fought to maintain the suburban character of the neighborhood.

Born in Manhattan, LoCicero studied art at Haaren High School in Manhattan and at age 17, was the youngest person at the time to have a sculpture exhibited at the Metropolitan Museum of Art. Following graduation from college, he was hired by Norcross Greeting Cards as its graphic designer. During World War II, LoCicero enlisted in the U.S. Army, spending five years in Hawaii drawing aerial maps for the Army before resuming work at Norcross.

LoCicero Triangle is bounded by Hillside Avenue, Cross Island Parkway, and 84th Road. The triangle's shape is the result of the construction of Cross Island Parkway in 1939, which cut through the street grid, leaving in places triangular plots that were too small for development. In 2002, the City Council passed legislation to name the triangle for LoCicero. The park contains trees, shrubs, and a memorial plaque for LoCicero.
