= Józef Sierakowski =

Polish-Lithuanian historian and politician

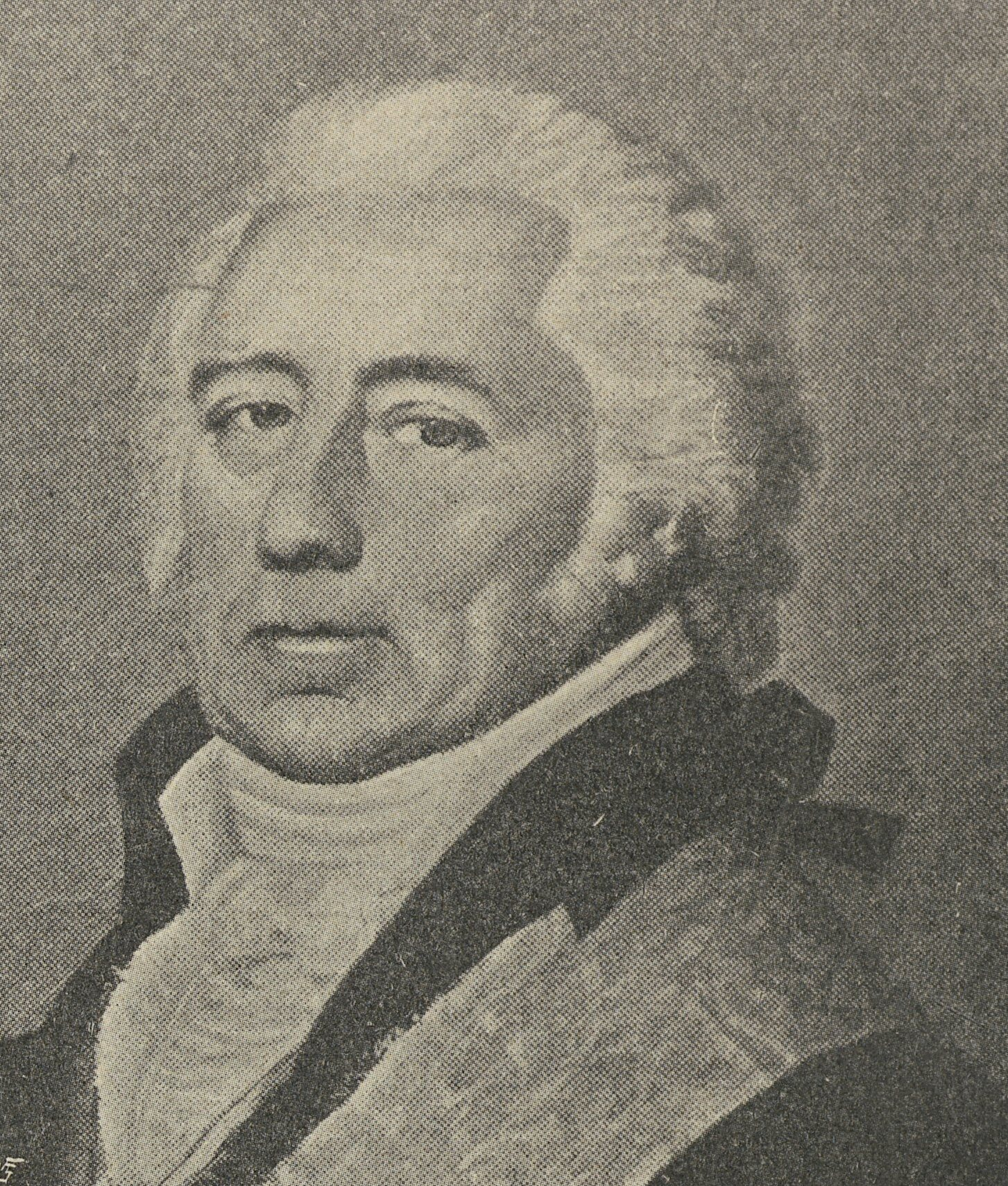

President of the Lithuanian Provisional Governing Commission
- Acting
- In office 1 July 1812 – 18 July 1812
- Monarch: Frederick Augustus I
- Preceded by: office established
- Succeeded by: Stanisław Sołtan

Personal details
- Born: 1765
- Died: 28 May 1831 (aged 65–66)
- Political party: Patriotic Party (1788-1792)

Józef Sierakowski (1765 – 28 May 1831) was a Polish-Lithuanian historian, diplomat and politician who served as President of the Lithuanian Provisional Governing Commission in during the French invasion of Russia in 1812 and a member of the Supreme Examination Commission of Congress Poland in 1829.

== Career ==
He was a secretary of the Polish-Lithuanian diplomatic mission in Stockholm from 1789 to 1792, and travelled across Europe after the Partitions of Poland. Ideologically a republican, he was a member of the Lithuanian deputation to Napoleon in Tilsit in 1807.

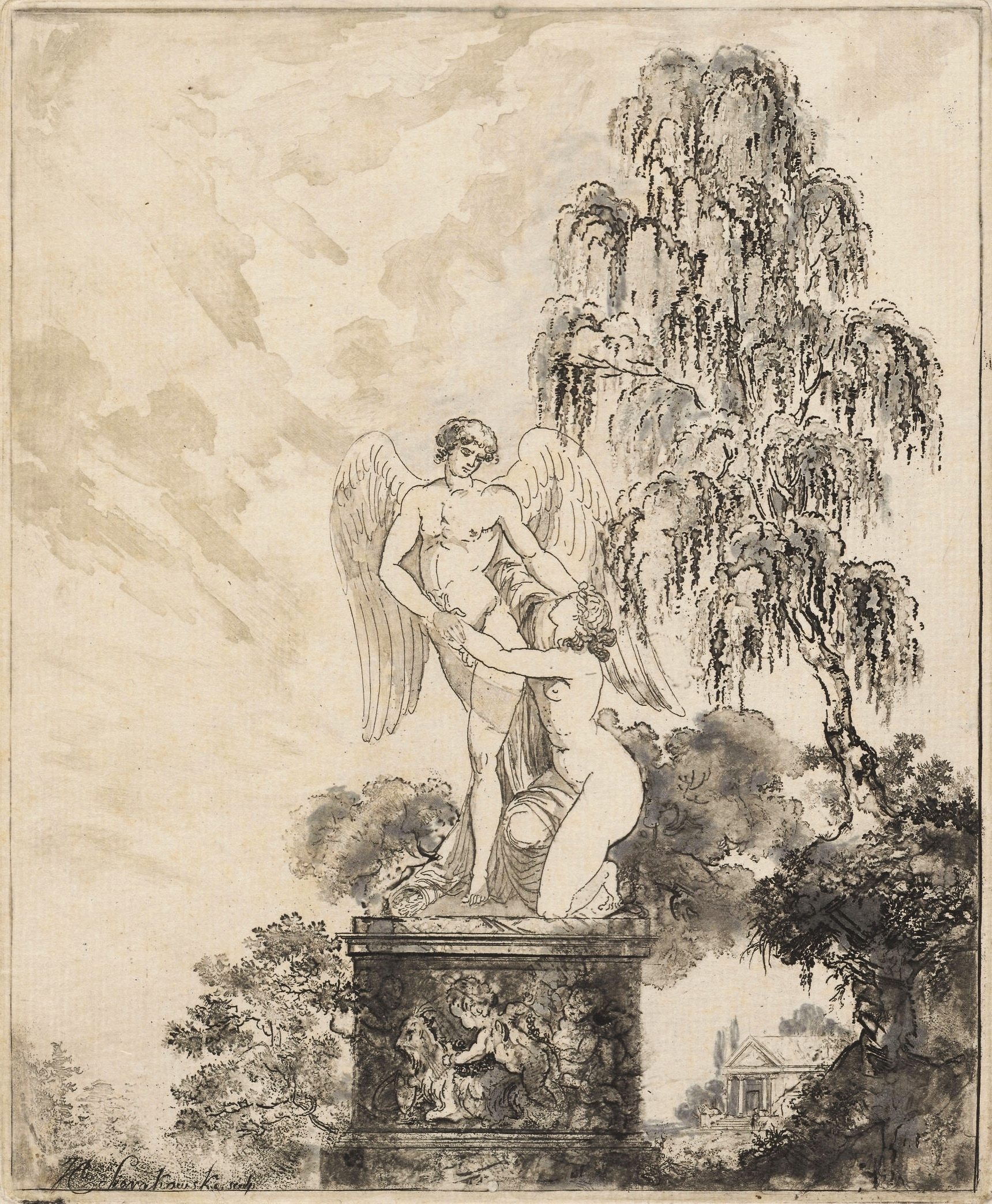
A statue of Amor and Psyche in a garden of imaginative near a neoclassical-romantic residence by Sierakowski, around 1800

After Grande Armée captured Vilnius in on 1 July 1812, he became a member of the Lithuanian provisional government after he was replaced by Stanisław Sołtan.

After the Napoleonic Wars, he was a member of government Commission of Religious and Enlightenment Affairs prior to the November Uprising.

He belonged to the Warsaw Society of Friends of Learning and researched the history of the Slavs. His known work is About Slavic Mythology.

He was the Knight of the Order of St. Stanislaus, Knight of Malta and an Officier of the Legion of Honour.
