= Stanisław Sołtan =

Polish-Lithuanian statesman (1756–1836)

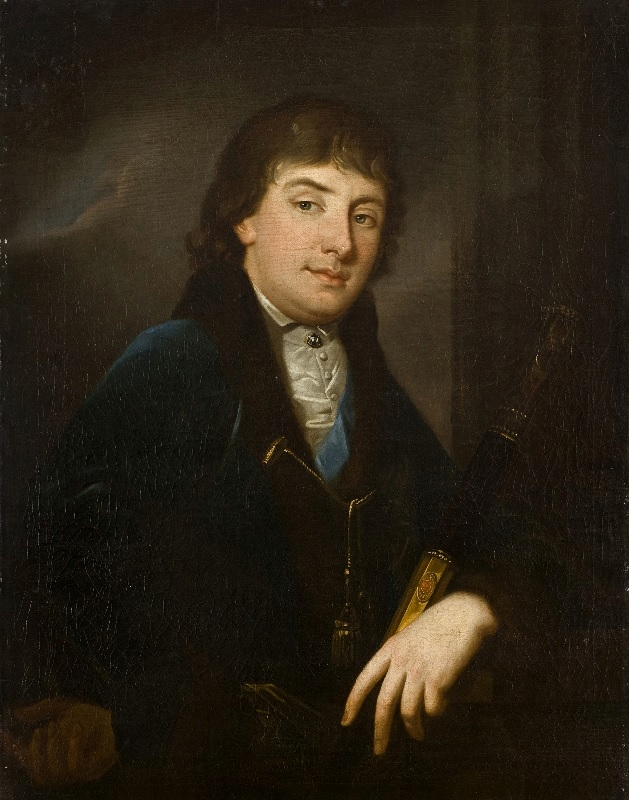

President of the Lithuanian Provisional Governing Commission
- In office 18 July 1812 – 24 August 1812
- Monarch: Frederick Augustus I
- Preceded by: Józef Sierakowski (acting)
- Succeeded by: Dirk van Hogendorp
- In office 29 September 1812 – 14 December 1812 (de facto); July 1813 (de jure)
- Monarch: Frederick Augustus I
- Preceded by: Dirk van Hogendorp
- Succeeded by: office dissolved

Personal details
- Born: 1756
- Died: 1836 (aged 79–80)
- Party: Patriotic Party (1788–1792)

Stanisław Pereświet-Sołtan (1756 – 1836) was a Polish-Lithuanian statesman and military officer who served as major general of the Army of the Grand Duchy of Lithuania since 1782, a two-time President of the Lithuanian Provisional Governing Commission during the French invasion of Russia in 1812 and a freemason.

== Career ==
He was a member of the Great Sejm from the noble estate and Slonim constituency. A member of the Patriotic Party and Society of the Friends of the Constitution, supported the 3rd of May Constitution and opposed King Stanisław II August's joining Targowica condederation. After the defeat in the War in Defense of the Constitution, he was briefly forced to exile to Saxony, then arrested by Russians and briefly sentenced to stay in Kazan. After his release, he became a head of Lithuanian provisional government established by the French during Napoleon's war against Russia, once from 18 July to 24 August 1812 and again from 29 September 1812 until its dissolution.

After the Napoleonic Wars, he was the owner of Zdzięcioł, but Russian authorities took the vicinity away from his son because of the participation in the 1830 November Uprising.

He is mentioned in Pan Tadeusz, a Polish national epic poem written by Adam Mickiewicz.
