= George Stade =

American novelist

George Stade (November 25, 1933 - February 26, 2019) was an American literary scholar, critic, novelist and professor at Columbia University.

According to Stade's obituary in The Washington Post, he was "probably best known for helping to spearhead the study of popular fiction in the classroom, and for his frequent — and frequently acerbic — reviews and essays on contemporary literature."

== Early life and education ==
Stade was born to George Comins and Eva Aaronsen Comins on November 25, 1933.Comins abandoned the family before Stade's second birthday. Stade spent the next several years with his mother in her native Sweden. Kurt Stade, a hairdresser from Germany accompanied them until the World War II drove them back to the United States in 1939. Kurt and Eva opened a successful beauty parlor on West 96th Street, and married in 1941. George assumed the last name "Stade" in 1945.

Stade spent most of the rest of his life on the Upper West Side of Manhattan. In his teenage years he worked construction, formed a street gang, and attended Haaren High School, a “dismal all boys school” according to his unpublished memoir. He then went to the City College of New York for a year, but transferred to St. Lawrence University at the urging of his mother, who was concerned about the company he was keeping.

Stade graduated St. Lawrence in 1955, received his M.A. from Columbia in 1958, and received his PhD in English at Columbia in 1965 after defending his dissertation, “Robert Graves on Poetry.”

At St. Lawrence Stade met his future wife Dorothy “Dolly” Stade. They married in 1956 and had four children: Bjorn, Eric, Nancy, and Kirsten. They would remain together until her death in 2013.

== Professional career ==
Stade had a deep attachment to New York City and taught at Columbia for the duration of his academic career. Stade specialized in 20th-century British and American literature, and taught courses in modern and postmodern American fiction, 20th-century British fiction, British and American poetry, Humanities, and modern criticism.

Stade's literary interests included not only James Joyce, William Faulkner, and Samuel Beckett, but also Dashiell Hammett, Bram Stoker, Stephen King and practitioners of other genres held in low esteem by academics. Stade's course on the postmodern American novel was known colloquially as “shit lit” and was highly sought after by students. His eclectic and subversive literary tastes were on the vanguard of the movement to read genre fiction as serious cultural commentary.

== Literary work ==
Stade published the controversial satirical novel Confessions of a Lady Killer—about a flamboyantly carnivorous serial killer who targets feminists—in 1982. Sex and Violence: A Love Story (2005), Stade's second novel, concerned a string of sexually motivated murders happening within a university. His third novel Love is War (2006), invoked themes of love, sex, and murder that are evident throughout his entire literary career. Swimming Through Flotsam in Which We Live and Move and Have Our Being, the author's final novel, is set in a society ravaged by a plague.

Stade also published regularly in both academic and popular publications, writing articles, reviews, and introductions for the Partisan Review, The New York Review of Books, Hudson Review, Paris Review, Harper's Magazine, Nation, New Republic, and The New York Times Book Review.

Stade acted as the Consulting Editor Director of Barnes and Noble Classics and Editor-in-Chief of Scribner's British Writers Series and the fourteen-volume European Writers Series.
