= Lithuanian Provisional Governing Commission =

Administrative body for Lithuania

Grand Duchy of Lithuania
- July 1812–December 1812
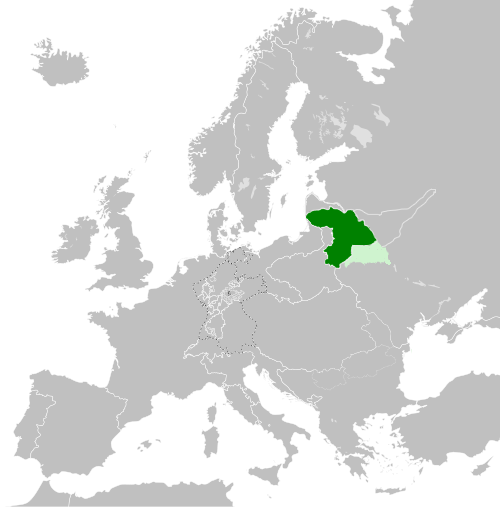
- The territories under the control of the Lithuanian Provisional Commission at its territorial peak in 1812.
- Status: Short-lived unrecognized client state of the French Empire, personal union with the Duchy of Warsaw and the Kingdom of Saxony
- Capital: Vilnius
- Common languages: Polish; French; Belarusian; Lithuanian
- Demonym: Lithuanian
- Government: Constitutional monarchy
- Grand Duke
  - 1812–1813: Frederick Augustus I
- President
  - 1812 (first): Józef Sierakowski
  - 1812–1813 (last): Stanisław Sołtan
- History
  - Declared: 1 July July 1812
  - Joining the General Confederation of the Kingdom of Poland: 14 July 1812
  - Russian conquest of Lithuanian territory: December 1812
  - Dissolution of the government-in-exile: 30 April December 1812
Preceded by	Succeeded by
Russian Empire	Russian Empire
- Today part of: Lithuania; Poland; Belarus

The Provisional Government Commission of the Grand Duchy of Lithuania; also, the Lithuanian Provisional Governing Commission (Lithuanian: Lietuvos laikinosios vyriausybės komisija; also Lietuvos Didžiosios Kunigaikštystės vyriausybės komisija, Polish: Komisja Rządu Tymczasowego Wielkiego Księstwa Litewskiego; also Komisja Rządząca Tymczasowa Litewska; French: Gouvernement provisoire de Lituanie; also Gouvernement général de la Lituanie) was a provisional administrative body for Lithuania, which had been overtaken by Napoleon's Grand Army during the 1812 French invasion of Russia. Because of that fact, the entity is sometimes called Napoleonic Lithuania. On 14 July 1812 the Commission formally joined the General Confederation of the Kingdom of Poland, creating the united Kingdom of Poland.

== History ==
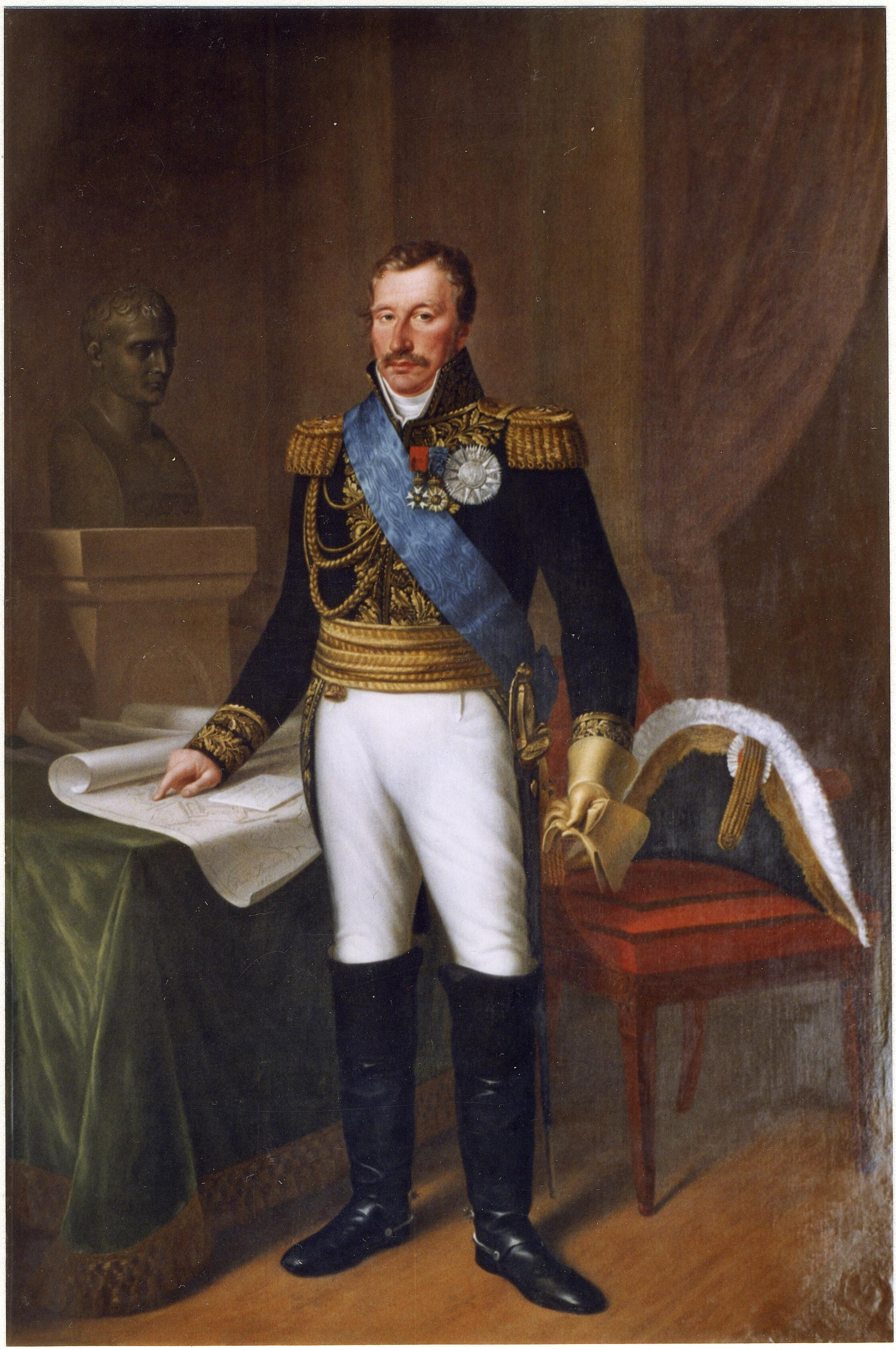
Dirk van Hogendorp

The commission was established on 1 July 1812 by order of French Emperor Napoleon Bonaparte. Its chief tasks included the creation of Lithuanian armed forces, and the provisioning of Napoleon's troops. The governates (later changed to "departments") of Vilnius, Grodno, Minsk and Białystok were attached to the jurisdiction of the government of Lithuania.

Central, regional and local bodies of the civil administration of the 4 provinces were subordinated to him. Departments were divided into divisions headed by sub-prefects. In each of them, and later in the Vitebsk and Mogilev departments (not subordinate to the government, subordinate to the military governor Charpentier), an administrative commission of 3 members, appointed or approved by Napoleon, was organized under the chairmanship of the French quartermaster. The structure of municipal (city) self-government was organized according to the example of Vilnius. At the same time, a system of military-administrative management of the region was created. The bodies of the Napoleonic administration were mainly involved in the organization of armed formations, provision of troops, and collection of funds.

The Provisional Government of Lithuania, initially, had no connections to Poland.

Supervision of the commission was entrusted to the former French Resident in the Duchy of Warsaw, Commissioner Louis Pierre Édouard Bignon. Actual power, however, was exercised by Dutch General Dirk van Hogendorp, former governor of Java, who was appointed governor of Vilnius.

Napoleon, contrary to the hopes reposed in him by the General Confederation of the Kingdom of Poland, had not restored Polish statehood to the former Polish–Lithuanian lands. He had merely established, in the conquered territories, a provisional administration, thereby sidestepping final dispositions pending his further conquest of Russia.

Józef Wybicki, sent on 11 July 1812 to Vilnius with a deputation from the Council of the General Confederation, unsuccessfully attempted to get the Emperor to declare the restoration of the Kingdom of Poland, including the territories that had been annexed in the Partitions of Polish-Lithuanian Commonwealth. Napoleon also refused to attach the military units consisting of Lithuanians to the Polish ones.

Only on 14 July 1812 the Commission formally joined the General Confederation of the Kingdom of Poland, creating the united Kingdom of Poland.

After Russian troops invaded Lithuanian territory at the end of 1812, the Commission acted outside Lithuania.

== Presidents ==
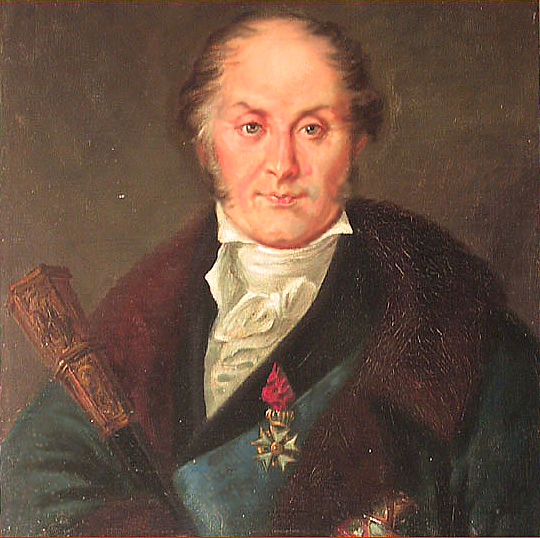
Stanisław Sołtan

- Józef Sierakowski (to July 18, 1812)
- Stanisław Sołtan (to August 24, 1812)
- Dirk van Hogendorp (to September 1812)
- Stanisław Sołtan (to September 1813)

Secretary General: Józef Ignacy Kossakowski

== Members ==
- Louis Pierre Édouard, Baron Bignon
- Aleksander Stanisław Potocki
- Aleksander Antoni Sapieha
- Jan Śniadecki

== Sources ==
- Janusz Iwaszkiewicz, Litwa w roku 1812 (Lithuania in 1812), Warsaw, 1912.
- Marian Kukiel, Wojna 1812 roku (The 1812 War), Kraków, 1937.
- A. Rembowski, "Konfederacja Generalna i pospolite ruszenie w roku 1812" ("The General Confederation and Levee en Masse in 1812"), Biblioteka Warszawska (The Warsaw Library), vol. 1, 1896, fascicle 3, pp. 478–514; vol. 2, 1896, fascicle 1, pp. 67–86.
- Władysław Zajewski, Józef Wybicki, Warsaw, 1983.
- БЕЛАРУСЬ І НАПАЛЕОН: 200 ГАДОЎ Міхась ГАЛДЗЕНКОЎ "Аналітычная газэта «Сакрэтныя дасьледаваньні»
