= Haren =

Haren may refer to:

== Places ==
- Haren, Brussels, Belgium
  - Haren Prison on the outskirts of Brussels, Belgium
- Haren, Germany (Lower Saxony)
- Haren, Groningen, Netherlands
  - Hortus Haren, a botanical garden in Groningen
  - Project X Haren, a 2012 event that started out as a public invitation through Facebook to a birthday party in Groningen, but ended up as a riot by thousands of youths
- Haren, North Brabant, Netherlands

== People ==
- Haren Bhumij, Indian politician
- Haren Das, Indian artist
- Haren S. Gandhi, Indian-American engineer
- Haren Pandya, Indian politician from Gujarat
- Dan Haren, baseball pitcher
- Piotr Haren (born 1970), Danish footballer

== See also ==
- Haaren (disambiguation)
- Haren railway station (disambiguation)
- Horan
