= Haaren High School =

Former public school in New York City

Coordinates: 40.77021°N 73.98832°W

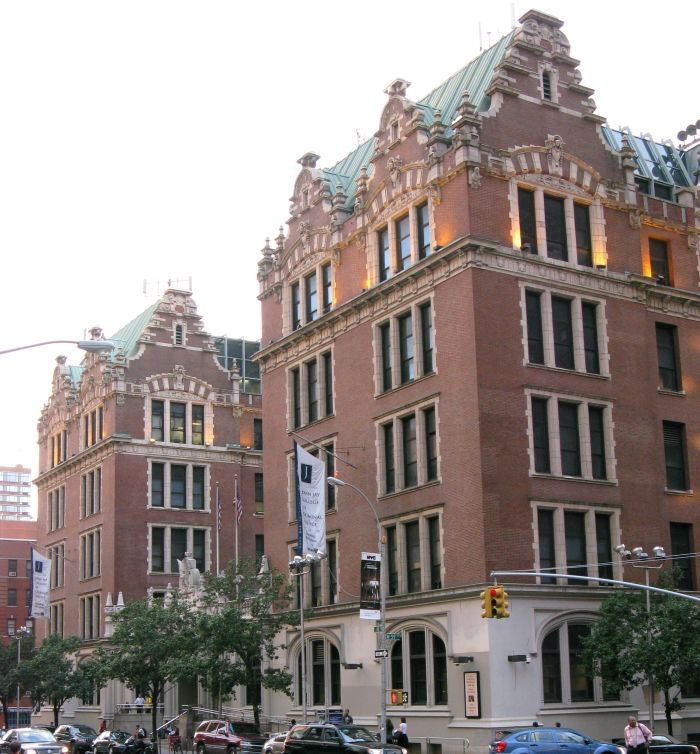
The former Haaren High School building in 2008, which is now known as Haaren Hall

Haaren High School was a public high school in the Midtown Manhattan area of New York City in New York, United States. It was located at 899 Tenth Avenue, between 58th Street and 59th Street, in the Hell's Kitchen neighborhood.

The building was designed by Charles B. J. Snyder and was originally constructed in 1903 to house DeWitt Clinton High School. When that school relocated to the Bronx in 1929, the building became home to Haaren High School until it closed in the late 1970s. Named for educator John Henry Haaren, the school was noted for its vocational program, including classes focusing on internal combustion engines.

After developers announced plans to renovate the building to create offices, production studios and retail stores, John Jay College purchased the structure in 1988 and remodeled it to house offices, a library, classrooms and other facilities. It is now known as Haaren Hall.

== Notable alumni ==
- Herman Badillo (1929–2014), first Puerto Rican-American U.S. congressman
- Mario Biaggi (1917–2015), decorated policeman and US Congressman
- Edd Byrnes, actor
- Ron Carey (1936–2008), president of the International Brotherhood of Teamsters
- Ed Feingersh, 1950s photojournalist
- Padraic Fiacc, Irish poet
- Robert García, New York Assemblyman and congressman
- David Greenglass, 1950s Soviet spy
- Joe Hayes, Taekwondo fighter and champion
- Lynbert Johnson, NBA player
- Robert Mitchum (1917–1997), actor
- Pedro Pietri, Nuyorican poet
- Paul Rand, graphic designer and illustrator
- Albert Salmi, actor
- Ray Santos (1928–2019), Grammy Award-winning Latin musician
- George Stade, novelist and Columbia literature professor
- James Victor, actor
- John Worth, president and executive director of the Academy of Model Aeronautics
