= Haren railway station =

Haren railway station may refer to

- Haren (Ems) station in Germany
- Haren (NL) railway station in the Netherlands
- Haren railway station (Brussels) in Belgium

== See also ==
- Haren-South railway station, Brussels
