= Carolina Wilhelmina van Haren =

Dutch noble (1741–1812)

Carolina Wilhelmina van Haren (25 April 1741 - 23 November 1812) was a Dutch noble, and an alleged victim in the famous van Haren incest court case of 1761. The case was a scandal in contemporary Netherlands, where it caused a debate on whether the allegations were accurate or a political conspiracy against her father. It is the subject of research and fiction, a novel and a play.

She was the daughter of the noble and minister Onno Zwier van Haren (1713-1779) and Sara Hüls (1718-1793). In 1760 she married the lawyer Willem van Hogendorp (1735-1784). In the same year, Carolina Wilhelmina van Haren and her invalid sister Elisabeth (Betje) privately accused their father of sexual abuse. The exact circumstances vary greatly from version to version, and the actual course of events is unclear. In one version, they were allegedly encouraged by the Carolina's betrothed, because his family refused to consent to the marriage unless her father resigned his post as cabinet minister.

In another version, Carolina's fiancé (or in some tellings, the husbands or fiancés of both Carolina and Elisabeth) approached Onno van Haren, accused him of the sexual assaults, and demanded he sign a 'promise' to leave his political post in exchange for their not making the accusations public. Onno van Haren initially agreed, however a year later he reneged and took up his political seat once more, upon which the signed 'promise' was produced and made public by his sons in law.

In yet another version, Elisabeth told her husband's family that she has been sexually assaulted by her father; Carolina, Elisabeth's elder sister, heard, and stated that their father had made a similar attempt to sexually assault her in the past. Both Carolina's and Elisabeth's in-laws then confronted Onno van Haren, who, after briefly attempting to deny the accusations, wrote and signed a confession in which he also promised to give up his political seat and depart to his estate. This document came into the possession of his political enemies, who used it to attempt to have him resign, upon which Onno van Haren published a work insisting on his innocence, and accusing his daughters and their in-laws of falsely maligning him. He claimed he had only signed the concession because Carolina's father's fiancé had threatened to cancel the engagement otherwise.

After a variety of accusations and counter-accusations, Onno van Haren finally left court, and began living on his estate as a famous writer.

Carolina Wilhelmina van Haren was disinherited and broke all contact with her family. She often attended the court of the House of Orange and became a known Orangist. When she separated from her spouse in 1773, she was given an allowance from the House of Orange.
