= Dirk van Haaren =

Dutch artist

- Born: 21 April 1878 April 21, 1878; Amsterdam, Netherlands
- Died: 30 June 1953 (aged 67); Amsterdam, Netherlands
- Known for: Painting

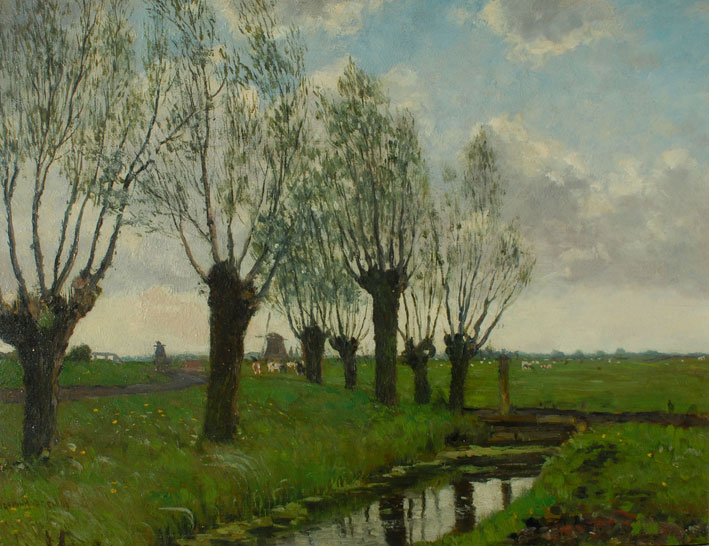
Landscape by Dirk van Haaren

Dirk Johannes van Haaren (April 21, 1878, Amsterdam– June 30, 1953, Amsterdam) was a Dutch painter.

Dirk Johannes van Haaren lived and worked in Amsterdam and in Sloten, North Holland. He was an autodidact and made watercolors as well as oil paintings. Is regarded as follower of the renowned Hague School. He painted mainly landscapes, often with water, windmills and cattle, views of the city of Amsterdam and, in his later phase, horses and riders.

He was a member of Arti et Amicitiae and the Guild of Saint Luke, both in Amsterdam. van Haaren's work was included in the 1939 exhibition and sale Onze Kunst van Heden (Our Art of Today) at the Rijksmuseum in Amsterdam.
