= John Henry Haaren =

American historian

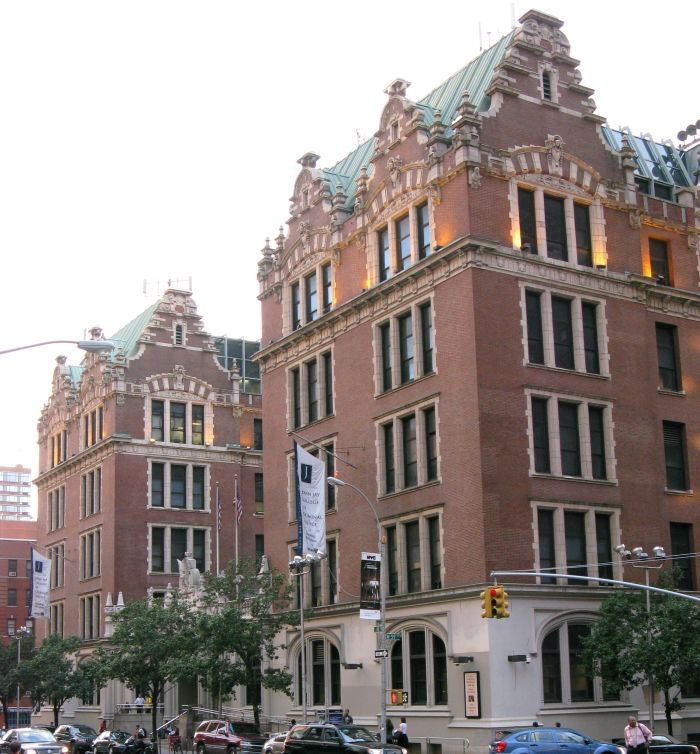
Haaren Hall in 2008

John Henry Haaren (born August 13, 1855, New York, New York – d. September 23, 1916, Brooklyn, New York) was an American educator and historian.

Haaren's father was German and his mother Irish and English. He studied under Prof. N. M. Butler at Columbia University, 1889–91, before becoming a teacher in New York. In 1907 he became Associate Superintendent of Schools in New York, increasing the number and efficiency of kindergartens and starting classes to teach English to foreigners.

He was president of the department of pedagogy in the Brooklyn Institute. Haaren High School (which was located on 10th Avenue between 58th and 59th Streets in Manhattan) was named in his honor. The Charles B. J. Snyder-designed school which was initially DeWitt Clinton High School is now Haaren Hall on the campus of the John Jay College of Criminal Justice

== Works ==
- Addison B. Poland (1904). Famous Men of Rome. University publishing company.
- Addison B. Poland (1904). Famous Men of the Middle Ages. University Publishing Company.
- Addison B. Poland (1904). Famous Men of Greece.
- Addison B. Poland (1909). Famous Men of Modern Times. American Book Co.
- Fairy Life: Third Reader Grade. 1896.
- Addison B. Poland (1914). First Notions of Geography.
