= Marijke van Haaren =

Dutch politician

Marijke van Haaren (born 10 February 1952, 't Zand, Zijpe) is a Dutch politician on behalf of the CDA.

Van Haaren was from 1994 to 1998 council member in Ede and from 1998 to 2002 in this town councilor. After she was in 2003 deputy in the province of Gelderland. In her first term she had the assignment infrastructure and public transport, and in her second term she is responsible for mobility and economy. Van Haaren has several functions related to other positions but is also the president of the Cyclists, chairman of the Dutch Association of Inland and member of the Readers Fund NRC Handelsblad. Before Van Haaren moved full-time into politics, she worked as a high school English teacher. Van Haaren is married and has two children.
