= Frederick Augustus I of Saxony =

Ruler of Saxony from 1763 to 1827

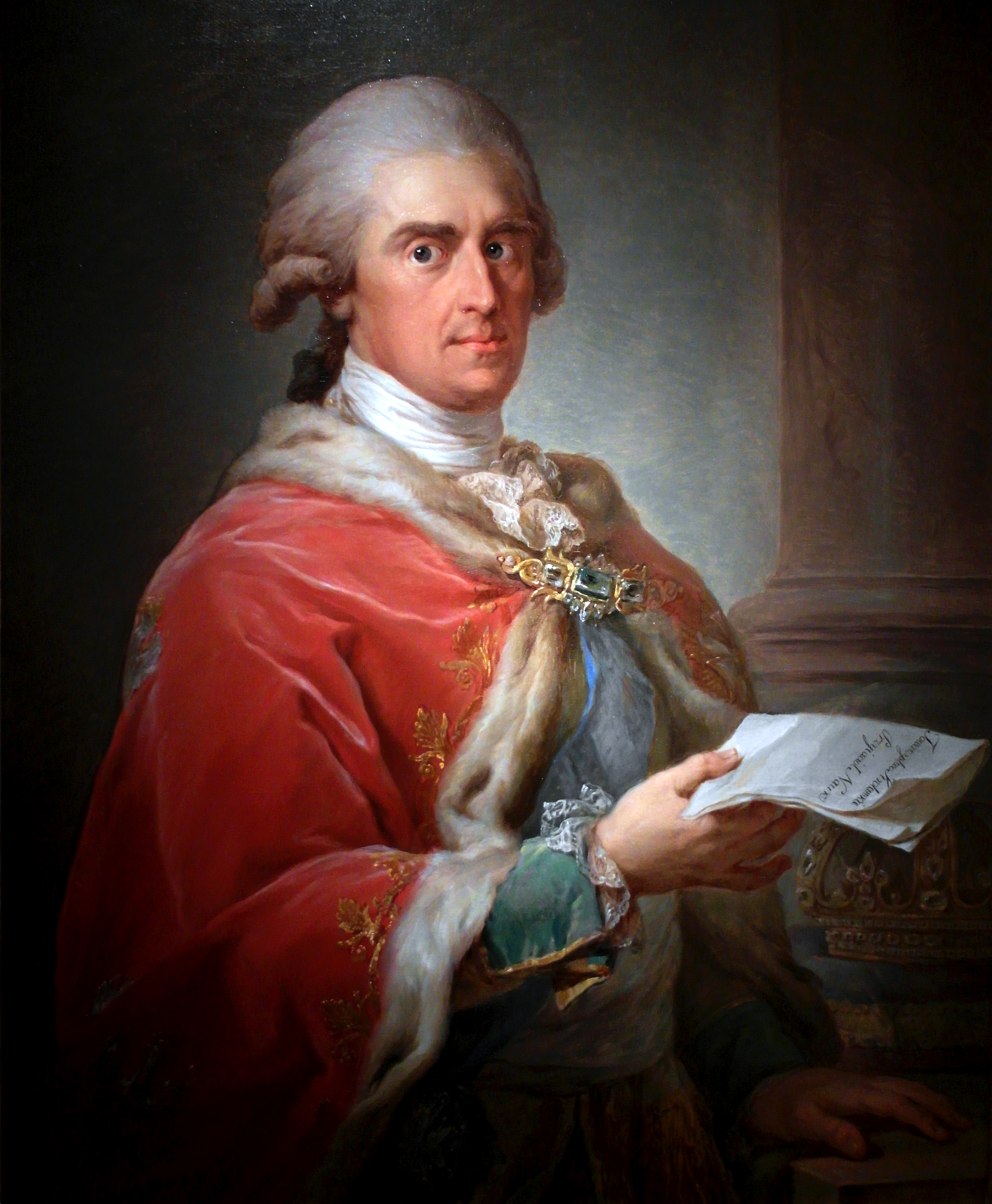
- Portrait by Marcello Bacciarelli, 1809

King of Saxony
- Reign: 20 December 1806 – 5 May 1827
- Coronation: 20 December 1806
- Successor: Anthony

Duke of Warsaw
- Reign: 9 July 1807 – 22 May 1815
- Predecessor: Stanisław August Poniatowski (as King of Poland)
- Successor: Alexander I of Russia (as King of Poland)

Elector of Saxony
- Reign: 17 December 1763 – 20 December 1806
- Predecessor: Frederick Christian
- Regent: Prince Francis Xavier of Saxony (1763–1768); Duchess Maria Antonia of Bavaria (1763–1768)

King of Poland (disputed)
- Reign: 28 June 1812 – 30 April 1813
- Predecessor: Stanisław August Poniatowski
- Successor: Alexander I of Russia

Grand Duke of Lithuania (disputed)
- Reign: 1 July 1812 – 30 April 1813
- Predecessor: Alexander I (as Emperor of Russia, titular ruler)
- Successor: Alexander I (as Emperor of Russia, titular ruler)
- Born: 23 December 1750; Dresden, Electorate of Saxony, Holy Roman Empire
- Died: 5 May 1827 (aged 76); Dresden, Kingdom of Saxony, German Confederation
- Burial: Dresden Cathedral, Dresden
- Spouse: Amalie of Zweibrücken-Birkenfeld (m. 1769)
- Issue: Princess Maria Augusta of Saxony
Names
- German: Friedrich August Joseph Maria Anton Johann Nepomuk Aloys Xaver; Polish: Fryderyk August Józef Maria Antoni Jan Nepomucen Alojzy Ksawery
- House: Wettin (Albertine line)
- Father: Frederick Christian, Elector of Saxony
- Mother: Duchess Maria Antonia of Bavaria
- Religion: Roman Catholicism

Frederick Augustus I of Saxony (German: Friedrich August I., Polish: Fryderyk August I, French: Frédéric-Auguste Ier, 23 December 1750 – 5 May 1827) was a member of the House of Wettin who reigned as the last Elector of Saxony from 1763 to 1806 (as Frederick Augustus III) and as the first King of Saxony from 1806 to 1827. He was also Duke of Warsaw from 1807 to 1815, a legitimate candidate to the Polish throne after the Constitution of 3 May 1791 (in 1812–1813 he was proclaimed, but unrecognized, King of Poland by the General Confederation of the Kingdom of Poland) and a short-lived disputed Grand Duke of Lithuania in 1812.

Throughout his political career, Frederick Augustus tried to rehabilitate and recreate the Polish state that was torn apart and ceased to exist after the final partition of Poland in 1795. However, he did not succeed, for which he blamed himself for the rest of his life. Nevertheless, his efforts at reestablishing an independent Polish nation did endear him to the Polish people.

The Augustusplatz in Leipzig is named after him.

== Elector of Saxony and King Designate of Poland ==
=== Family background ===
Frederick Augustus was the second (but eldest surviving) son of Frederick Christian, Elector of Saxony and Maria Antonia Walpurgis, Princess of Bavaria. Because he was underage at the time of his father's death of smallpox in 1763, his mother served as Regent until 1768. His uncle, Prince Francis Xavier, functioned as his representative. Through his father's side, he was descended from two kings of Poland, and through his mother's side Siemowit, the first confirmed Duke of Poland.

=== Renunciation of the Polish throne ===
Two of Frederick Augustus' predecessors as Elector of Saxony had been kings of Poland, but due to his young age, he was not considered eligible during the 1764 Polish–Lithuanian royal election. However, when the constitution was ratified by the Polish Sejm, Frederick Augustus was named successor to King Stanisław August Poniatowski. At the same time, the head of the Saxon Royal House was established as heir to the Polish throne through Article VII of that very constitution. Frederick Augustus declined to accept the crown upon Stanisław's death in 1798 because he feared becoming entangled in disputes with Austria, Prussia and Russia, which had begun to partition Poland in 1772. In fact, by then the title would have been in name only - a full partition of Poland among those neighboring powers had already taken place in 1795.

=== Foreign policy up to the dissolution of the Holy Roman Empire ===
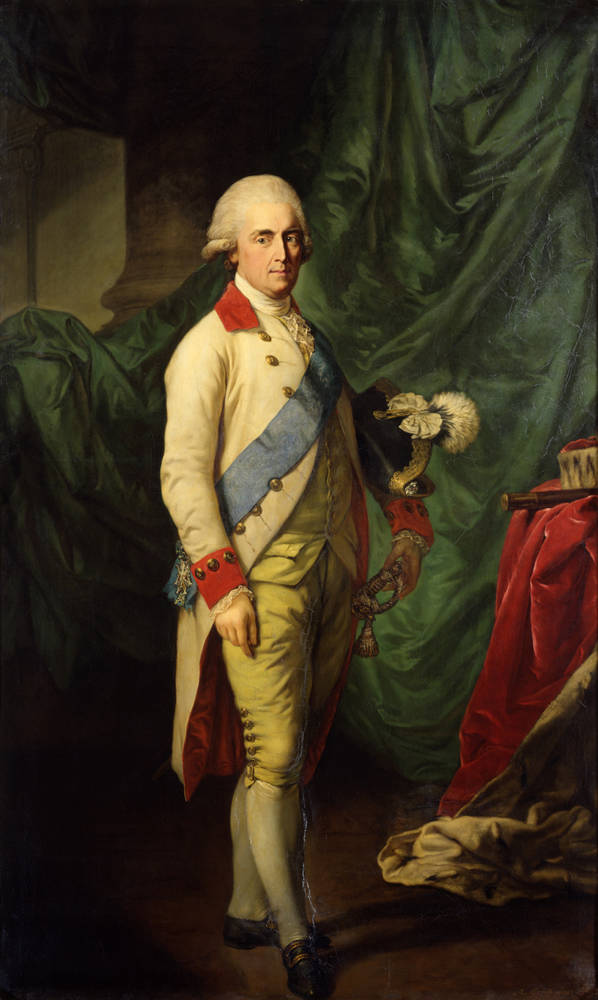
Portrait of Frederick Augustus by Anton Graff, 1795

In August 1791, Frederick Augustus arranged a meeting with Holy Roman Emperor Leopold II and King Frederick William II of Prussia at Pillnitz Castle. The move was intended partly to offer support for the French monarchy in the face of revolutionary agitation in France. The Declaration of Pillnitz warned of the possibility of military action against the French revolutionary government, a provocation that provided the latter with grounds to declare war on Austria in April 1792. Frederick Augustus himself did not sign the Declaration.

Saxony wanted nothing to do with the defensive alliance against France formed between Austria and Prussia. Nonetheless, a declaration of a Reichskrieg by the Reichstag of the Holy Roman Empire issued in March 1793, obliged Frederick Augustus to take part. There was great concern in Saxony in April 1795 when Prussia suddenly concluded a separate peace with France in order to facilitate the Third Partition of Poland. Saxony dropped out of the coalition against France in August 1796 after France had advanced east into the German lands and additional conditions for the Holy Roman Empire to conclude a separate peace were agreed.

Both the peace agreement with France and Saxony's participation in the Congress of Rastatt in 1797 served to demonstrate Frederick Augustus' loyalty to the conventional constitutional principles of the Holy Roman Empire. The Congress of Rastatt was supposed to authorize the surrender to France of the territories on the left bank of the Rhine in return for compensation for the rulers relinquishing territory. However, at Rastatt and again in 1803 at the issuance of the Final Report of the Empire Delegation, the law of the Holy Roman Empire that laid out the new order of the Empire, Saxony refused to agree to territorial adjustments, since these were designed to benefit Bavaria, Prussia, Württemberg, and Baden.

=== Foreign policy until the peace with Napoleon ===
Frederick Augustus also did not participate in the creation of the Confederation of the Rhine, which led to the final dissolution of the Holy Roman Empire. With respect to the Prussian idea of a North German empire, within which Saxony was supposed to be raised to a kingdom, he appeared reserved. However, after September 1806, in response to the Berlin Ultimatum, which demanded the withdrawal of French troops from the left bank of the Rhine, Napoleon advanced as far as Thuringia. At that point, Frederick Augustus joined with Prussia. However, at the twin battles of Jena and Auerstedt in 1806, Napoleon inflicted a crushing defeat on the Prusso–Saxon troops. The Prussian government and army then withdrew headlong to the east. Frederick Augustus, left without any information concerning Prussian intentions and with Napoleon's troops about to occupy Saxony, was forced to conclude peace. On 11 December 1806 in Poznań, a treaty was signed by authorised representatives of both sides. According to its terms, Saxony was forced to join the Confederation of the Rhine and to surrender parts of Thuringia to the recently organised Kingdom of Westphalia. As compensation, Saxony was given the area around Cottbus and was raised to the status of a kingdom alongside the Confederation states of Bavaria and Württemberg.

== King of Saxony and Grand Duke of Warsaw ==
=== Elevation to Saxon-Polish ruler ===
Coat of arms of Saxony and the Duchy of Warsaw

Frederick Augustus was proclaimed King of Saxony on 20 December 1806. After the Treaty of Tilsit, which Frederick William III of Prussia and Tsar Alexander I of Russia concluded with Napoleon in July 1807, Frederick Augustus was also named Grand Duke of Warsaw. Although he had rejected the offer of the throne of Poland in 1795 by the Sejm, he could not refuse a Polish title a second time.

Article V of the Constitution of the Duchy of Warsaw, which Napoleon dictated to Saxony, was linked to the Polish Constitution of 1791 and joined the Duchy of Warsaw hereditarily to the Royal House of Saxony. Geopolitically the Duchy of Warsaw comprised the areas of the 2nd and 3rd Prussian partitions (1795), with the exception of Danzig, which was made into the Free City of Danzig under joint French and Saxon "protection", and the district around Białystok, which was given to Russia. The area under Prussian control was made up of territory from the former Prussian provinces of New East Prussia, Southern Prussia, New Silesia, and West Prussia. In addition, the new state was given the area along the Noteć river and the "Land of Chełmno".

Altogether, the Duchy had an initial area of around 104,000 km2, with a population of approximately 2,600,000. The bulk of its inhabitants were Poles.

In 1809, Austria was successfully defeated by Polish–Saxon troops when it attempted to take possession of the Duchy and, for its part, had to cede to the Duchy of Warsaw Polish regions absorbed up to 1795, among them the old Polish royal city of Kraków. In July 1812, Frederick Augustus ratified a proclamation of the Sejm of the Duchy of Warsaw that restored the Kingdom of Poland. Napoleon lodged a protest against this action.

=== Events during the War of Liberation ===
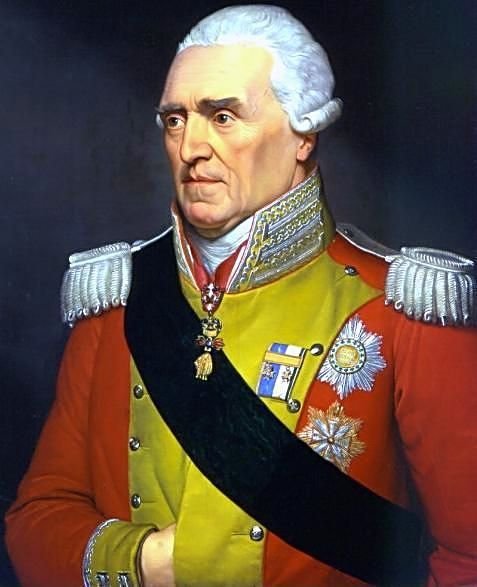
Portrait of Frederick Augustus by Carl Christian Vogel von Vogelstein, 1823

In 1813, during the German Campaign of 1813, Saxony found itself in a more difficult situation than many other warring states. The country was still solidly in Napoleon's grip and at the same time had become the central arena of the war. In the autumn of 1813, at the start of the Battle of Leipzig (Battle of Nations), the local population of Saxony, which tallied about 2 million, saw almost a million soldiers brought to its territories. Napoleon openly threatened to consider Saxony as enemy territory and treat it accordingly should Frederick Augustus change sides. Frederick Augustus' room for maneuver was consequently greatly limited. He did not want to put the country's well-being into play frivolously. At the same time, he still remembered vividly the way in which Prussia had simply abandoned him in 1806.

In this difficult situation, the King attempted to enter cautiously into an alliance with the Sixth Coalition in 1813 without risking a public break with Napoleon and a declaration of war. As the Prussian and Russian troops entered Saxony in the spring, the King first moved to the south in order to avoid a direct encounter and pursued an alliance with Austria secretly from Regensburg. The Saxon-Austrian Pact was concluded on 20 April and the King made the Prussian and Russian allies aware of it at the same time. Napoleon, from whom Frederick Augustus was not able to keep the diplomatic maneuvers concealed, summoned the King urgently to Saxony after he had defeated the Prusso-Russian troops at Lützen on 2 May. Frederick Augustus decided to comply with the ultimatum presented to him. With no prospect of concrete assistance from Austria, and in view of the defeat of the Prussian – Russian coalition, which now sent peace signals to France, he felt he had no choice.

Frederick Augustus' decision brought the country scarcely any relief. Napoleon, angered at the near defection of the King and at the same time dependent upon the full mobilization of all available forces against the Coalition troops, harshly demanded the full resources of Saxony. In addition, the country suffered under the changing fortunes of war and associated movements and quartering. At the end of August, the Allies failed again to defeat Napoleon at the Battle of Dresden. Meanwhile, Saxony became the principal arena of war and Dresden the midpoint of the French army movements. Not until 9 September in Teplitz did Austria conclude its alliance with Prussia and Russia. In September, as Napoleon's troops in Saxony formed up to retreat before the expanded Coalition, there came the first defections to the Allies within the Royal Saxon Army.

Frederick Augustus was mistrustful of Prussia in view of the experiences of the spring and arguably disappointed as well by Austria's decision not to join the Coalition immediately, especially while the country was exposed as before to French domination. Thus, he chose not to break with Napoleon. At the Battle of Leipzig [Battle of Nations], the Saxon as well as the Polish troops fought on the side of Napoleon. In view of the apparent defeat of the French, even larger Saxon troop formations went over to the Coalition during the battle, whereas the Polish troops were largely annihilated.

=== Settlement of Saxon affairs at the Congress of Vienna ===
At the deliberations of the Congress of Vienna in 1814 and 1815, Frederick Augustus' position was doomed by his country's difficult geographic position, the changing fortunes of war, a lack of assistance from Austria, and his own vacillations. The Prussian-Russian alliance had never had honorable intentions in bringing Saxony into the anti-Napoleon alliance in the first place. Even before Prussia declared war on France on 17 March 1813, it had agreed to an alliance with Russia to the detriment of Saxony and Poland in the Treaty of Kalisz on 22 February: the Duchy of Warsaw would predominantly come under Russian rule, whereas Prussia would be compensated for relinquished Polish territories with the annexation of Saxon territory. Prussia's appetite for the economically and culturally more developed territories of Saxony originated in the old dream of annexation that Frederick II had developed in his political testament of 1752 and had already tried to realise in the Seven Years' War. It did not originate from any necessity to overcome Napoleonic rule in central Europe.

After the Battle of Leipzig, the Prussian-Russian alliance showed no interest in an alliance with the Saxon king in the wider struggle against Napoleon, irrespective of offers of support from Frederick Augustus. Rather, the King was made captive and taken to Friedrichsfelde near Berlin and placed under Russian-Prussian custody in the name of a "General Government of High Allied Powers."

It was the forceful manner of Prussian minister Baron von Stein rather than the government administered by Russian Prince Nikolai Repnin-Volkonsky until November 1814 or the subsequent Prussian force of occupation (lasting to June 1815), which was responsible for the low morale in Saxony at the end of the Napoleonic Wars. In contrast to the representatives of France, Frederick Augustus was denied participation at the Congress of Vienna as punishment for his supposed role as the quasi-deputy of his former ally Napoleon. Certainly, this treatment of the Saxon king was owing to nothing other than the intention of Prussia and Russia to carry out the annexation plans agreed to in Kalisz. That Saxony was not completely abandoned can be attributed to the fear of Austria and France of an overly-strengthened Prussia. Because the Saxon question threatened to break up the Congress, the allies finally agreed to divide Saxony (7 January 1815) with the mediation of the Tsar.

=== Acceptance of the post-war order of the Congress of Vienna ===
After his release from a Prussian prison in February 1815, at first, Frederick Augustus delayed his agreement to the division of his country. However, having no other option, he finally gave in, and on 18 May consented to the peace treaty laid before him by Prussia and Russia. With the signing of the treaty on 21 May 1815, 57% of Saxon territory and 42% of the Saxon population were turned over to Prussia.

Places and areas that had been connected to the Saxon landscape for hundreds of years became completely foreign, absorbed in part into artificially created administrative regions. Examples include Wittenberg, the old capital of the Saxon Electoral State during the Holy Roman Empire, and seat of the National University made famous by Martin Luther and Melanchthon (which was already done away with in 1817 by means of a merger with the Prussian University of Halle), and Torgau, birthplace and place of residence of the Elector Frederick the Wise, which was incorporated into one of the new hybrids created by Prussia under the name Province of Saxony. Lower Lusatia, which, like Upper Lusatia, had preserved its constitutional autonomy under Saxon rule, was incorporated into the Province of Brandenburg and ceased to exist as a state. Upper Lusatia was arbitrarily divided: the area assigned to Prussia, including Görlitz, was added to the Province of Silesia; these areas also lost their constitutional autonomy.

On 22 May 1815, Frederick Augustus abdicated as ruler of the Duchy of Warsaw, whose territory was annexed mainly to Russia, but also partly to Prussia and Austria. In the area assigned to Russia, a Kingdom of Poland was created to join in a hereditary union with the Russian throne. The old royal city of Kraków no longer belonged to the new kingdom and became a separate republic. The internal autonomy that it enjoyed at first was abolished in 1831 after the Polish Uprising.

== King of Saxony ==
=== Standing among the Saxon people upon his return ===
When Frederick returned home to Saxony in July 1815, he was greeted enthusiastically throughout the land. Numerous expressions of loyalty also reached the king from the ceded territories, where the populace regarded the new rulers coolly; shortly thereafter, the notion of being "mandatory-Prussian" began to circulate. In Liège Province, where the majority of the regiments of the Saxon Army had been stationed since the beginning of 1815, there was a revolt at the end of April. At the behest of the Prussian king, Generalfeldmarschall Blücher was to discharge the soldiers who came from the annexed territories, but Frederick Augustus' men had not yet made their departure, and the Saxon soldiers rioted over it. Blücher had to flee the city and was able to put down the revolt only by calling up additional Prussian troops.

Public opinion in Saxony lay decisively on Frederick Augustus' side at the time of his return. There was a feeling that Prussian policies were too ruthless both against the country and the king. The avarice of special interests in Berlin came across all too clearly as the rewards of the War of Liberation were distributed.

=== Final years ===
The last twelve years of Frederick Augustus' government passed for the most part quietly. The king's conservative character, which in foreign policy up to 1806 had manifested itself in unconditional loyalty to Saxon interests, hardened even more after the experience of Napoleonic hegemony. With respect to political reform, the King achieved little. Until his death in 1827, which fell on the anniversary of Napoleon's death, little was altered in the constitutional configuration of the Saxon state. Undoubtedly, the king avoided making such a move out of respect for the rights of the remaining Lusatian upper classes. Just as little came of the desire of many people to transform the existing political system to accommodate a genuine legislature. There was scarcely any lessening of admiration for the old king who had overseen the destiny of Saxony for more than half a century. During his lifetime, he gained the epithet "The Just". Resentment over the delayed economic and social rebuilding of the country was to be felt by his brother, King Anthony.

Frederick Augustus was entombed in the Roman Catholic Cathedral of Dresden.

== Marriage and issue ==
In Mannheim on 17 January 1769 (by proxy) and again in Dresden on 29 January 1769 (in person), Frederick Augustus married the Countess Palatine (Pfalzgräfin) Amalie of Zweibrücken-Birkenfeld, sister of King Maximilian I Joseph of Bavaria. During their marriage, Amalia gave birth to four children, but only one daughter survived to adulthood:

1. Stillborn child (1771);
2. Stillborn child (1775);
3. Princess Maria Augusta of Saxony (21 June 1782, Dresden – 14 March 1863, Dresden);
4. Stillborn child (1797).

Frederick Augustus had an illegitimate daughter, born out of an affair with the daughter of a Jewish court financier in Dresden.

Without surviving male issue, Frederick Augustus was succeeded as King of Saxony by his younger brother Anthony.

== Ancestors ==
Ancestors of Frederick Augustus I of Saxony

8. Augustus II the Strong
4. Augustus III of Poland
9. Christiane Eberhardine of Brandenburg-Bayreuth
2. Frederick Christian, Elector of Saxony
10. Joseph I, Holy Roman Emperor
5. Maria Josepha of Austria
11. Wilhelmine Amalie of Brunswick-Lüneburg
1. Frederick Augustus I of Saxony
12. Maximilian II Emanuel
6. Charles VII, Holy Roman Emperor
13. Theresa Kunegunda Sobieska
3. Duchess Maria Antonia of Bavaria
14. Joseph I, Holy Roman Emperor (= 10)
7. Maria Amalia, Holy Roman Empress
15. Wilhelmine Amalie of Brunswick-Lüneburg (= 11)

== See also ==
- Order of the Rue Crown
- History of Saxony
- Rulers of Saxony
- Dresden Castle – Residence of Frederick Augustus I

== Notes and references ==
Preceded by Frederick Christian	Elector of Saxony; 1763 – 1806	Succeeded by Electorate abolished
Preceded by Kingdom created	King of Saxony; 1806 – 1827	Succeeded by Anthony of Saxony
