= Communist Party of Lithuania and Byelorussia =

- Chairperson: Vincas Mickevičius-Kapsukas
- Secretary: Vilhelm Knorin
- Governing body: Central Committee
- Founded: July 19, 1918
- Dissolved: September 5, 1920
- Preceded by: Social Democratic Party of Lithuania and Belorussia
- Succeeded by: Communist Party of Lithuania, Communist Party (Bolsheviks) of Belorussia
- Headquarters: Vilna, Bobruisk, Minsk, Smolensk
- Youth wing: Young Communist League of Lithuania and Belorussia
- Membership (1919): 17,636
- Ideology: Communism
- Regional affiliation: Russian Communist Party (Bolsheviks)
- International affiliation: Communist International

Party flag

The Communist Party of Lithuania and Byelorussia (Note: Belarusian: Камуністычная партыя Літвы і Беларусі, abbreviated КП ЛіБ, Lithuanian: Lietuvos ir Baltarusijos Komunistų partiją, abbreviated LBKP, Russian: Коммунистическая партия Литвы и Белоруссии, abbreviated КПЛиБ, Polish: Komunistyczna Partia Litwy i Białorusi, abbreviated KPLiB, Yiddish: קאָמוניסטישער פארטיי אין ליטע און ווייסרוסלאַנד) also known as the Communist Party (Bolsheviks) of Lithuania and Byelorussia, was a communist party which governed the short-lived Socialist Soviet Republic of Lithuania and Byelorussia (SSR LiB) in 1919. The Central Committee of the party had the status of a regional committee within the Russian Communist Party (Bolsheviks). Following the loss of Lithuania and Byelorussia to Polish forces in the Polish-Soviet war, the party organized partisan units behind the front lines. In September 1920 the party was disbanded into the Communist Party of Lithuania and the Communist Party (Bolsheviks) of Byelorussia.

== History ==
=== Foundation ===
Vincas Mickevičius-Kapsukas

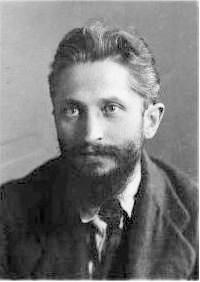
Zigmas Angarietis

The formation of the Communist Party of Lithuania and Byelorussia was preceded in the spring of 1918 by the formation of the Social Democratic Party of Lithuania and Byelorussia — an organization that gathered the revolutionary majority faction of the Vilna branch of the Social Democratic Party of Lithuania (who had broken away from their mother party in protest over the participation of LSDP leaders in the Council of Lithuania), the small communist group formed around Aleksandra Drabavičiūtė (Ona) who arrived in April 1918 of a first emissary of the Central Bureau of the Lithuanian Sections of the Russian Communist Party (Bolsheviks) to Lithuania and the Vilna unit of the Russian Social Democratic Labour Party (Mensheviks) (led by Ginsburg-Girinis). Debates ranged between the different factions over party programme and national question. In the end, the discussions with the Mensheviks broke down.

The party that gathered the communist platform was formed in Vilna on July 19, 1918 as the Social Democratic Labour Party of Lithuania and Byelorussia, gathering the revolutionary wing of the Social Democratic Party of Lithuania and Byelorussia, some other former members of the Lithuanian Social Democratic Party and individual pro-communist groupings. Leaders of the Social Democratic Labour Party of Lithuania and Byelorussia included Pranas Eidukevičius and Konstantin Kernovich.

Meanwhile in Soviet Russia, there was no separate Lithuanian national organization within the Bolshevik Party (unlike the case for Latvian and Polish socialists). Lithuanian Bolsheviks joined the All-Russian party as individuals, albeit Lithuanian sections and cells were formed within the Bolshevik Party. In the fall of 1917 a Central Bureau of the Lithuanian Sections of the Bolshevik Party was formed. At the two conferences of the Lithuanian Sections (January 18–21, 1918 and May 26–27, 1918, respectively) the two main leaders of Lithuanian Bolsheviks (Vincas Mickevičius-Kapsukas and Zigmas Angarietis) clashed over approach to party-building. Angarietis called for the formation of an independent Lithuanian communist party, whilst Mickevičius-Kapsukas favoured working within existing workers parties in Lithuania. Angarietis' position prevailed, as the publication of an excerpt of Angarietis' line was published in the August 15, 1918 issue of the Moscow newspaper Izvestia - indicating that he had the backing of the Russian Communist Party (Bolsheviks) on the matter.

At a meeting in Vilna on August 14, 1918, attended by the representatives of the Central Committee, representatives of the Vilna Committee of the party, one delegate from the provinces and the party decided to change its name to 'Communist Party of Lithuania and Byelorussia', in understanding with the Central Bureau of the Lithuanian Sections of the Russian Communist Party (Bolsheviks). The name included 'Byelorussia' as it had organizations in Byelorussian areas adjacent to Vilna. However, the linkage with Byelorussia was often omitted in Lithuanian language propaganda. The name implicitly provoked some confusion, as a separate Communist Party (Bolsheviks) of Byelorussia was founded in 1918. There was a degree of tension between Lithuanian and Byelorussian communists over territorial questions, causing concern for the Russian communist leadership in Moscow.

The Communist Party of Lithuania and Byelorussia was active in organizing the labour movement in Vilna, building international trade unions. Between September 2, 1918 and October 1, 1918, twenty trade union gatherings took place. The Vilna Committee of the party, with Mickevičius-Kapsukas being the main instigator, also organized the launch of a legal workers press. The Central Bureau of Vilna Workers Class Trade Unions, the labour movement linked to the party, published Undzer lebn ('Our Life') in Yiddish, Pochodnia ('Torch') in Polish and Volna ('Wave') in Russian. The Central Bureau of Vilna Workers Class Trade Unions had also applied for a permit to publish the newspaper Vilnis in Lithuanian language.

=== Užbaliai Conference (September 1918) ===
A conference of Lithuanian communists was held in Užbaliai on September 15, 1918, which would connect a number of communist groups around Lithuania with the party. The conference was organized by the communist cells in Panevėžys and Suwałki. Reportedly, the conference had 14 delegates and 6 invitees - participants came from Panevėžys, Kupiškis, Subačius, Gelazii, Šeduva, Marijampolė, Pilviškiai, Gižai, Gelgaudiškis, Lukšiai, Višakio Rūda, Užbaliai, Baltrušiai and Šacki. Participants included Mickevičius-Kapsukas, Andrius Brazdžionis, Pranas Aitmanas, P. Pajuodis, P. Kazlaučiūnas, S. Kirvelaitis, P. Lingys, Vincas Grybas, J. Bartuška, P. Bepirštis-Daumantas, J. Janušauskas, J. Voveraitis, J. Lietuvaitis, J. Zonelis, J. Gabrys and J. Galeckas. From Vilna, J. Glovackis had arrived, who briefed the gathering about the formation of the Provisional Central Bureau of the Communist Party of Lithuania and Byelorussia as the new party centre. The Užbaliai conference endorsed the political line of the Russian Communist Party (Bolsheviks), seeking to adapt it to local conditions. The conference condemned the Council of Lithuania as a 'tool of German imperialism'. The Užbaliai meeting would later be conceptualized as the first party conference of the Communist Party of Lithuania.

=== First Party Congress (October 1918) ===
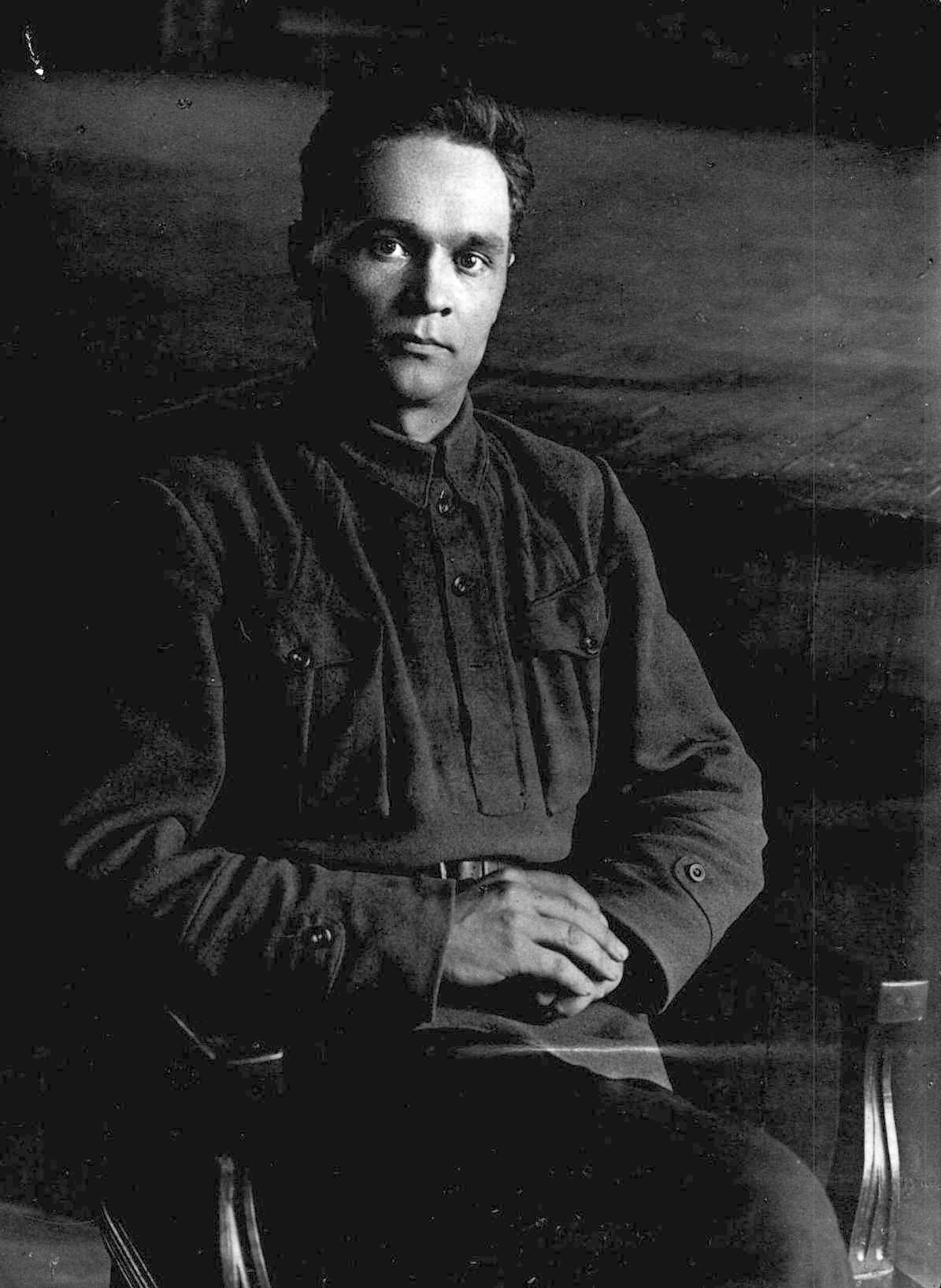
Konstantin Kernovich, the party treasurer

The First Congress of the Communist Party of Lithuania and Byelorussia (old occupation) was held in secrecy at Vilna on October 1–3, 1918. The event was hastily organized, with just some eight days of preparation. 34 delegates attended. At the time the party had some 800 members. The congress delegates represented 33 groups with 470 members from Kovno Governorate, 16 groups with 200 members from Vilna and surroundings, 10 groups with 95 members from Suwałki Governorate as well as a few small scattered groups from other areas.

The Vilna/Naujoji Vilnia delegation consisted of P. Eidukevičius, R. Pilar, K. Kernovich, J. Lickevičius and Radavičius. The Kovno/Kaišiadorys/Ukmergės delegation consisted of Pr. Naruševičius, J. Mickevičius, A. Jakševičius and P. Meilus. The Šiauliai/Joniškėlis delegation consisted of Juozas Dumša, S. Grybas and Karolis Požela. The Panevėžys/Šeduva/Rokiškis delegation consisted of A. Brazdžionis, P. Zėkas and Antanas Liaudanskas. The Samogitia delegation consisted of A. Mikakus, A. Šeputa, K. Juodka, A. Vitalis, M. Mačernis and S. Juzumaitė - the latter two being students. The Suwalki (Vilkaviškis/Marijampolė/Naumieści) delegation consisted of Mickevičius-Kapsukas, J. Zonelis, J. Lietuvaitis, J. Glovackis, P. Lingys, V. Skrinska, J. Krašauskas, A. Ramanauskas, P. Botyrius, Strimaitis and Klimavičius.

Most of the delegates were workers, poor peasants, intelligentsia and primary school teachers. The congress endorsed the decisions of the August 14, 1918 and September 15, 1918 meetings.

The congress elected a Central Committee consisting of Andrius Brazdžionis, Pranas Eidukevičius, Simanas Grybas, Aleksandras Jakševičius, Konstantin Kernovich, Jonas Lietuvaitis and Roman Pilar. The Central Committee elected a Presidium, consisting of Eidukevičius (chairman), Pilar (secretary), and Kernovich (treasurer). The congress elected a 21-member delegation to the 8th Congress of the Russian Communist Party (Bolsheviks), authorizing the delegation to make a statement at the congress on the draft program of the RCP(B).

The first session of the congress took place in the house of Olga Smirnova, a communist sympathizer. The second session took place in Kernovich's apartment. The third session took place at a house on Subačiaus street.

=== Establishment of Soviet Lithuania (December 1918) ===
As of early December 1918 the Central Committee of the party issued German language leaflets distribute to German soldiers, calling on unity between soldiers and workers. In the December 1918 elections to the Vilna Soviet of Workers Deputies the communists had won 97 seats, the General Jewish Labour Bund 60, Menshevik-Internationalists 22, Lithuanian Social Democratic Party 15. On December 8, 1918 the Central Committee of the Communist Party of Lithuania and Byelorussia proclaimed the Provisional Revolutionary Workers and Peasants Government of Lithuania, which was formally installed in Vilna on December 16, 1918. Mickevičius-Kapsukas and Angarietis arrived from Moscow, carrying instructions from the RCP(B) party centre (seeking to contain potential moves by Lithuanian communists to declare independence from Soviet Russia) and were hastily inducted into the Central Committee of the Communist Party of Lithuania and Byelorussia. Other new members of the expanded Central Committee were Kazimierz Cichowski, Semyon Dimanstein and Yitzhak Vaynstayn. The Provisional Revolutionary Workers' and Peasants' Government of Lithuania, headed by Mickevičius-Kapsukas and Angarietis, was placed under the leadership of the party Central Committee, rather than the Vilna soviet.

By late 1918 the Vilna Workers Club on 9, Varnų Street (present-day A. Jakšto Street) hosted the party headquarters.

=== Second Party Conference (February 1919) ===
The party held its second conference February 2–4, 1919. The conference, held in the midst of war communism, decided to oppose the splitting of large agricultural estates. The dominant opinion in the party saw the large estates as a key resource, which would produce significant agricultural output being placed under state management. Lenin differed with this view, at least in terms of tactics, but would give his blessings for applying this policy in SSR LiB as a specific case. The majority of these estates in the SSR LiB were converted into state-run or collective farms.

=== Merger Congress (March 1919) ===
On February 27, 1919 the Lithuanian and Byelorussian soviet republics merged, creating the Socialist Soviet Republic of Lithuania and Byelorussia (commonly known as 'Litbel'). The merger of the communist parties of the two republics soon followed. At the second party congress, held in Vilna March 4–6, 1919, the Communist Party of Byelorussia merged with the party. The party retained the name Communist Party of Lithuania and Byelorussia after the merger, and remained a regional unit of the Russian Communist Party (Bolsheviks). The united party counted 17,636 members at the time of the merger. A 15-member Central Committee was elected, consisting of Angarietis, Mickevičius-Kapsukas, Waclaw Bogucki, Kazimierz Cichowski, Semyon Dimanstein, Yakov Doletsky-Feingstein, Semyon Ivanov, Viktor Yarkin, Moses Kalmanovich, Vilhelm Knorin, Alexander Miasnikian, Grigory Naidenkov, Roman Pilar, Isaac Reingold and Józef Unszlicht. The Central Committee had 8 candidate members - Aleksandra Drabavičiūtė, Karl Rozental, Julian Leszczyński, Juozas Dumša, Adolf Getner, Jānis Perno, N. Sverdlov and Goncharov.

V. Mickevicius-Kapsukas was elected Chairman of the Presidium of the Central Committee, whilst V. Knorin was elected Secretary of the Presidium. Doletsky-Feingstein, another member of the Central Committee Presidium, represented the Central Executive Committee of the Communist Workers Party of Poland in the Central Committee of the Communist Party of Lithuania and Byelorussia.

Kazys Giedrys, who served as the accredited representative of the Soviet Lithuanian government to Soviet Russia, represented the party as a delegate with voting rights at the founding congress of the Communist International - held in Moscow March 2–6, 1919.

=== Evacuation of the Central Committee ===
On April 11, 1919, the party Central Committee issued a letter to the Jewish socialist parties, addressed to the Central Committees of the General Jewish Labour Bund, the Poalei Zion and the United Jewish Socialist Workers Party, alerting on the risk of a Polish invasion and calling for mobilization of resistance. In particular, the party Central Committee called on the Jewish socialist parties to join manifestation on Red Army day.

On August 8, 1919 Minsk was seized by Polish forces, whereby the Central Committee of the Communist Party of Lithuania and Byelorussia shifted to Bobruisk, and then to Smolensk. In Smolensk, the Central Committee had its own publishing house.

=== Underground Bureau ===
On September 3, 1919 the Bureau for Underground Work (Lithuanian: Nelegalaus darbo biuras, abbreviated 'NDB', Belarusian: Бюро па нелегальнай рабоце, abbreviated 'BNR') was set-up by the Central Committee of the Communist Party of Lithuania and Byelorussia - which would direct clandestine party organizations and partisan movements in the areas controlled by Polish forces and would send communist organizers across the front lines. Mickevičius-Kapsukas was the chairman of the Bureau, with the other members being Knorin, Angarietis and Bogucki. The Bureau for Underground Work was guided by the Central Committee of the Russian Communist Party (Bolsheviks), the Central Committee of the Communist Party of Lithuania and Byelorussia and, for matters relating to Poland, the Central Executive Committee of the Communist Workers Party of Poland.

The Bureau for Underground Work set up a network to smuggle revolutionary literature, through which the works of V. I. Lenin, propaganda leaflets and party press (such as Pravda, Zvezda, Savieckaja Bielaruś, Młot, Komunistas, Komunista, Zhizn natsionalnosti) were distributed. Transportation points for the smuggling route were established in Krupki, Mozyr, Polotsk, Rogachev and Rēzekne. Secret warehouses were set up in Bobruisk and Dvinsk. Propaganda material were sent from Dvinsk and Rezhitsa to Lithuania, from Polotsk to Vilna, from Rogachev to Bobruisk and Minsk, from Krupki to Borisov, Vilna, Igumen, Minsk and from Mozyr to Brest-Litovsk, Grodno, Minsk, Slutsk.

The party set up clandestine bureaus in Vilna and Kovno. The Kovno Bureau played a key role in reviving the a clandestine communist printing activity inside Lithuania. Kazys Giedrys was placed in charge of the underground Regional Bureau of the party in Vilna.

By 1919 the communists ran a clandestine printing house in the city. In October 1919 the Central Committee directed the Minsk Subcommittee to act as a regional party centre, in order to supervise the work of the Borisov, Grodno, Igumen, Molodechno, Nesvizh and Slutsk party subcommittees. In November 1919 the Minsk Subcommittee organized a strike movement at work-places, to protest the Polish occupation. The Polish authorities responded by declaring trade unions in Minsk dissolved in December 1919.

But the communists regrouped, and by January 1920 new trade union organizations had been formed in Minsk, claiming a membership of around 4,000 workers. In the same month, the Central Committee instructed the party organization in Minsk to mobilize for armed struggle. The Minsk Raion Uprising Organization was set-up under the leadership of Vasily Sharangovich, who had been sent to Minsk in December 1920 by the Central Committee (he was later arrested by the Polish authorities, and sentenced to death). Units of armed partisans began operations in the outskirts of the city. The Polish forces moved its 17th Infantry Regiment away from the front, in order to combat the partisans. The Brest Underground Committee of the party led the partisan units in south-western Byelorussia.

The party led an insurrection at the Kovno garrison February 21–23, 1920. The party re-organized trade unions inside Lithuania. On April 4, 1920 a conference of communist organizations in Lithuania was held in Kovno. Giedrys, who had led the underground Vilna Bureau of the party, was arrested by Polish authorities in June 1920.

In the struggle against Polish forces, the party managed to build an alliance with the Vsevolod Ignatovsky's Byelorussian Communist Organization (BKO). Further expanding its alliances, on April 29, 1920, upon the instruction of RCP(B), the Minsk Subcommittee of the Communist Party of Lithuania and Byelorussia (led by M. Dzembo and others) joined the Byelorussian Uprising Committee that had been formed in early 1920 by the Belorussian Party of Social Revolutionaries (BPSR). The BPSR led peasant squads in the country-side around Minsk, areas where the BPSR was a significantly larger political organization than the Communist Party of Lithuania and Byelorussia. During the summer of 1920 armed struggle intensified with acts of sabotage against communication lines, warehouses and garrisons.

=== Liquidation of the party (July–September 1920) ===
On July 11, 1920, the Red Army seized Minsk. With the retaking of the city, the Minsk Governorate Party Committee would function in the city. The Soviet–Lithuanian Peace Treaty was concluded on July 12, 1920.

As Byelorussian territories came under Red Army control, debate on the national question re-emergence in the party. A section of the Central Committee of the Communist Party of Lithuania and Byelorussia (Knorin, Pikel, Reingold, Kalmanovich and others) revived a proposal to integrate the Minsk Governorate into Soviet Russia, within a frame of Byelorussian national-cultural autonomy. This proposition failed to win support in the Central Committee of the Russian Communist Party (Bolsheviks). As the merger with RSFSR being rejected, the Central Committee of the Communist Party of Lithuania and Byelorussia decided on July 6, 1920 to begin preparing to re-establish a Byelorussian soviet republic within the Minsk Governorate. But this move met with opposition within the party leadership, on July 12, 1920 Reingold and Pikel issued a statement titled 'On the question of the creation of the Byelorussian Soviet Republic' which rejected creating a Byelorussian national republic and again voiced desire for integration of Byelorussia into Soviet Russia. The Orgburo of the Russian Communist Party (bolsheviks) began preparing for the establishment of separate parties for Lithuania and Byelorussia.

On July 30, 1920 the party (represented by Knorin, Iosif Adamovich and Alexander Chervyakov) along with Vsevolod Ignatovsky of BKO and the General Jewish Labour Bund led by Arn Vaynshteyn, held a meeting which decided to reestablish a Byelorussian soviet republic. The Byelorussian Military Revolutionary Committee, which was to act as an emergency temporary authority in the Byelorussian areas under Soviet control, was formed - consisting of Knorin, Adamovich, Chervyakov, I. Klishevsky from the Communist Party of Lithuania and Byelorussia, as well as Ignatovsky and Vaynshteyn. On July 31, 1920 a meeting was held, organized by the Minsk Governorate Party Committee and the Military Revolutionary Committee, at which the creation of the Byelorussian Socialist Soviet Republic was announced at a ceremony in Minsk. The Declaration of Independence of the Soviet Socialist Republic of Belarus was signed by the Central Committee of the Communist Party of Lithuania and Byelorussia (Ivar Smilga, Knorin, Chervyakov), the Central Committee of the General Jewish Labour Bund (Vaynshteyn), Central Committee of BKO (Ignatovsky) and the Central Bureau of Trade Unions of Minsk City and Minsk Raion (A. M. Krinitsky).

Following the establishment of the Byelorussian soviet republic, the BKO merged into the Communist Party of Lithuania and Byelorussia. On the other hand, the alliance with the BPSR broke apart, as the Byelorussian SRs didn't sign the proclamation of the Byelorussian soviet republic due to differences on territorial question and instead demanded a Byelorussian constituent assembly.

On September 5, 1920 a plenary session of the Central Committee of the Communist Party of Lithuania and Byelorussia decided to split the party into two - the Communist Party of Lithuania and the Communist Party (Bolshevik) of Byelorussia. The September 5, 1920 meeting charged the reorganized Central Bureau in Lithuania to lead the party there until a party congress could be held.

== Press organs ==
=== Belarusian ===
Savieckaja Bielaruś ('Soviet Byelorussia') began publishing in February 1920 in Smolensk as the Belarusian language organ of the Central Committee of the party. On 15 August 1920 Savieckaja Bielaruś began to be printed in Minsk.

=== Lithuanian ===
Komunistas ('Communist') was the Lithuanian language organ of the Central Committee. During the Smolensk period of the Central Committee, it was published from there.

=== Polish ===
Komunista ('Communist') was a Polish-language organ of the Central Committee, published from Vilna 1918-1919. Komunista continued to be published from Smolensk as a Central Committee organ.

On February 23, 1919 the Polish-language newspaper Młot ('Hammer') became a joint organ of the Central Executive Committee of the Communist Workers Party of Poland and the Central Committee of the Communist Party of Lithuania and Byelorussia. The editorial team of Młot included Kazimierz Cichowski, Julian Leszczyński, Jakub Zbiniewicz and B. Wąsowski.

Moreover, the Central Committee of the party published the weekly Głos Robotnicz ('Workers Voice') from Vilna February–April 1919.

=== Russian ===
Zvezda ('Star') was the Russian language organ of the Central Committee. It was published from Smolensk during the period the Central Committee was based there.

=== Yiddish ===
Der Komunist ('The Communist') was a daily newspaper published from Vilna between December 26, 1918 and April 3, 1919. It was an organ of the party Central Committee. At the time, the editor was Moshe Lunevsky. Semyon Dimanstein was one of the contributors to the newspaper. Der Komunist fell out of favour with the Central Committee, who resolved to merge it with Der shtern ('The Star', a Minsk-based newspaper, whose editorial board was shifted to Vilna). The last issue of Der Komunist, published on April 3, 1919, declared that Der shtern was the new Central Committee organ. Der shtern continued to be the Yiddish organ of the Central Committee during the period the party leadership was based in Smolensk.

The Central Committee resumed the publication of a Yiddish daily, Di royte fon ('The Red Banner'), published in Vilna between August 1, 1920, and August 24, 1920.

== See also ==
- Kaunas Soviet of Workers Deputies
