= Central Bureau of the Lithuanian Sections of the Russian Communist Party (Bolsheviks) =

Lithuanian Bolshevik organization in Soviet Russia

The Central Bureau of the Lithuanian Sections of the Russian Communist Party (Bolsheviks) (Lithuanian: RKP(b) Lietuvių sekcijų Centro Biuras) was an organization within the Russian Communist Party (Bolsheviks) (Note: The Russian Communist Party (Bolsheviks) was known as "Russian Social Democratic Labour Party (Bolsheviks)" until March 1918.) that coordinated groups of Lithuanian party members across Soviet Russia in 1917–1921. The Central Bureau played a key role in the formation of the communist movement in Lithuania in the lead-up to the establishment of the first Lithuanian Soviet Republic in 1918, as there was no communist movement there at the time of the October Revolution. The main leaders of the Central Bureau of the Lithuanian Sections were Vincas Mickevičius-Kapsukas and Zigmas Aleksa-Angarietis, the founding duo of Lithuanian Bolshevism. Five conferences of Lithuanian Bolsheviks in Soviet Russia were held between 1918 and 1921. The Central Bureau of the Lithuanian Sections functioned under the Central Committee of the Russian Communist Party (Bolsheviks).

== Background ==
During World War I, some 300,000 to 400,000 inhabitants of the Lithuanian governorates were evacuated along with the retreating Imperial Russian Army to other parts of the Russian Empire. From 1916 to 1917, some Bolshevik organizations were formed among the Lithuanian evacuees in cities like Petrograd, Moscow, Kharkov and Voronezh. The Lithuanian District of the Petrograd Branch of the Bolshevik Party was founded on November 21, 1916. After the 1917 February Revolution, the Lithuanian Bolshevik organizations began operating legally, at the time having some 150 members. On April 12, 1917, Tiesa ('Truth'), the first Lithuanian-language Bolshevik publication, was launched as the organ of the Lithuanian District of the Petrograd Branch. By mid-1917, some 2,000 Lithuanians had joined the Bolshevik Party.

== Provisional Central Bureau ==
Vincas Mickevičius-Kapsukas

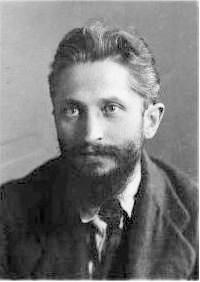
Zigmas Aleksa-Angarietis

A meeting of the Lithuanian District of the Petrograd Branch was held on September 10, 1917. It decided to disband the Lithuanian District and instructed its members to join the Bolshevik Party work-place cells. The meeting also resolved that Lithuanian Sections be formed within the Bolshevik Party organizations, specifically for agitation and propaganda activities among the Lithuanians in Russia. Thus Lithuanian Bolsheviks would be active both in the territorial party organizations as well as Lithuanian Sections. To coordinate the activities of the Lithuanian Sections, a Provisional Central Bureau was established chaired by Vincas Kapsukas. The Provisional Central Bureau also included Zigmas Angarietis and Juozas Dumša as its members. On October 10 (23), 1917, the Bolshevik Party Central Committee confirmed the composition of the Provisional Central Bureau of the Lithuanian Sections of the party. The formation of the Provisional Central Bureau was announced in the 25th issue of Tiesa (October 14 (27), 1917), which became an organ of the Provisional Central Bureau of the Lithuanian Sections and the Lithuanian Section of the Petrograd Branch.

Political activities were conducted among Lithuanian workers, which provoked splits along Bolshevik/Menshevik lines in the existing Lithuanian socialist groups. Periodicals of the Lithuanian Sections would appear in Moscow, Kharkov, Odessa and other cities. In particular, the Central Bureau was active in propaganda work among soldiers in national military units. Many books and pamphlets were translated into Lithuanian language. During the Second All-Russian Congress of Soviets of Workers' and Soldiers' Deputies held in November 1917, the Provisional Central Bureau was represented by Kapsukas, Norbertas Kavaliukas, Jonas Kovalskis, Viktoras Penkaitis, Eugenija Tautkaitė, and Elena Petniūnaitė-Vilūnienė.

== Lithuanian Affairs Commissariat ==
In November 1917, the Council of People's Commissars decided to establish the Commissariat for the Lithuanian Affairs under the People's Commissariat of Nationalities. The Central Bureau of the Lithuanian Sections managed the Commissariat for the Lithuanian Affairs, an institution that dealt with the needs of the evacuated Lithuanian workers, running schools and orphanages, and would eventually organize the return of evacuees back to Lithuania.

== First and Second Conferences ==
On January 5–8 (18-21), 1917, the first All-Russian Conference of Lithuanian Bolsheviks was held in Petrograd. The conference was attended by 36 delegates with voting rights, representing 2,400 party members from the Lithuanian Sections in Petrograd, Yekaterinoslav, Tula, Nizhny Novgorod, Kronstadt, Kharkov, Moscow, Reval as well as Lithuanian Bolsheviks from the 44th Division of the Northern Front and sailors from Vyborg. Representatives from the Smolensk branch of the Lithuanian Social Democratic Party were invited, as they adhered to the Tiesa line. Lithuanian Bolsheviks from Omsk, Irkutsk, Bogorodsky, Odessa and other cities were unable to attend.

A permanent institution for the Lithuanian Bolsheviks – the Central Bureau of the Lithuanian Sections of the Russian Social Democratic Labour Party (Bolsheviks) – was elected at the conference. The Central Bureau was subordinated to the Bolshevik Party Central Committee.

In April 1918, the theoretical publication Komunistas ('Communist'), edited by Angarietis, began publishing in Voronezh as an organ of the Central Bureau of the Lithuanian Sections. Thirty-two issues of Komunistas were published until October 1918 as an organ of the Central Bureau of Lithuanian Sections, later the publication became an organ of the Communist Party of Lithuania and Belorussia.

The Second Conference of Lithuanian Communists was held May 26–27, 1918. At the time, the membership of the Lithuanian Sections had decreased significantly. The Central Bureau had allotted one delegate for every 30 party members. Sections with 10–30 members would get one delegate with voting rights, whilst sections with less than 10 members would get a delegate without voting rights. The conference was attended by 16 delegates from Petrograd, Moscow, Smolensk, Vitebsk, Tula, Voronezh, and Nizhny Novgorod with voting rights (V. Kapsukas, K. Giedrys, G. Liutkevičius, E. Tautkaitė, P. Fedaravičius, J. Stašelis, F. Norvydas, A. Bernotas, K. Klorys and others). They represented slightly less than 600 party members. There were 8 delegates without voting rights: Z. Angarietis, J. Lenkaitis, Stasys Matulaitis, P. Mickevičius and Jurgis Smolskis from the Central Bureau, S. Žebrauskas from the Tiesa editorial office, J. Tarvainis from Nizhny Novgorod, and V. Jasaitis from Riga.

At both the first and second conference Kapsukas and Angarietis clashed over tactics on building the communist movement in Lithuania. Kapsukas argued that the Lithuanian Bolsheviks should work within existing labour and left-wing democratic movements, to build support for the Bolshevik line before forming a separate revolutionary party. Angarietis rejected cooperation with non-communist groups and wanted to build a separate, communist party immediately. Angarietis' position prevailed as the RCP(B) threw its weight behind his line, expressed in an article in Izvestia.

== Building the Communist Party in Lithuania ==
The Second Conference of the Lithuanian Sections approved a plan to send revolutionary cadres into Lithuania to build Bolshevik organizations there. In April 1918, the Central Bureau of the Lithuanian Sections sent its first secret emissary Aleksandra Drabavičiūtė (codename Ona) to Lithuania from Moscow. In Vilna, she established contacts with the General Jewish Labour Bund and the internationalist social democrats that had broken away from the Lithuanian Social Democratic Party. The Central Bureau of the Lithuanian Sections formed underground communist cells inside Lithuania and smuggled communist literature across the front-lines.

On August 14, 1918, a clandestine meeting was held in Vilna at which revolutionary social-democrats, under the influence of the Central Bureau of the Lithuanian Sections, established the Communist Party of Lithuania and Belorussia. By the fall of 1918, the Central Bureau of the Lithuanian Sections would be fully dedicated to organizing work within Lithuania. Kapsukas himself was sent twice into Lithuania, officially as a member of the Soviet Russian mission for border regulation on September 22–27, 1918 and in November 1918. In response to Kapsukas' reports from Lithuania, the Central Bureau voted to continue sending more cadres into Lithuania, to send agitators to mobilize in the midst of German soldiers, and to build armed forces.

After the Central Bureau members had left for Lithuania, the activities of the Central Bureau were interrupted for some time. However, local Lithuanian Sections continued to function.

== Lithuanian-Belorussian Department ==
With the merger of the Lithuanian and Byelorussian soviet republics into the Socialist Soviet Republic of Lithuania and Belorussia (SSR LiB) in February 1919, the party decided that the organization among Lithuanian and Belarusian workers should be combined. Thus the Central Bureau of the Lithuanian Sections as well as its Byelorussian sections of the Russian Communist Party (Bolsheviks) were reorganized into the Lithuanian and Belorussian Agitation and Propaganda Department of the Central Committee of the Russian Communist Party (Bolshevik). The Department Board consisted of Rapolas Rasikas (chairman), Jonas Stašelis (secretary) and Chodošas. Rasikas was also put in charge of building the 5th Vilna Infantry Regiment of the Red Army in Moscow, travelling across Soviet Russia to enlist men born in the Lithuanian governorates.

In Odessa, the Lithuanian evacuees published Lietuvių komunistas ('Lithuanian Communist') in the summer of 1919. Some ten issues were published between June and August 1919. J. Kamarauskas was the editor of the newspaper.

The Third Conference of Lithuanian-Belorussian RCP(B) members was held in Moscow on March 17–21, 1920. The conference critically reviewed the functioning of the Soviet Lithuanian and SSR LiB governments in 1918–1919. The conference elected new leadership for the Lithuanian and Belorussian Agitation and Propaganda Section, including R. Rasikas (secretary), V. Kapsukas, Chodoš, Romančiuk and J. Stašelis.

== Lithuanian Bureau re-established ==
In the fall of 1920, as the Belarusian communists in Soviet Russia left for the re-established Byelorussian Socialist Soviet Republic, the organization was re-established as the Central Bureau of the Lithuanian Sections of the Russian Communist Party (Bolsheviks). As of 1920, local sections linked with the Central Bureau included the Lithuanian Department of the Central Committee of the Communist Party (Bolsheviks) of Ukraine (which published the weekly Darbininkų balsas from Kharkov), the Lithuanian Bureau of the Siberian Bureau of the Central Committee of the Russian Communist Party (Bolsheviks) (which published the weekly Komunistų tiesa from Omsk in 1920) and the Lithuanian Bureau of the Central Committee of the Communist Party (Bolsheviks) of Byelorussia. Twenty-three issues of Darbininkų balsas were published, Jonas Stašelis and Vitalis Serbenta edited the newspaper. Thirty-four issues of Komunistų tiesa were published between January 15 and September 9, 1920, with Juozas Steponaitis as the editor.

In the fall of 1920, the disagreements emerged in the Lithuanian Sections in Soviet Russia, with a faction opposed to Kapsukas and Angaretis coming to the forefront. The Fourth Conference of the Lithuanian Sections was held in Moscow on December 1–7, 1920. A new Central Bureau was elected which included Petras Kurkulis-Vardūnas, Pranas Mickevičius-Paprūsis (secretary), R. Rasikas, K. Rimša and J. Stilsonas. On February 7, 1921, the newly-elected Central Bureau of the Lithuanian Sections was approved by the Organizational Bureau of the Central Committee of the Russian Communist Party (Bolsheviks). The leadership of the Central Bureau of the Lithuanian Sections openly opposed the leadership of the Communist Party of Lithuania. Raudonoji vėliava ('Red Banner') was launched as the new organ of the Central Bureau of the Lithuanian Sections. Twenty-three issues of the newspaper were published from Moscow between March 8 to October 23, 1921, with Petras Kurkulis-Vardūnas as the editor. Raudonoji vėliava frequently carried articles by Mickevičius-Paprūsis and Kurkulis-Vardūnas attacking the leadership of the Communist Party of Lithuania. The polemical texts in Raudonoji vėliava caught the attention of the Central Control Commission of the Russian Communist Party (Bolsheviks), which reprimanded the publication for anti-party activities. The opposing faction remained dominant in the Central Bureau of the Lithuanian Sections elected at the Fifth Conference of Lithuanian Communists held in November 1921.

== Central Bureau disbanded ==
With the return of most Lithuanian evacuees to Lithuania, the ranks of the Lithuanian Sections shrunk significantly. On November 11, 1921, the Central Committee of the Russian Communist Party (Bolsheviks) decided to abolish the Central Bureau. Later, the key leaders of the opposing faction (Mickevičius-Paprūsis and Kurkulis-Vardūnas) were expelled from the party.

A Secretariat, with Kazys Giedrys as its secretary, was formed as replacement of the Central Bureau to lead the work of the local Lithuanian Sections of the party. The monthly magazine Komunaras, edited by V. Kapsukas, became the organ of the Lithuanian party sections in December 1921. By 1922, most Lithuanian war refugees had returned to Lithuania, further reducing the membership base of the Lithuanian Sections. There was also a lack of funds for the running of the Lithuanian Sections. Gradually, most Lithuanian Sections were closed down. In January 1923, a meeting of Lithuanian communists voted to disband the Secretariat and shut down the publication of Komunaras. However, a small number of local Lithuanian Sections continued to exist for some time.
