= Kapsukas =

Kapsukas may refer to:

- Vincas Mickevičius-Kapsukas, a communist Lithuanian political activist
- Marijampolė, a city in Lithuania formerly called Kapsukas, in honor of Vincas Kapsukas
