= Zigmas Angarietis =

Lithuanian communist politician (1882–1940)

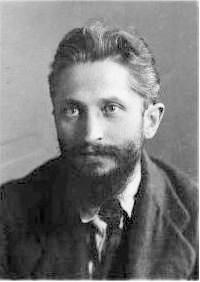
- Born: Zigmontas Antanas Aleksa; 13 June 1882; Obelupiai, Suwałki Governorate, Russian Empire
- Died: 22 May 1940 (aged 57); Moscow, Soviet Union
- Education: Warsaw Veterinary Institute
- Occupations: Communist activist and revolutionary
- Political party: Communist Party of Lithuania

Zigmas Angarietis (born Zigmontas Antanas Aleksa, Russian: Зигмас Ангаретис; 13 June 1882 – 22 May 1940) was a Lithuanian communist and revolutionary, and one of the leaders of the Communist Party of Lithuania. He was one of the main people behind the short-lived Lithuanian Soviet Socialist Republic (1918–1919) and Lithuanian–Belorussian Soviet Socialist Republic (Litbel). Angarietis was arrested in 1938 during the Great Purge and died years later in prison. During his lifetime, he wrote over a hundred Marxist–Leninist works.

== Biography ==
=== Early life and education ===
Angarietis was born in Obelupiai in the Suwałki Governorate of Vistula Land (present-day Lithuania) to a family of wealthy landowners. His brothers Jonas Pranas Aleksa and Konradas Aleksa became Lithuanian Minister of Agriculture and professor at the Lithuanian Agricultural Academy respectively. After graduation from Marijampolė Gymnasium, Angarietis enrolled at the Warsaw Veterinary Institute in 1902. In his memoirs, Angarietis claimed that at the age of 15, he read The Origin of the Family, Private Property and the State by Friedrich Engels, which left a lasting impression on him and turned him to socialism. In Warsaw, he became acquainted with activists from the Polish Socialist Party and the General Jewish Labour Bund in Lithuania, Poland and Russia. For anti-Tsarist protests leading to the Revolution of 1905, he was arrested, expelled from the institute, and served a 6.5-month prison sentence in 1904. The experience prompted Angarietis to devote his life to communist causes.

=== Active revolutionary ===
Angarietis returned to Lithuania. His family did not approve of his revolutionary activities and he severed all ties with them after workers at his father's farm staged a strike and his father called the police to subdue the protest. Angarietis joined the Social Democratic Party of Lithuania in 1906 and was elected to its Central Committee in 1907. He believed that the Lithuanian party should merge with the Russian Social Democratic Labour Party and become its territorial organization (similar to the Social Democracy of the Latvian Territory). In 1908–1909, he organized the publication of illegal newspaper Darbininkų žodis (Voice of Workers) in Marijampolė. For that, he was arrested in June 1909 and received a four-year sentence in September 1911. During his arrest and trial, he was imprisoned in Suwałki, where he had access to a library and was able to write. His works were smuggled out of the prison and later published in the United States. According to communist historian Romas Šarmaitis, 13 works by Angarietis were published in the United States in 1909–1917. In October 1911, he was transferred to Pskov, where living conditions were considerably worse. However, he still continued to write letters and articles, often using pieces of newspapers or packaging for paper.

Upon his release in 1915, he was exiled near Minusinsk in the Yeniseysk Governorate. During the exile, Angarietis got acquainted with Elena Stasova and other communists and became involved with the Russian Social Democratic Labour Party (bolsheviks) (RSDLP(b)), joining its ranks in 1916. He wrote many articles to communist and social democratic press using the pen name Angarietis (from the Angara River), which later became his last name. After the February Revolution, he moved to Petrograd and became actively involved with the Central Bureau of Lithuanian Sections of RSDLP(b). Together with Vincas Mickevičius-Kapsukas, he planned a socialist revolution in Lithuania. In March 1918, Angarietis was sent to Voronezh and tasked with printing communist literature at a nationalized Lithuanian press. He edited newspaper Tiesa, published numerous books, and otherwise spread the communist ideology among Lithuanian war refugees.

In November 1918, Angarietis returned to Lithuania and helped organizing the Communist Party of Lithuania (CPL) and Communist Party (Bolsheviks) of Lithuania and Belorussia. He became People's Commissar of Internal Affairs of the short-lived Lithuanian Soviet Socialist Republic (1918–1919) and Lithuanian–Belorussian Soviet Socialist Republic (Litbel). However, when Soviet Russia lost the Polish–Soviet and Lithuanian–Soviet Wars, these communist states collapsed and the CPL was outlawed in Lithuania.

=== Ideological work ===
After the failure to establish the communist rule in Lithuania, Angarietis retreated to Russia to never visit Lithuania again. First, he lived in Smolensk (1920–1922), and then in Moscow. Angarietis remained involved with the CPL, remaining a member of its Politburo and supervising its underground activities. He wrote numerous books, essays, and pamphlets – his typewritten manuscripts were collected in 48 volumes of 200–300 pages each. Šarmaitis counted a total of 147 works published as separate works, mostly booklets and brochures, before 1940. However, attribution is sometimes difficult as Angarietis wrote under a plethora of pseudonyms. Many of his works were devoted to the history of the Communist Party and the revolutionary movement tracing the class conflict since the feudalism. In 1921, he wrote a 480-page manuscript on the history of the CPL and accused Kapsukas of many practical and ideological mistakes that led to their failure. The conflict was quickly suppressed by Russian communist leaders.

He also edited 18-volume collected works by Lenin and various newspapers, including Komunistas (Communist, 1918–1939), Kibirkštis (Spark, 1924–1926), Balsas (Voice, 1929–1933), and Partijos darbas (Work of the Party, 1931–1933). He also taught party history and other subjects to Lithuanian communists at the Communist University of the National Minorities of the West and the International Lenin School.

Angarietis was a CPL representative and contact person at the Comintern. He was a delegate at the 3–7th Congresses of the Comintern. During the 5–7th Congresses, he was elected to the International Control Commission, of which he was secretary in 1926–1935. He was also a delegate to the 6th, 8th, 10th, and 12–17th Congresses of the Russian Communist Party.

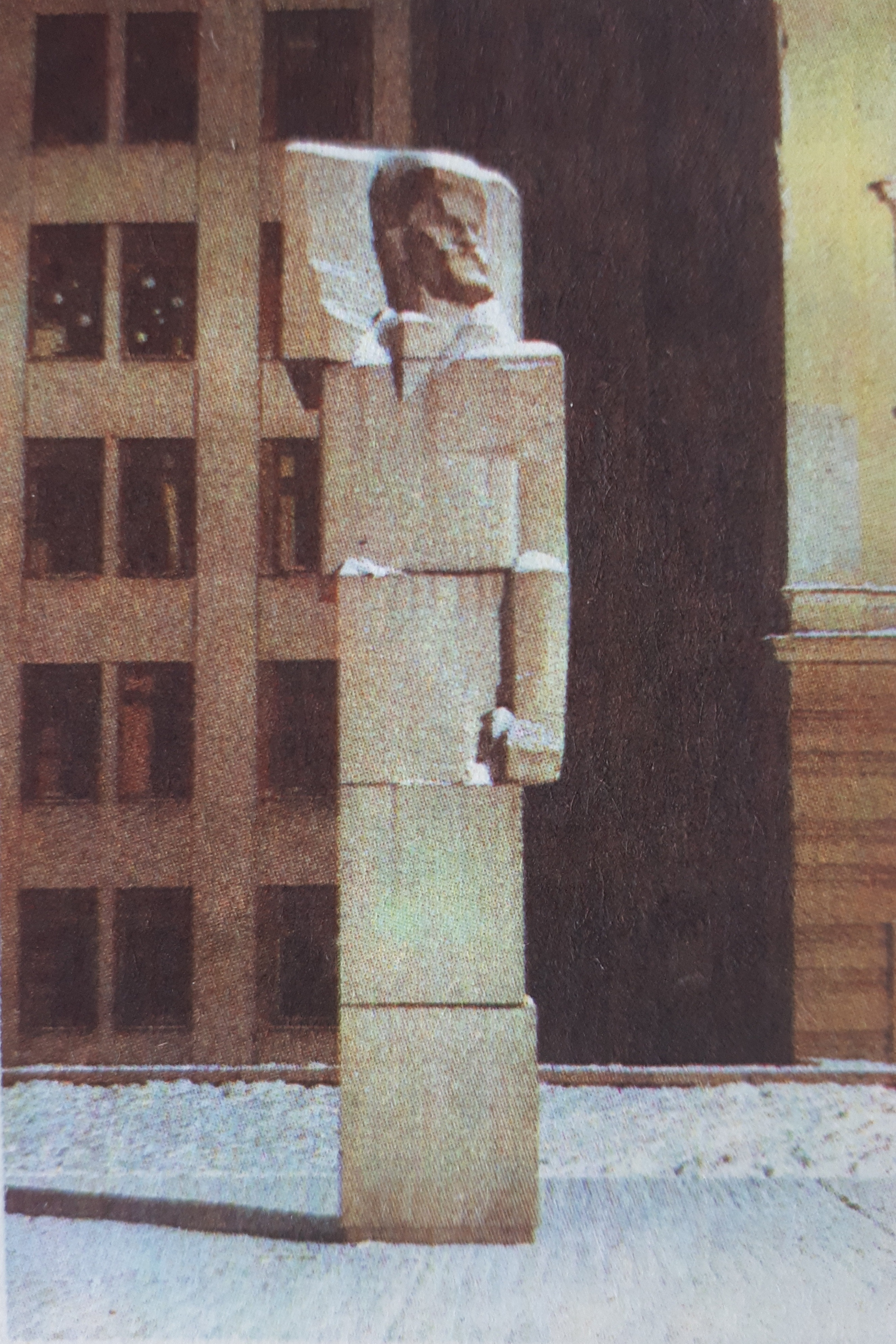
Angarietis monument, Vilnius

=== Death and legacy ===
Angarietis was arrested in March 1938 during the Great Purge and died two years later in a Moscow prison. He was rehabilitated in 1956 during the de-Stalinization campaign. A monument to Angarietis by sculptor Alfonsas Vincentas Ambraziūnas was unveiled in Vilnius in 1972, his 90th birth anniversary. A school in Šakiai, kolkhoz in his native Obelupiai, and streets in Vilnius, Panevėžys, and Kalvarija were named in his honor. After Lithuania restored independence in 1990, the streets were renamed and the monument was moved to Grūtas Park.

== In popular culture ==
Angarietis is portrayed by the actor Milan Marić in the Serbian television series Vreme zla (Times of Evil) based upon a series of novels of the same name by Dobrica Ćosić.
