= Karl Rozental =

Soviet revolutionary (1890–1983)

Karl Rozental

Karl Feodorovich Rozental (Russian: Карл Фёдорович Розенталь; 27 July [O.S. 14 July] 1890 – 15 November 1983) was a Soviet revolutionary and government official, who served as People's Commissar (i.e. cabinet minister position) for Post and Telecommunications in the Socialist Soviet Republic of Lithuania and Belorussia in 1919.

== Early life ==
Rozental was born in Riga on 27 July [O.S. 14 July] 1890. His father was a supervisor at a furniture factory. He graduated from a Realschule in Dvinsk. Rozental attended technical evening courses, and in 1907 he obtained a position at the Trans-Caspian railway. As of June 1912 he was stationed in Tashkent, where he participated in the Turkestan sappers' uprising. The insurrection was quashed and Rozental was placed under investigation, which lasted for about one year. Afterwards, he was placed under police surveillance.

== World War and Revolution ==
At the outbreak of World War I, he was sent to the Western Front as part of the First Turkestan Telegraph Division in July 1914. Following the 1917 February Revolution, he was active in the revolutionary movement in Slutsk. In May 1917, he joined the Russian Social Democratic Labour Party (Bolsheviks). He had been elected to the Soviet of Workers and Soldiers of the city on 3 March 1917, and served as the soviet chairman (a post he left held until March 1918, when Slutsk came under German occupation). Rozental served in the Red Army from July 1918 onwards. In August 1918, he became the Commissar for Post and Telegraphs for the Smolensk District, and in December the same year he got assigned the post of Commissar for Communications of the Western Front.

== People's Commissar ==
When the Socialist Soviet Republic of Belorussia was founded in January 1919, Rozental was included as People's Commissar for Post and Telegraphs. When the Socialist Soviet Republic of Lithuania and Belorussia was founded on 27 February 1919, Rozental was named as People's Commissar for Post and Telegraphs of the new republic. He was a candidate member of the Central Committee of the Communist Party of Lithuania and Belorussia. He was part of the delegation of the Communist Party of Lithuania and Belorussia to the 8th Congress of the Russian Communist Party (Bolsheviks) held in Moscow in March 1919.

== Back in Turkestan ==
On 3 November 1920, he was named as the Head of the Communications Department for the Turkestan Front. He was based in the Turkestan ASSR (later Uzbek SSR) from March 1921 onwards.

== Later career ==
In March 1930, he was appointed as a scientific secretary to the Presidium of the Supreme Council of the National Economy of the USSR. In March 1931, he was named a member of the State Planning Committee of the USSR. From 1939 until his retirement in 1951, Rozental worked as the Head of the General Supply Department for the construction of defense facilities at the Ministry of Internal Affairs of the Soviet Union. Rozental died on 15 November 1983.
