= Kazimierz Cichowski =

Polish revolutionary and noble, Soviet politician (1887–1937)

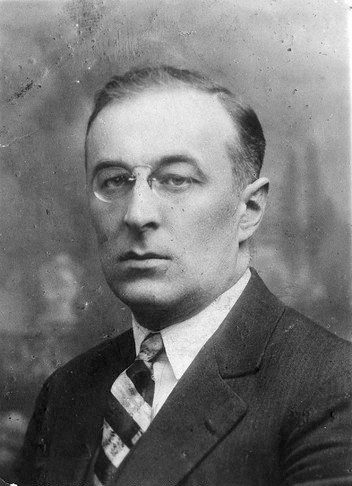

Head of the Minsk Urban Executive Committee
- In office July 1919 – September 1919
- Preceded by: Viktar Yarkin
- Succeeded by: Fritz Küsse

Personal details
- Born: 7 December 1887; Ostrowiec Świętokrzyski, Congress Poland, Russian Empire (now Poland)
- Died: 26 October 1937 (aged 49); Moscow, Russian SFSR, Soviet Union (now Russia)
- Political party: Social Democracy of the Kingdom of Poland and Lithuania (1907–1917); Russian Communist Party (Bolsheviks) (1917–1937)

Kazimierz Cichowski (Russian: Казимир Генрихович Циховский; 7 December 1887 — 26 October 1937) was a Polish-Soviet communist activist and politician, Bolshevik revolutionary and nobleman. Along with Vincas Mickevičius-Kapsukas, he played an important role in establishing the Soviet government in Lithuania and the Lithuanian–Belorussian Soviet Socialist Republic.

== Biography ==
Cichowski was born in Ostrowiec Świętokrzyski in to a family of aristocratic origin. He joined the Social Democracy of the Kingdom of Poland and Lithuania in 1907. In 1907–1909 he studied at the University of Liège, and in 1910–1913 at Sorbonne University.

During the Russian Revolution, he joined the Bolshevik party and from November 1917 he was the deputy Commissar for Polish affairs of the Central Executive Committee of the Lithuanian–Belorussian Soviet Socialist Republic (LitBel), where he soon advanced to more prominent positions (Chairman of the Central Executive Committee of the Congress of Soviets). Following the October Revolution, Cichowski became a deputy People's Commissar of Nationalities for Polish affairs within the Russian Sovnarkom in December 1917. In September 1918, he became a member of the Central Committee of Communist Party of Lithuania.

In 1919 Cichowski was a member of the Lithuanian Provisional Revkom led by Vincas Mickevičius-Kapsukas. Cichowski also was a chairman of the Vilnius City council and a teacher at the Vilnius Communist School. From 27 February 1919 to 31 July 1920, Cichowski served as a chairman of Central Executive Committee of the Lithuanian–Belorussian Soviet Socialist Republic. During that time he also was a member of the Central Committee of Communist Party (Bolsheviks) of Lithuania and Belorussia, People's Commissar of Agriculture (May–July), and member of Defense Council of LitBel. In July–September 1919, possibly under surname of Tikhovskiy, he was a chairman the Minsk city executive committee (ispolkom), which serves as a city governor in Belarus. As the Soviet government was "losing grip" on Lithuania during the 1919–20 Lithuanian–Soviet War, in 1919 Cichowski joined the Russian Bolsheviks Smolensk Governorate Committee becoming a member of the Russian Western Front Political detachment (Politotdel, politruk) and editing the newspaper Kommunist.

After the end of the Lithuanian–Soviet War in 1920 (see Soviet–Lithuanian Peace Treaty), which saw the dissolution of LitBel, he became a member of the Central Committee of the Communist Party of Western Ukraine, operating in the Second Polish Republic. In 1923 Cichowski was given a three-year prison term by the Polish authorities; he was released in 1925 and joined the Central Committee of the Communist Party of Poland, becoming a member of its secretariat and the Political Bureau. In 1927–1929 he was a secretary of communist faction in the Polish Sejm. In 1929 Cichowski was arrested again and in 1930 convicted to 8 years in jail. In 1932 he was exchanged.

In September 1932, he returned to the Soviet Union where he began working in the Comintern (ECCI) at its Executive Committee.

During the Spanish Civil War around January–July 1937, he was in Spain where he was head of the Cadres Department of the International Brigades headquarters. In August 1937, Cichowski was recalled to Moscow, arrested in October or 21 August during the Great Purge, convicted and shot.

Government offices
Preceded by office installed	Central Executive Committee chairman February 1919–July 1920	Succeeded by office liquidated Alexander Chervyakov as CEC chair in Belarus
