= Lithuanian Soviet Republic (1918–1919) =

Soviet puppet state formed during the Lithuanian-Soviet War (1918–19)

Coordinates: 56°N 24°E

Lithuanian Soviet Republic: Lietuvos Tarybų Respublika (Lithuanian); Литовская Советская Республика (Russian)
- 1918–1919
- Flag Emblem

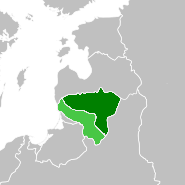
- Map of the Lithuanian Soviet Republic in 1919, with uncontrolled territory shown in light green.
- Status: Puppet state
- Capital: Vilnius
- Common languages: Lithuanian · Russian; Belarusian · Polish; Yiddish
- Government: Soviet republic
  - Chairman of the Provisional Revolutionary Workers' and Peasants' Government of Lithuania: V. Mickevičius-Kapsukas
- Legislature: Provisional Revolutionary Workers' and Peasants' Government of Lithuania
- Historical era: Interwar period
  - Provisional revolutionary government formed: 8 December 1918
  - Republic established: 16 December 1918
  - Recognised by Soviet Russia: 22 December 1918
  - Capture of Vilnius: 5 January 1919
  - Merged with SSR Byelorussia: 27 February 1919
Preceded by	Succeeded by
Lithuania	Lithuanian–Byelorussian Soviet Socialist Republic

The Lithuanian Soviet Republic (LSSR) was a short-lived Soviet puppet state during the early interwar period. It was declared on 16 December 1918 by a provisional revolutionary government led by Vincas Mickevičius-Kapsukas. It ceased to exist on 27 February 1919, when it was merged with the Socialist Soviet Republic of Byelorussia to form the Lithuanian–Byelorussian Soviet Socialist Republic (Litbel) that itself lost control over all of its claimed territories by August 1919.

== Background ==
Germany had lost World War I and signed the Compiègne Armistice on 11 November 1918. Its military forces then started retreating from the former Ober Ost territories. Two days later, the government of the Soviet Russia renounced the Treaty of Brest-Litovsk, which had assured Lithuania's independence. Soviet forces then launched a westward offensive against Estonia, Latvia, Lithuania and Ukraine in an effort to spread the global proletarian revolution and replace national independence movements with Soviet republics. Their forces followed retreating German troops and reached Lithuania by the end of December 1918.

== Formation ==
Soviet front line in January 1919 (red line). The goal of the Soviet offensive was to follow retreating German troops and create Soviet republics in the regions they had vacated.

In Lithuania, the communists were not active until late summer 1918. The Communist Party of Lithuania (CPL) was organized by the 34 delegates at its first congress, held in Vilnius between 1 and 3 October 1918. Pranas Eidukevičius was elected as the first chairman. The party decided to follow examples set by the Russian Communist Party (Bolshevik) and organize a socialist revolution in Lithuania. The plans were instigated and financed by Moscow and supervised by Adolph Joffe and Dmitry Manuilsky. On 2 December Vincas Mickevičius-Kapsukas sent a delegate to bring 15 million rubles to finance the "revolution". On 8 December the CPL formed the eight-member provisional revolutionary government led by Mickevičius-Kapsukas. Its other members were Zigmas Aleksa-Angarietis, Pranas Svotelis-Proletaras, Semyon Dimanstein, Kazimierz Cichowski, Aleksandras Jakševičius, Konstantinas Kernovičius and Yitzhak Weinstein (Aizikas Vainšteinas). Modern historians doubt if the provisional government really met in Vilnius as claimed by the Soviet sources; it is more likely that the government followed the advancing Red Army. Between 16 December 1918 and 7 January 1920 the government resided in Daugavpils, which had been captured by the Red Army on 9 December 1918.

The government issued a manifesto, printed with a 16 December date, declaring the establishment of the Lithuanian Soviet Republic. The manifesto was first published in the Russian newspaper Izvestia on 19 December and then announced on radio. It was then published in Vilnius five days later. A draft of the manifesto, prepared by Kapsukas, stressed the need of close ties with communist Russia and ended with the slogan "Long live the Russian Soviet Federative Socialist Republic with incorporated Soviet Lithuania!" The final version, edited by Stalin and the Russian Communist Party, eliminated references to the union with Russia and replaced the slogan with "Long live freed Soviet Lithuanian Republic!" Kapsukas did not want to establish an independent Soviet republic as he had campaigned for many years against social patriotism, separatism and Lithuanian independence. Influenced by Rosa Luxemburg, he had rejected the idea of self-determination.

The newly formed LSSR asked for assistance from the Russian Soviet Federative Socialist Republic (RSFSR) and it duly recognized the LSSR as an independent state on 22 December. The same day, the Red Army took over Zarasai and Švenčionys on the Lithuanian–Soviet border. The provisional government then seemed to dissolve and did not attempt to gain wider recognition. The Lithuanian Army, in its infancy, was unable to offer resistance to the Soviet advance. On 5 January 1919 the Red Army captured Vilnius and, by the end of January 1919, the Soviets controlled about two-thirds of Lithuania's territory.

Similar republics were established in Latvia (the Latvian Socialist Soviet Republic) and Estonia (the Commune of the Working People of Estonia).

== Government ==
The LSSR was new, weak and had to rely on Russian assistance. In Russia, the Soviets were generally supported by the industrial working class, but this was too small in Lithuania. On 21 January the RSFSR granted a loan of 100 million rubles to the provisional government. The LSSR did not form its own army. In February 1919, Kapsukas sent a telegram to Moscow arguing that conscription of local Lithuanians to the Red Army would only encourage Lithuanians to volunteer for the Lithuanian Army. Meanwhile, in the territory it had occupied, the Soviets created revolutionary committees and councils based on Russian models.

The Soviets demanded large war contributions from captured cities and villages. For example, Panevėžys was required to pay 1 million rubles, Utena 200,000 rubles, while 10 rubles were demanded from villages. They nationalized commercial institutions and large estates, assigning land for use in collective farming rather than redistribution to smaller farms. Economic difficulties and cash shortage was illustrated by a decree published in January 1919 prohibiting financial institutions to pay more than 250 rubles per week to any resident. In a country of staunch Catholics and determined nationalists, the Soviet promotion of internationalism and atheism alienated the local population and contributed, ultimately, to the Soviets' eventual withdrawal.

=== Members of the Council of People's Commissars ===
Members of the Council of People's Commissars
Position	As of 6 January 1919	As of 22 January 1919
Commissar of foreign affairs	Vincas Mickevičius-Kapsukas (also chairman)	
Commissar of internal affairs	Zigmas Aleksa-Angarietis (also deputy chairman)	
Commissar of food	Aleksandras Jakševičius	M. Slivkin
Commissar of labor	Semyon Dimanstein	
Commissar of finance	Kazimierz Cichowski	
Commissar of transport	Pranas Svotelis-Proletaras	Aleksandras Jakševičius
Commissar of agriculture	Yitzhak Weinstein-Branovski	Vaclovas Bielskis
Commissar of education	Vaclovas Biržiška	
Commissar of communications	–	Pranas Svotelis-Proletaras
Commissar of military affairs	–	Rapolas Rasikas
Commissar of the people's economy	–	Yitzhak Weinstein-Branovski
Commissar of trade and industry	–	Yitzhak Weinstein-Branovski

== Dissolution and aftermath ==
Between 8 and 15 February 1919, Lithuanian and German volunteers stopped the Soviet advance and prevented them from taking Kaunas, the temporary capital of Lithuania. At the end of February, the Germans started an offensive in Latvia and northern Lithuania. Faced with military difficulties and unreceptive locals, the Soviets decided to combine the weak Lithuanian and Byelorussian SSRs into the Lithuanian–Byelorussian Soviet Socialist Republic (Litbel), led by Kapsukas. The communist parties were also merged into the Communist Party (bolsheviks) of Lithuania and Belorussia. However, that had little effect and Polish forces took Vilnius in April and Minsk in August 1919 during the Polish–Soviet War. Litbel was also dissolved.

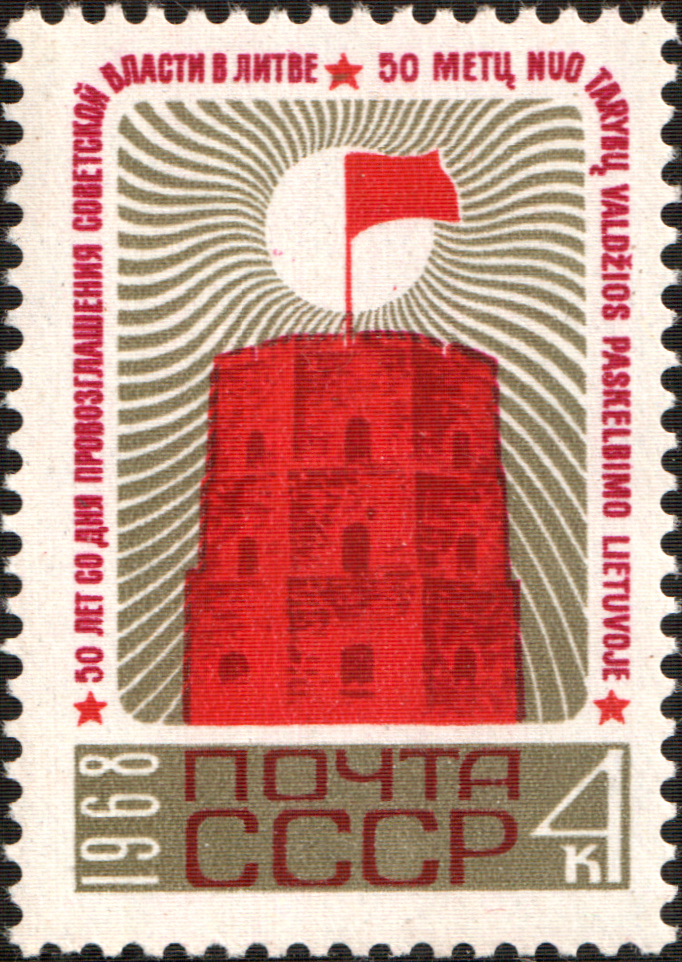
A 1968 Soviet stamp dedicated to the 50th anniversary of the first Lithuanian Soviet Republic.

When the tide turned in the Polish–Soviet War, the Soviets captured Vilnius on 14 July 1920. They did not transfer the city to the Lithuanian administration, as agreed in the Soviet–Lithuanian Peace Treaty, signed just two days before. Instead, the Soviets planned a coup to overthrow the Lithuanian government and re-establish a Soviet republic as they did with the Byelorussian Soviet Socialist Republic. However, they lost the Battle of Warsaw and were pushed back by the Poles. Some historians credit this victory for saving Lithuania's independence from the Soviet coup. During the interwar years, Lithuanian–Soviet relations were generally friendly, but, a few months after the outbreak of World War II, the Soviet Union decided to occupy the Baltic states, including Lithuania, in July 1940. Official Soviet propaganda described the occupation as the "restoration of Soviet power by revolutionary masses".

A Soviet Party historian, K. Navickas, commented in the November 1959 issue of Komunistas: "The fact that the Government of the RSFSR recognized a young Soviet Lithuanian Republic unmasked the lie of the USA and British imperialists that Soviet Russia allegedly sought rapacious aims with regard to the Baltic countries".

== See also ==
- History of Lithuania
- Kingdom of Lithuania (1918)
- Republics of the Soviet Union
