= Kaunas Soviet of Workers Deputies =

Communist soviet in German-occupied Kaunas, Lithuania

The Kaunas Soviet of Workers Deputies (Lithuanian: Kauno darbininkų atstovų taryba, Russian: Ковенский совет рабочих депутатов) was a soviet (council) in Kaunas/Kovno (then under German occupation) that sought to act as a communist government for the city and its surroundings. The Kaunas Soviet functioned between 18 December 1918 and 13 January 1919, but was disbanded in the wake of the defeat of the Spartacist Uprising in Germany.

== Preparations for the Soviet ==
In late November and early December 1918, preparations for the formation of workers soviets took place in Kaunas, Šiauliai, and Panevėžys. On 17 December 1918 the Communist Party of Lithuania and Belorussia organized a strike and protest in Kaunas, calling for Soviet power. The Kaunas Soviet was established the following day. The Communist Party of Lithuania and Belorussia won 35 out of the 45 seats in the Kaunas Soviet. The other parties were the General Jewish Labour Bund with seven seats, the United Jewish Socialist Workers Party with two seats, and the Revolutionary Socialist People's Party of Lithuania with one seat. Per later Soviet histography, 'social patriotic' organizations wanted to take part in the election to the Soviet but were barred from participation.

In parallel to the formation of the Kaunas Soviet, elections to a City Council were held on 18–19 December 1918. The communists called for a boycott of the City Council election, arguing for the Soviet as the sole form of government. The General Jewish Labour Bund and the United Jewish Socialist Workers Party participated in both the Soviet and City Council election.

== Inaugural session ==
The first session of the Kaunas Soviet opened at the House of the People on 21 December 1918. A Presidium was elected, consisting of six communists and one Bundist. Viktoras Griškelis was the chairman of the Kaunas Soviet. The meeting declared the Kaunas Soviet as the sole authority of the city and the Kovno Governorate. The meeting sent greetings to the Council of People's Commissars of Soviet Russia, the Spartacists in Germany, and other revolutionary movements.

Seeking to curb shortages, the Soviet banned the transport of food and industrial produce out of the city without its permission. The Kaunas Soviet resolved to adopt an eight hour work-day, and introduced work place protection for labourers. The Soviet issued a warning that officials refusing to heed to the instructions of the Soviet would face 'severe punishment' once Soviet power was established in Lithuania. A number of departments were set up under the Kaunas Soviet, including Food, Justice, Administration, and Labour.

== Tensions and negotiations with the Soldatenrat and City Council ==
The City Council held its inaugural meeting the following day, 22 December 1918. Both the Kaunas Soviet and the City Council sought to build armed militias. The Kaunas Soviet approached the Soldatenrat ('Soldiers Council', of the German Army), requesting armaments. The Soldatenrat responded that it alone maintained order in the city. The Soldatenrat proceeded to arrest the Soviet chairman and six of its deputies, who were released after committing not to purchase firearms.

At first, the Kaunas Soviet had declared the City Council disbanded. However, after a visit from a delegation of the City Council to the Soviet, the Soviet retracted this demand. Instead, the City Council recognized the authority of the Soviet, whilst the Soviet recognized that the City Council would remain in charge of the economy of the city. The City Council committed to consulting with the Soviet Commissioner of City Economy, and that decrees of the City Council would be stamped with the seal of approval of the Soviet Presidium. Negotiations took place on transfer of authority of the city militia and management of prison to the Soviet.

== Berlin delegation ==
The German government issued an order (co-signed by Friedrich Ebert and Hugo Haase) to the Soldatenrat of the Eastern Front to expel the Kaunas Soviet and transfer the civil control of the city to Lithuanian moderates. The Soldatenrat was based the city. It included many followers of the Independent Social Democratic Party of Germany (USPD) and thus reluctant to take actions against the Kaunas Soviet. The Soldatenrat proposed to the Kaunas Soviet to send a delegation to Berlin to negotiate with the German government. Lev Zalin, deputy chairman of the Kaunas Soviet, travelled to Berlin on 1 January 1919, accompanied by representatives of the (German) Central Soldiers Council of the Eastern Front and the Kaunas Soldiers Council. The delegation was received by Philipp Scheidemann, who stated that German forces would withdraw from Lithuania, that he sympathized with a Lithuanian government consisting of all socialist parties but stated that the future of governance of Lithuania would be in the hands of the Entente. The delegation also met the USPD leader Haase, who implied that the order to disband the Kaunas Soviet was issued under pressure from the Entente. The delegation left Berlin for Königsberg, where they attended the Congress of Soldiers Councils of the Eastern Front and East Prussia (an event which called for support to Soviet Lithuania, urged diplomatic recognition of Soviet Russia, and called for action against the Polish Republic).

== Defeat of the Spartacists and the end of the Soviet ==
Zalin returned to Kaunas on 9 January 1919. But the situation in Germany changed dramatically, with the attack of the Freikorps against the Spartacists on 10 January 1919. The counter-revolutionaries in the German Army in Kaunas rallied, and on 10 January 1919 they attacked the Kaunas Soviet headquarters. Some forty people were arrested, albeit they were later released by the Soldatenrat. On 13 January 1919 German soldiers again besieged the buildings of the Kaunas Soviet, arresting 69 persons (Soviet deputies and labour organizers). The Kaunas Soviet became defunct. On 2 April 1919 a prisoner exchange took place in Kaišiadorys between the Germany Army and the Socialist Soviet Republic of Lithuania and Belorussia, whereby the German Army released 24 prisoners (including members the Kaunas Soviet) in exchange for 13 detained members of the German delegation in Vilna (led by G. von Trützschler). The released prisoners included Balys Petniūnas, Balys Mickevičius, V. Griškelis and L. Zalin.
