= Młot (Minsk) =

Polish newspaper

16 March 1919 issue of Młot

Młot ('Hammer') was a Polish language newspaper. It was published as a daily in Minsk in the 1920s.

The first issue was published in Minsk on 18 December 1918. The newspaper continued publications, albeit at times irregularly, until 1926, with the place of publishing shifting thrice in 1919; to Vilna, back to Minsk, then Smolensk and yet again back to Minsk in 1921. It was one of the main Polish newspapers in the Soviet Union.

During its first issues, Młot was an organ of the Social Democracy of the Kingdom of Poland and Lithuania (SDKPiL). On 30 December 1918 Młot became an organ of the Communist Workers Party of Poland (KPRP) in Russia. On 23 February 1919 the newspaper became a joint organ of the Central Executive Committee of KPRP and the Central Committee of the Communist Party of Lithuania and Belorussia. On 9 March 1921 the newspaper became the organ of the Polish Bureau of the Central Bureau of the Communist Party (Bolshevik) of Belorussia. In February 1924 Młot became the organ of the Polish Bureau of the Provisional Belorussian Bureau of the Central Committee of the Russian Communist Party (Bolshevik). Between 3 April 1924 and 17 May 1924, Młot was an organ of the Provisional Belorussian Bureau of the Central Committee of the Russian Communist Party (Bolshevik).
