= Waclaw Bogucki =

Polish revolutionary and high ranking official

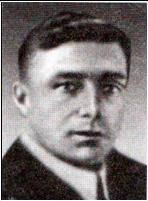

First Secretary of the Communist Party of Byelorussia
- In office 1922–1924

Personal details
- Born: 1884 Buraków
- Died: 19 December 1937 (aged 52–53)
- Party: SDKPiL (1904–1918); Russian Communist Party (1918–1937)

Wacław Bogucki (Russian: Вацлав Антонович Богуцкий; 1884 – 19 December 1937) was a Polish revolutionary, Soviet politician and high-ranking official of Communist International who served as the First Secretary of the Communist Party of Byelorussia from 1922 to 1924.

== Biography ==
He was born in Buraków (in Gmina Łomianki). A metal worker, he joined the Social Democratic Party of the Kingdom of Poland and Lithuania (SDPiL), which was led by Rosa Luxemburg and Leo Jogiches, in 1904 in Zakopane in the Austrian ruled part of Poland. As an active party member, he was arrested eight times, and spent four years in prison. In 1910, he emigrated to the US, where he joined a group of Polish social democratic workers. He moved to Russia in 1912. After the February Revolution, in 1917, he set up a social democrat organisation among exiled Polish workers in Tiflis, in Georgia, and was elected to the Tiflis soviet. In 1918, he joined the Communist Party (CP) of Belorussia (Belarus), and was arrested while Belarus was under German occupation. but soon escaped and moved to Grodno, where he was elected chairman of the Grodno CP, and of the Grodno soviet. In 1919, he was elected to the Central Committee of the Communist Party of Lithuania and Belorussia. In 1921 – after the Soviet government had recognised Lithuania's independence – he was appointed a secretary of the Belorussian CP. In 1924, he was Belorussian People's Commissar for the Interior, but later that year was transferred to the Polish section of Comintern, and appointed a candidate member of Comintern's Praesidium, and represented Comintern at congresses of the Polish CP in the late 1920s. He was a member of the Central Committee of the Polish Communist Party from 1925 to 1930. In 1930–37, he worked in the office the Chief Prosecutor of the USSR. He was arrested in September 1937, during the Polish operation of the NKVD, and was sentenced to death on 19 December, and shot the same day.

== Family ==
Bogucki's wife, Michalina Nowicka, was an Old Bolshevik, born in 1896, who worked in the TASS news agency, and as a librarian at the Lenin Institute. She was arrested soon after her husband, and spent eight years in labour camps. Their 13-year-old son, Vladimir, was sent to an orphanage. When she was released, she searched for her son, but could not find him, because he had been caught stealing a watermelon and a cantaloupe when he was hungry, and had been sentenced to ten years in a labour camp. She died in a retirement home "lonely and sick".
