= Byelorussian Communist Organization =

The Byelorussian Communist Organisation (Russian: Белорусская коммунистическая организация, abbreviated БКО, translit. 'BKO') was a communist group in Belarus, led by Usievalad Ihnatoŭski. It emerged from the organisation 'Young Belarus' (Маладая Беларусь), which was founded in the Minsk Teaching Institute in 1917. In 1918 the group became an autonomous section of the Byelorussian Party of Socialists - Revolutionary. On 1 January the group broke away and formed the BKO as a separate party. In August 1920 BKO merged into the Communist Party of Lithuania and Byelorussia.
