= Young Communist League of Lithuania and Belorussia =

The Young Communist League of Lithuania and Belorussia (Belarusian: Камуністычны Саюз Моладзі Літвы і Беларусі, abbreviated КСМЛіБ, Lithuanian: Lietuvos ir Baltarusijos Komunistinės Jaunimo Sąjungos, abbreviated L ir BKJS, Russian: Коммунистический Союз Молодежи Литвы и Белоруссии, abbreviated КСМЛиБ) was a youth organization in Lithuania and Belorussia 1919–1920.

== Organization ==
The organization was founded in Minsk on February 10, 1919, at a joint session of the Presidium of the Central Committee of the Young Communist League of Belorussia and the Provisional Central Bureau of the Young Communist League of Lithuania. The meeting decided to merge the Lithuanian and Belorussian communist youth organizations. The founding congress elected a Central Committee, whose secretary was Juozas Greifenbergeris (who remained at the helm of the organization throughout its existence). Other members of the Central Committee were S. Alperavičius, A. Movšenzonas and Nikolay Volov. Following the founding meeting, a special appeal to the youth was issued by the organization on February 14, 1919. The Provisional Central Bureau of the organization was based at 9, Varnų Street (present-day A. Jakšto Street) hosted the party headquarters.

By the beginning March 1919 the organization had some 300 members in Vilna. Most of them were part of the Liebknecht Military Detachment which fought at the frontlines during the Polish offensive.

The organization planned to hold a congress June 25, 1919, but this had to be postponed due to the situation on the Western Front. It was then planned for July 16, 1919, but could not be held.

The organization was active behind the frontlines, organizing underground cells in areas under the control of the Republic of Lithuania. Young communist cells were formed in Vilna, Kaunas and Rokiškis in the latter half of 1919. In 1920 clandestine cells were created in Marijampolė, Vilkaviškis, Panevėžys, Šiauliai, Joniškis, Jonava, Dotnuva and Ukmergė. In Minsk organizers in the underground included Vorobyov (Central Committee member), Zaidenvar ('Zucker'), Savchik, Zak and Proshchitsky. Other active underground cells of the organization existed in Bobruisk, Slutsk, Grodno and other locations under Polish occupation.

An organizational conference of the organization was held in Vilna April 1920 - which reaffirmed Greifenbergeris' role as the leader of the organization and elected him as its delegate to the congress of the Russian Young Communist League. The conference adopted a program based on that of the Russian Young Communist League. On May 4, 1920, a Lithuanian Central Bureau of the organization was founded at a conference in Kaunas. Members of the Lithuanian Central Bureau included, at different stages, Greifenbergeris, Rapolas Čarnas, Aizik Lifshits, Antanas Stasiūnas, Eugenija Tautkaitė, Jonas Žagas and Leiba Šapira. The organization held a Kaunas regional conference in July 1920 and a Suwalki regional conference on August 24, 1920.

The organization was divided into separate Lithuanian and Belorussian youth organizations on November 5, 1920. The Lithuanian Central Bureau became the leading body of the Young Communist League of Lithuania. The Young Communist League of Belorussia was reconstituted as an integral part of the Russian Young Communist League.

== International affiliation ==
On February 29, 1920, the organization became a section of the Communist Youth International.

== Press ==
The organization began publishing the Russian language periodical Fakel kommunizma ('Torch of Communism') on March 2, 1919. The first issue was published in Vilna, the second and third were issued from Minsk as the joint organ of the Central Committee and Minsk Committee of the organization. It was edited by Greifenbergeris.

On March 11, 1919, another Russian language periodical, the weekly Krasnaya molodezh ('Red Youth'), was launched. In August 1920 the Lithuanian Central Bureau began publishing the periodical Jaunasis komunistas ('Young Communist').
