= Aron Vainshtein =

Jewish activist (1877–1938)

- Арон Исаакович Вайнштейн
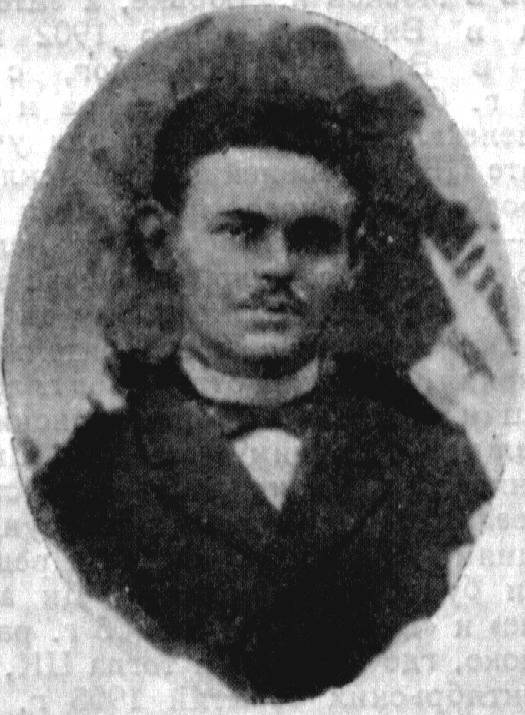
- Born: 23 November 1877; Vilna, Russian Empire
- Died: 12 March 1938 (aged 60); Moscow, USSR
- Other name: Rakhmiel
- Citizenship: Russian Empire, Soviet Belorussia
- Occupation: politician

Aron Isaakovich Vainshtein (23 November 1877 – 12 March 1938), known by the nom de guerre Rakhmiel, was a Jewish socialist activist and politician in Soviet Belorussia.

In 1897, Vainshtein graduated from the Vilna Jewish Teaching Institute. In 1898, Vainshtein, now based in Warsaw, joined the General Jewish Labour Bund. He quickly emerged as the leading figure in the Warsaw Committee of the Bund. During the early period of the Bund movement, Vainshtein's Warsaw faction opposed the line of calling for Jewish national rights of John Mill's Geneva-based leadership. The fourth Bund congress in 1901 elected him to the Bund Central Committee. In 1914 he was exiled to Siberia, where he remained until the 1917 February Revolution.

The tenth Bund congress elected him as the Chairman of the Bund Central Committee. Along with the rest of the Bund Central Committee, he shifted to Minsk. He was elected as chairman of the Minsk City Duma.

Inside the Bund, Vainshtein came to vacillate between centrist, rightist, and leftist positions. On the question of World War I he placed himself in the centrist camp but he sided with the Bund right-wing in condemnation of the October Revolution. As the Russian Civil War emerged and with the German Revolution of 1918–1919 he moved to the left. As the Bund split at the April 1920 twelfth congress, Vainshtein and his sister-in-law Esther Frumkin led the pro-communist Kombund majority faction.

During 1920 and 1921 Frumkin and Vaynsthteyn were the key leaders of the Kombund. Vainshtein served as the Kombund representative in the Military Revolutionary Committee of Belorussia from August to December 1920. In December 1920 he was named the acting chairman of the Belorussian Council of National Economy. While heading this body, he was accused by the Yevsektsia (Jewish Section of the Communist Party) of implementing a petty bourgeois Bundist economic policy.

Unity talks between the Kombund and the Communist Party lasted for months; in the end the Communist International ordered the Bund to dissolve itself. At an Extraordinary All-Russian Bundist Conference, held in Minsk on March 5, 1921 the delegates representing some 3,000 party members debated disbanding the Communist Bund. At the conference Vainshtein spoke in favour of disbanding the Kombund and merging with the Communist Party.

In 1921 he was inducted into the Yevsektsia Central Bureau, where he remained until 1924. He served as Deputy Chairman of the Council of People's Commissars of the Kirghiz Autonomous Socialist Soviet Republic from 1921 to 1922. Between 1923 and 1930 he served on the board of the People's Commissariat of Finance of the USSR. He was a board member of KOMZET, becoming its deputy chairman in 1928. During the 1930s he headed the Moscow branch of OZET.

Vainshtein was arrested in February 1938. He reportedly committed suicide after ten days in detention.
