= Socialist Soviet Republic of Byelorussia =

Short-lived socialist state in present-day Belarus (1919)

Socialist Soviet Republic of Byelorussia: Савецкая Сацыялістычная Рэспубліка Беларусь (Belarusian); Социалистическая Советская Республика Белоруссия (Russian)
- 1919
- Flag Coat of arms

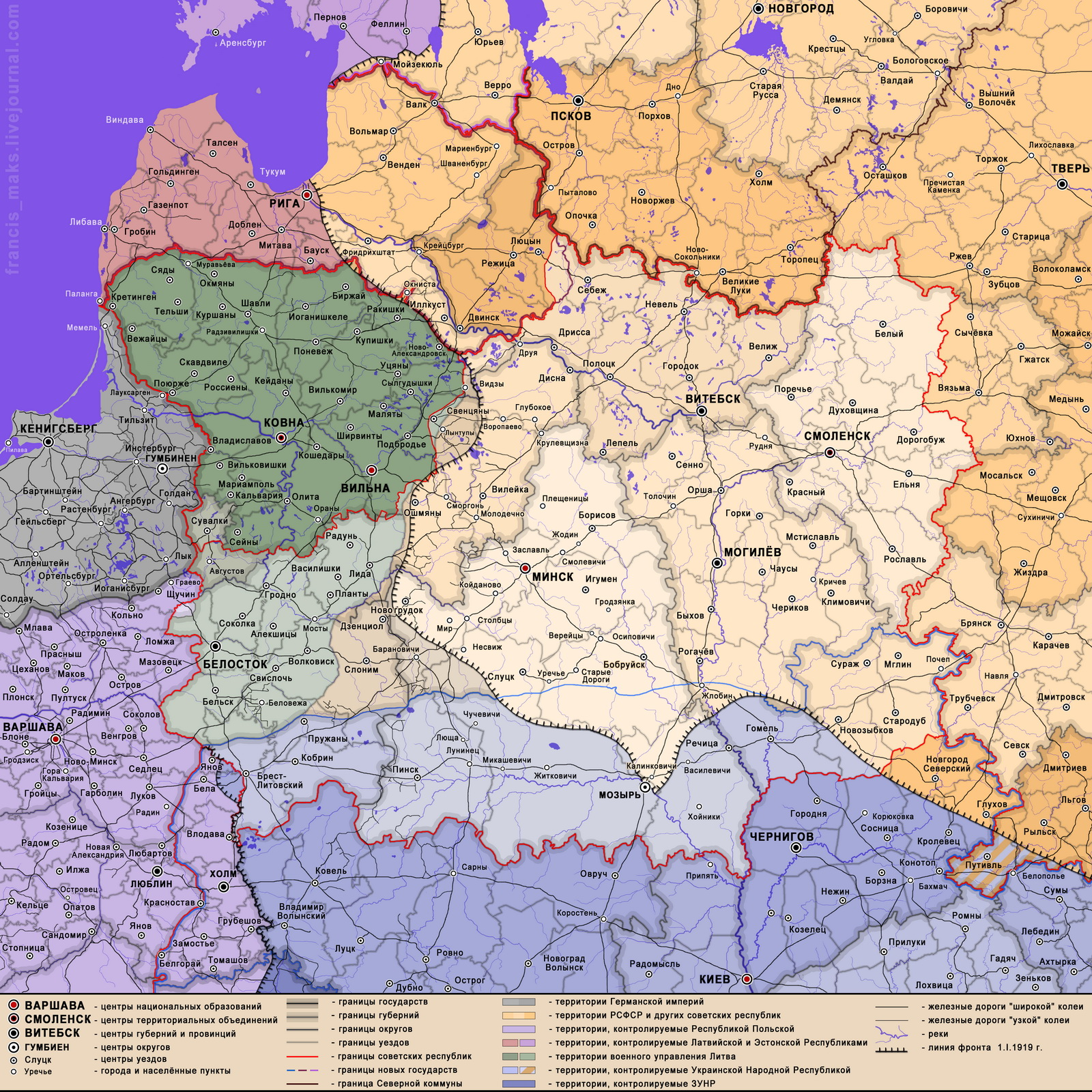
- Status: Buffer state of Soviet Russia
- Demonyms: Belarusian, Byelorussian
- Government: Soviet republic
- History
  - Established: 1 January 1919
  - Disestablished: February 1919
Preceded by	Succeeded by
Belarusian People's Republic	Socialist Soviet Republic of Lithuania and Belorussia
- Today part of: Belarus

The Socialist Soviet Republic of Byelorussia (Note: Also spelled Socialist Soviet Republic of Belorussia or Socialist Soviet Republic of Belarus.) (Note: Belarusian: Сацыялістычная Савецкая Рэспубліка Беларусь, romanized: Sacyjalistyčnaja Savieckaja Respublika Biełaruś; Russian: Социалистическая Советская Республика Белоруссия / ССРБ, romanized: Sotsialisticheskaya Sovetskaya Respublika Belorussiya / SSRB.) (SSRB) was a short-lived soviet republic, that existed in the territory of Belarus from the end of December 1918 to the middle of February 1919, centered in Minsk. It was created in Belarusian regions of the Western Oblast, and was later merged into the Socialist Soviet Republic of Lithuania and Belorussia.

== History ==
On 27 August 1918, the Treaty of Berlin was signed between German Empire and Soviet Russia, and it was agreed (under the article 3) that German troops will evacuate territories east of the Berezina river, thus returning various eastern parts of the Western Oblast to the Russian control. Germany also agreed (under the article 4) not to support local separatist movements, thus effectively abandoning the Belarusian People's Republic, that existed in German-held parts of Belarus.

In the autumn of 1918, during the Soviet westward offensive, regional authorities of the Western Oblast, centered in Smolensk, debated on future political solutions regarding Belarus. By December of the same year, last German forces left Minsk and western parts of Belarus, relinquishing those regions to the Red Army.

By 30 December, upon receiving instructions from Moscow, regional authorities in Smolensk decided to establish Belarus as a soviet republic. Those decisions were proclaimed on 1 January 1919, thus creating the Socialist Soviet Republic of Byelorussia, that was encompassing governorates of Smolensk, Vitebsk, Mogilev, Minsk, Grodno, and Vilna.

It was considered by Bolsheviks to be a buffer republic, but it was short-lived. By the middle of February (1919) it was disbanded. The Smolensk, Vitebsk and Mogilev provinces were included into the Russian Soviet Federative Socialist Republic (RSFSR), while the remainder merged with the Lithuanian Soviet Socialist Republic, and formed another buffer republic, the Lithuanian–Belorussian Soviet Socialist Republic (Litbel).

The republic was re-established under the same name on 31 July 1920. However, in traditional Soviet historiography it has been referred to as the Byelorussian Soviet Socialist Republic (BSSR), its name after the incorporation into the Soviet Union in 1922.

== See also ==
- History of Belarus
- Minsk Governorate
- Mogilev Governorate
- Vilna Governorate
- Vitebsk Governorate
- Western Oblast (1917-1918)

== Sources ==
- Kasmach, Lizaveta (2023). Belarusian Nation-Building in Times of War and Revolution. Budapest: Central European University Press.
- Sukiennicki, Wiktor (1965). "Stalin and Byelorussia's Independence". The Polish Review. 10 (4): 84–107.
