= Yakov Doletsky =

Polish revolutionary

Yakov Genrikhovich Doletsky (Polish: Dolecki, Russian: Яков Генрихович Долецкий; real name Fenigstein; 1888 – 19 June 1937) was a Polish revolutionary and long-serving head of the Soviet news agency TASS.

== Career ==
Doletsky was born in Warsaw in 1888. In 1904, at the age of sixteen, Doletsky joined the Social Democracy of the Kingdom of Poland and Lithuania (SDKPiL), a party led by Rosa Luxemburg and Jan Tyszka. He was soon arrested and imprisoned. After his release, he worked for the SDKPiL abroad, then returned to Poland to operate illegally in Warsaw and Łódź. In 1912, he supported the 'rozlamovist' group within the party who opposed Tyszka's leadership style and who were allied with Vladimir Lenin and the Bolsheviks. He represented the group at the abortive 'unification' conference in Brussels in July 1914, which was supposed to reunite the separate factions of the Russian Social Democratic Labour Party and the SDPKiL. Again arrested on his return to Poland, he spent two years in prison. On his release in 1916, he joined the Bolsheviks.

From March to November 1919, Doletsky was deputy chairman of the Council of People's Commissars and People's Commissar of Internal Affairs in the short-lived Soviet republic of Lithuania and Belarus.

In 1922, he was appointed executive secretary of the ROSTA news agency.

From 1925 to 1937, he was the executive head of TASS, the main Soviet news agency and one of the largest news agencies in the world, from its inception in 1925 until 1937.

Every well-known former member of the SDPKiL was arrested during the Great Purge of 1936–38. Doletsky's died on 19 June 1937. According to some sources, he was shot, but according to his family, he committed suicide knowing that his arrest was imminent.

== Personality ==
Eugene Lyons, who worked for TASS in the US and regularly corresponded with Doletsky, was disillusioned on meeting in Moscow in 1928:

At the far end of a long room stood a vast and shiny desk covered with many telephones and push buttons, and behind its imposing expanse sat a bearded, obese little man, blinking behind thick glasses. I was fated to become excessively familiar with the species of ex-revolutionary known as a bureaucrat – people who once risked their lives for a cause but now trembled at the thought of risking their job by a bold word or gesture."

Alexander Barmine saw Doletsky, whom he described as a "conscientious official and the kind of man who never got involved in political quarrels", and Deputy People's Commissar for Foreign Affairs, Nikolai Krestinsky, on two occasions early in 1937: "On the first occasion they were still both normal men, preoccupied naturally, but capable of smiling, joking, making plans, giving advice. Three weeks later they were gloomy and nervous, so absorbed in their inward thoughts that they spoke in dismal tones, stared inattentively, and hardly understood what I said to them. They knew themselves to be doomed men."

== Family ==
Doletsky's wife, Sofia Stanevich, (1897–1961) was an engineer who survived 17 years in the gulag.

Their son, Stanislav (1919–1994) worked as a surgeon from 1941 and rose to chief children's surgeon for the RSFSR Ministry of Health. His first wife, Kira Daniel-Bek Pirumyan, was the granddaughter of Prince Daniel Bek-Pirumyan, hero of the Battle of Sardarabad.

Their daughter, Alena (Aliona) Doletskaya, was editor in chief of Vogue Russia between 1998 and 2010. She played Sofia and her nephew Artem played Stanislav in a film about the family history made in 2010 as part of an anti-Stalin project.
