= Vincas Mickevičius-Kapsukas =

Lithuanian politician (1880–1935)

- Kapsukas c. 1918

1st Chairman of the Council of People's Commissars of the Lithuanian–Byelorussian SSR
- In office 27 February 1919 – 19 July 1919
- Preceded by: Position established
- Succeeded by: Position abolished

1st Chairman of the Council of People's Commissars of the Lithuanian SSR
- In office 8 December 1918 – 27 February 1919
- Preceded by: Position established
- Succeeded by: Position abolished

Personal details
- Born: 7 April 1880 Vilkaviškis, Congress Poland, Russian Empire
- Died: 17 February 1935 (aged 54) Moscow, Russian SFSR, Soviet Union
- Resting place: Novodevichy Cemetery
- Party: Lithuanian Social Democratic Party (1903–1917); Russian Communist Party (Bolsheviks) (1917–1935)
- Education: University of Bern

Vincas Mickevičius, known under his pen name Kapsukas (7 April [O.S. 26 March] 1880 – 17 February 1935), was a Lithuanian communist political activist, publicist, and revolutionary.

As an active member of the Lithuanian National Revival, he wrote for and edited many Lithuanian publications and joined the Lithuanian Social Democratic Party. As his views turned from nationalism to socialism, and then to communism, he became one of the founders and leaders of the Lithuanian Communist Party and headed the short-lived Lithuanian Soviet Socialist Republic and Lithuanian–Belorussian Soviet Socialist Republic (Litbel) in 1918–1919. After the fall of these republics, Mickevičius left for Soviet Russia, where he continued to lead the Lithuanian communists and worked for the Communist International (Comintern).

== Biography ==
=== Early life and education ===
Mickevičius was born in 1880 in the town of Vilkaviškis, Vilkaviškis district, to a family of wealthy Lithuanian farmers. Suvalkija was then in Congress Poland, part of the Russian Empire. Following the January Uprising of 1863, the tsarist government imposed the Lithuanian press ban, which outlawed materials printed in the Lithuanian language. Vincas' father Simonas and elder brother Juozas were Lithuanian patriots. His uncle Antanas Mickevičius was daraktorius, a founder of and a teacher at underground Lithuanian schools. Vincas Mickevičius was exposed to old illegal issues of Auszra monthly magazine, hidden in the family home, from an early age.

Around 1888–1892, he was tutored at home and attended a Lithuanian school run by his uncle. From 1892 to 1897, Mickevičius studied at Marijampolė Gymnasium. In 1895, he became an active participant in the Lithuanian National Revival when his brother Juozas introduced him to the secret book smuggling society Sietynas, a group that printed Lithuanian books and periodicals in East Prussia, smuggled them and disseminated them into Lithuania. After graduating from the Gymnasium in 1897, Mickevičius enrolled at the Sejny Priest Seminary, but was expelled after a year for his illegal political activities. He was a member of the secret Lithuanian Clerical Society and participated in the dissemination of illegal Lithuanian press.

Around 1898–1899, Mickevičius tutored at Sakalai, a Lithuanian school run by Povilas Višinskis. Since 1888, he was an active Varpininkas – a member of the patriotic organization, named after Varpas newspaper, aimed at raising Lithuanian consciousness and promoting education, and the Lithuanian language and culture. Mickevičius was contributing to Varpas and Ūkininkas. Mickevičius chose the pen name Kapsukas, a diminutive version of Vincas Kapsas, one of the pen names of Vincas Kudirka, founder of Varpas.

In 1900, Mickevičius was admitted to Jelgava Gymnasium. In 1901, he was expelled for storing illegal Lithuanian press and belonging to yet another Lithuanian book smuggling society, Kūdikis. A secret police search at his home produced a large amount of illegal Lithuanian literature. Mickevičius was indicted in a political case for anti-tsarist activities. To avoid arrest, he escaped via East Prussia to Switzerland.

=== Social democrat and imprisonment ===
Kapsukas as gymnasium student

From 1901 to 1903, Mickevičius studied philosophy, sociology, and political economy at the University of Bern in Switzerland. Around the same time (1902–1903), he became a co-editor of Varpas and the editor of Ūkininkas in Tilsit. During his stay in Tilsit, Mickevičius gained access to the Printing House archives and published historic materials from the Auszra days, and materials pertaining to the founding of Varpas. In 1902, the Varpininkai Congress founded the Lithuanian Democratic Party (LDP). Mickevičius became one of its first members.

By 1903, Mickevičius felt that the LDP did not go far enough in its political goals. The LDP sought autonomy within Russia as opposed to full independence. They also did not adequately address social issues. In 1903, he left the LDP and joined the Lithuanian Social Democratic Party (LSDP). Mickevičius was not willing to sever his ties with the Varpininkai, however, and clashed with LSDP leadership (Augustinas Janulaitis), who did not want to cooperate with the Varpininkai. To bridge the gap between the LSDP and the Varpininkai, he founded the social-patriotic organization Draugas in 1904, although he still technically remained a member of the LSDP. After prolonged negotiations, in 1905, Draugas merged with the LSDP, and Mickevičius was elected a member of the Central Committee of the LSDP. He at that time belonged to the federalist wing of the LSDP, which promoted the idea of an independent Lithuania in a federation with Poland, Belarus, Ukraine, and Latvia (former territories of the Polish–Lithuanian Commonwealth). Russia was not part of their designs. The federalists fought with the autonomist wing of the LSDP, who promoted Lithuanian autonomy within Russia.

Around the same time (1904–1906), Mickevičius founded and edited magazines Draugas and Darbininkas. From 1906 to 1907, he also contributed to and edited Naujoji Gadynė and Skardas.

During the Revolution of 1905, Mickevičius organized anti-tsarist peasant demonstrations and strikes in Suvalkija and northern Lithuania. Mickevičius was briefly detained by authorities but, with no evidence against him, he managed to talk his way out. In December 1905, he was arrested under the name of J. Jaks-Tyris and convicted of revolutionary activities, but managed to escape from a prison hospital in Suwałki in 1906. He was arrested again in May 1907 and sentenced to 3 years for anti-tsarist activities. Among his defenders in the Suwałki court were attorneys Alexander Kerensky, who, after the 1917 February revolution, was the head of Russian government, and M. F. Volkenstein, who employed V. Ulyanov (Lenin) back in 1893. In 1909, after authorities discovered that Mickevičius was the same person who escaped from prison in 1906, he was sentenced to an additional 8 years of katorga. He did his time in the Vilnius, Suwałki, Warsaw, and Vladimir Prisons until 1913. In 1913, to commemorate the 300th anniversary of the Romanov Dynasty, Tsar Nicholas II decreed the amnesty for certain non-violent prisoners. Mickevičius, as a political prisoner of non-violent nature, was released from prison and exiled to the Yenisei region in Siberia.

In December 1913, Mickevičius escaped from the exile with fake documents. For several weeks in early 1914, he was in hiding in Latvia and Lithuania (count Nikolai Zubov offered him a hiding place in his Medemrodė estate, now in Agluonai village). There, he prepared for his emigration, and was authorized by Mykolas Biržiška to act abroad on behalf of the LSDP. With the help of local activists, Mickevičius crossed the border to Prussia and traveled to Austria with fake documents. In 1914, in Kraków, then part of the Austrian Grand Duchy of Cracow, he met Vladimir Lenin, the leader of the Bolshevik faction of the Russian Social Democratic Labour Party. In 1914, Mickevičius became a member of Vilnis editorial staff. He stayed in Kraków until the beginning of World War I, and then emigrated through Switzerland to Great Britain.

From 1914 to 1916, he lived in Great Britain. Mickevičius headed the LSDP chapter in Scotland. In 1915–1916, he edited Socialdemokratas and Rankpelnis in Bellshill, Scotland. In 1916, he left Great Britain for the United States, where he lived until 1917. He joined the American Lithuanian Socialist Union (ALSU) and took over management of all major left press. He edited left wing science and literature monthly magazine Naujoji Gadynė in Philadelphia and newspaper Kova.

=== Communist revolutionary ===
In 1917, after the Russian February Revolution, Mickevičius was no longer a fugitive. He arrived from the United States to Petrograd and joined the Russian Social Democratic Labor Party (Bolshevik) (RSDLP(b)). He became the editor of Lithuanian socialist (later communist) newspaper Tiesa. In August 1917, he participated in the 6th congress of RSDLP(b) in Petrograd and supported the creation of the Communist International (Comintern). After the October Revolution, Mickevičius served as the Commissar of the Soviet government for Lithuanian affairs, and was a member of the Central Bureau of the Lithuanian Sections under the Central Committee of the RSDLP(b), and then of the Russian Communist Party (Bolsheviks) (RCP(b)).

In late 1918, Mickevičius returned to Lithuania (then still occupied by Germany; see Ober Ost). Lithuania was contested by many as besides the Council of Lithuania that proclaimed independence on 16 February 1918, there were German, Polish, and Soviet forces. Expecting an occupation by the Soviet Red Army, pro-Communist groups such as the Lithuanian Social Democrats, Bolsheviks, Jewish Bundists, Socialist Revolutionaries, and more, began actively organizing in Vilnius and other Lithuanian towns.

In early October, the founding congress of the Communist Party of Lithuania took place in Vilnius. In December, elections were held for the Vilnius Soviet of Workers' Deputies, electing 96 communists, and their non-affiliated sympathizers, 60 Bund members, 22 Mensheviks, and 15 LSDP members (social democrats). On 8 December, the Vilnius Soviet formed the Provisional Revolutionary Workers' and Peasants' Government of Lithuania. Mickevičius was elected the new government's chairman (Prime Minister) and the Minister of Foreign Affairs. On 16 December, the Mickevičius government issued a manifesto, in which they dismissed German occupational administration and proclaimed the Lithuanian Soviet Socialist Republic.

German occupying forces were still stationed in Vilnius, but started leaving in late December 1918, while the Red Army attacked westward trying to seize as many of the lands lost by the Treaty of Brest-Litovsk. On 2 January 1919, the Polish Committee forces (Self-Defence of Lithuania and Belarus) took control over Vilnius. The Council of Lithuania withdrew to Kaunas the same day. The Red Army entered Vilnius on 5 January, and the Mickevičius government reestablished its control.

On 27 February 1919, the Lithuanian SSR and Socialist Soviet Republic of Byelorussia (created on 1 January) were merged and the Socialist Soviet Republic of Lithuania and Belorussia (Litbel) was formed. Mickevičius served as the chairman and Minister of Foreign Affairs of the Litbel government. Poland pushed back against the Red Army in the Polish–Soviet War, while the newly established Lithuanian Army was liberating previously Communist-occupied parts of Lithuania, so that by August 1919, almost all of Lithuania and Belarus was freed from the Soviets. In July 1920, the Soviet–Lithuanian Peace Treaty was concluded, and the Lithuanian Soviet Socialist Republic ceased to exist.

The support for Mickevičius' government mostly came from the city proletariat and farm laborers. Lithuanian farmers mostly supported the Council of Lithuania, who promised land to those who cultivate it. In an agrarian country, as Lithuania was at that time, farmers' support was essential. Understanding his limited support base, Mickevičius resisted Lenin's demands to recruit more Lithuanians to the Red Army and reported to Lenin that such an effort would be counter-productive and would reduce Lithuanian support for his government.

=== Later life ===
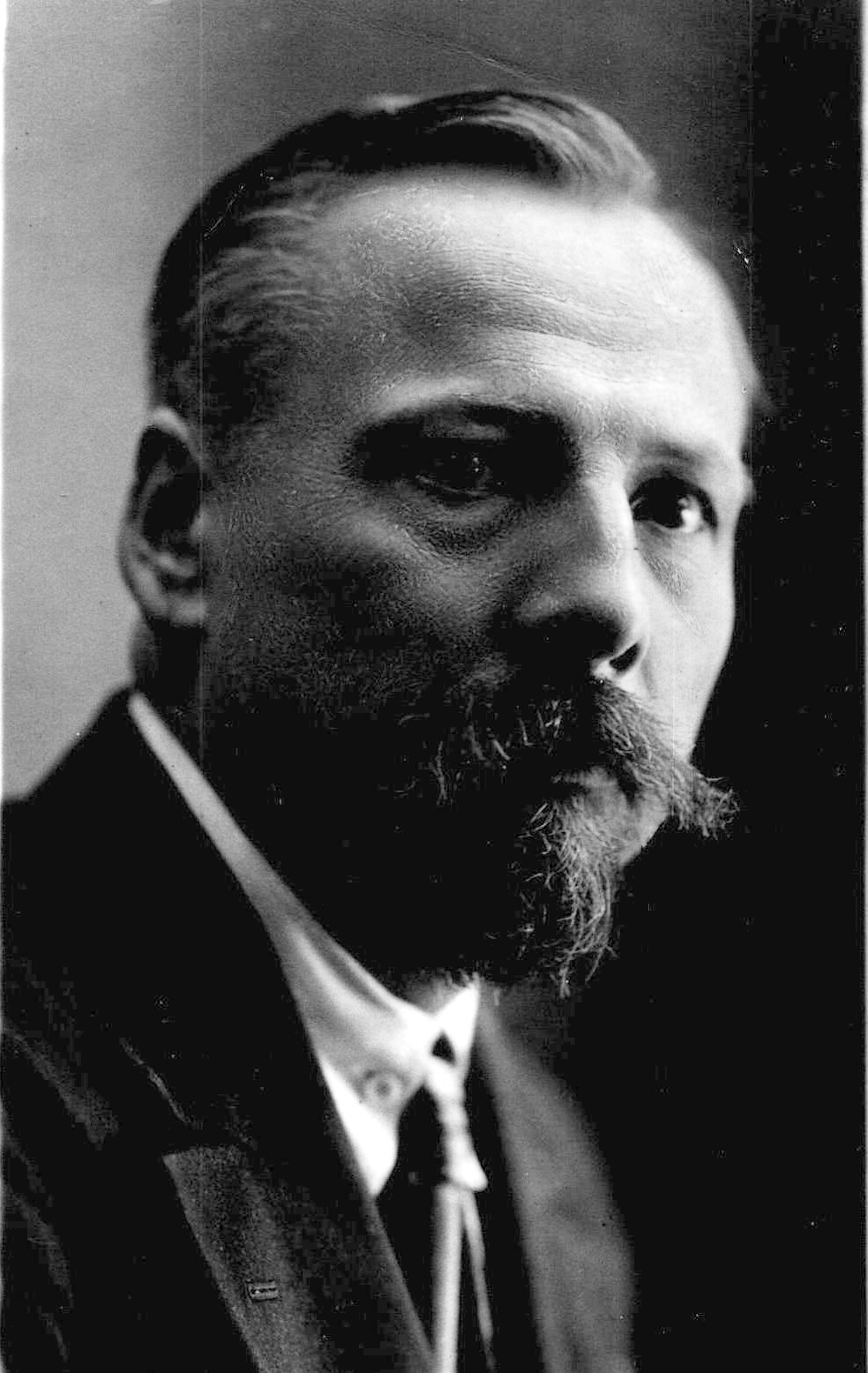
Kapsukas in the 1930s

From late 1921 until the end of his life in 1935, Mickevičius lived in Moscow. He was a delegate to the Second through Sixth Congresses of the Comintern. Working on the executive committee of the Comintern from 1923 to 1935, he became a candidate member of the executive committee of the Comintern in 1924, and a member in 1928. Kapsukas was a delegate to the Eleventh, Twelfth, and Fourteenth through Seventeenth RCP(b) Congresses. He was elected a candidate member of the Central Committee of the RCP(b) at the Eighth Congress (1919).

From 1921 until 1935, Mickevičius was on the editorial board of Lithuanian communist periodicals Tiesa, Kibirkstis, Balsas, Komunaras, and Komunistas.

Kapsukas died on 17 February 1935 in a hospital in Moscow. The official report listed the cause of death as the complications from tuberculosis. His wife, Elena Domicėlė Tautkaitė, was executed in 1937 for "Trotskyist activities", and their three children were adopted and taken home by their maternal aunt.

== Political views and personality ==
Mickevičius is a case study of gradual drift from social-patriotic nationalist to Marxist internationalist. His early views were greatly influenced by his patriotic family and by the Lithuanian National Revival. The leaders of this movement came mostly from emancipated peasants. Their Lithuanian origin and relatively weak Polonization were responsible for the nationalist character of this movement, while their peasant roots shaped the social program. Many social ideas were carried over from the January Uprising of 1863. Therefore, many future social democrats belonged to the Lithuanian National Revival. Vincas Kudirka was a member of the Proletariat Party and was arrested when he was helping re-print Marx's Das Kapital, and Mickevičius called himself a social-patriot.

During the 1905 revolution, Mickevičius dedicated all his energy to fighting for a free Lithuania. He already saw the freedom of Lithuania through the glasses of social justice. To him, social justice, human dignity, and individual freedom were more important than national independence. According to writer Ona Pleirytė-Puidienė, a witness of the 1905 revolution,

Kapsukas was literally the social democratic party's and Lithuanian idea's martyr. Always breathless, hungry, without real shelter he travelled across Lithuania spreading national awareness and enlightenment. Of course, social democratic voices mattered most to him, but he also passionately loved his Lithuania.

During his prison years (1907–1914), Mickevičius read works of Marx, Kautsky, Plekhanov and other Marxists, and his views drifted profoundly toward Marxism. Later in exile and emigration, he met Yakov Sverdlov, Vladimir Lenin, Nikolai Bukharin, and Leon Trotsky, who also influenced his views. By 1918, he considered himself a Marxist. However, until his last days, Mickevičius venerated his mentor Vincas Kudirka and retained deep respect for Povilas Višinskis. According to Juozas Tumas-Vaižgantas, Bolsheviks knew that, for him, Lithuania mattered more than narrow party directives:

The same [attitude] could be noticed through his entire communist activities in Vilnius: he cared about Lithuania not in a communist way. Everybody felt that, even his fellow Bolsheviks.

== Personal life ==
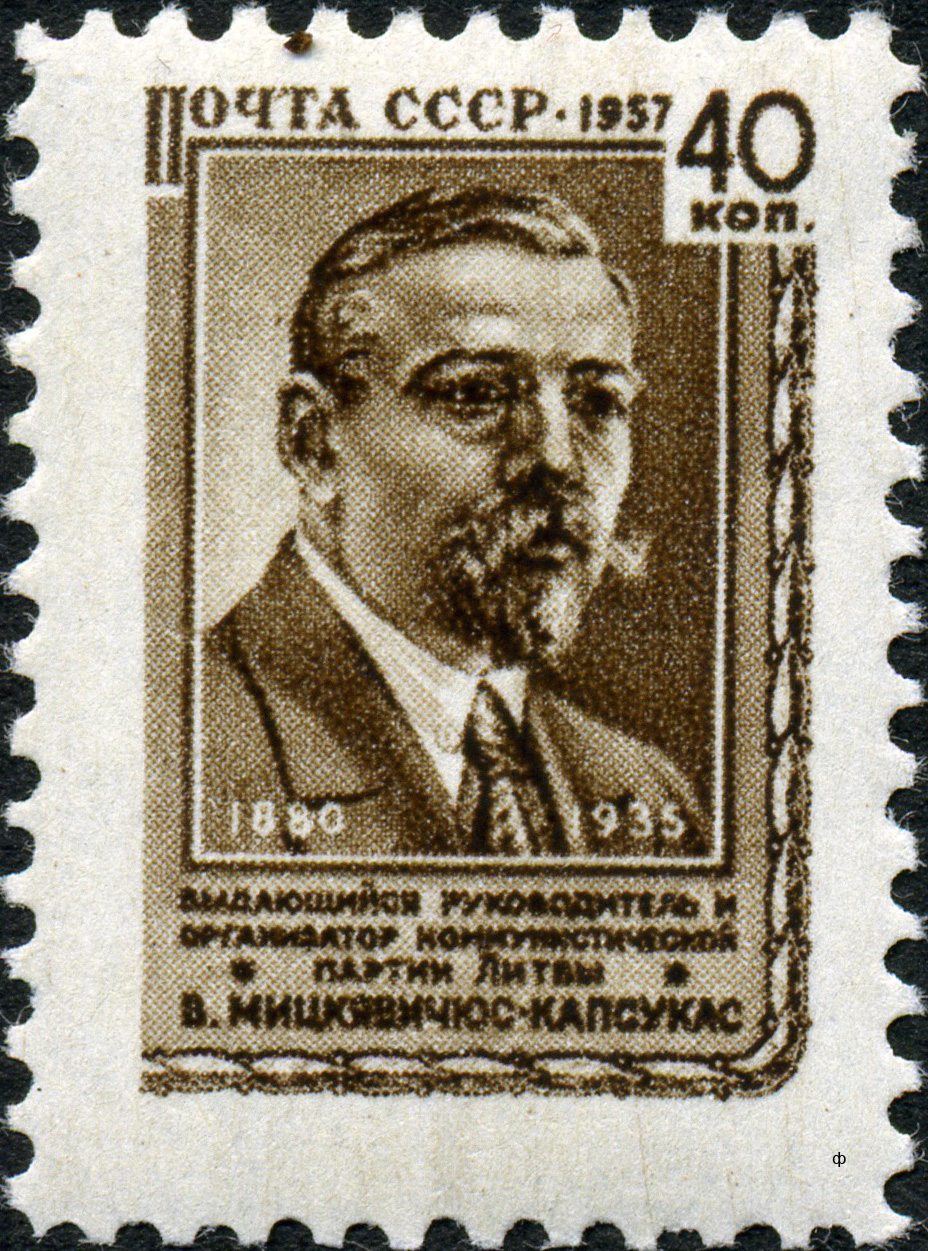
Postage stamp of the USSR with a portrait of Vincas Mickevičius-Kapsukas

His father, Simonas (Simas) Mickevičius (1830–1915), was a wealthy farmer. From his first marriage to Barbora Kriaučiūnaitė (c. 1840–1870), Simonas had a daughter, Konstancija Mickevičiūtė. With Ona Kuršėnaitė (c. 1850–1934), his second wife, Simonas had two sons: Juozapas (1872–1950) and Vincas.

Vincas Mickevičius married Vanda Didžiulytė (1881–1941) in 1901 in Mintauja (now Jelgava, Latvia). They divorced in 1913 after the death of their daughter Vanda. He married Elena Domicėlė Tautkaitė (1893–1937) in 1922 in Moscow, Russia. They had three children: Jūra Mickevičiūtė (1921–2008), Vincas Mickevičius (1925–2014), and Lena Mickevičiūtė (1927–2001).

== Legacy ==
Vincas Mickevičius-Kapsukas was the author of more than 50 works on politics, history, philosophy, and literature, and around 2000 articles. He also wrote memoirs, essays, and short stories.

Between 1937 and 1953, Mickevičius was on Stalin's "gray list," not officially an "enemy of state," but not to be mentioned in public. After Stalin's death in 1953, the communist government of Lithuania, especially the first secretary of the Lithuanian Communist Party, Antanas Sniečkus, started reviving the memory of Mickevičius. Gradually, the commemoration of Mickevičius' legacy grew to the point of idolization. Streets, squares, museums, and ships were named after him, and several monuments were erected.

=== Named after Vincas Mickevičius-Kapsukas ===
- 1955–1989: Marijampolė city and region
- 1956–1989: Vilnius University
- 1964–1989: Award of the Lithuanian Journalists Union

== Bibliography ==
- Lietuvos buržuazijos stiprėjimas ir jos reikalų reiškėjai, 1914
- J. Biliūno biografija, 1917
- Lietuvos Bresto taikos derybos, 1918
- Trumpa LSDP istorija, 2 d., 1918–1920
- 1905 m. revoliucija Lietuvoje, 1926
- Pirmoji Gegužės nepriklausomoje Lietuvoje, 1919–1920
- Keturių teismo komedija ir paskutinės valandos, 1929
- Caro kalėjimuos, 1929; 1975
- Lietuva, 1931
- Pirmoji Lietuvos proletarinė revoliucija ir Tarybų valdžia, 1934; 1958
- Raštai, t. 1–10 (Works, vols. 1–10), Vilnius, 1960–1971
