= Yitzhak Weinstein-Branovsky =

Bolshevik revolutionary (1888–1938)

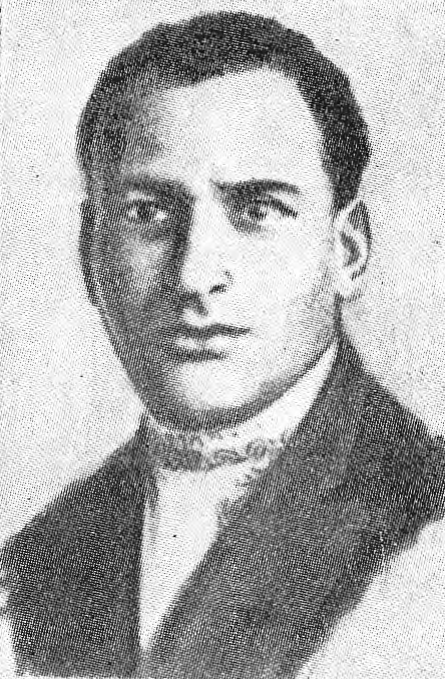
Yitzhak Weinstein-Branovsky

Yitzhak Weinstein-Branovsky (Lithuanian: Aizikas Vainšteinas-Branovskis, Russian: Айзик Вайнштейн-Брановский, Polish: Ajzik Wajnsztajn-Branowski; 1888–1938) was a Bolshevik revolutionary. He served as a senior government official in the Lithuanian Soviet Republic and the Lithuanian–Belorussian Soviet Republic, serving as a People's Commissar in both republics in 1918–1919.

== From Bundist to Bolshevik ==
Weinstein, who would later acquire the party name 'Branovsky', was born in 1888 in Odessa. He was a member of the General Jewish Labour Bund in Lithuania, Poland and Russia. He joined the Russian Social Democratic Labour Party (Bolsheviks) in 1917. Prior to 1917, Weinstein-Branovsky participated in the Jewish worker movement in Ukraine.

== Soviet Lithuania ==
In the wake of the November 1918 Revolution in Germany, some 40 cadres, including Weinstein-Branovsky, were sent from Soviet Russia into Lithuania to organize revolutionary activities between mid-November and mid-December 1918. The Central Bureau the Jewish Sections of the Russian Communist Party (Bolsheviks) dispatched Weinstein-Branovsky, Semyon Dimanstein and Y. Shimelevich to Lithuania. Weinstein-Branovsky was named People's Commissar for Trade and Industry in the Provisional Revolutionary Worker-Peasant Government of Lithuania. On January 10, 1919, the Central Committee of the Communist Party of Lithuania and Belorussia voted to expand its ranks by giving Weinstein-Branovsky and four others membership in the Central Committee. The First Congress of Soviets of Lithuania, held in Vilnius on February 18–20, 1919, elected Weinstein-Branovsky as member of the Central Executive Committee of Soviets of Lithuania.

== Lithuanian-Belorussian Soviet Republic ==
When the Socialist Soviet Republic of Lithuania and Belorussia was founded on February 27, 1919, Weinstein-Branovsky was named People's Commissar for Finance of the new republic. On April 29, 1919, the Central Committee of the Communist Party of Lithuania and Belorussia decided to reorganize the Lithuanian–Belorussian Soviet government, and Weinstein-Branovsky was named as the new People's Commissar for Justice. In the midst of the Polish–Soviet War, in which the Lithuanian–Belorussian Soviet Republic had lost its capital Vilnius and much of its claimed territory, the Defense Council of the republic sent Weinstein-Branovsky, Pranas Eidukevičius and Gabrielius Liutkevičius to Utena, to supervise the activities of local soviet authorities and organize mobilization of militia activities. Weinstein-Branovsky and Eidukevičius set up new revolutionary committees in nearby Anykščiai, Debeikiai, Vyžuonos, Užpaliai and Tauragnai, and organized a local militia force in the area.

== Later life and death ==
After 1919, Weinstein-Branovsky worked in communist party structures in Kharkiv and Moscow.

Weinstein-Branovsky died in 1938. He was posthumously rehabilitated after the 20th Congress of the Communist Party of the Soviet Union in 1956. Tarybų Lietuvos enciklopedija, a Soviet encyclopedia, provided different information about his death. According to the encyclopedia, he died while fighting German forces in the Battle of Moscow in 1941.
