= Names of Lithuanian places in other languages =

This page lists some names of places in Lithuania, as they are called in Lithuanian, and as they are called or were formerly called in other languages spoken by ethnic groups. Which are or have been represented within Lithuanian territory.

== Cities ==
Lithuanian	Polish	Russian	Belarusian (Cyrillic)	Belarusian (Łacinka)	Yiddish	German	Latvian
Akmenė	Okmiany	Окмяны/ Okmiany	Акмяны	Akmiany	אַקמיאַן/Akmian	Akmenen	Akmene
Alytus	Olita	Олита/ Olita	Аліта	Alita	אַליטע/Alite	Olita, Alitten	Alīta
Anykščiai	Onikszty	Они́кшты/ Onikšty	Ані́кшты	Anikšty	אַניקשט/Aniksht	Onikschten	Anīkšči
Ariogala	Ejragoła	Эйрагола/ Ejragola	Эйрагола	Ejrahoła	אייראַגאָלע/Eyragole	Hoyragel	Arjogala
Baltoji Vokė	Biała Waka	Белая Вака/ Belaja Vaka	Бела Вака	Bieła Vaka		Weisswacke	Baltoji Voķe
Birštonas	Birsztany	Бирштаны/ Birštany	Біршта́ны	Birštany	בירשטאן/Birshtan	Birschtannen	Birštona
Biržai	Birże	Биржи/ Birži	Біржы	Biržy	בירז/Birz	Birsen	Birži
Daugai	Daugi	Дауги/ Daugi	Даўгi	Daŭhi	דויג/Doig	Daugen	Daugi
Druskininkai	Druskieniki	Друскеники/ Druskeniki	Друске́нікі	Druskieniki	דרוסקאניק/Druskanik	Druscheniken	Druskininki
Dusetos	Dusiaty	Дусяты/ Dusiaty	Дусяты	Dusiaty	דוסיאַט/Dusiat	Dustädt	Dusetas
Dūkštas	Dukszty	Дукшты/ Dukšty	Дукшты	Dukšty	דוקשט/Duksht	Dukschten	Dūkšta
Eišiškės	Ejszyszki	Эйши́шки/ Ejšiški	Эйшы́шкі	Ejšyški	אײשישאׇק/Eyshishok	Eiksiskendorf	Eišišķes
Elektrėnai	Elektreny	Электре́ны/ Elektreny	Электрэны	Elektreny			Elektrēnipomp
Ežerėlis	Ażarele	Ажарeле /Ažarele	Ажарэле	Ažarele		Kalanken	Ežerēle
Gargždai	Gorżdy	Горжды/ Gorždy	Го́ржды	Horždy	גורזד/Gorzhd	Garsden	Gargždi
Garliava	Godlewo	Годлево/ Godlevo	Гадле́ва	Gadleva	גודלעװע/Gudleve	Goddlau	Garļava
Gelgaudiškis	Giełgudyszki	Гельгудишки/ Gel'gudiški	Гелгудышкі	Hiełhudyški	גלגודישק/Gelgudishk	Gelgudischken	Ģelgaudišķi
Grigiškės	Grzegorzewo	Григорьево/ Grigorjevo	Грэгарава	Hreharava			Griģišķes
Ignalina	Ignalino	Игнали́на/ Ignalina	Ігналі́на	Ihnalina	אינגעלינע/Ingeline	Ingelin	
Jieznas	Jezno	Езно/ Jezno	Езна	Jezna	יעזנע/Yiezne	Jessen	
Jonava	Janów nad Wilią	Яново/ Janovo	Я́нава	Janava	יאנעווע/Yaneve	Janowo	Jonava
Joniškis	Janiszki	Янишки/ Janiški	Яні́шкі	Janiški	יאנישאק/Yanishok	Jonischken	Jonišķi
Joniškėlis	Johaniszkiele	Иоганишкели/ Ioganiškeli	Янiшкеле	Janiškiele	יאַנישקעל/Yonishkel	Johanischkehl	
Jurbarkas	Jurbork	Юрбург/ Jurburg	Юрбург	Jurburh	יורבורג/Yurburg	Georgenburg	Jurbarka
Kaišiadorys	Koszedary	Кошедары/ Košedary	Кашада́ры	Kašadary	קאשעדאר/Koshedar	Koschedary	Kaišadore
Kalvarija	Kalwaria	Кальва́рия/ Kal'varija	Кальва́рыя	Kalvaryja	קאַלװאַריִע/Kalvarye	Kalwarien	
Kaunas	Kowno	Ковно/ Kovno, Ковна/ Kovna	Ко́ўна	Koŭna	קאָװנע/Kovne	Kauen	Kauņa
Kavarskas	Kowarsk	Ковaрcк/ Kovarsk	Кaвaрcк	Kavarsk	קאָװארסק/Kovarsk	Kawarsk	Kavarska
Kazlų Rūda	Kozłowa Ruda	Козлова Руда/ Kozlova Ruda	Казло́ва Ру́да	Kazłova Ruda	קאזלובע רודע/Kozlove Rude	Koselrode	
Kėdainiai	Kiejdany	Кейданы/ Kejdany	Кейда́ны	Kiejdany	קיידאן/Keidan	Kedahnen	Ķēdaiņi
Kelmė	Kielmy	Кельмы/ Kelmy	Ке́льмы	Kielmy	קעלם/Kelm	Kelm	Ķelme
Klaipėda	Kłajpeda	Клайпеда/ Klajpeda	Кла́йпеда	Kłajpieda	מעמעל/Memel	Memel	Klaipēda
Kretinga	Kretynga	Кретинген/ Kretingen	Крэтынга	Kretynha	קרעטינגע/Kretinge	Krottingen	Kretinga
Kudirkos Naumiestis	Władysławów	Владиславов/ Vladislavov	Уладзіславаў	Uładzisłavaŭ	נײַשטאָט־שאַקי/Nayshtot-Shaki	Neustadt-Scherwindt	
Kupiškis	Kupiszki	Купишки/ Kupiški	Купі́шкі	Kupiški	קופּישאָק/Kupishok	Kupischki	
Kybartai	Kibarty	Кибoрты/ Kiborty	Кіба́рты	Kibarty	קיבאַרט/Kibort	Kibarten	
Kuršėnai	Kurszany	Куршаны/ Kuršany	Куршаны	Kuršany	קורשאן/Kurshan	Kurschenen	Kuršēni
Lazdijai	Łożdzieje	Лодзее/ Lodzeje	Лазьдзея	Łaźdzeja	לאדזדיי/Lazdei	Lasdien	Lazdiji
Lentvaris	Landwarów	Ландварово/ Landvarovo	Ляндварова	Landvarova	לאנדוועראווע/Landverove	Landwerau	Lentvare
Linkuva	Linków	Линково/ Linkovo	Лiнкaў	Linkaŭ	לינקעװע/Linkeve	Linkuva	
Marijampolė	Mariampol	Марья́мполь/ Marjampol'	Мар’я́мпаль	Marjampal	מאריאמפאל/Mariampol	Mariampol	Marijampole
Mažeikiai	Możejki	Можейки/ Možejki	Мажэ́йкі	Mažejki	מאזשייק/Mazheik	Moscheiken	Mažeiķi
Molėtai	Malaty	Маляты/ Maliaty	Маля́ты	Malaty	מאַליאַט/Maliat	Mulau	Moleti
Naujoji Akmenė	Nowe Okmiany	Новые Окмяны/ Novyje Okmiany	Новыя Акмяны	Novyja Akmiany	נובע אקמעיאן/Nove Akmian	Neu Akmenen	Naujoji Akmene
Nemenčinė	Niemenczyn	Неме́нчин/ Nemenčin	Неменчын	Nemienčyn	נעמענטשין/Nementchin	Nementschine	
Neringa	Nerynga	Неринга/ Neringa	Неры́нга	Nerynha	נערינגע/Neringe		Neringa
Pabradė	Podbrodzie	Побродзье/ Podbrodzje	Падбро́дзe	Padbrodzie	פאדבראדז/Podbrodz	Odbrodsen	Pabrade
Pagėgiai	Pojegi	Пoге́ги/ Pogegi	Паге́гі	Pahiehi	פאגעג/Pogeg	Pogegen	
Pakruojis	Pokrój	Пoкро́й/ Pokroj	Пакро́й	Pakroj	פּאָקראָי/Pokroi	Pokroy	
Palanga	Połąga	Паланга/ Palanga	Паланга	Pałanha	פאלאנגען/Polangen	Polangen	Palanga
Pandėlys	Pondele	Понедель/ Ponedel'	Пaнядзель	Paniadziel	פּאָנעדעל/Ponedel	Ponedellen	
Panemunė	Poniemuń	Понемонь/ Ponemon'	Пaнямaнь	Paniamań	פּאַנעמון/Panemun	Übermemel	Panemune
Panevėžys	Poniewież	Поневе́ж/ Ponevež	Паняве́ж	Paniaviež	פאנעוועזש/Ponevezsh	Ponewiesch	Paņevēža
Pasvalys	Pozwoł	Посволь/ Posvol	По́сваль	Posval	פּאָסװאָל/Posvol	Pasewalk	Pasvale
Plungė	Płungiany	Плунгя́ны/ Plungiany	Плунгя́ны	Płunhiany	פלונגיאן/Plungian	Plungen	Pluņģe
Priekulė	Prekule	Приекуле/ Prijekule	Прыекуле	Pryjekule		Prökuls	Priekule
Prienai	Preny	Прены/ Preny	Прэ́ны	Preny	פרען/Pren	Preny	Prieni
Radviliškis	Radziwiliszki	Pадзивилишки/ Radziviliški	Радзівілі́шкі	Radziviliški	ראַדווילישאָק/Radzivilishok	Radwilischken	Radvilišķi
Ramygala	Remigoła	Ремигола/ Remigola	Рэмігола	Remihoła	רעמיגאָלע/Remigole	Remgallen	Ramīgala
Raseiniai	Rosienie	Россиены/ Rossijeny	Расе́ны	Rasieny	ראסיין/Rasayn	Rossieny	Raseiņi
Rietavas	Retów/Retowo	Ретово/ Retovo	Рэ́таў	Retaŭ	ריטעווע/Riteve	Redau	Rietava
Rokiškis	Rokiszki	Ракишки/ Rakiški	Ракі́шкі	Rakiški	ראקישאק/Rakishok	Rokischken	Rokišķi
Rūdiškės	Rudziszki	Рудишки/ Rudiški	Рудзі́шкі	Rudziški	רודישאק/Rudishok		Rūdišķes
Šakiai	Szaki	Ша́ки/ Šaki	Ша́кі	Šaki	שאַקי/Shaki	Schaken	Šaķi
Salantai	Sałanty	Саланты/ Salanty	Саланты	Sałanty	סאַלאַנט/Salant	Gränishof	Salanti
Šalčininkai	Soleczniki (Wielkie)	(Великие) Солечники/ Solečniki	(Вялікія) Салечні́кі	(Vialikija) Salečniki	סאָלעטשניק/Soletchnik	Sassenicken	Šaļčininki
Seda	Siady	Сяды/ Siady	Сяды	Siady	סיאַד/Syad	Schwenden	Seda
Šeduva	Szadów	Шадов/ Šadov	Шадаў	Šadaŭ	שאַדעווע/Shadeve	Scheddau	Šeduva
Šiauliai	Szawle	Шавли/ Šavli	Шаўлі	Šaŭli	שאַװל/Shavel	Schaulen	Šauļi
Šilalė	Szyłele	Шилели/ Šileli	Шылэ́ле	Šyłele	שילעל/Shilel	Schillehlen	Šilale
Šilutė	Szyłokarczma	Шилокарчема/ Šilokarčema	Шылакарчма́	Šyłakarčma	היידעקרוג/Haidekrug	Heydekrug	Šilute
Simnas	Simno	Симно/ Simno	Сімнa	Simna	סימנע/Simne	Simnen	Simna
Širvintos	Szyrwinty	Ширвинты/ Širvinty	Шырвінты	Šyrvinty	שירווינט/Shirvint	Schirwindt	Širvintas
Skaudvilė	Skaudwile	Скaдвилe/ Skadvile	Скaдвiлe	Skadvile	שקודוויל/Shkodvil	Skaudwill	Skaudvile
Skuodas	Szkudy	Шкуды/ Škudy	Шку́ды	Škudy	שקוד/Shkod	Schoden	Skoda
Smalininkai	Smolniki	Смольники/ Smol'niki	Смольнiкi	Smolniki	סמאלינינק/Smalinink	Schmalleningken	Smalininki
Subačius	Subocz	Субoч/ Suboč	Субoч	Suboč	סובאָטש/Subotch	Subotschen	Subačus
Švenčionėliai	Nowe Święciany	Новые Свенцяны/ Novyje Svenciany	Новыя Сьвянця́ны	Novyja Śvianciany	נובע סווענציאן/Nove Sventzion	Neuschwintzen	Švenčonēļi
Švenčionys	Święciany	Свенцяны/ Svenciany	Сьвянця́ны	Śvianciany	סווענציאן/Sventzion	Schwintzen	Švenčoņi
Tauragė	Taurogi	Таурогген/ Tauroggen	Таўро́гі	Taŭrohi	טאווריק/Tovrik	Tauroggen	Tauraģe
Telšiai	Telsze	Тельши/ Tel'ši	Цяльшы́	Cialšy	טעלז/Telzh	Telsche	Telši
Trakai	(Nowe) Troki	Троки/ Troki	Тро́кі	Troki	טראק/Trok	Traken	Traķi
Troškūnai	Traszkuny	Трaшкуны/ Traškuny	Трaшкуны	Traškuny	טראשקון/Trashkun	Traschkin	Troškūni
Tytuvėnai	Cytowiany	Цитованы/ Citovany	Цiтaваны	Citavany	ציטאוואן/Tzitovan	Titowenen	Tītuvēni
Ukmergė	Wiłkomierz	Вилькомир/ Vil'komir	Вількамі́р	Vilkamir	ווילקאמיר/Vilkomir	Wilkomir	Ukmerģe
Utena	Uciana	Уцяны/ Uciany	Уця́на	Uciana	אוטיאן/Utiyan	Utenen	Utena
Užventis	Użwenty	Ужвенты/ Užventy	Ужвенты	Užvienty	אוזוויאנט/Uzhvent	Uschwend	Užvente
Vabalninkas	Wobolniki	Вобольники/ Vobol'niki	Вaбольнiкi	Vabolniki	וואבאלניק/Vobolnik	Wobolnicken	
Varėna	Orany	Ораны/ Orany	Ара́ны	Arany	אראן/Aran	Warnen	Varēna
Varniai	Wernie	Ворне/ Vorne	Варні	Varni	ווארנע/Vorne	Wornen	
Veisiejai	Wiejsieje	Вейсей/ Vejsej	Вейсее	Viejsieje	ווישיי/Vishay	Wesehen	
Venta	Wenta	Вeнта/ Venta	Вэ́нта	Venta	ווענטע/Vente		
Viekšniai	Wieksznie	Вeкшне/ Vekšne	Вeкшнэ	Viekšne	וועקשנע/Vekshne	Wiekschnen	
Vievis	Jewie	Евье/ Jevje	Еўе	Jeŭje	וועוויע/Vevie	Wewien	
Vilkaviškis	Wyłkowyszki	Вилковишки/ Vilkoviški	Ваўкаві́шкі	Vaŭkaviški	ווילקאווישק/Vilkovishk	Wilkowischken	Vilkavišķi
Vilkija	Wilki	Вильки/ Vil'ki	Вiлькi	Vilki	ווילקי/Vilki	Memelburg	
Vilnius	Wilno	Вильна/ Vil'na, Вильно/ Vil'no	Вiльня	Vilnia	ווילנע/Vilne	Wilna	Viļņa
Virbalis	Wierzbołowo	Вержболово/ Veržbolovo	Вержбалава	Veržbałava	ווירבאלן/Virbaln	Wirballen	
Visaginas	Wisaginia	Висагиня/ Visaginia	Вісагі́ня	Visahinia			Visagina
Žagarė	Żagary	Жагоры/ Žagory	Жагоры	Žahory	זאגער/Zhager	Schagarren	Žagare
Zarasai	Jeziorosy	Новоалександровск/ Novoaleksandrovsk	Езяро́сы	Jeziarosy	עזערעני/Ezherene	Sarasen	Zarasi
Žiežmariai	Żyżmory	Жижмо́ры/ Žižmory	Жыжмо́ры	Žyžmory	זעזמער/Zezmer	Schismar	

== Towns ==
Lithuanian	Polish	Russian	Belarusian (Cyrillic)	Belarusian (Łacinka)	Yiddish	German
Adutiškis	Hoduciszki	Годутишки/ Godutishki	Гaдуцiшкi	Haduciški	הײַדוצישאָק/Haydutsishok	
Antalieptė	Antolepty	Антолепты/ Antolepty	Антaлепты	Antaliepty	אַנטאַליעפּט/Antalept	Antolepten
Aukštadvaris	Wysoki Dwór	Высокий Двор/ Vysokiy Dvor	Высокі Двор	Vysoki Dvor		Augstdwar, Rahden
Dieveniškės	Dziewieniszki	Девенишки/ Devenishki	Дзевянішкі	Dzievianiški		Dewinischek
Glitiškės	Glinciszki	Глинтишки/ Glintishki, Глитишки/ Glitishki				
Kaltanėnai	Kołtyniany	Колтыняны/ Koltynyany			קאָלטיניאַן/Koltinian	Koltenen, Medewage
Kaniūkai	Koniuchy	Конюхи/ Konyukhi				
Kretingalė	Krotynga					
Krikliniai	Kryklany					
Kriūkai	Kruki					
Krokialaukis	Krakopol					
Krosna	Krasna					
Kruonis	Kronie					
Kruopiai	Krupie					
Kuktiškės	Kukuciszki					
Kulautuva	Kołotowo					
Liškiava	Liszków	Лишково/ Lishkovo	Лiшкaў	Liškaŭ	לישקעווע/Lishkeve	Lischkau
Marcinkonys	Marcinkańce	Марцинканце/ Martsinkantse	Марцінканцы	Marcinkancy		
Mateikonys	Matejkany/Motejkany	Матейканы/ Mateykany				
Maišiagala	Mejszagoła	Мейшагола/ Meyshagola	Майшагола	Majšahoła		Masgallen
Medininkai	Miedniki Królewskie	Медники/ Medniki	Меднікі	Miedniki		Mednick
Mielagėnai	Mielegiany	Мелегяны/ Melegyany	Мелегяны	Mielehiany	מאליגאן/Meligan	Meligan
Merkinė	Merecz	Меречь/ Merech	Мерач	Mierač	מערעטש/Meretch	
Naujasis Daugėliškis	Daugieliszki Nowe				דאגאלישוק/Dogalishok	
Pilviškiai	Pilwiszki					
Raudondvaris	Czerwony Dwór	Красный Двор/ Krasny Dvor	Чырвоны Двор	Čyrvony Dvor		Rotenhof
Rimšė	Rymszany	Римшаны/ Rimshany	Рымшаны	Rymšany	רימשאן/Rimshan	Rimschen
Rumšiškės	Rumszyszki	Румшишки/ Rumshishki	Румшышкі	Rumšyški		Rumischen
Salakas	Sołoki	Солоки/ Soloki	Сaлокi	Saloki	סאַלאָק/Salok	Sallocken
Senieji Trakai	Stare Troki	Старые Троки/ Staryye Troki	Старыя Тро́кі	Staryja Troki		
Seredžius	Średniki	Средники/ Sredniki			סרעדניק/Srednik	Schrödnick
Šeteniai	Szetejnie	Шетейни/ Sheteyni				
Tauragnai	Tauroginie	Таврогины/ Tavroginy	Таўрaгiны	Taŭrahiny	טאָראָגין/Torogin	
Turmantas	Turmont	Турмонт/ Turmont	Турмонт	Turmont		
Valkininkai	Olkieniki					
Vepriai	Wieprze	Вепры/ Vepry	Вепры	Viepry		Weppren
Vištytis	Wisztyniec	Виштин/ Vishtin	Вышцін	Vyšcin	וישטינעץ/Vishtinetz	Wischtitten
Žasliai	Żośle	Жосли/ Zhosli	Жослi	Žosli	זאסלע/Zhosle	Schosellen

== Places in Vilnius ==
=== Elderates ===
Lithuanian	Polish	Russian	Belarusian (Cyrillic)	Belarusian (Łacinka)	Yiddish
Antakalnis	Antokol	Анто́коль/ Antokol	Анто́каль	Antokal	אנטאקאל/Antokol
Fabijoniškės	Fabianiszki	Фабиянишки/ Fabijaniški	Фабіёнішкі	Fabijoniški	
Grigiškės	Grzegorzewo	Григорьево/ Grigoryevo	Грэгарава	Hreharava	
Justiniškės	Justyniszki	Юстини́шки/ Justiniški	Юстынішкі	Justyniški	
Karoliniškės	Karolinki	Кароли́нишки/ Karolinishki	Каралінішкі	Karaliniški	
Lazdynai	Leszczyniaki	Лещиняки/Leščinjaki	Ляшчыны	Laščyny	
Naujamiestis	Nowe Miasto	Но́вый го́род/ Novyyi Gorod	Новае Места	Novaje Miesta	
Naujininkai	Nowy Świat	Новый Свет/ Novyyi Svet	Навінкі	Navinki	
Naujoji Vilnia	Nowa Wilejka	Ново-Вилейск/ Novo-Vileysk	Новая Вільня	Novaja Vilnia	
Paneriai	Ponary	Понары/ Ponary	Панары	Panary	פּאָנאַר/Ponar
Pašilaičiai	Poszyłajcie		Пашылайчы	Pašyłajčy	
Pilaitė	Zameczek		Замэчак	Zamečak	
Rasos	Rossa	Ро́сса/ Rossa	Росa	Rosa	
Senamiestis	Stare Miasto	Ста́рый го́род/ Staryyi Gorod	Старое Места	Staroje Miesta	
Užupis	Zarzecze	Заречье/ Zarechye	Зарэчча	Zarečča	
Verkiai	Werki	Верки/ Verki	Веркі	Vierki	
Vilkpėdė	Wilcza Łapa	Волчья Лапа/ Volchya Lapa	Воўчая Лапа	Voŭčaja Łapa	
Viršuliškės	Wierszuliszki	Виршулишки/ Virshulishki	Віршулішкі	Viršuliški	
Šeškinė	Szeszkinie	Шешки́не/ Sheshkine	Шышкі	Šyški	
Šnipiškės	Śnipiszki	(Кальварийские) Снипишки/ Snipishki	Сьнiпiшкi	Śnipiški	שניפּישאָק/Shnipishok
Žirmūnai	Żyrmuny	Жирму́ны/ Zhirmuny	Жырму́ны	Žyrmuny	
Žvėrynas	Zwierzyniec	Александрия/ Alexandriya	Зьвярынец	Źviaryniec	

=== Streets ===
Lithuanian	Polish	Russian pre-1918	Soviet Era
A. Jakšto	Dąbrowskiego	Херсонская	Komunarų
A. Stulginskio	Styczniowa	Лукишки	Komunarų
Amatų	zaułek Cechowy		
Antokolskio	Juliana Klaczki	Обжорный пер.	Stiklių
Aukštaičių	Kopanica	Копаница	Aukštaičių
Aušros Vartų	Ostrobramska	Большая	M. Gorkio
Barboros Radvilaitės	Królewska	Ботаническая	Pionierių
Benedektinių	Benedyktyńska	Проходной пер.	St. Žuko
Bernardinų	Zaułek Bernardyński	Замковый пер.	Pilies
Bokšto	Bakszta	Савича	Bokšto
Didžioji	Wielka	Большая Замковая	M. Gorkio
Dominikonų	Dominikańska	Благовещенская	Garelio
Gaono	Gaona	Дворцовая	Stiklių
Gedimino prospektas	Adama Mickiewicza	Георгиевский проспект	Lenino prospektas
Jogailos	Jagiellońska	Жандармский пер.	V. Kapsuko
Jono Basanavičiaus	Wielka Pohulanka	Погулянская	Basanavičiaus
K. Kalinausko	Mała Pohulanka	Погулянский пер.	K. Kalinausko
L.Stuokos-Gucevičiaus	Bonifraterska	Семёновская	L.Stuokos-Gucevičiaus
Liejyklos	Ludwisarska	Преображенская	Liejyklos
Literatų	zaułek Literacki	Покровская	Literatų
M. K. Čiurlionio	Zakrętowa	Закретная	M. K. Čiurlionio
Maironio	Sw. Anny	Александровская	Tiesos
Mėsinių	Jatkowa	Обжорный пер.	Mėsinių
Pamėnkalnio	Jasińskiego	Ярославская	P. Cvirkos
Pilies	Zamkowa	Большая Замковая	M. Gorkio
Pylimo	Zawalna	Завальная	Komjaunimo
Rusų	Metropolitana	Русская	Rusų
Savičiaus	Sawicza	Андреевская	Savičiaus
Skapo	Skopówka	Ско́повка	J. Tallat-Kelpšos skg.
Stiklių	Szklana	Игнатьевский переулoк	Stiklių
Strazdelio	Głuchy	Монастырский пер.	Strazdelio
Universiteto	Biskupia, Uniwersytecka	Епископская, Дворцовая, Университетская	Universiteto
Vilniaus	Wileńska	Вилейская	L. Giros
Vokiečių	Niemiecka	Немецкая	Muziejaus
Ševčenkos	Szeptyckiego		
Šv. Dvasios	Cerkiewna	Святодуховская	Birštono
Šv. Ignoto	Świętego Ignacego	Игнатьевский пер.	Giedrio
Šv. Jono	Świętojańska	Ивановская	B. Sruogos
Šv. Kazimiero	Świętokazimierzowski zaułek	Казарменный пер.	J. Vito
Šv. Mykolo	Świętomichalska	Михайловский	J. Biliūno
Šventaragio	Marji Magdaleny	Ботаническая	J. Janonio
Švitrigailos	Rydza-Śmigłego		
Žydų	Żydowska	Еврейская	Stiklių
Žygimantų	Zygmuntowska	Набережная	K. Požėlos

=== Squares ===
Lithuanian	Polish	Russian pre-1918	Soviet Era
Katedros aikštė	plac Katedralny	Кафедра́льная пло́щадь	площадь Гедимина/Gedimino aikštė
Lukiškių aikštė	plac Łukiski	Лукишки	площадь Ленина/Lenino aikštė
Rotušės aikštė	plac Ratuszowy	Ра́тушная пло́щадь	Музейная площадь/Muziejaus aikštė

== Elderates of Kaunas ==
Lithuanian	Polish	Russian	Belarusian (Cyrillic)	Belarusian (Łacinka)	Yiddish
Aleksotas	Aleksota	Алексота/ Aleksota			אַלעקסאָט/Aleksat
Centras	Śródmieście	Центр/ Tsentr			
Dainava	Dainów	Дайново/ Dainovo			
Eiguliai	Ajgule	Айгули/ Aiguli			
Gričiupis	Grynczupie				
Panemunė	Poniemuń	Понемонь/ Ponemon			
Petrašiūnai	Pietraszuny	Петрашуны/ Petrašuny			פעטראסון/Petrasun
Šančiai	Szańce	Шанцы/ Šancy			
Šilainiai					
Vilijampolė	Wiliampol (Słobódka)	Слободка/ Slobodka	Слабодка	Słabodka	סלאבאדקע/Slobodka
Žaliakalnis	Zielona Góra				

== Rivers ==
Lithuanian	Polish	Russian	Belarusian (Cyrillic)	Belarusian (Łacinka)	Yiddish	German	Latvian
Bartuva	Bartów	Бартов/ Bartov					Bārta
Dubysa	Dubissa	Дуби́са/ Dubisa	Дубiса	Dubisa		Dubissa	
Dysna	Dzisna	Дисна/ Disna	Дзісна	Dzisna			Dzisna
Merkys	Merczanka	Мерычанка/ Merychanka	Мерычанка	Mieryčanka			
Nemunas	Niemen	Не́ман/ Neman	Нёман	Nioman		Memel	Nemuna
Nevėžis	Niewiaża	Невяза/ Nevyaza	Невяза	Nieviaza			Nevēža
Neris	Wilia	Ви́лия/ Viliya	Вяльля́	Vialla			Nere
Šešupė	Szeszupa	Шешупа/ Sheshupa	Шышупа	Šyšupa		Scheschuppe	Šešupe
Vilnia, Vilnelė	Wilejka	Вилейка/Vileyka	Ві́льня	Vilnia		Vilnele	
Žeimena	Żejmiana	Жеймяна/Zheymyana					

== See also ==
- History of Lithuania
- Ethnic minorities in Lithuania
- Jews in Lithuania
- Polish minority in Lithuania
- Russian minority in Lithuania
- Names of Belarusian places in other languages

== Bibliography ==
- Słownik geograficzny Królestwa Polskiego i innych krajów słowiańskich, Tom IV (in Polish). Warszawa. 1883.
- Słownik geograficzny Królestwa Polskiego i innych krajów słowiańskich, Tom VI (in Polish). Warszawa. 1885.
- Słownik geograficzny Królestwa Polskiego i innych krajów słowiańskich, Tom IX (in Polish). Warszawa. 1888.
- Słownik geograficzny Królestwa Polskiego i innych krajów słowiańskich, Tom X (in Polish). Warszawa. 1889.
