= Tauragnai Eldership =

Eldership of Lithuania

The Tauragnai Eldership (Lithuanian: Tauragnų seniūnija) is an eldership of Lithuania, located in the Utena District Municipality. In 2021 its population was 997.
