= Daugailiai Eldership =

Eldership of Lithuania

The Daugailiai Eldership (Lithuanian: Daugailių seniūnija) is an eldership of Lithuania, located in the Utena District Municipality. In 2021 its population was 1139.
