= Vyžuoniai Eldership =

Eldership of Lithuania

The Vyžuoniai Eldership (Lithuanian: Vyžuonų seniūnija) is an eldership of Lithuania, located in the Utena District Municipality. In 2021 its population was 1303.
