= Sudeikiai Eldership =

Eldership of Lithuania

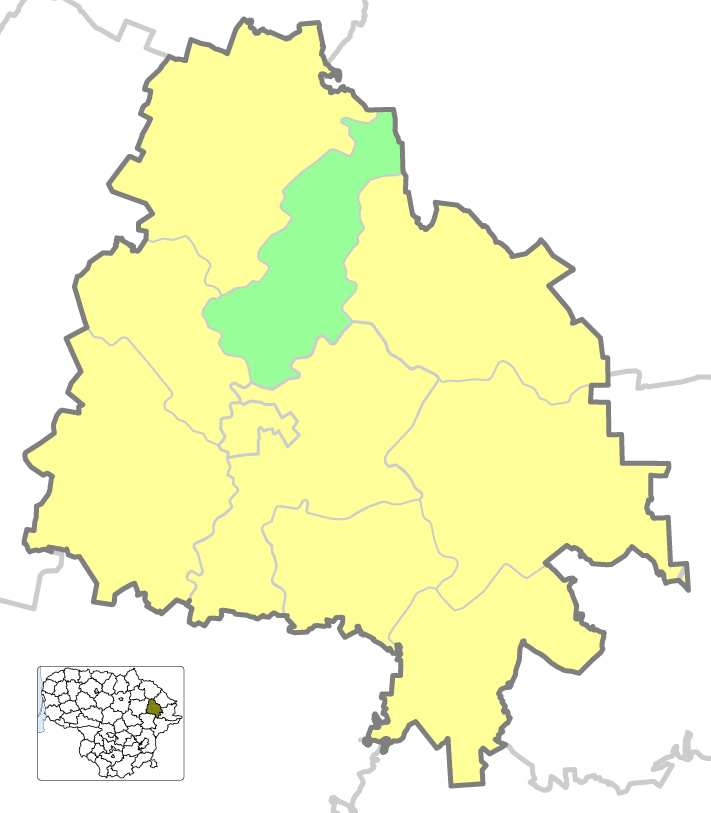
Location of Sudeikiai Eldership in Utena District Municipality

The Sudeikiai Eldership (Lithuanian: Sudeikių seniūnija) is an eldership of Lithuania, located in the Utena District Municipality. In 2021 its population was 1213.
