= Degsnys Manor =

Manor house in Utena District, Lithuania

Coordinates: 55°35′36″N 25°44′44″E

Degsnys Manor is a former residential manor in Degsnys village, Utena District Municipality, Lithuania.

== History ==
The first recorded hostels of the estate were Kozielos-Poklevskie ( Polish -Koziel-Poklewski ) - it is said that they lived here from the time of Ivan Rusytsia (1530–1584), only after having accepted Catholicism.

1872 m. Kozielos seized the Novy residence near Toleikiai village. Farmers drove a new host, but the gentlemen called the genders.

1882 m. In the summer, the peasants were subdued in the manor - they refused to go to the manor to go laurel, knocking down the hammer on the cultivators and pulling down the cultivators. Peasants opposed the servitude - the right to grazing. The tsar's army and the peasants were punished.
