= Saldutiškis Eldership =

Eldership of Lithuania

The Saldutiškis Eldership (Lithuanian: Saldutiškio seniūnija) is an eldership of Lithuania, located in the Utena District Municipality. In 2021 its population was 703.
