= Kuktiškiai Eldership =

Eldership of Lithuania

The Kuktiškiai Eldership (Lithuanian: Kuktiškių seniūnija) is an eldership of Lithuania, located in the Utena District Municipality. In 2021 its population was 681.
