= Vytautas Augustinas =

Vytautas Augustinas (25 July 1912 – 22 October 1999) was a prominent Lithuanian interwar photographer. He is considered the pioneer of color montage panoramic photos in the country. Augustinas extensively photographed the Lithuanian countryside as well as the cityscapes he lived in.

== Biography ==
=== Early life ===
Vytautas Augustinas was born on 25 July 1912 in Leliūnai (then the Kovno Governorate of the Russian Empire) to Petras Augustinas and Marijona Augustinienė née Zarankaitė. Augustinas was fond of drawing in his childhood, and his drawings were once put up in an agricultural exhibition in Utena. After acquiring a camera from his older brother, Augustinas began taking passport photos for people under the mentorship of a local policeman. In 1929 Augustinas traveled to Kaunas, then the capital of Lithuania, to work in a photography company entitled Viskas fotografijai, which needed an assistant. Augustinas is credited as being the co-founder of the Lithuanian Amateur Photography Society in 1933, although he mentioned as its member only in 1937.

=== Interwar career ===
Augustinas's first photograph was published in the journal Jaunoji karta in 1935. Later, he was invited to work as a correspondent for the newspaper Policija. Augustinas cooperated with various periodicals such as Skautų aidas, Židinys, Kardas, Savaitė, Naujoji sodyba, Trimitas, Karys, Geležinkelininkas, and Mūsų Vilnius. Augustinas also had a partnership with the Ministry of Foreign Affairs Information Department. Augustinas's photographs would be given to foreign journalists, who would credit the photos to themselves. In 1936 Augustinas was awarded a prize for a photograph entitled Symphony of Smoke; (Lithuanian: Rūko simfonija) he presented in the Vytautas the Great War Museum. In 1937 he was awarded another monetary prize for forty-five photographs he exhibited at the Kaunas Agriculture Chamber. At the Exposition Internationale des Arts et Techniques dans la Vie Moderne in Paris, Augustinas and other Lithuanian photographer colleagues were awarded a golden medal for their exhibitions. That same year Augustinas was elected as vice-chairman of the Lithuanian Amateur Photograph Society. In 1938 Augustinas was elected to the Society's council and began working at the Spaudos fondas photolaboratory. In 27–29 October 1939 he visited Vilnius, where he pictured the city extensively. In 1940, Augustinas participated in an exhibition in Vilnius, where he was awarded by the city's mayor.

=== Later years ===
In 1941, during the German invasion of the Soviet Union, Augustinas hid around his home village of Leliūnai. During German occupation of Lithuania, Augustinas worked at periodicals such as Policija (1943–1944), Naujoji sodyba (1942–1944), and Savaitė (1942–1944). Because Augustinas had photographed people in his home village burning Soviet portraits and flags in 1941, he fled to the West at the end of the war. He later came to Vienna by train. From 1945 to 1949 Augustinas lived in displaced persons camps in Hamburg, Neugraben-Fischbek, and Spackenberg. In 1949 Augustinas emigrated to New York City, where he worked in a color photography laboratory. In 1996 Augustinas returned to Lithuania, and the following year was awarded the Order of the Lithuanian Grand Duke Gediminas, 1st degree. He died on 22 October 1999 in Vilnius.

== Bibliography ==
- Žvirgždas, Stanislovas (2017). Vytautas Augustinas: fotografavau Lietuvą (in Lithuanian). National Museum of Lithuania. ISBN 978-609-478-008-0.
