= Leliūnai Eldership =

Eldership of Lithuania

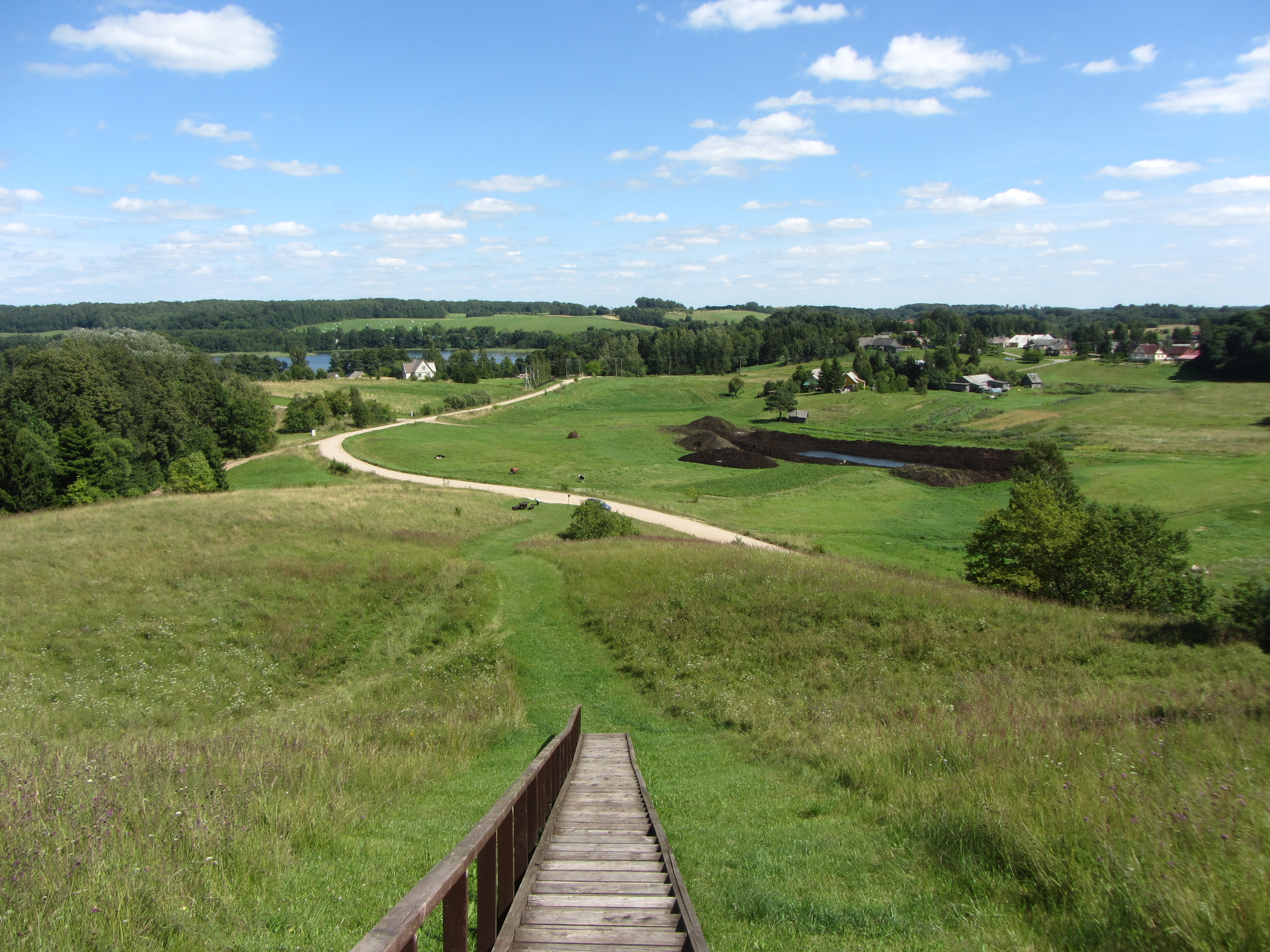

The Leliūnai Eldership (Lithuanian: Leliūnų seniūnija) is an eldership of Lithuania, located in the Utena District Municipality. In 2021 its population was 2695.
