= Užpaliai Eldership =

Eldership of Lithuania

Coordinates: 55°38′20″N 25°34′59″E

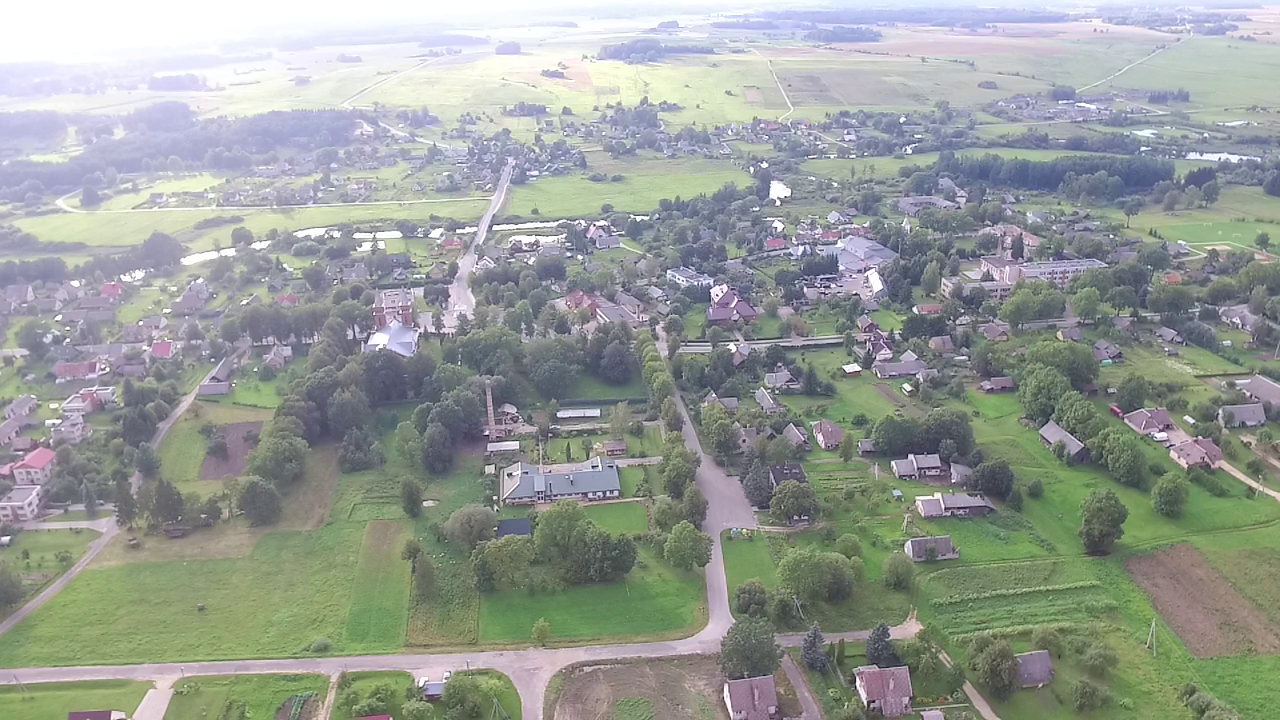
Surroundings of the town of Užpaliai

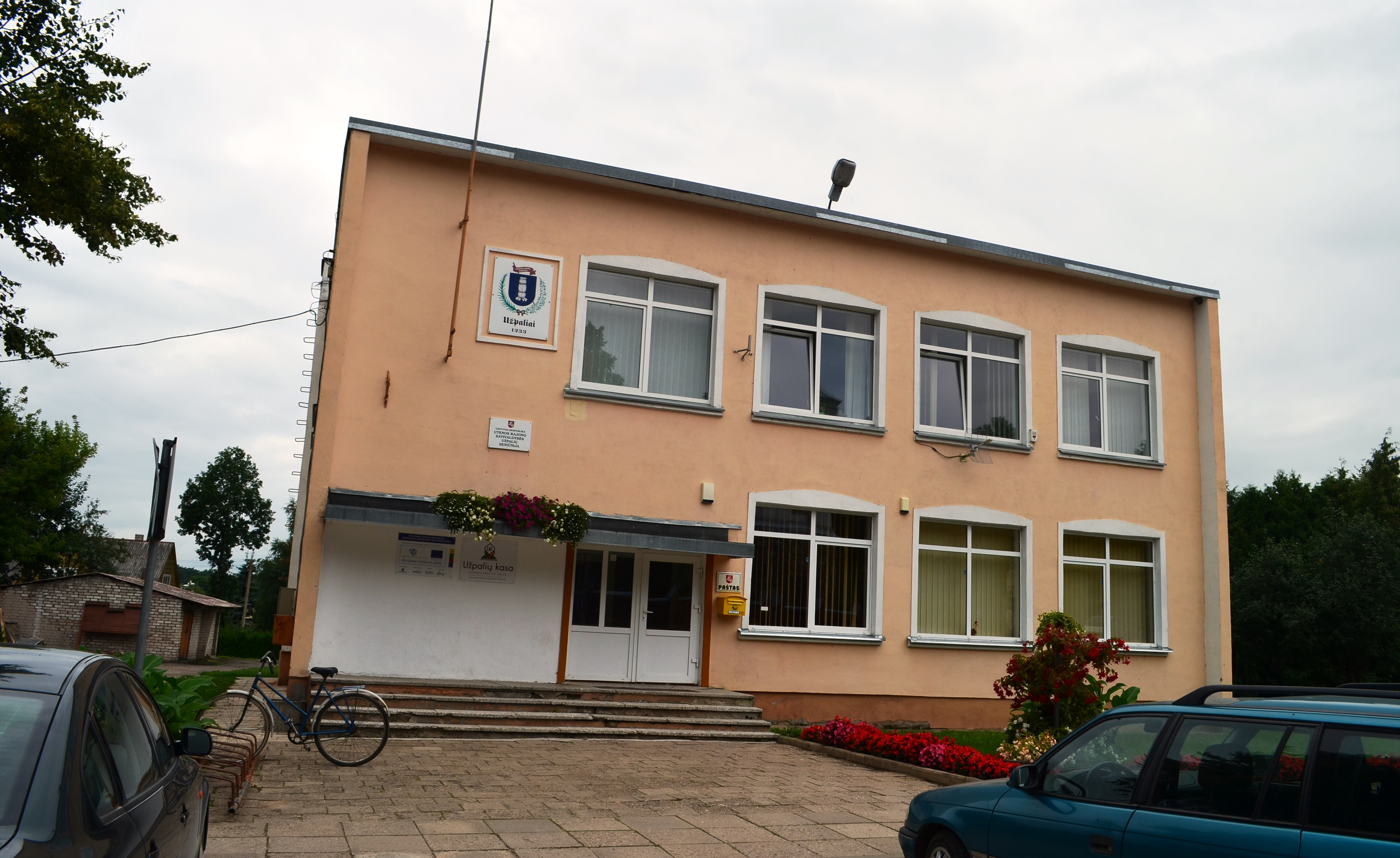
The eldership's administration

The Užpaliai Eldership (Lithuanian: Užpalių seniūnija) is an eldership of Lithuania, located in the Utena District Municipality. Its administrative center is Užpaliai. In 2021 its population was 1439.

Archaeological data indicat that the Užpaliai region was inhabited in the 4th-6th centuries. Of particular note is the Užpaliai hillfort.
