= Provisional Revolutionary Government =

Provisional Revolutionary Government may refer to:

- Provisional Revolutionary Government of Cibao, formed on July 7, 1857
- Provisional Revolutionary Government of the Republic of South Vietnam, formed on June 8, 1969
- Interim Government of Iran (1979), also known as the Provisional Revolutionary Government
- The legislature of the Lithuanian Soviet Socialist Republic (1918–19)
- The government of Brazil headed by Getúlio Vargas, 1930–1934
- The government of Hungary led by János Kádár, 1956
- Provisional Revolutionary Government of the Workers and Peasants of Ukraine
