= Kuktiškės =

- Town
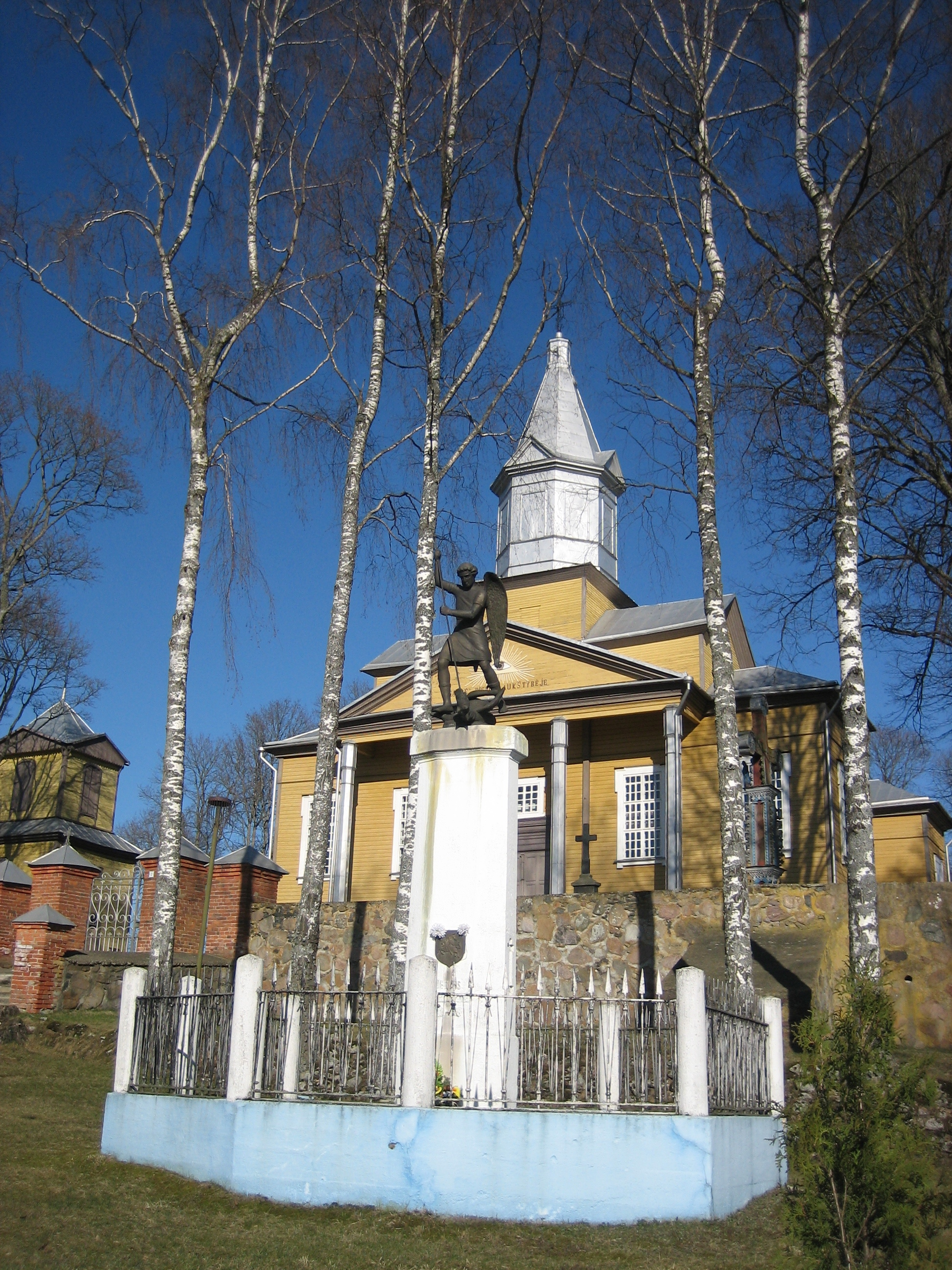

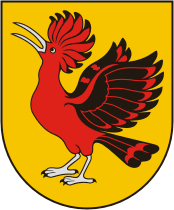
- Coat of arms

- Location within Lithuania
- Coordinates: 55°23′38″N 25°40′41″E
- Country: Lithuania
- County: Utena County
- Municipality: Utena district municipality
- Eldership: Kuktiškiai eldership

Population (2011)
  - Total: 435
- Time zone: UTC+2 (EET)
  - Summer (DST): UTC+3 (EEST)

Kuktiškės (Polish: Kukuciszki) is a town in Utena County, Lithuania. According to the 2011 census, the town has a population of 435 people.
