= Leliūnai =

- Town
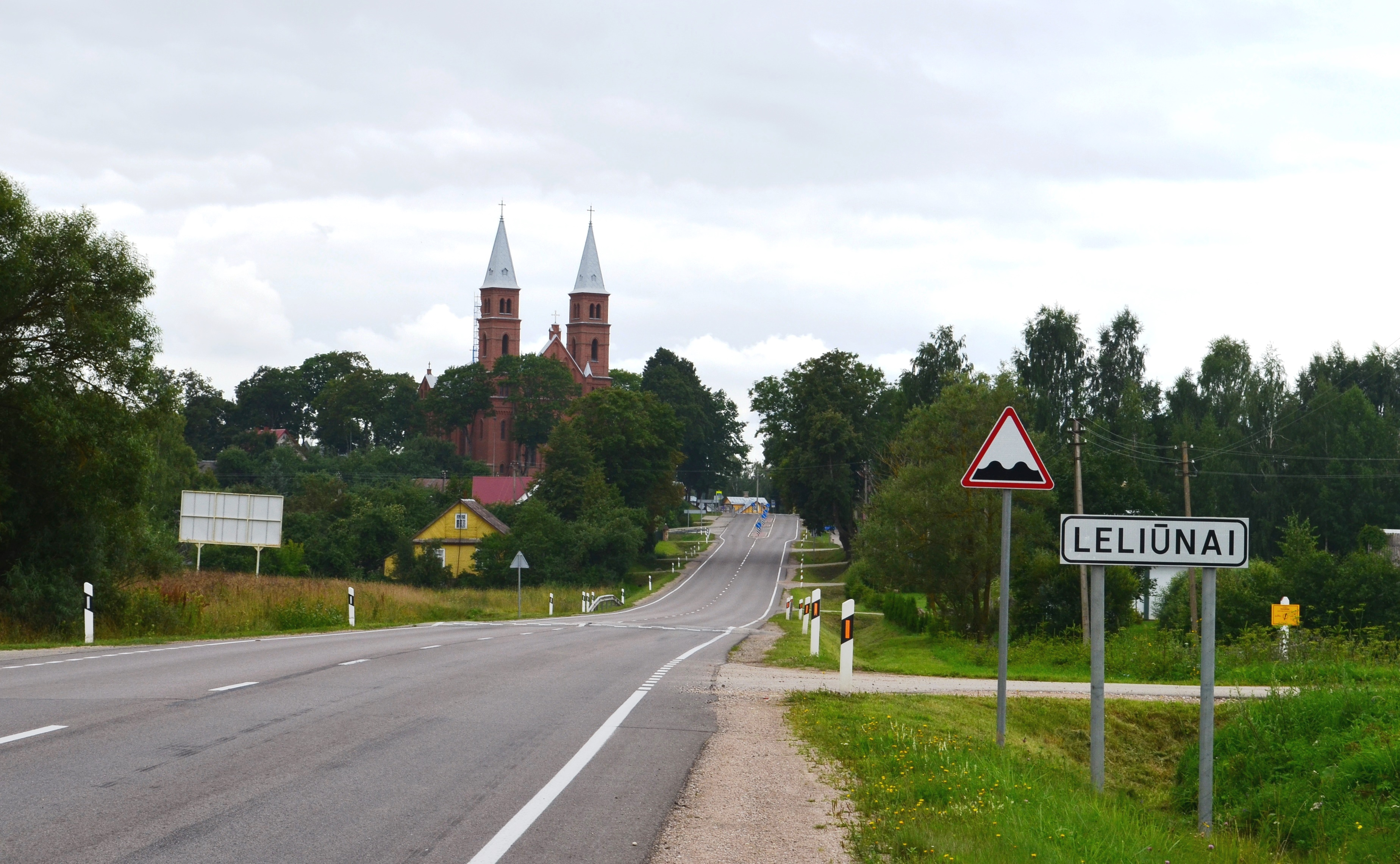

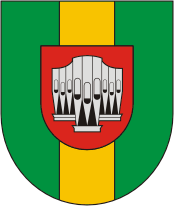
- Seal

- Location within Lithuania
- Coordinates: 55°28′30″N 25°24′0″E
- Country: Lithuania
- County: Utena County
- Municipality: Utena district municipality
- Eldership: Leliūnai eldership

Population (2011)
  - Total: 412
- Time zone: UTC+2 (EET)
  - Summer (DST): UTC+3 (EEST)

Leliūnai is a town in Utena County, Lithuania. According to the 2011 census, the town has a population of 412 people.

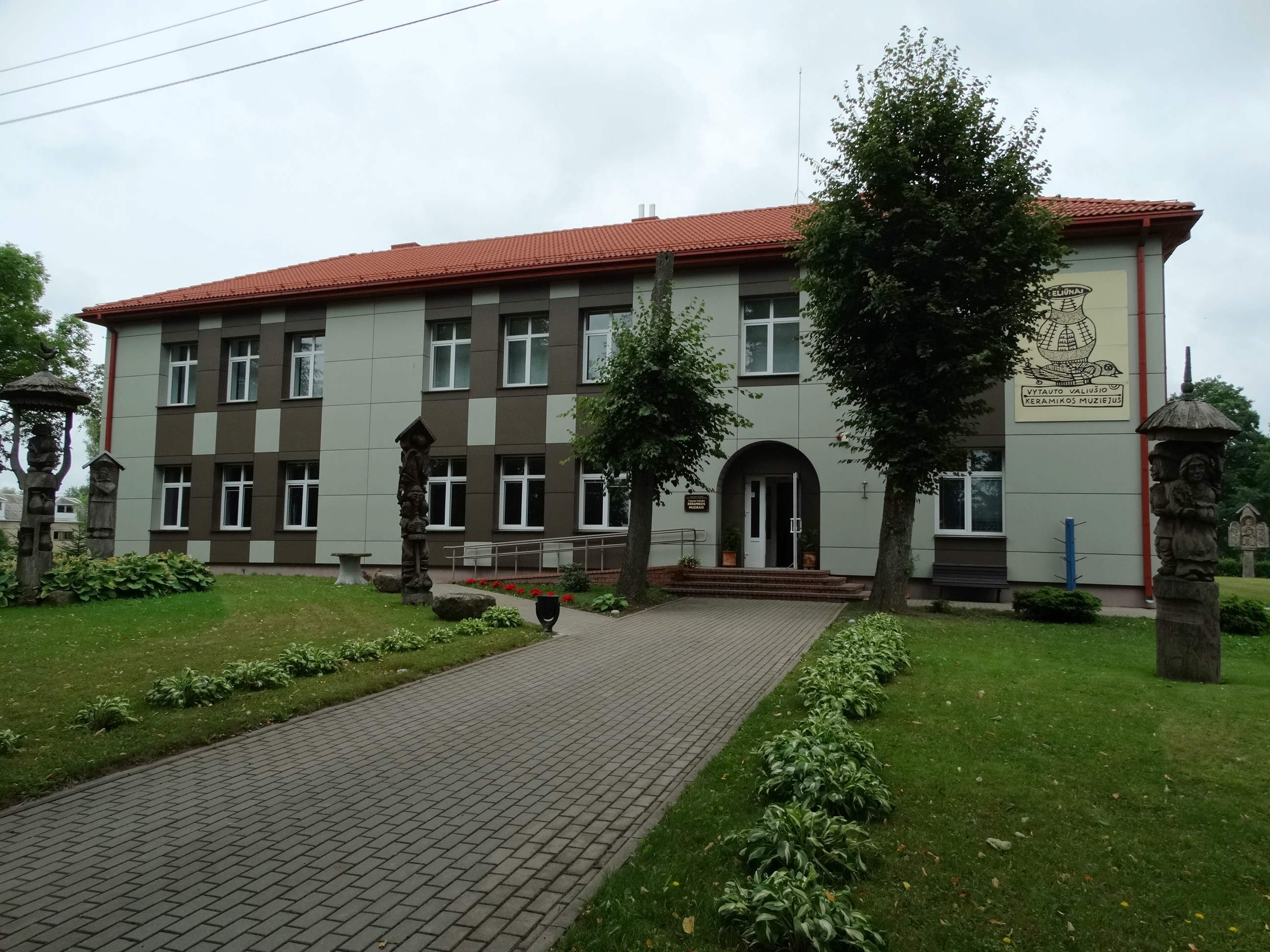
Museum of Ceramics in Leliūnai
