= Užpaliai =

- Town
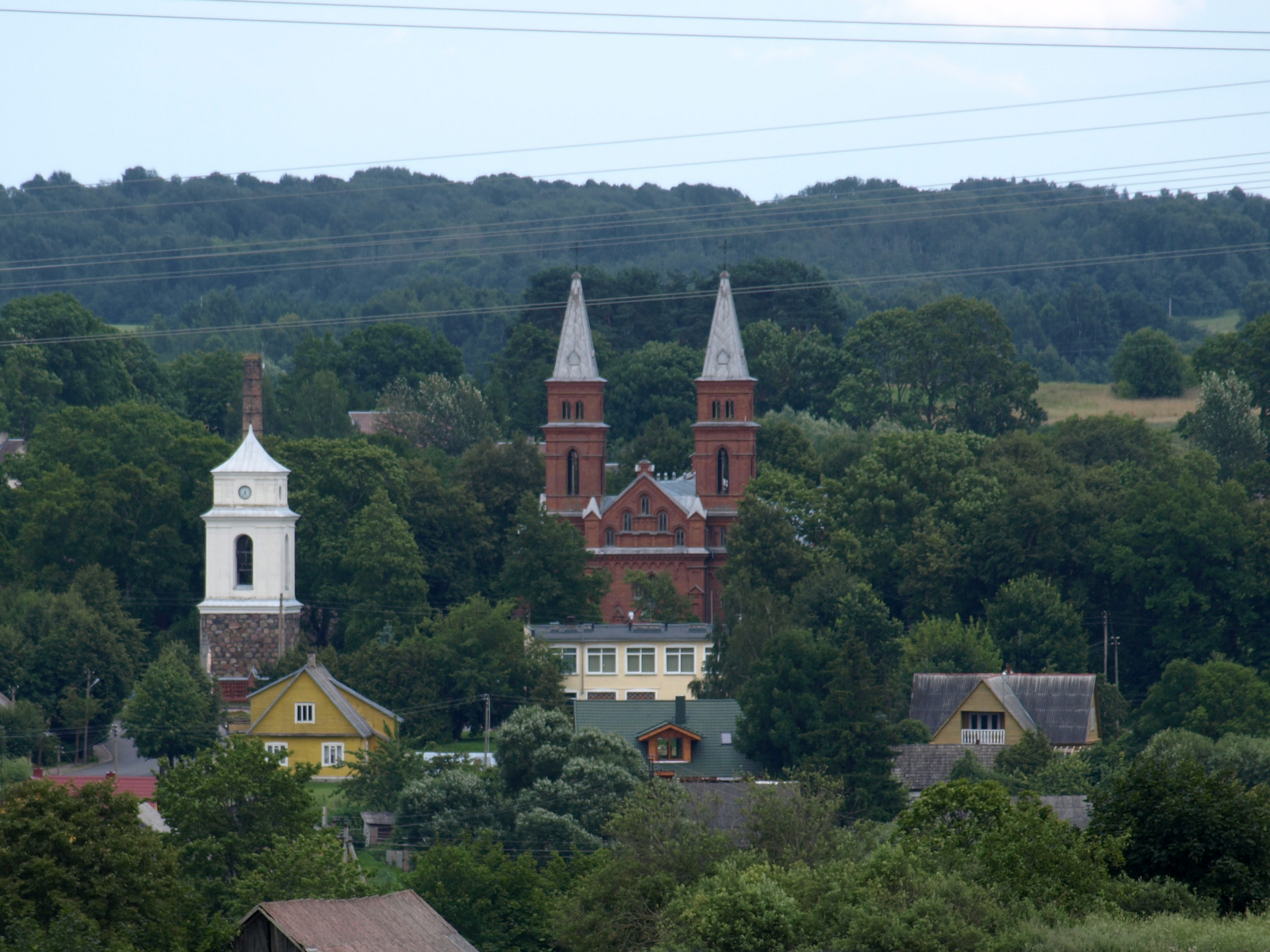

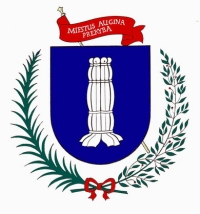
- Seal

- Location within Lithuania
- Coordinates: 55°38′20″N 25°34′59″E
- Country: Lithuania
- County: Utena County
- Municipality: Utena district municipality
- Eldership: Užpaliai eldership

Population (2021)
  - Total: 630
- Time zone: UTC+2 (EET)
  - Summer (DST): UTC+3 (EEST)

Užpaliai (traditional Russian: Ушполь, Polish: Uszpole) is a town in Utena County, Lithuania, an administrative center of the Užpaliai Eldership. According to the 2011 census, the town has a population of 758 people.

== History ==
The Jewish population was important in the town, for example, in 1897, 691 inhabitants were Jewish out of a total population of 740 people. In July 1941, the Jewish population was massacred in mass executions perpetrated by an Einsatzgruppen of Lithuanian nationalists on different sites.

== Gallery ==
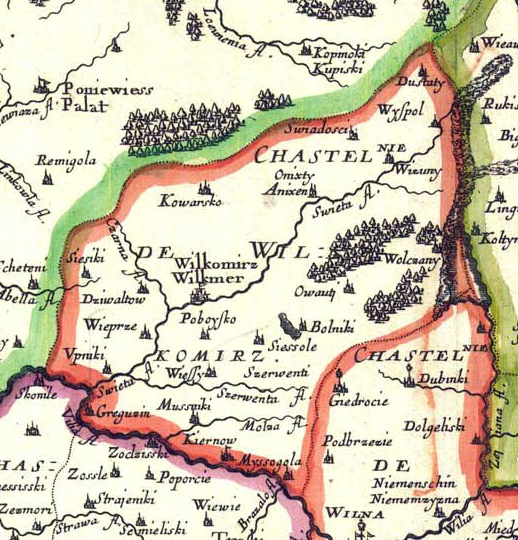
Užpaliai (Wyspol) marked in Nicolas Sanson map (1665)

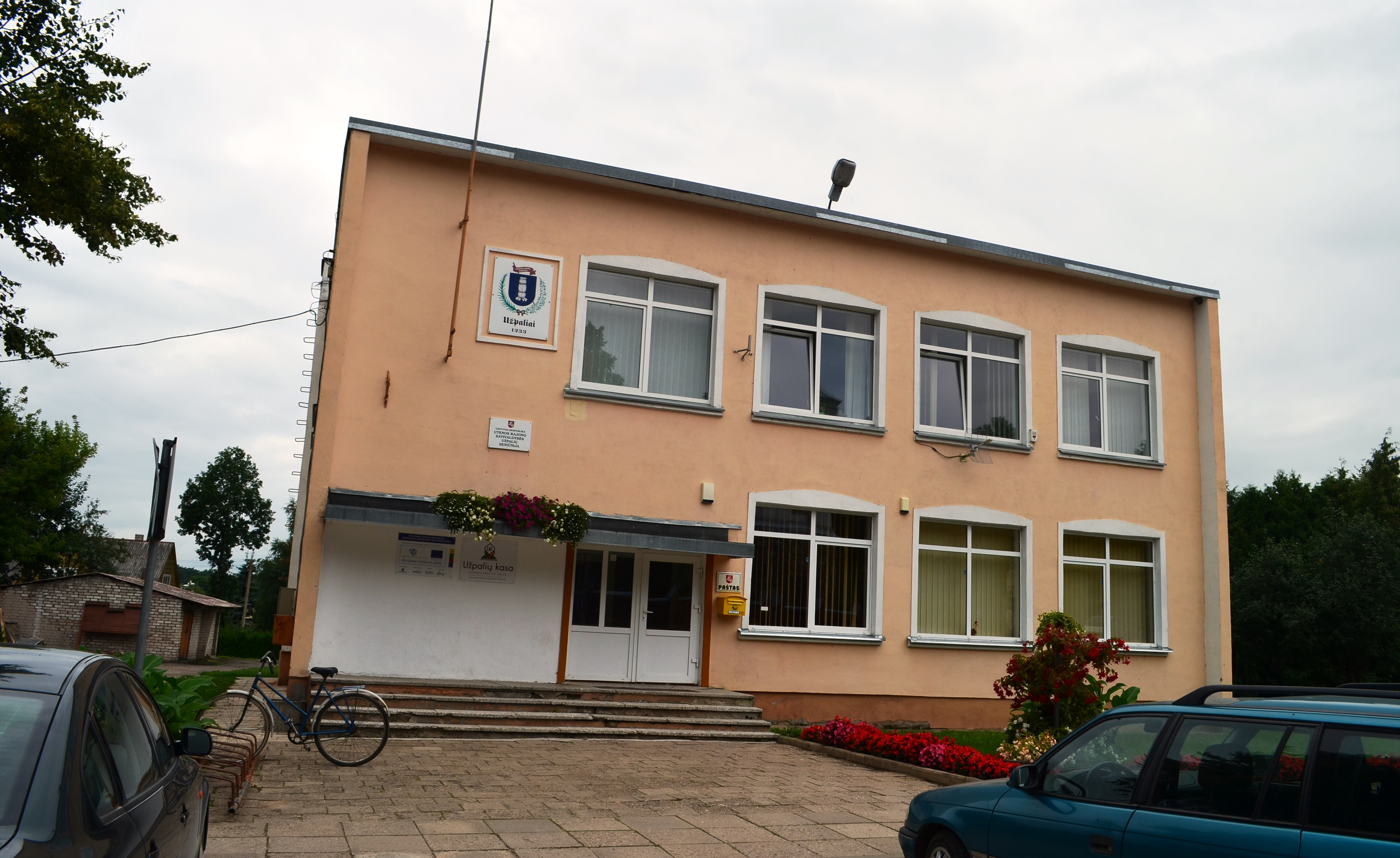
Parish

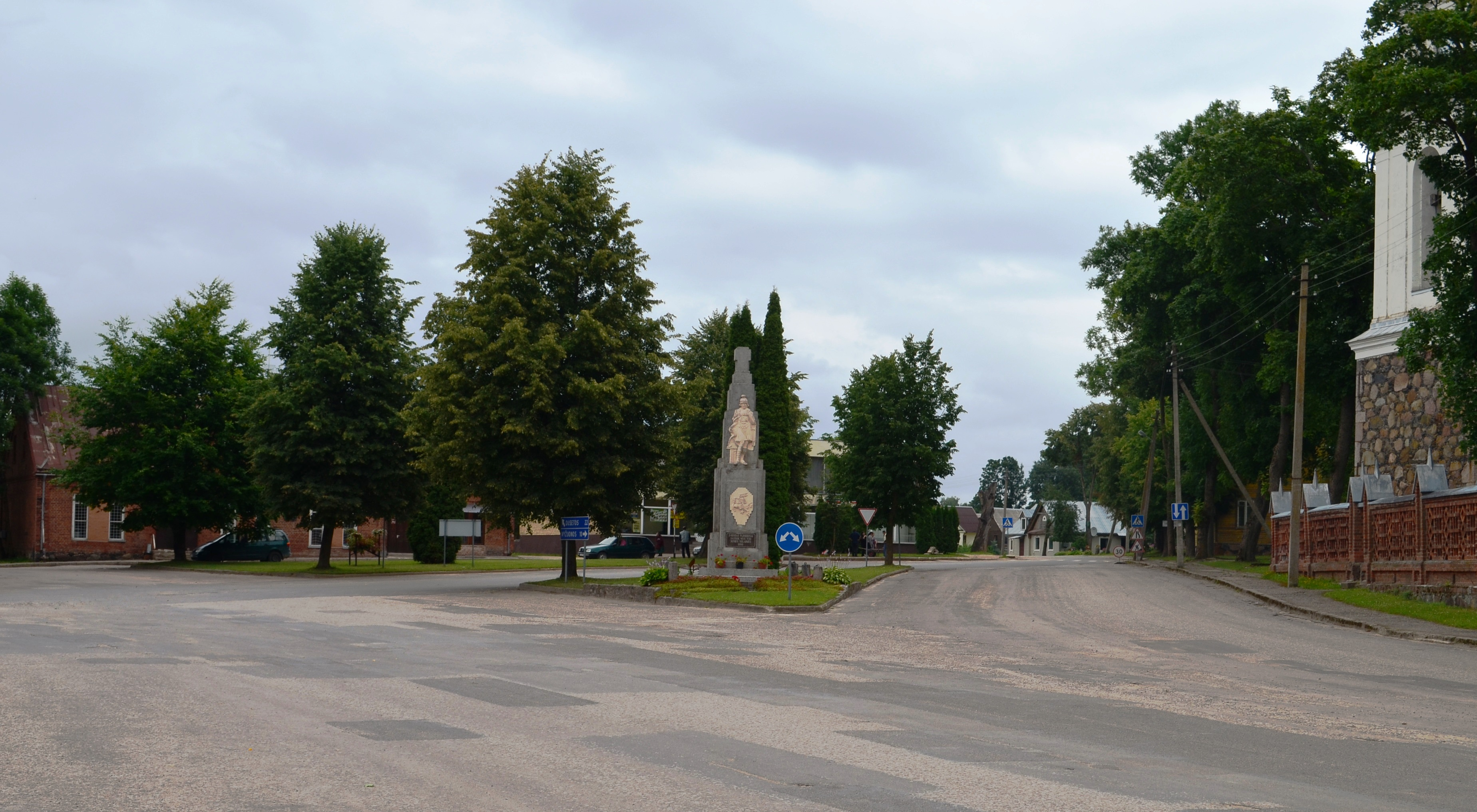
Town centre

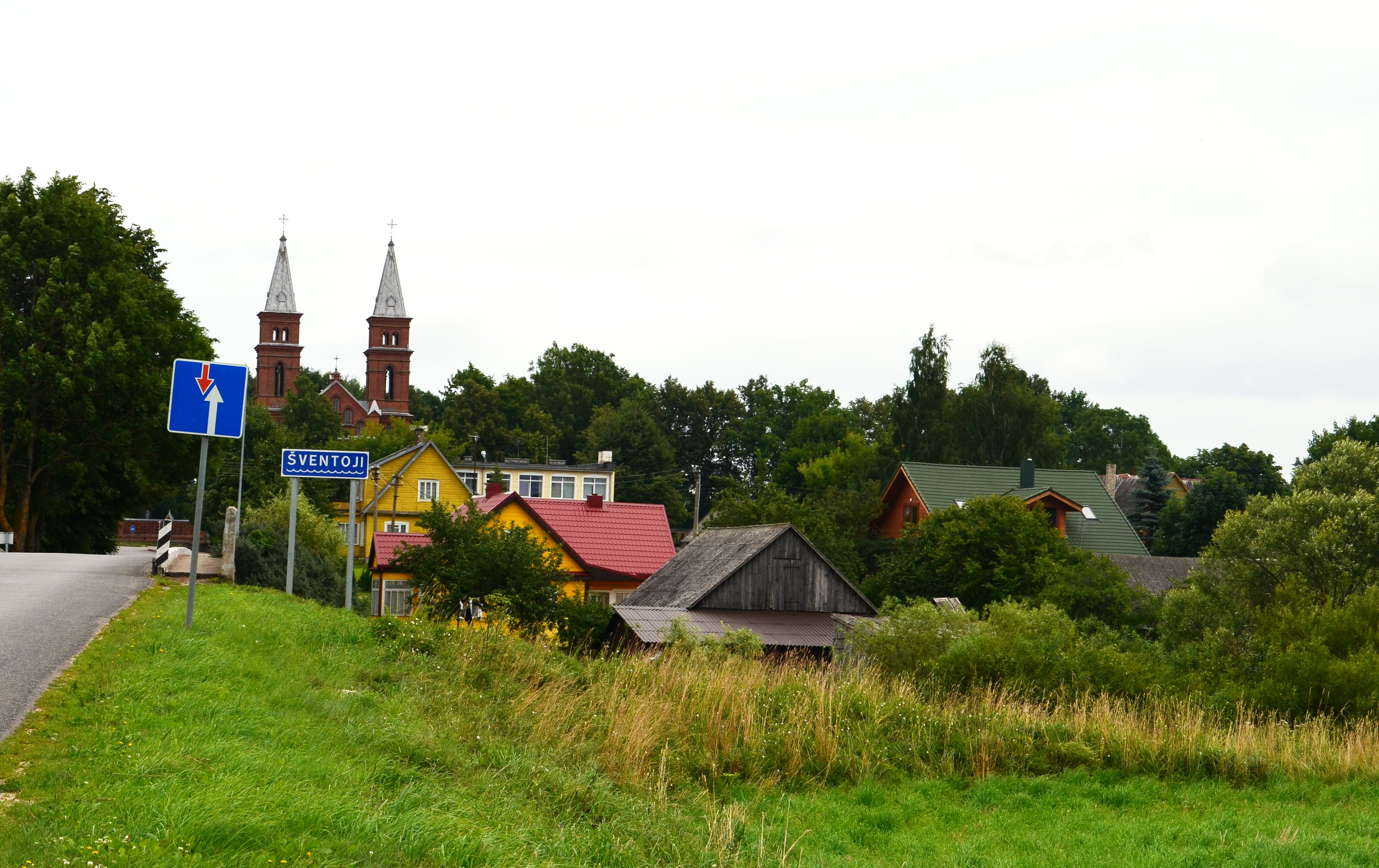

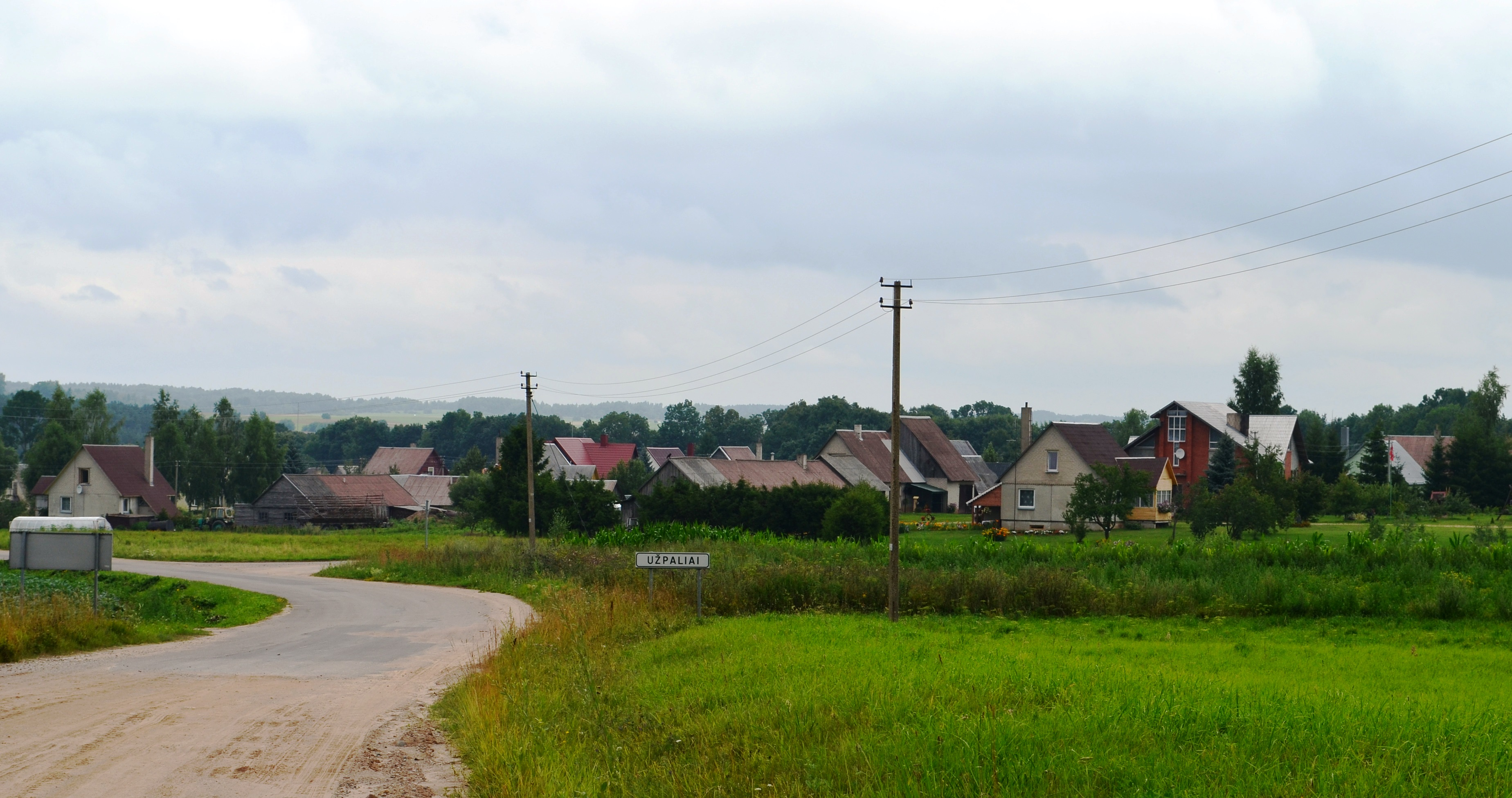
Arriving from Utena

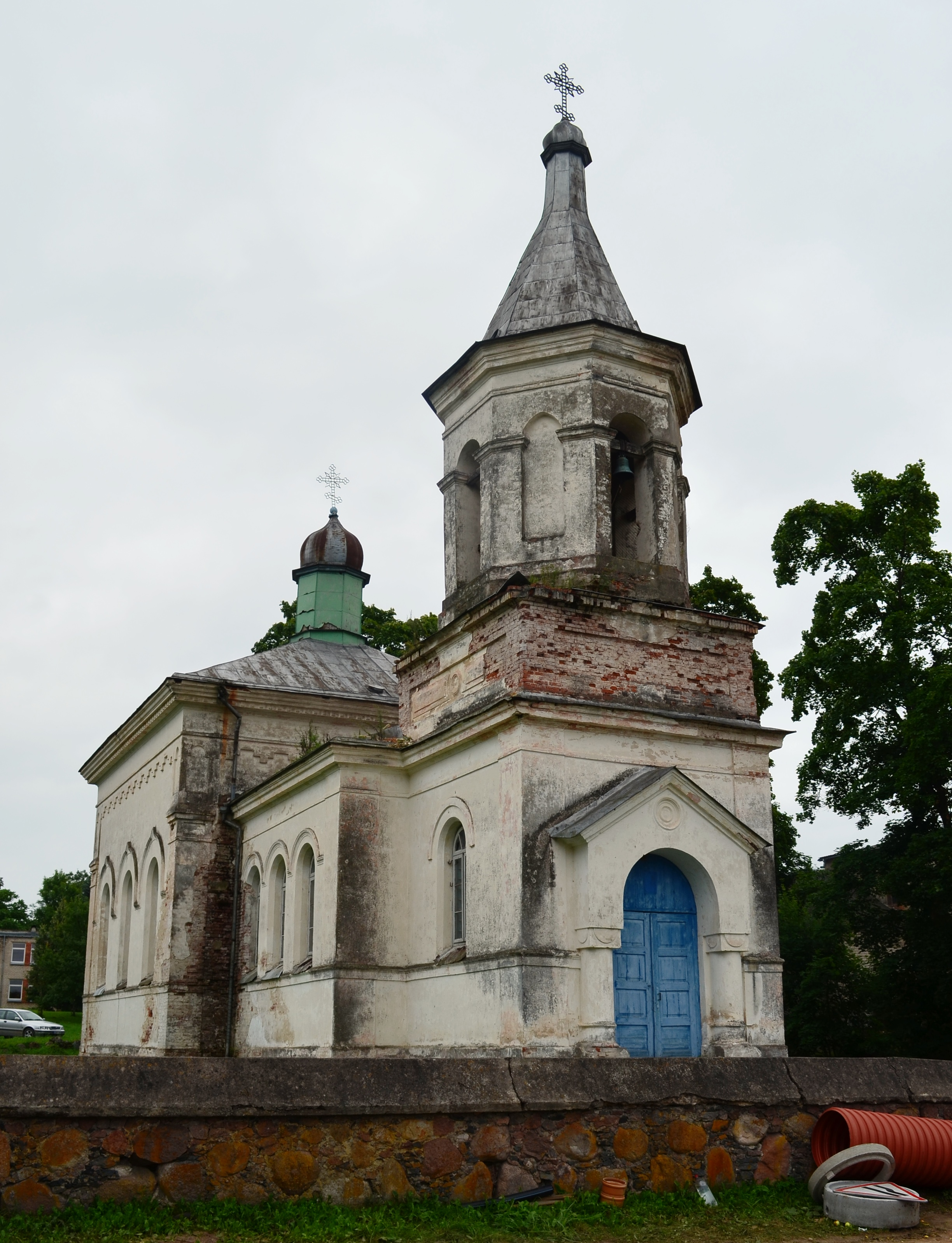
Orthodox church

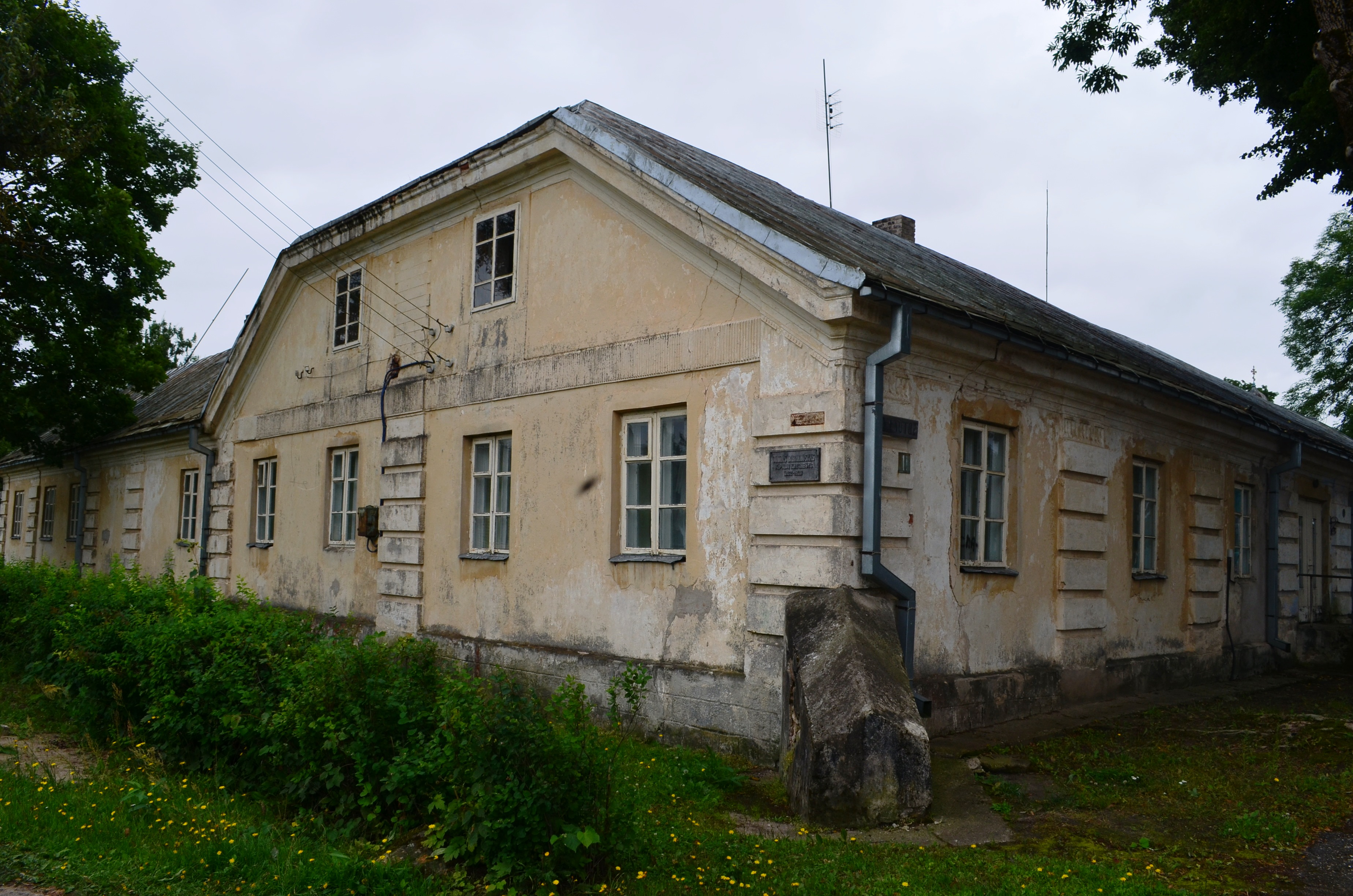
Lithuanian book smuggler Juozas Baranauskas house
