= Mateikonys =

- Village
- Location of Mateikonys
- Coordinates: 54°11′20″N 25°0′40″E
- Country: Lithuania
- Ethnographic region: Aukštaitija
- County: Vilnius County
- Municipality: Šalčininkai district municipality
- Eldership: Eišiškės eldership

Population (2011)
  - Total: 160
- Time zone: UTC+2 (EET)
  - Summer (DST): UTC+3 (EEST)

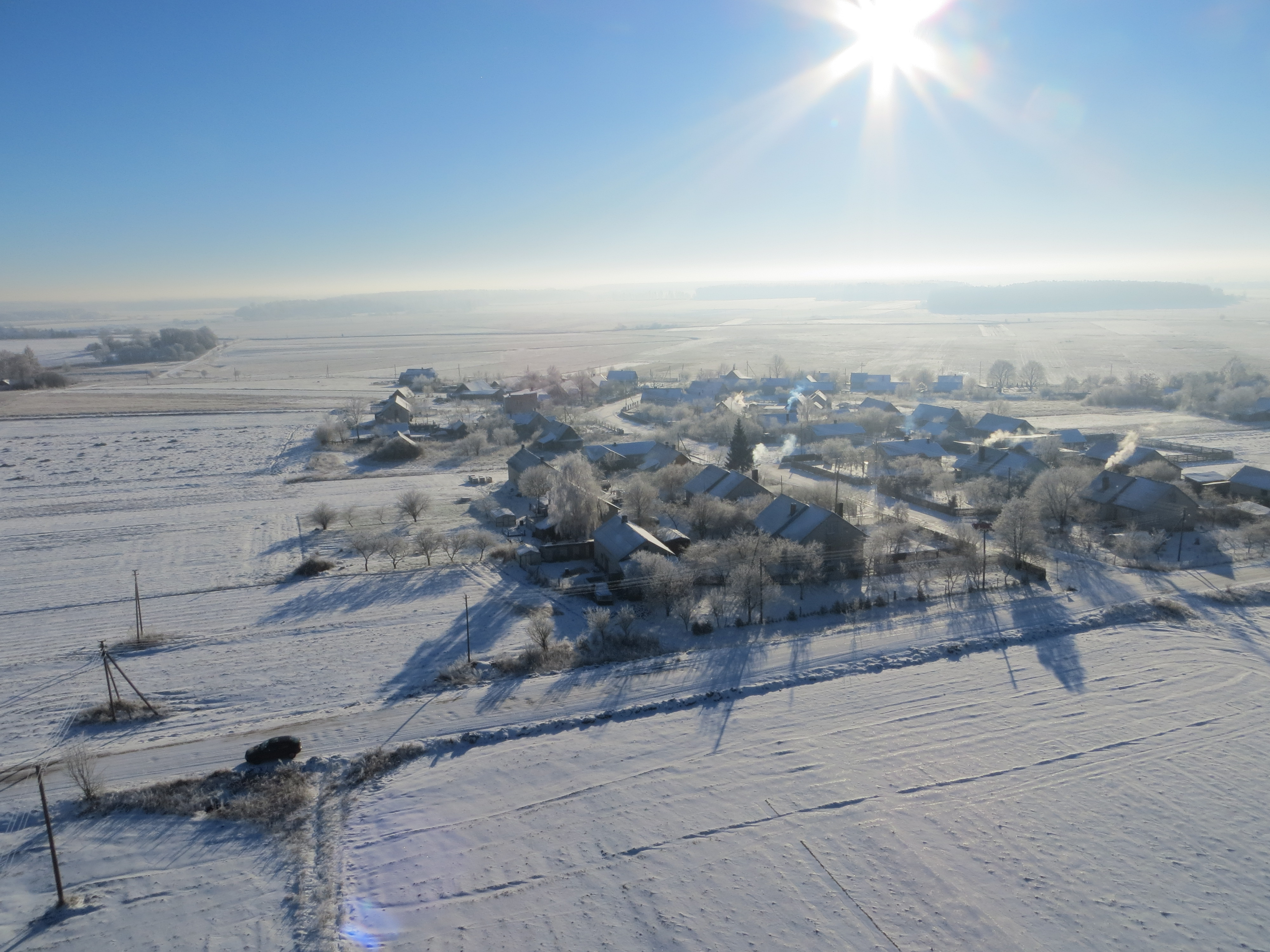
Mateikonys, Lithuania

Mateikonys is a village in the Šalčininkai district municipality, Lithuania near the border with Belarus. According to the 2011 census it had population of 160.

From 1923 to 1939 the village was located in Wilno Voivodeship, north-east Second Polish Republic. After the Nazi German and Soviet invasions of Poland in September 1939 the village was transferred to Lithuania according to the Soviet–Lithuanian Mutual Assistance Treaty.
