= Vyžuonos =

- Town
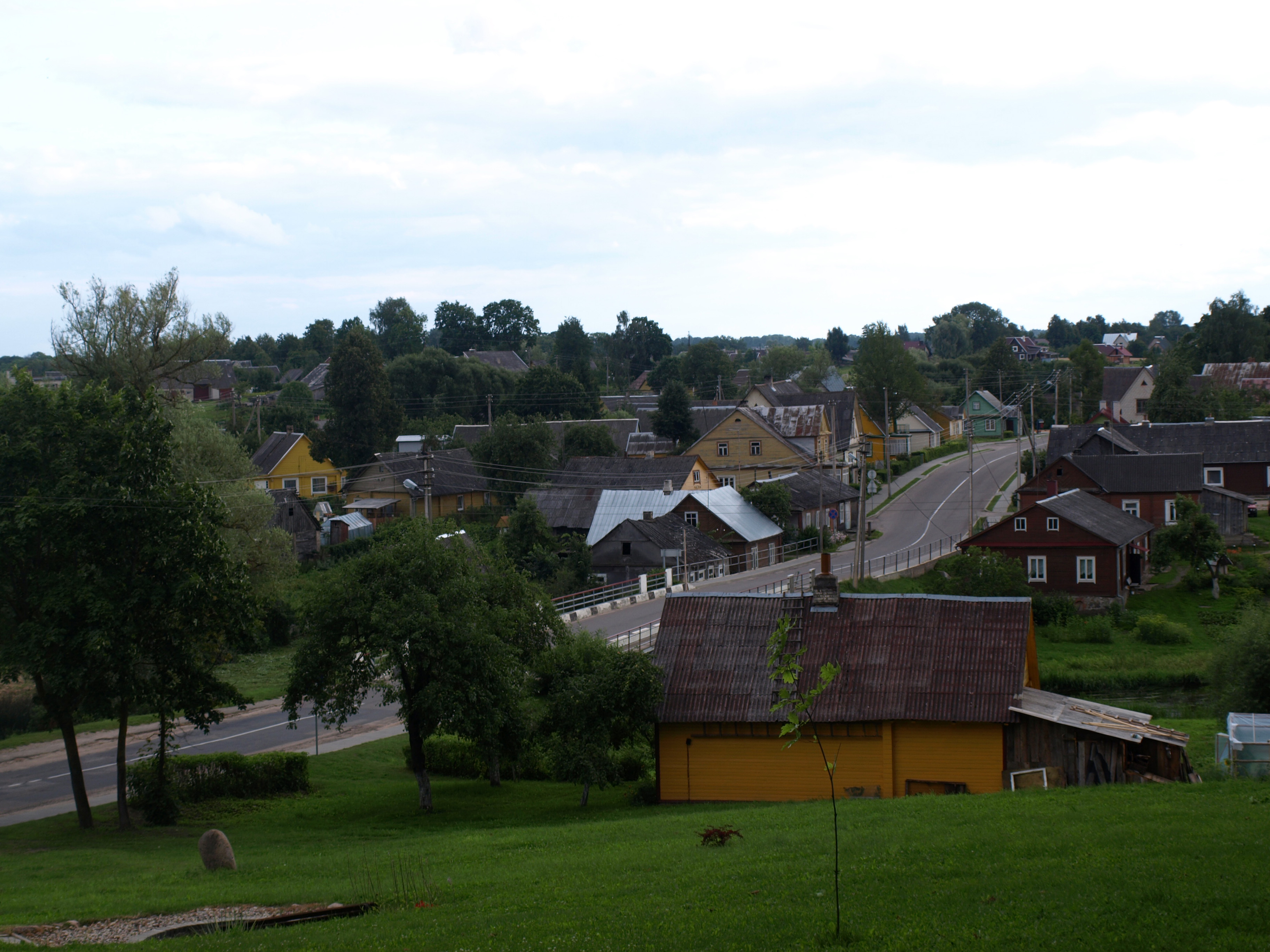

- Flag Coat of arms

- Location within Lithuania
- Coordinates: 55°35′10″N 25°29′49″E
- Country: Lithuania
- County: Utena County
- Municipality: Utena district municipality
- Eldership: Vyžuonos eldership

Population (2011)
  - Total: 512
- Time zone: UTC+2 (EET)
  - Summer (DST): UTC+3 (EEST)

Vyžuonos is a town in Utena County, Lithuania. According to the 2011 census, the town has a population of 512 people.

== History ==
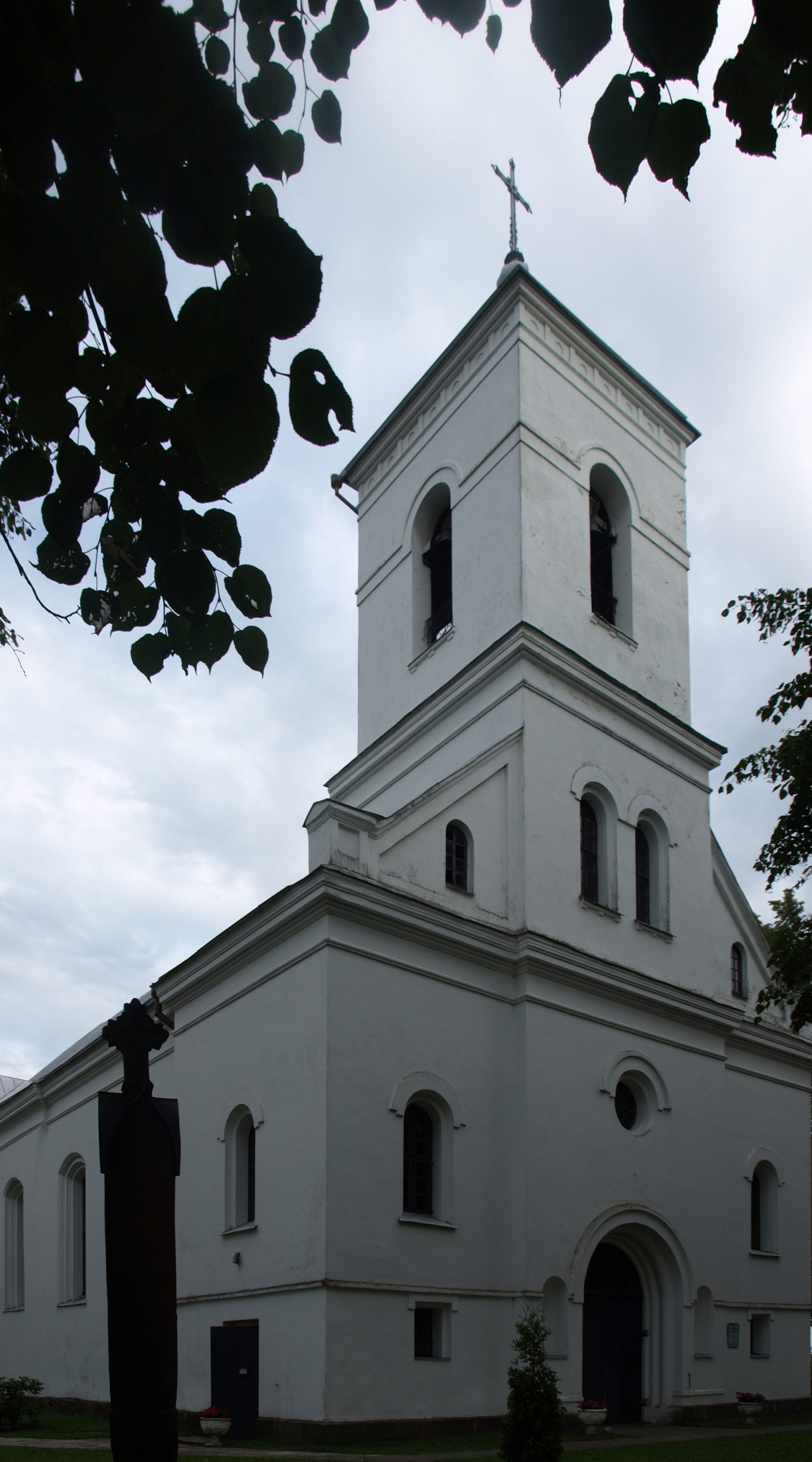
St George's Church

The first documented mention of the Vyžuonos manor, which subsequently belonged to the Radvilas of Biržai from the 16th century until the early 19th century, occurs in the 15th century. The same source also makes the first reference to the town. A Catholic church was constructed in 1406. In the latter half of the 17th century, a Lithuanian Evangelical Reformed Church was built (which subsequently collapsed at the beginning of the 18th century) and a parish school was established during the same period. In 1619, the population of the town was 34 families. During the Northern War in the early 18th century, Vyžuonos was subjected to extensive destruction, resulting in its near-total depopulation. In 1765, the Jewish population was recorded at 103 individuals.

In the latter half of the nineteenth century and the early twentieth century, Vyžuonos served as the focal point for the parish, hosting regular markets and fairs. In 1864, a Tsar's government elementary school was established, followed in 1909 by the Saulė Society School. In 1913, a secret Lithuanian school was established within the manor. Following the restoration of Lithuania in 1918, a pharmacy, a dairy, a mill, branches of the Lithuanian Riflemen's Union, Pavasarininkai and the Lithuanian Catholic Sobriety Society were established in the area.

During the Nazi German occupation of Lithuania, in July 1941, 67 Jews of the city were executed by an Einsatzgruppen in Vyžuonos forest. There is a memorial at the location of the massacre. During the Soviet occupation following the World War II, the Šarūnas and Liūtas detachments of Lithuanian partisans were active in the area. In 2005, the coat of arms of Vyžuonos was approved by the President of Lithuania.
