= Tauragnai =

- Town
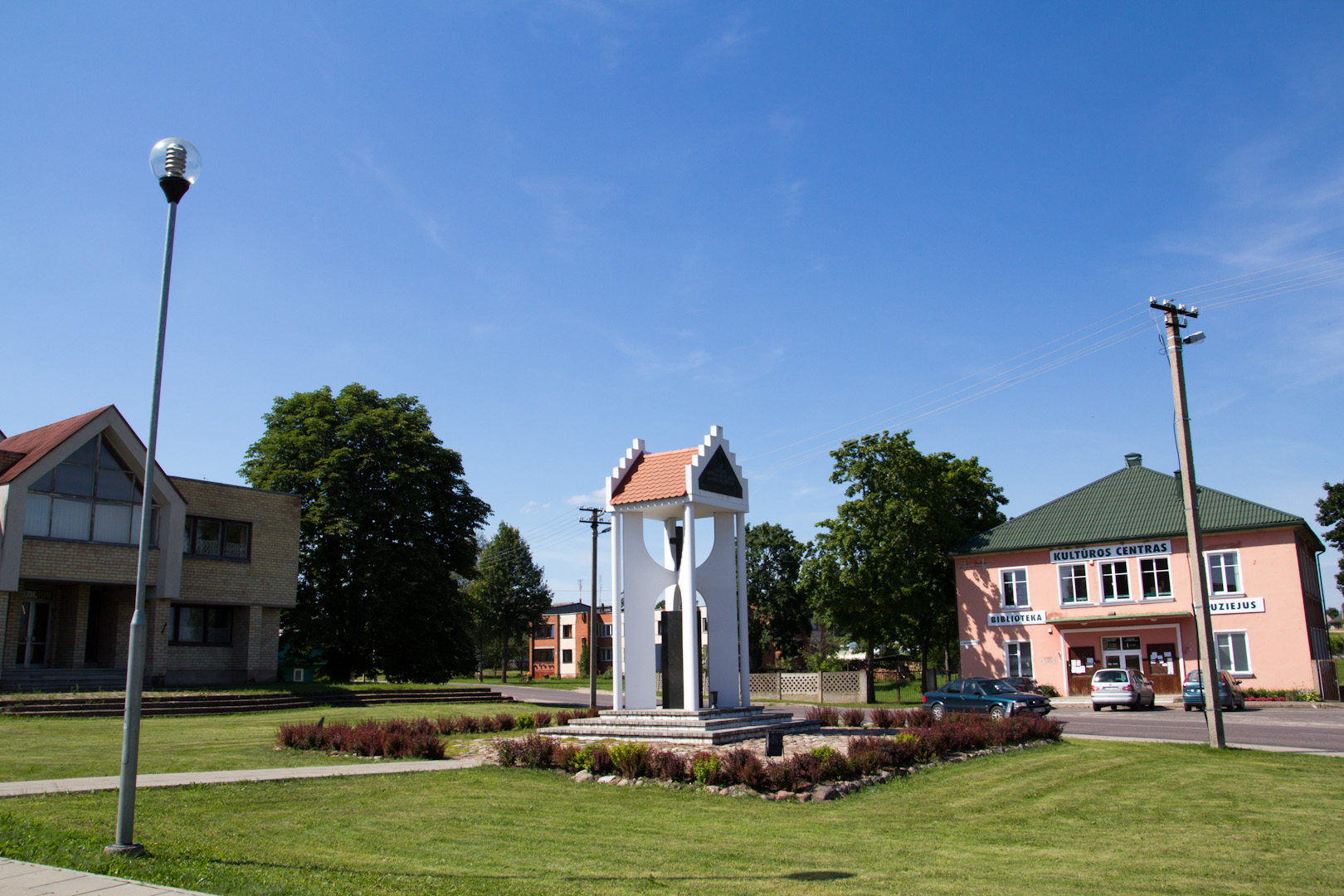
- Town centre

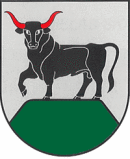
- Seal

- Location within Lithuania
- Coordinates: 55°26′38″N 25°48′50″E
- Country: Lithuania
- County: Utena County
- Municipality: Utena district municipality
- Eldership: Tauragnai eldership

Population (2021)
  - Total: 384
- Time zone: UTC+2 (EET)
  - Summer (DST): UTC+3 (EEST)

Tauragnai (Polish: Tauroginy) is a town in Utena County, Lithuania. According to the 2011 census, the town has a population of 473 people. The Tauragnai mound is located on the southern shore of lake Tauragnas. [2]

The Tauragnai castle-mound, also known as Taurapilis, is a historical hillfort located on the southern shore of Lake Tauragnas in Lithuania. The castle was burned down by the Livonian Order in 1433, according to the Utena Tourism Information Center. The Tauragnai mound was officially declared a cultural monument in 1998. The mound is unexplored, dating from the 1st millennium - the beginning of the 2nd millennium.

The arms were officially granted on May 21, 2001.

The ox is canting: the name of the town originates from "tauro ragas" ("horn of wild ox"). The base refers to the impressive Tauragnai castle-mound.

== Gallery ==
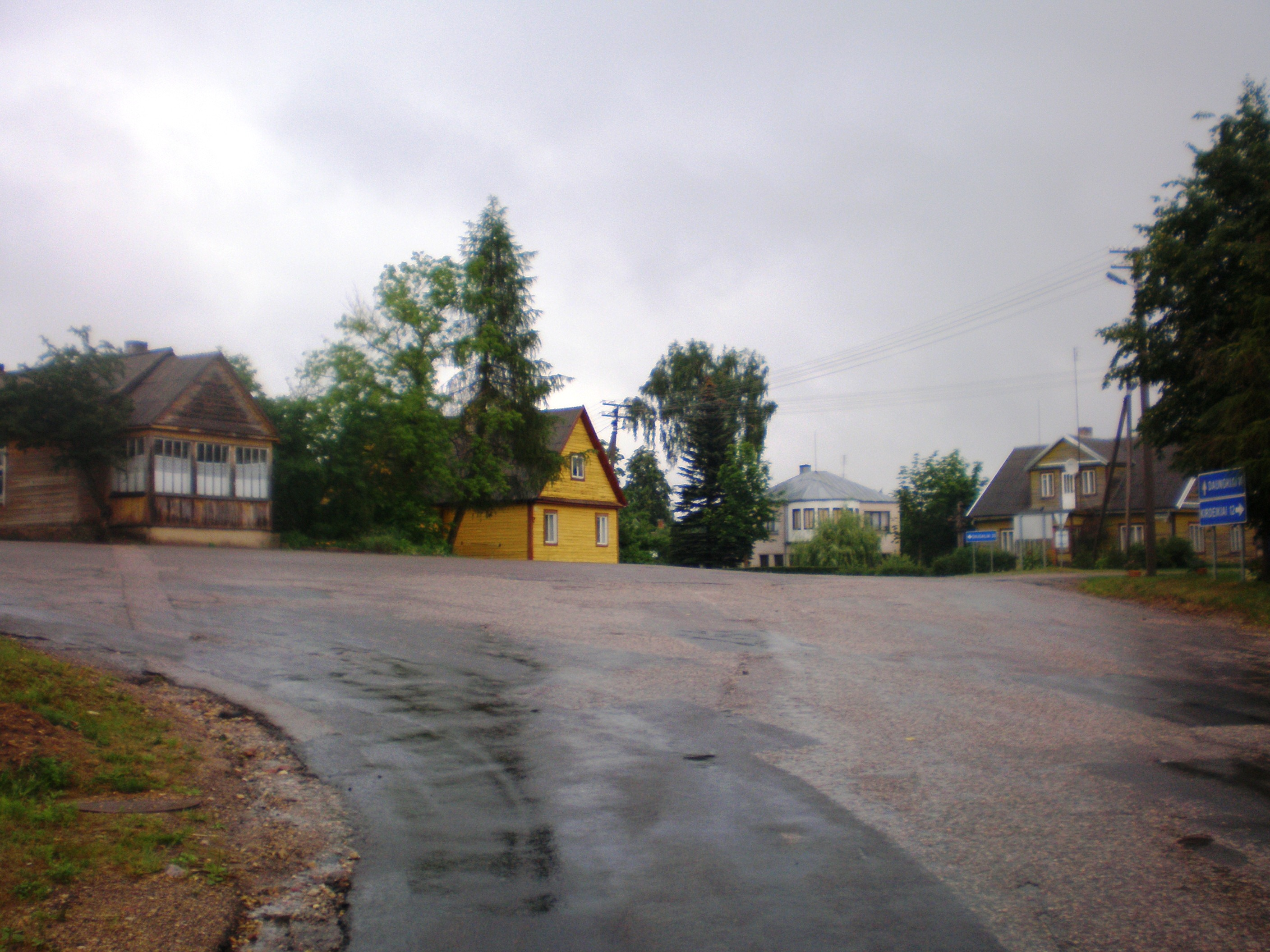

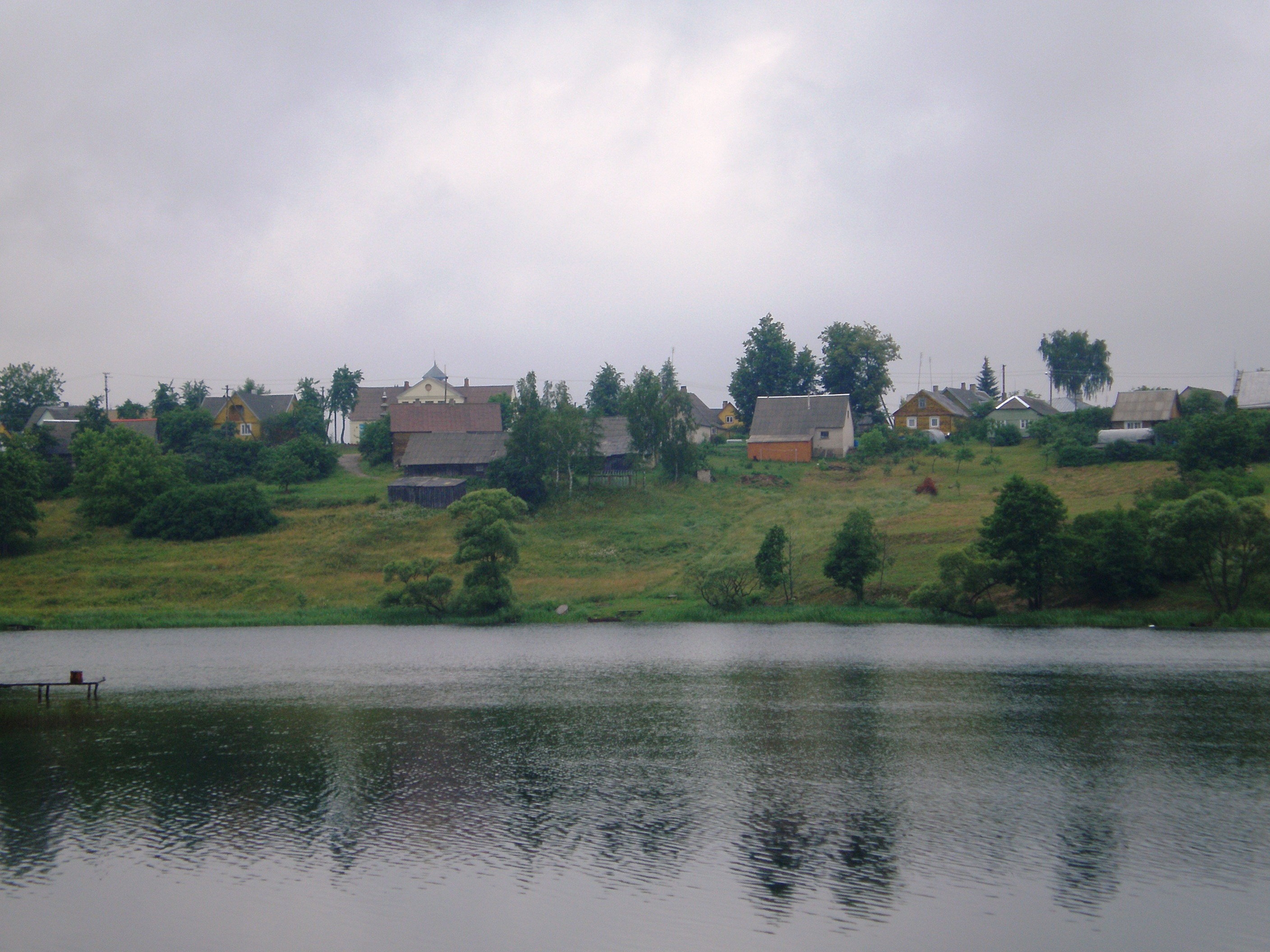
