= Utena District Municipality =

Coordinates: 55°31′12″N 25°38′49″E

Utena District Municipality Utenos rajono savivaldybė
- Municipality
- Flag Coat of arms

- Location of Utena district municipality within Lithuania

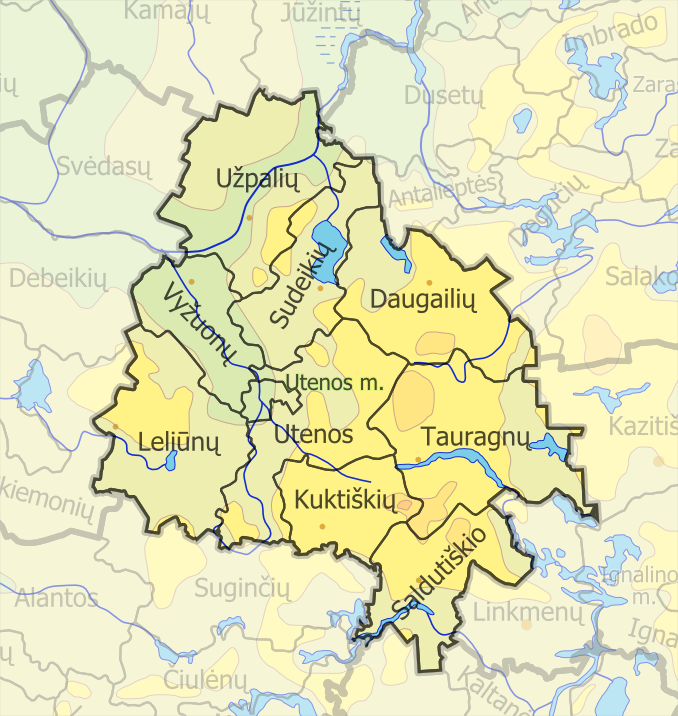
- Map of Utena district municipality
- Country: Lithuania
- Ethnographic region: Aukštaitija
- County: Utena County
- Capital: Utena (town)
- Elderships: 10

Area
  - Total: 1,229 km^{2} (475 sq mi)
  - Rank: 29th

Population (2021)
  - Total: 37,509
  - Rank: 18-19th
  - Density: 30.52/km^{2} (79.05/sq mi)
  - Rank: 19th
- Time zone: UTC+2 (EET)
  - Summer (DST): UTC+3 (EEST)
- Telephone code: 389
- Major settlements: Utena (pop. 25,397); Užpaliai (pop. 630); Tauragnai (pop. 384)
- Website: www.utena.lt

Utena District Municipality is one of 60 municipalities in Lithuania.

== Structure ==
District structure:

- 1 city – Utena;
- 8 towns – Daugailiai, Kuktiškės, Leliūnai, Saldutiškis, Sudeikiai, Tauragnai, Užpaliai and Vyžuonos;
- 592 villages.

Population of largest Utena District Municipality elderships (2001):

- Utena – 33860
- Užpaliai – 877
- Tauragnai – 602
- Vyžuonos – 581
- Antalgė – 564
- Kuktiškės – 485
- Leliūnai – 483
- Sudeikiai – 407
- Atkočiškės – 393
- Saldutiškis – 389.

== Nature and geography ==
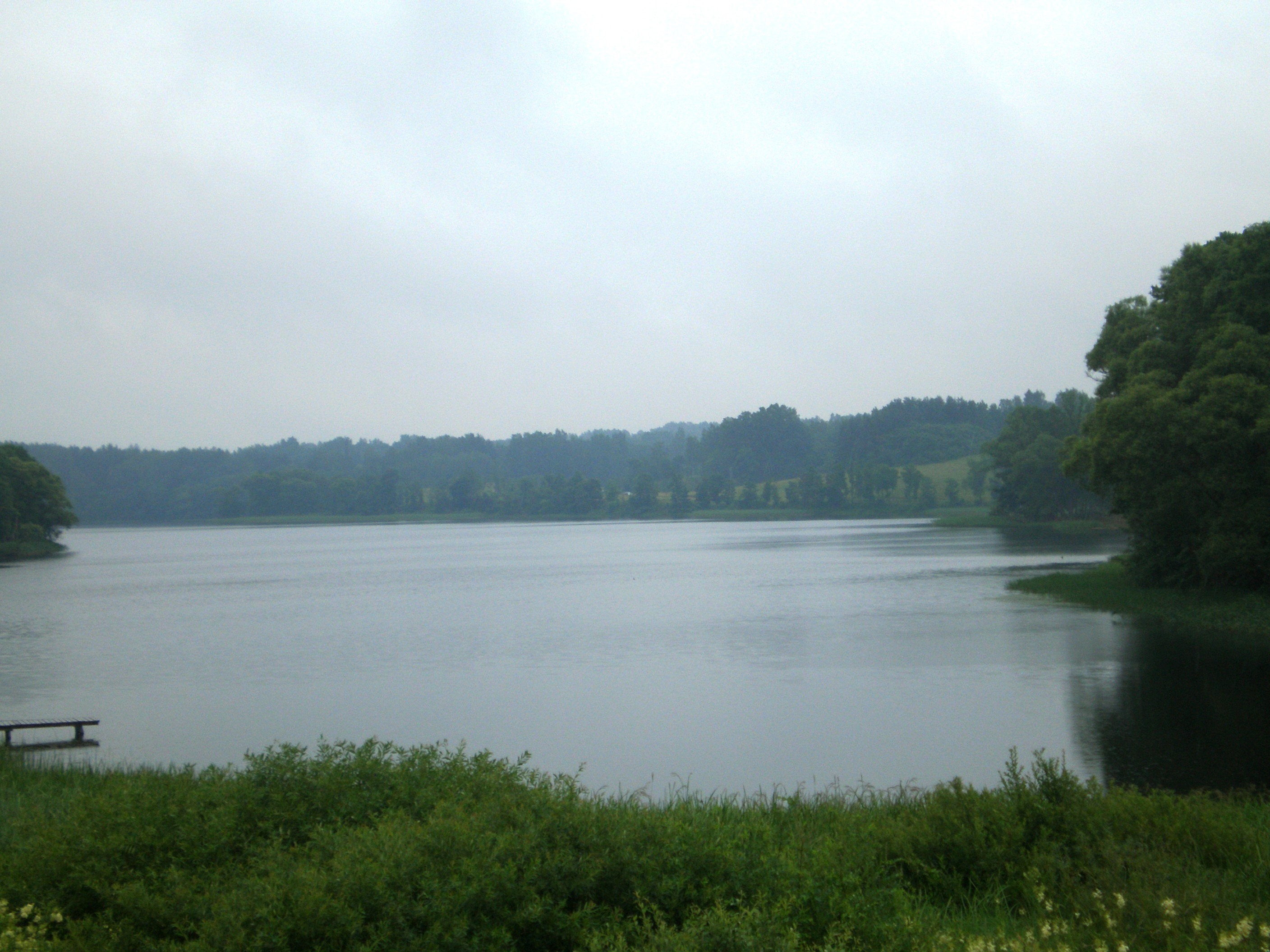
Tauragnas

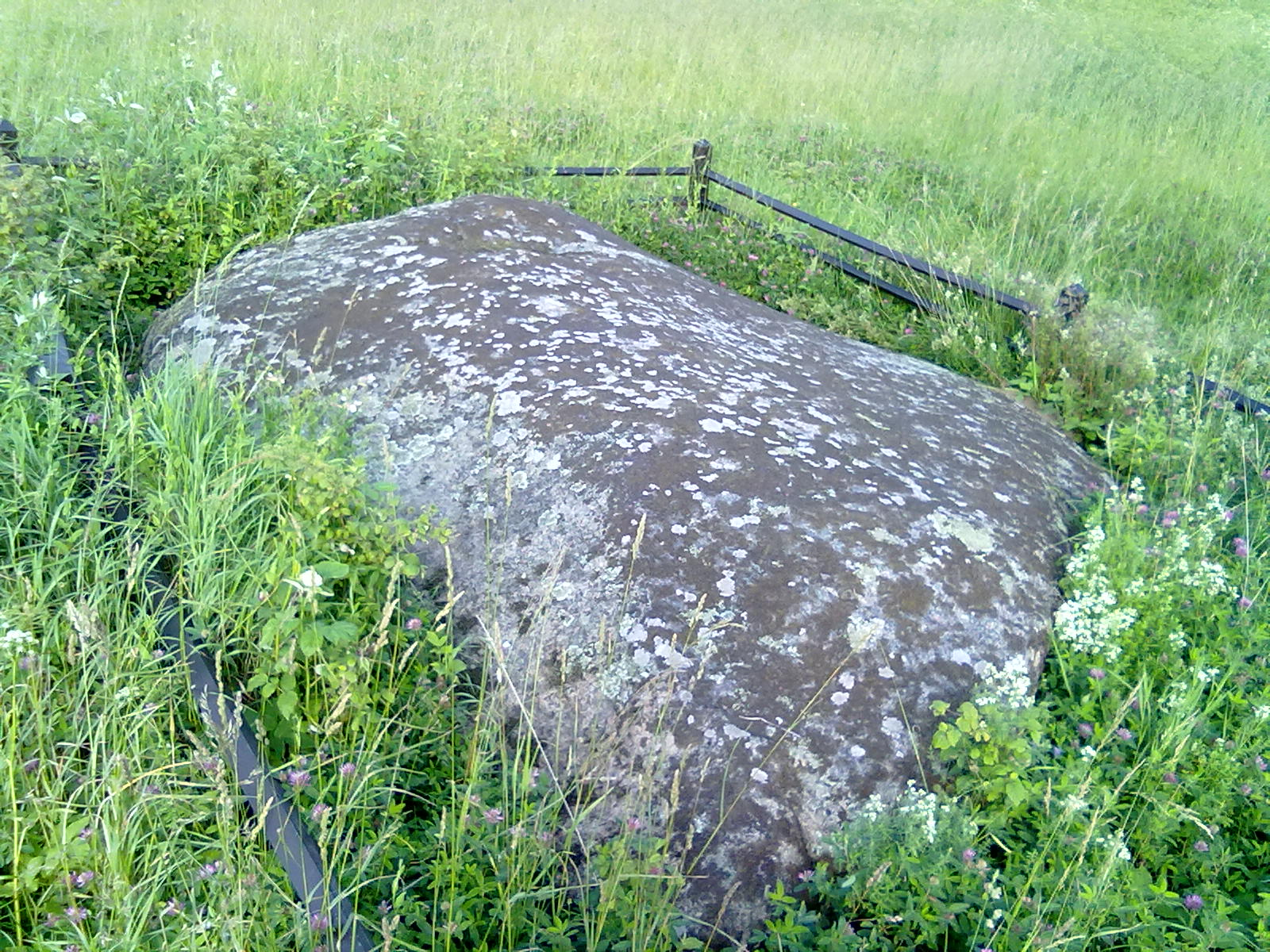
Puntukas of Biliakiemis

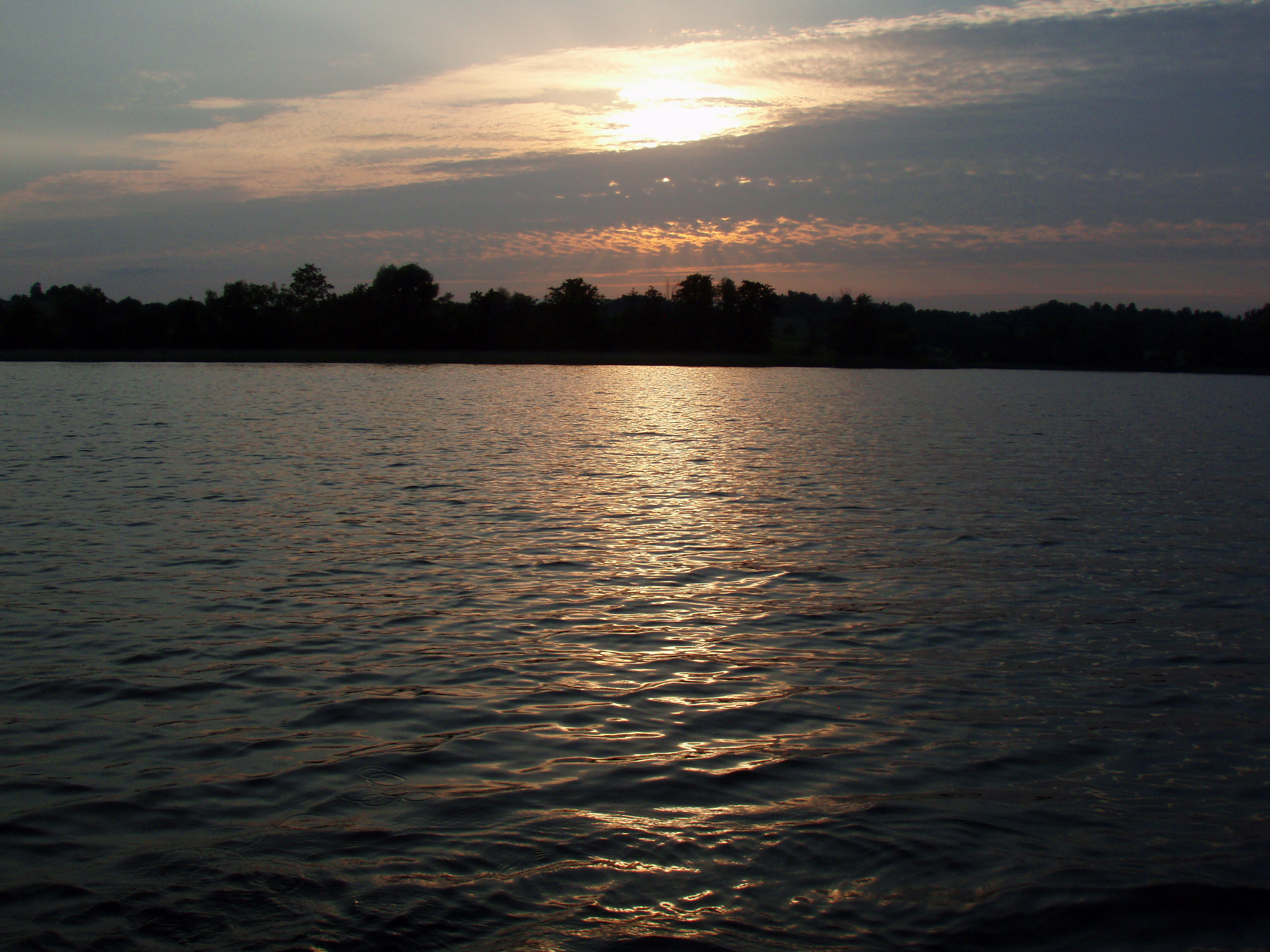
Indrajai
