= Karolis Požela =

Lithuanian communist leader

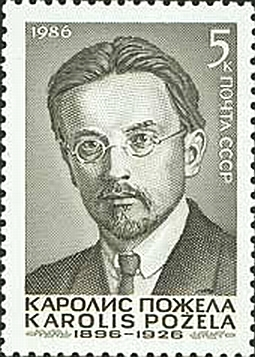
- Soviet postal stamp (1986)
- Born: 29 February 1896; Bardiškiai, Kovno Governorate, Russian Empire
- Died: 27 December 1926 (aged 30); Kaunas Fortress, Lithuania
- Cause of death: Execution by firing squad
- Education: University of Tartu
- Political party: Russian Social Democratic Labour Party (bolsheviks); Communist Party of Lithuania
- Spouse(s): Kotryna "Katrė" Matulaitytė; Eugenija Tautkaitė
- Children: Maja Poželaitė (b. 1927); Juras Požela (b. 1925)

Karolis Juozovic Požela (29 February 1896 – 27 December 1926) was one of the early Lithuanian communist leaders.

As a medical student at the University of Tartu, he joined the Russian Social Democratic Labour Party (bolsheviks) in 1916. In the short-lived Lithuanian Soviet Socialist Republic, he organized communists in Šiauliai. After the collapse of the Soviet regime, Požela joined the underground Communist Party of Lithuania (CPL), becoming a member of its Central Committee in 1921. When party leadership was arrested in Königsberg in 1921, he remained essentially the only party leader in Lithuania. He continued political work and became a member of CPL Orgburo in 1923 and Politburo in 1926. At various times, he edited and published various communist newspapers and publications, including Tiesa (Truth), Kareivių tiesa (Soldiers' Truth), and Darbininkų gyvenimas (Life of Workers). For his communist activities, he was imprisoned a total of six times. When the Lithuanian military organized the coup d'état of 17 December 1926, the official rationale was to protect Lithuania from an imminent Bolshevik revolt (historians found no credible evidence of such revolt). In the aftermath, many communists were arrested. Požela and three others, who became known as the four communards, were executed on 27 December in the Sixth Fort of the Kaunas Fortress.

== Early life and communist revolutions ==
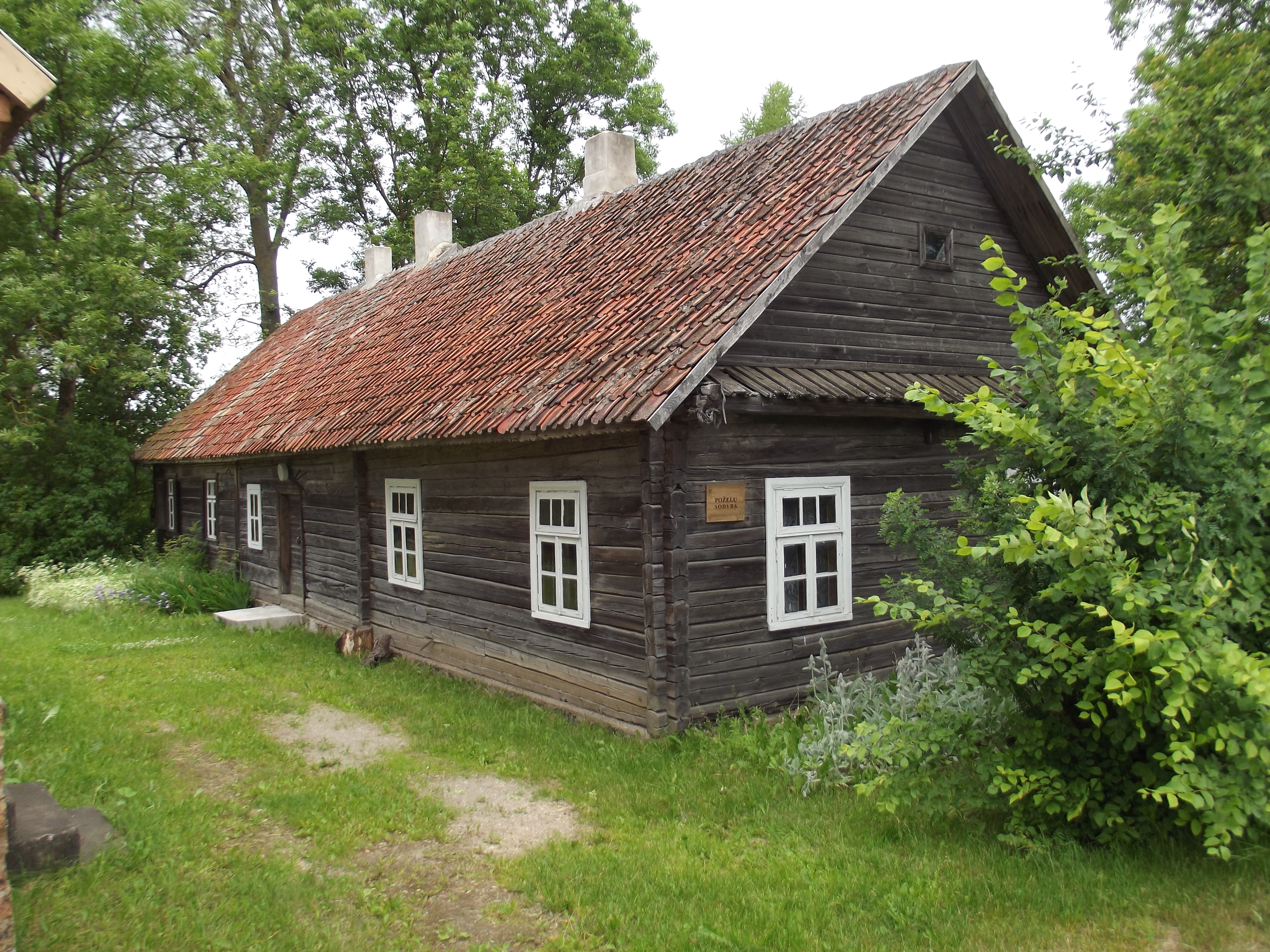
House where Požela was born

Požela was born in the Bardiškiai village near Žeimelis to a family of well-off farmers. From 1906 to 1915, he was a student at the Mitau Gymnasium. He participated in various student activities and got acquainted with Julius Janonis. After graduation, he enrolled at the University of Tartu to study medicine. There, he became more interested in communism and joined the Russian Social Democratic Labour Party (bolsheviks) in autumn 1916. Požela helped to establish the Tartu section of the party and illegally published various communist brochures. After the February Revolution, he became a member of the Tartu soviet. The university was closed in February 1918 and Požela returned to his native Bardiškiai, where he organized local communist groups (cells).

Požela was a delegate to the congress that established the Communist Party of Lithuania (CPL) in October 1918. At the outbreak of the Lithuanian–Soviet War and the proclamation of the Lithuanian Soviet Socialist Republic, he was sent to Šiauliai where he became deputy chairman of the city soviet. He played a role in establishing the Samogitian Regiment commanded by Feliksas Baltušis-Žemaitis and organizing a communist revolt in the city on 8 January 1919. The Red Army took over the city on 15 January. Požela was elected a member of the Central Executive Committee (parliament) of the Lithuanian SSR. However, the Soviet regime was short-lived and he moved to Joniškėlis and later to Raseiniai.

== Underground work ==
After the failure of the Lithuanian SSR, CPL and other communist organizations were outlawed in Lithuania. In Raseiniai, Požela published Darbo žodis (Labor's Word) on a weekly basis, and reestablished Tiesa (Truth) in September 1919. In April 1920, he was elected to the Central Bureau of the Communist Party of Lithuania and moved to Kaunas. He published communist Kareivių tiesa (Soldiers' Truth) and legal labor union newspaper Darbininkų gyvenimas (Life of Workers). He was the chairman of the first conference of the Lithuanian labor unions in June 1920. In September, Požela and others established a communist press which was later named Spartakas (from Spartacus). He joined the Central Committee of CPL in spring 1921. In October, party leadership gathered in Königsberg for the 3rd Congress of CPL. The meeting was discovered by the German police and the attendees were arrested, leaving Požela, who remained in Kaunas, as essentially the only senior officer of CPL in Lithuania.

Požela continued active party work. The Lithuanian intelligence arrested him in early 1921 and in autumn 1922, but he successfully escaped from the prison camp in Aukštoji Freda. He was sent to the 4th World Congress of the Communist International in November–December 1922 but was caught at the Poland–Russia border and imprisoned for three months in Švenčionys. In early 1923, CPL was reorganized and it established the Politburo (based in Moscow) and the Orgburo (based in Kaunas). Požela became a secretary of the Orgburo.

In May–July 1924, he attended the 13th Congress of the Russian Communist Party (Bolsheviks) and the 5th World Congress of the Communist International in Moscow. At the same time, CPL organized its 4th Congress. He presented on difficulties faced by the party and outlined ways of increasing its membership. In early 1926, Požela together with Zigmas Angarietis prepared and published party position and action plan on the Seimas elections in May 1926. The program called for recruitment efforts of left-wing politicians (socialists, social-democrats). Požela was arrested and imprisoned in Kaunas Prison in April–July 1926. Upon his release, he enrolled at the Faculty of Economics of Kaunas University. As CPL strengthened, it was decided to move its Politburo from Moscow to Kaunas. On 2 September 1926, Požela, Juozas Greifenbergeris, Faivušas Abramavičius, and others were elected to the Politburo.

== Execution and legacy ==
On 17 December 1926, Lithuanian military organized a coup to overthrow President Kazys Grinius and Prime Minister Mykolas Sleževičius and install Antanas Smetona. The military's rationale for the coup, which started the 14-year authoritarian regime of Smetona and his Lithuanian Nationalist Union, was that the Bolsheviks were planning a revolt that threatened Lithuania's independence and that a new stronger government was needed to eliminate this threat. As a result, some 350 communists were arrested (a number of them imprisoned in the newly established Varniai concentration camp). Six communists – Karolis Požela, Juozas Greifenbergeris, Kazys Giedrys, Rapolas Čarnas (Rafail Čiornyj), Faivušas Abramavičius, and Ipolitas Šeluga – were tried by a military court. The first four received death sentences and were shot by a firing squad on 27 December in the Sixth Fort of the Kaunas Fortress. Abramavičius was sentenced to life imprisonment (released in 1933) and Šeluga to eight years of hard labor (released in 1929). The seventh man, Pijus Glovackas, was also sentenced to death on 5 February 1927, but his sentence was commuted to life imprisonment and he was released in 1939. Historians found no credible evidence that the communists indeed were planning a coup.

Known as the four communards (Lithuanian: keturi komunarai), the four executed communists became the martyrs of CPL with annual commemorative events. In 1947, their remains were exhumed, cremated, and the burial urns were transferred to a garden of the Vytautas the Great War Museum. In 1973, a monument by sculptors Bronius Vyšniauskas and Napoleonas Petrulis was erected in Ramybė Park. The monument also acted as a columbarium for the urns. After Lithuania declared independence in 1990, the monument was removed and is now on display at Grūtas Park. The urns were buried in Šančiai Military Cemetery.

In 1965, Požela's birthplace was transformed into a memorial museum. A bust of him was erected in Pakruojis in 1971. A district, printing press, and street in Kaunas, school in Linkuva, park in Šiauliai, street in Vilnius, several kolkhozes, and other objects were named in Požela's honor. They were renamed after Lithuania regained independence. His collective works were published in 1966 and a biography by Jonas Arvasevičius was published in 1976. During his life, Požela edited at least 13 legal and 4 illegal communist periodicals and publications and published about 200 articles.

== Family ==
Initially, his brother Vladas Požela also joined communist and socialist causes, but later became a member of the Social Democratic Party of Lithuania and was briefly Minister of Internal Affairs in the government of Mykolas Sleževičius.

Karolis Požela was married twice, both times to active communists. Kotryna "Katrė" Matulaitytė (1900–1938) was a daughter of doctor and communist Stasys Matulaitis. She joined the Russian Social Democratic Labour Party (bolsheviks) in April 1917 and met Požela in October 1918. She taught history of the feminist movement at the Communist University of the National Minorities of the West in 1922–24 and worked as a correspondent of TASS in Kaunas in 1924–26. In 1929–1932, she studied at the Leningrad Institute of Economics and Finance. Upon graduation, she moved to Minsk and worked at the Belarusian Academy of Sciences. She was executed during the Great Purge. Their daughter Maja Poželaitė, born in April 1927 in Leningrad, earned a PhD in architecture and worked at the present-day Vilnius Art Academy.

Eugenija Tautkaitė (1899–1960) was the sister of Elena, wife of Vincas Mickevičius-Kapsukas. She completed courses at the Sverdlov Communist University and was sent to Lithuania for communist work where she met Požela in 1920. After imprisonment in 1922–1923, she returned to Moscow where she studied at the Communist University of the National Minorities of the West and the Maxim Gorky Literature Institute and worked at the Communist International (1929–1935). During the Great Purge, she was deported to Kazakhstan. She returned to Lithuania in 1944 and worked as director of courses for Soviet activists. She wrote and published several communist short stories and other works of fiction. Their son Juras Požela, born in December 1925 in Moscow, became a known physicist specializing in semiconductors. His grandson, also Juras Požela (1982–2016), was a member of the Social Democratic Party of Lithuania and briefly Minister of Health.

== Bibliography ==
- Bitauskas, Algis; Tamošaitis, Mindaugas (2016). "Požela Vladas". In Tamošaitis, Mindaugas; Bitautas, Algis; Svarauskas, Artūras (eds.). Lietuvos Respublikos 1918–1940 m. vyriausybių ministrų biografinis žodynas (in Lithuanian). Vilnius: Mokslo ir enciklopedijų leidybos centras. ISBN 978-5-420-01778-4.
- Jauniškienė, Gintarė (15 May 2008). "Pažyma apie Poželų šeimos fondą nr. R-938" (in Lithuanian). Lietuvos centrinis valstybės archyvas. Archived from the original on 15 May 2018.
- Kulikauskas, Gediminas (2002). "1926 m. valstybės perversmas". Gimtoji istorija. Nuo 7 iki 12 klasės (in Lithuanian). Vilnius: Elektroninės leidybos namai. ISBN 9986-9216-9-4. Archived from the original on 2020-11-01.
- Lėka, Aušra (9 March 2016). "Didžiausias, bet mažiausiai tvarus Juro Poželos privalumas". Veidas (in Lithuanian). 9. ISSN 1392-5156.
- Lesčius, Vytautas (2004). Lietuvos kariuomenė nepriklausomybės kovose 1918–1920 (PDF). Lietuvos kariuomenės istorija (in Lithuanian). Vilnius: General Jonas Žemaitis Military Academy of Lithuania. ISBN 9955-423-23-4. Archived from the original (PDF) on 2015-01-02.
- Lukšas, Aras (2015-06-05). "Išdavęs šeimą ir Tėvynę" (in Lithuanian). Lietuvos žinios.
- Mockienė, Jurgita (2010-12-06). "Póžela". Visuotinė lietuvių enciklopedija (in Lithuanian). Mokslo ir enciklopedijų leidybos centras. Archived from the original on 11 March 2018.
- Šarmaitis, Romas (1988). Lietuvos revoliucionieriai (PDF) (in Lithuanian). Mintis. ISBN 5-417-00071-X.
- Stanišauskas, Gediminas (28 December 2004). "Buvę komunistai pagerbė keturis komunarus". Kauno diena (in Lithuanian). Delfi.lt.
- Vitkus, Aleksandras; Freidmanas, Peisachas (2010-01-10). "Ar nuteisti mirties bausme keturi komunistai buvo tik keturi?" (in Lithuanian). Voruta.
