= Ramybė Park =

Former cemetery in Kaunas, Lithuania

Ramybė Park (Kaunas City Old Cemetery)
- Ramybės parkas (Kauno senosios kapinės)
- Interactive map of Ramybė Park (Kaunas City Old Cemetery)

Details
- Established: 1847
- Closed: 1959
- Location: Kaunas
- Country: Lithuania
- Coordinates: 54°53′32″N 23°55′37″E
- Type: Public
- Size: 6.02 hectares (14.9 acres)

Ramybė Park (transl. Peace or Tranquility Park, Lithuanian: Ramybės parkas) is a public park in Kaunas, Lithuania, established in 1959 in the territory of the Kaunas City Old Cemetery that was also known as the Carmelite Cemetery. The cemetery was established in 1847 and became the main city cemetery with sections for four different religions – Roman Catholics, Eastern Orthodoxs, Lutherans, and Muslims. During World War I and subsequent Lithuanian Wars of Independence, Russian, German, and Lithuanian soldiers were buried in the cemetery. During the interwar period when Kaunas was the temporary capital of Lithuania, many famous people were buried there and several buildings (churches, schools) were constructed on the cemetery's territory. In 1930, a monument to fallen Lithuanian soldiers with a tomb of an unknown soldier was unveiled. Around the same time, a tradition to honor fallen soldiers on the All Saints' Day began.

On All Saints' Day in 1956, a spontaneous anti-Soviet demonstration started in the cemetery in support of the Hungarian Revolution of 1956. After smaller incidents in 1957 and 1958, Soviet authorities decided to demolish the cemetery and turn it into a recreational park. Families were given a few months to rebury their relatives elsewhere (many were moved to the Petrašiūnai Cemetery). Tombstones, monuments, crypts and a Catholic chapel were demolished. The Soviets installed a monument with ashes of four communists executed after the December 1926 coup. After Lithuania regained independence in 1990, the Soviet monument was moved to Grūtas Park. The monument to Lithuanian soldiers was reconstructed, and new monuments dedicated to the participants of the June Uprising and Lithuanian partisans were erected.

== History ==
=== Establishment ===
People were traditionally buried in churchyards but as the population of Kaunas grew, there was a need for a new city cemetery. The cemetery was planned in 1847 together with the city's expansion east, the so-called New City (Naujamiestis) in the present-day Centras district. As it was established on land that belonged to the former monastery of the Discalced Carmelites based in the Church of the Holy Cross (closed in 1845), the cemetery is sometimes known as the Carmelite Cemetery. The cemetery was divided into plots for four religious communities: southern section for Eastern Orthodox, largest central section for Roman Catholics, northern section for Evangelical Lutherans and Muslims. It is believed that the first burial took place in 1850. The cemetery was not planned and burials were made haphazardly without clear rows or paths.

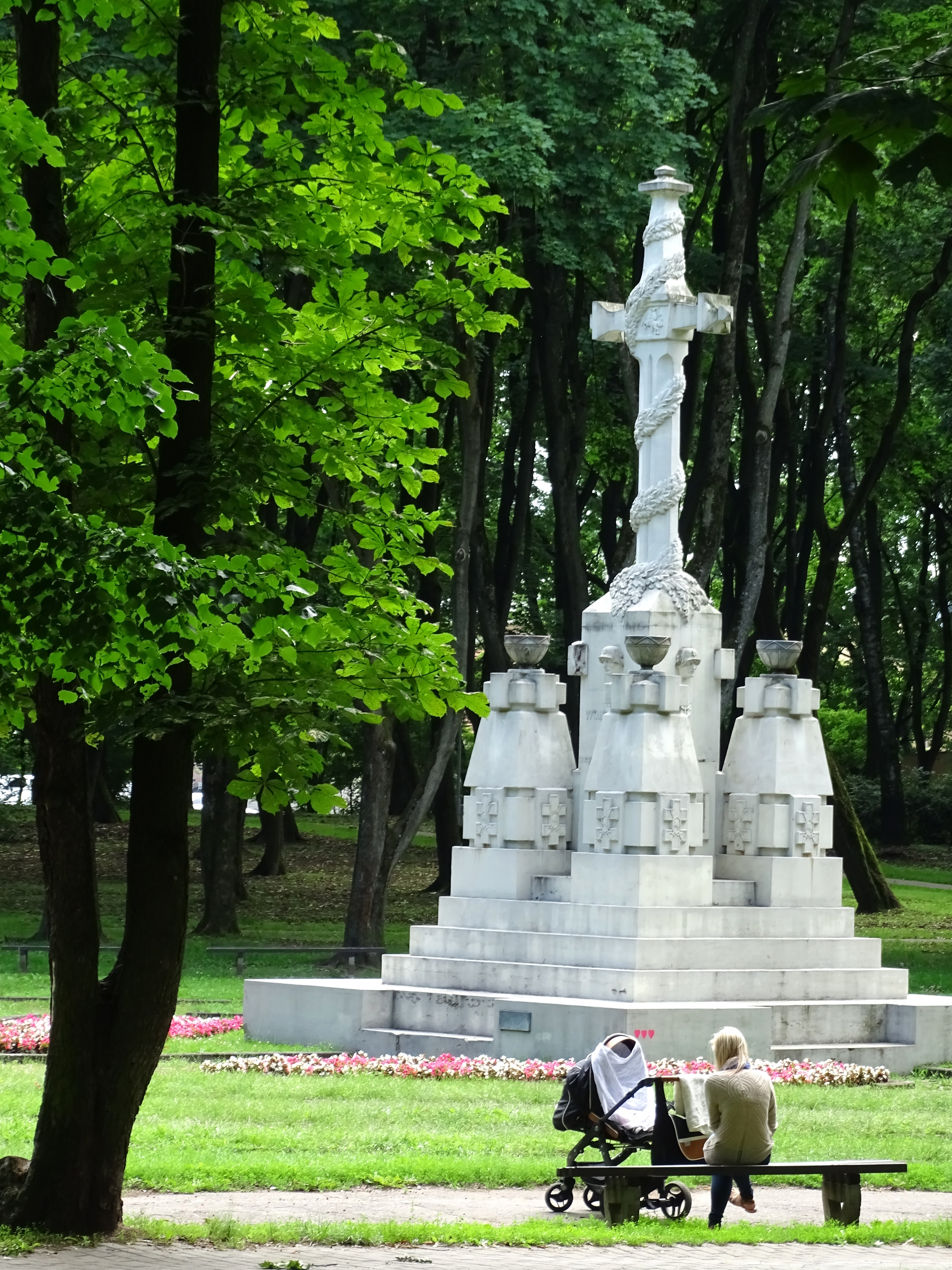
Rebuilt monument to Lithuanian soldiers

It was not an ideal location for a cemetery as it was surrounded by busy city streets and residential buildings. Discussions about relocating the cemetery started as early as twenty years after its opening, but no solutions were found.

=== Interwar ===
During World War I, hundreds of Russian, German, and Lithuanian soldiers were buried at the cemetery. Statistics about burials was collected since 1933: 507 burials in 1933, 673 in 1934, 564 in 1935, 586 in 1936, 626 in 1937, 740 in 1938, 595 in 1939. In 1920s and 1930s, several buildings (churches, schools) were constructed on the cemetery's territory. The cemetery also had various tombstones of artistic and architectural value. In 1930, a large monument was built for the fallen Lithuanian soldiers. In 1930s, there were again plans to relocate the cemetery, but the plans were delayed due to lawsuits over the cemetery's land ownership between the city municipality and the religious communities.

=== World War II ===
During World War II, there were several politically sensitive burials at the cemetery. When Germany invaded the Soviet Union in June 1941, Lithuanians organized the anti-Soviet June Uprising. 74 Lithuanian men killed in Kaunas were buried in the cemetery on 26 June. 64 of them were buried in a mass grave, others in their family plots. In spring 1941, Soviet NKVD tortured and killed 29 political prisoners (including one woman) and buried them in a plot allocated to the new Petrašiūnai Cemetery. The mass grave was discovered on 11 July 1941 and their bodies were exhumed. Victims that could not be identified were reburied in the old cemetery. In January 1944, the large public funeral of Elena Spirgevičiūtė and Stasė Žukaitė took place in the cemetery. The young women were killed by the Soviet partisans.

=== Demolition of the cemetery ===
After the death of Joseph Stalin in 1953, the cemetery became a place of passive anti-Soviet resistance, particularly on the All Saints' Day when Lithuanians visit graves of their relatives to light a candle. A particularly large anti-Soviet demonstration broke out on All Saints' Day in 1956 in support of the Hungarian Revolution of 1956. According to KGB data, 124 people were tried for participating in the demonstration. Smaller incidents repeated in 1957 and 1958. Therefore, the Soviet authorities decided to demolish the cemetery.

Relocation of some of the famous burials to the Petrašiūnai Cemetery was paid for by the government. Relatives had until June 1959 to request reburials at other cemeteries. Many bodies were moved to Petrašiunai, Panemunė, Senava, Eiguliai and other cemeteries. Many others, including some famous people, remained buried at the cemetery if no relatives submitted requests. For example, the demolished grave of General Silvestras Žukauskas has not been located despite an archaeological excavation carried out in 2012. Some relatives were afraid to identify themselves as related to some anti-Soviet activists in fear of retribution. The cemetery was bulldozed at the end of 1959. Tombstones, monuments, crypts and a Catholic chapel were demolished. Even if bodies were moved to other cemeteries, sometimes the tombstones were not relocated. For example, the tombstone of linguist Kazimieras Jaunius by sculptor Antanas Aleksandravičius was destroyed and replaced with a simple headstone.

=== Recreational park ===
The former cemetery was turned into a recreational park with new asphalt paths, children playgrounds, benches. In 1988, the park was named Ramybė Park (peace, tranquility). In 1994, after Lithuania regained independence in 1990, the park was added to the registry of cultural heritage. The monument to the fallen Lithuanian soldiers was rebuilt, a few new monuments were installed. In 1995, the park was officially renamed as Kaunas City Old Cemetery though it continues to be popularly known as Ramybė Park.

== Buildings ==
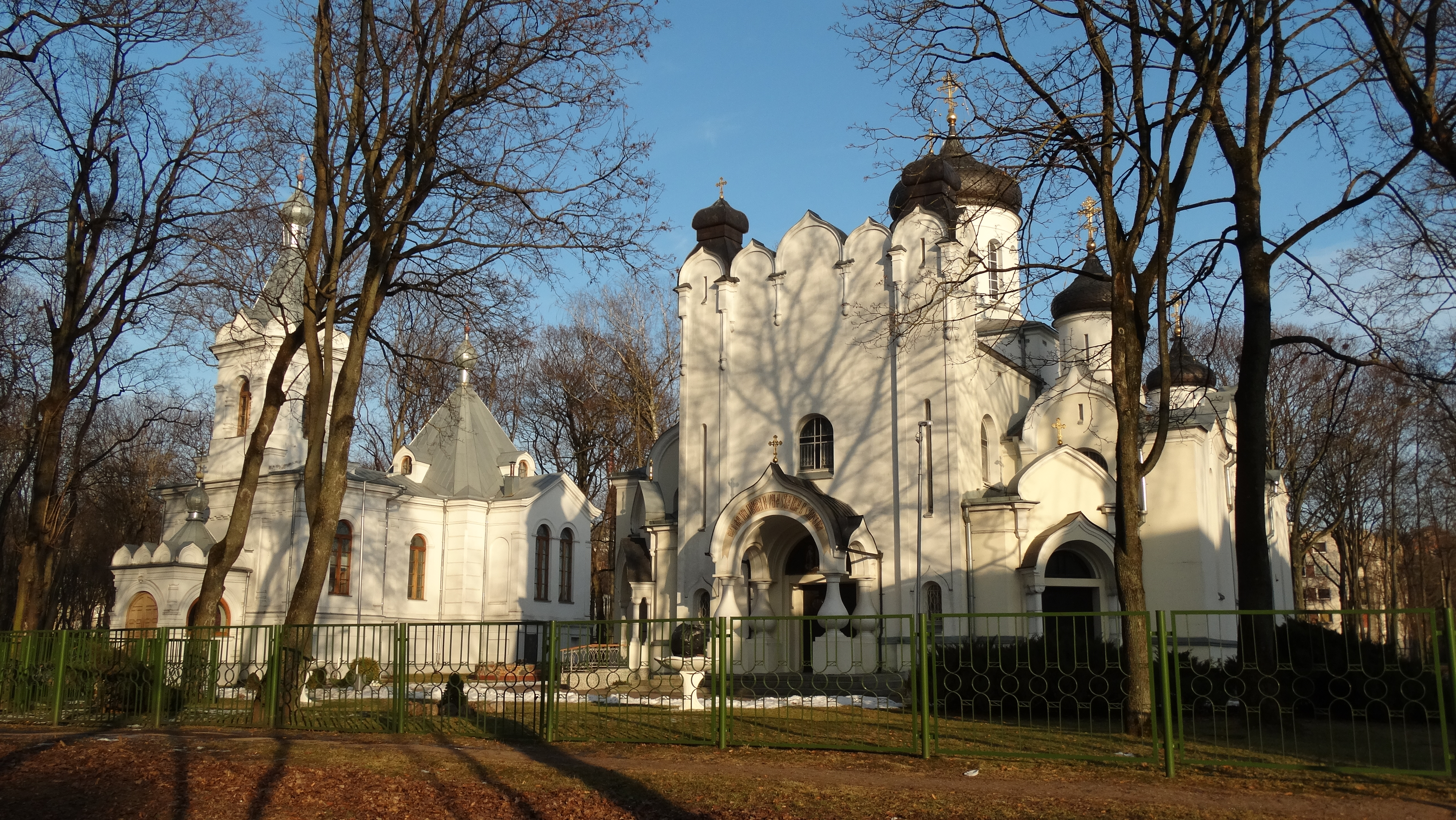
Eastern Orthodox churches in the park

In 1862, the Church of the Resurrection was built in the Eastern Orthodox plot of the cemetery. A two-floor Russian gymnasium with Neo-Russian elements was completed in 1925. It was accompanied by several wooden buildings, including a primary school and a dormitory. When the St. Michael the Archangel Church became a Catholic church, the Eastern Orthodox community needed a new cathedral. The Lithuanian government provided funds to enlarge the Church of the Resurrection, but the community decided to build the new Church of the Annunciation next to the Church of the Resurrection. The new church was consecrated in September 1935. The Church of the Resurrection was closed by the Soviet authorities in 1962. It was restored and reopened in 2000.

The Catholic plot had a wooden chapel that was moved from an older cemetery that was closed when the Carmelite Cemetery was opened. In 1934, a two-floor administrative building with a chapel was constructed in the Catholic plot. During the Soviet era, it was a post office. After the independence, housed the Museum of Resistance and Deportations until 2014.

A two-floor wooden primary school in the Lutheran plot was constructed in 1898. The Lutheran community also built a German gymnasium based on a project by a Swiss architect. The project was completed only partially. The construction started in 1922 and the students moved in 1923, but the school did not have enough space. Therefore, the school decided to build another adjacent building in 1923. The school was enlarged again by adding the third floor in 1930 based on plans by architect Vytautas Landsbergis-Žemkalnis. It now houses a Russian school.

The Muslim plot served the community of Lipka Tatars. Their plot had a small wooden mosque (built in 1860) and two small wooden buildings (residence of the Imam and a shelter). The Tatars built the new brick Kaunas Mosque which officially opened on 15 June 1933, an anniversary of the Battle of Grunwald. It remains the only brick mosque in the Baltic states. During the Soviet era, the mosque was closed in 1947 and used for various purposes including storage and library. After independence in 1990, the mosque was returned to the Islamic community and resumed religious services.

== Sculptures and memorials ==
=== Military memorials ===
One of the very few remaining original structures is a memorial to Russian soldiers who died protecting the Kaunas Fortress during World War I. The soldiers were buried in mass unmarked graves. The memorial cross was erected in 1923; it is located near the Eastern Orthodox churches. About 870 German soldiers were also buried in the cemetery. They were commemorated with a stone monument with cannons on its sides constructed in 1916. A capsule with a document signed by Field Marshall Paul von Hindenburg and other German officers was imbedded into the foundations of the monument. It was destroyed when the cemetery was closed in 1959.

About 1,000 to 1,500 people who died during the Lithuanian Wars of Independence (1918–1920) were buried in the cemetery. In 1927–1930, the Lithuanian military cleaned up these military graves (created new paths, replaced rotten crosses, planted flowers, etc.). A tradition to honor the fallen soldiers on the All Saints' Day started forming in 1927. On 27 October 1930, the 500th death anniversary of Grand Duke Vytautas, monument We Died for the Fatherland (Žuvome dėl Tėvynės) was unveiled by President Antanas Smetona and blessed by Vladas Mironas. At the same time, an unknown soldier who was killed in the present-day Latvia during the Lithuanian–Soviet War was reburied under the monument. The monument, 9 metres (30 ft) in height, depicted a sword thrusting the ground thus resembling a cross. The monument was demolished in 1956–1959. It was reconstructed (sculptor Robertas Antinis) in 1994.

=== Mausoleum of Girėnas and Darius ===
The cemetery had 37 known tombs of military aviators. Their headstones featured metal crosses shaped as airplane propellers. A mausoleum dedicated to Stasys Girėnas and Steponas Darius, Lithuanian aviators who died in 1933 attempting a transatlantic flight from New York to Kaunas, was constructed by architect Vytautas Landsbergis-Žemkalnis. It was meant as a temporary measure until the Christ's Resurrection Church was completed. On 1 November 1937, bodies of Girėnas and Darius were moved to the mausoleum. In 1941, during World War II, their bodies were removed to the Faculty of Medicine of Vytautas Magnus University and hid in 1944. They were buried in Šančiai in 1964. The mausoleum was demolished in 1959. Its underground crypt survived and was excavated in 1996. There were plans of reestablishing a memorial to the pilots, but the crypt was buried again in 2004.

=== Soviet communards ===
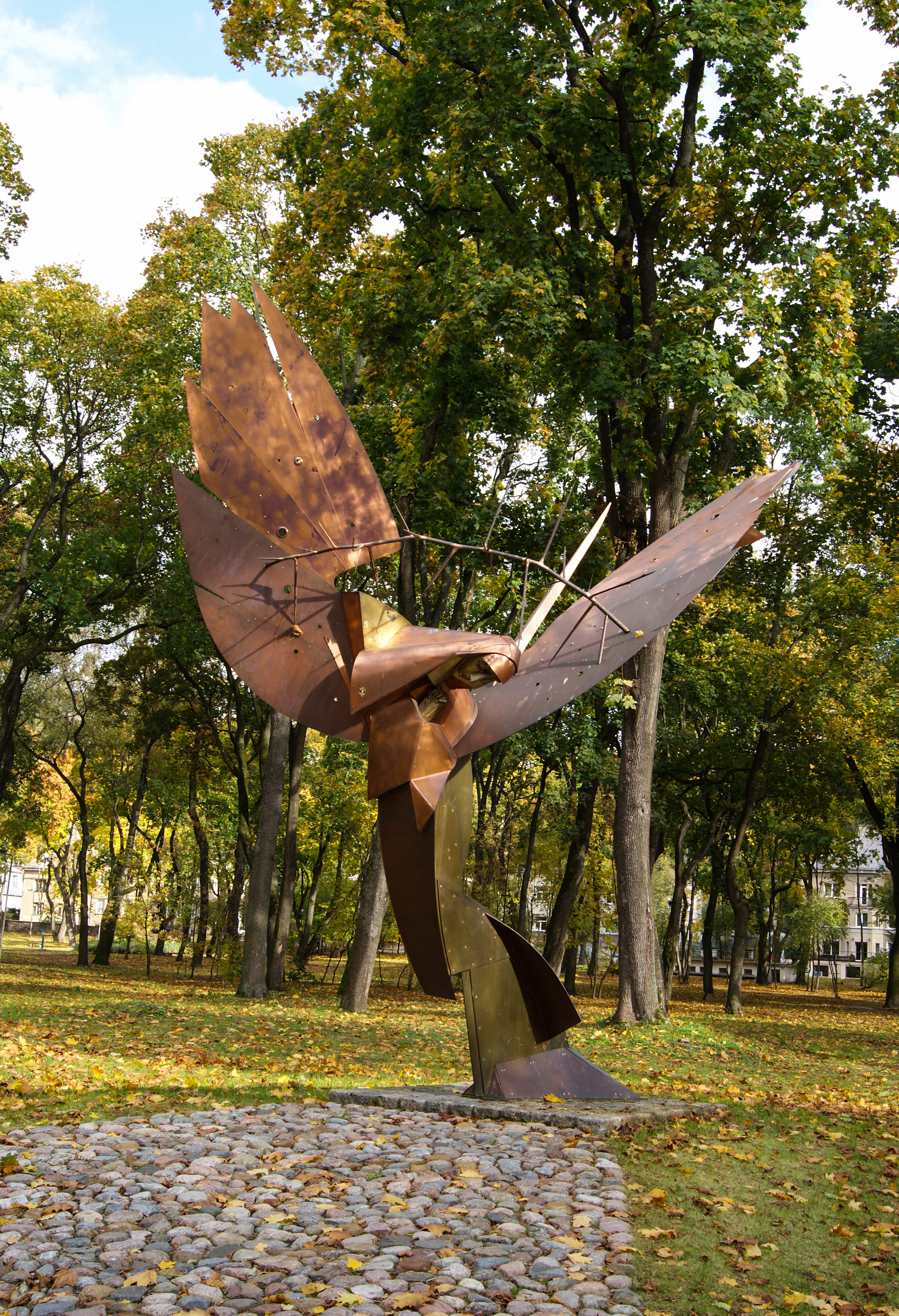
Mother of Those Who Perished for Freedom of Lithuania erected in 2010

In 1973, ashes of four communists executed after the December 1926 coup were moved to the park. Bronze sculpture Four Communards by sculptors Bronius Vyšniauskas and Napoleonas Petrulis was installed in their memory. After Lithuania regained independence in 1990, the monument was moved to Grūtas Park.

=== Lithuanian freedom fighters ===
After Lithuania regained independence in 1990, new monuments were built in the park. Monument Cross-Tree (sculptor Robertas Antinis) dedicated to the participants of the June Uprising was erected in 1991. It is accompanied by a cenotaph with last names of the rebels. In 2011, 40 small bronze crosses were placed at the location where victims of the June Uprising were buried. At the same time, new paths and lighting were installed.

In August 2010, monument Mother of Those Who Perished for Freedom of Lithuania (Žuvusių už Lietuvos laisvę Motinai) by sculptor Vidmantas Gylikis was erected at the location of the former Catholic chapel.

On 16 February 2019, the 101st anniversary of the Act of Independence of Lithuania and the 70th anniversary of the Lithuanian Partisans Declaration of 1949, the Partisan Alley was unveiled in the park. The path leading to the Mother of Those Who Perished for Freedom of Lithuania is lined with ten stelas – one introductory and one for each of the nine districts of the anti-Soviet Lithuanian partisans.

== Notable burials ==
Some of the notable people buried in the cemetery include:

- Kazys Binkis (1942), writer
- Kazimieras Būga (1924), linguist
- Jurgis Dobkevičius (1926), Lithuanian aviator
- Jonas Jablonskis (1930), linguist
- Kazimieras Jaunius (1908), linguist
- Marcė Katiliūtė (1937), painter
- Antanas Kriščiukaitis (1930), writer, judge
- Vladas Kuzma (1942), surgeon
- Pranas Mašiotas (1940), writer and educator
- Juozas Naujalis (1934), composer
- Nikolai Pokrovsky (1930), Foreign Minister of the Russian Empire
- Juozas Purickis (1934), diplomat and journalist
- Česlovas Sasnauskas (1916), composer
- Stasys Šimkus (1943), composer
- Mykolas Sleževičius (1939), Prime Minister of Lithuania
- Elena Spirgevičiūtė (1944), servant of God
- Liudmila Malinauskaitė-Šliūpienė (1928), poet
- Juozas Tūbelis (1939), Prime Minister of Lithuania
- Juozas Vokietaitis (1931), educator
- Eduards Volters (1941), university professor
- Jonas Yčas (1931), Minister of Education of Lithuania
- Juozas Zikaras (1944), sculptor
- Silvestras Žukauskas (1937), General

== Bibliography ==
- Valiokaitė, Justė (2014). Kauno senosios Karmelitų kapinės 1847-1959 m.: istoriniu, paveldosauginiu ir sociakultūriniu aspektu (Master's thesis) (in Lithuanian). Vytautas Magnus University.
