= Požela =

Požela is a Lithuanian surname that may refer to

- Juras Požela (1982–2016), Lithuanian politician
- Karl Pojello (Karolis Požėla, 1893–1954), Lithuanian professional wrestler
- Karolis Požela (1896–1926), Lithuanian communist executed in 1926
