= Edmundas Vaitekūnas =

Lithuanian politician

Chairman of the Lithuanian Radio and Television Commission
- In office 2013 – 17 September 2018
- Succeeded by: Martas Martisius (acting)

Personal details
- Born: Edmundas Vaitekūnas; 3 July 1949 (age 75); Šiauliai, Lithuania, Soviet Union
- Political party: Labor Party
- Spouse: Rita Vaitekūnienė

Edmundas Vaitekūnas (born 3 July 1949) is a Lithuanian politician, lawyer on intellectual property, and music teacher. He is a former long-term head of the Lithuanian Copyright Protection Association Agency (LATGA-A), and the former chairman of the Lithuanian Radio and Television Commission.

== Biography ==
Edmundas Vaitekūnas was born in Šiauliai on 3 July 1949.

In 1967, he graduated from Šiauliai Julius Janonis Secondary School.

In 1971, he graduated from Šiauliai Kazys Preikšas Pedagogical Institute, in a faculty of philology and acquired the specialty of Lithuanian language and literature teacher.

In 1972, he graduated from Klaipeda Faculty of Music and obtained the qualification of a conductor.

In 1973, he worked as a teacher of Lithuanian language, literature and music at Vilnius City Auxiliary School No. 2. In 1977, he was the director Vilnius City Auxiliary School No. 2. From 1982 to 1986, he was the Deputy Head of the Lithuanian Republican Division of the Copyright Agency for the Dissemination of Lithuanian Authors' Works Abroad. From 1986 to 1989, he is the Chairman of the Vilnius City Culture Workers' Trade Union. From 1989 to 1991, he was the Deputy General Director of the Lithuanian-Polish joint venture Laura.

Since 1991, Vaitekūnas was the General Director of the Agency of the Lithuanian Copyright Protection Association (since the beginning of the establishment of this organization). He was authorized by Lithuanian government in 1992, and held negotiations with the leadership of the Soviet Copyright Agency in Moscow on the transfer of property and documentation to Lithuania.

In 1992, Vaitekūnas had studied copyright at the U.S. Congressional Studies Center in Washington DC. In 2004, he graduated from the Institute of Journalism of the Faculty of Communication of Vilnius University and acquired the specialty of public relations and spokesperson.

In 2007, his agency headed received an ambiguous public reaction, making efforts to get the founder of Grūtas Park, Viliumas Malinauskas to pay a fee to the authors of the sculptures that worshiped the Soviet era in that park.

By the decision of the Council of Authors in 2011, he was awarded the LATGA-A Gold Star for his personal contribution to the formation of the first copyright supervision entity in the history of Lithuania, the national system in this field, normative acts.

Vaitekūnas participated in the 2012 elections to the Seimas of Lithuania, represented the Labor Party (Justiniškės constituency No.7).

In 2013, the Vilnius District Court had ended a defamation case in which Vaitekūnas, the former head of the Lithuanian Copyright Protection Agency (LATGA-A), accused the singer and composer, Raigardas Tautkų and his life partner Žanetas Daubarytė of publicly defaming him.

Vaitekūnas is one of the Lithuanians sanctioned by Russia in May 2015 during the Russo-Ukrainian war. Inn 22 May 2015, Vaitekūnas had been speculated that he would be the Minisister of Education and Science. On 10 June 2015, he stated that "broadcasts of another Russian channel may soon be stopped"

On 13 September 2018, the Seimas unanimously accepted Vaitekūnas' resignation as the chairman of the Lithuanian Radio and Television Commission. He resigned on 17 September, citing to the commission that he did have fluency in foreign languages, and has been temporarily replaced by his deputy chairman, Martas Martisius,.

12 December 2018, the LRTK had passed a resolution, and had decided to apply to the Seimas for the revocation of Vaitekūnas from the members of the commission, while not informing the decision to the public.

A spokeswoman for the head of the parliament, Karolina Frolovienė said on Monday, "the Secretariat of the Speaker of the Seimas has received this letter from the commission last week and forwarded it to the Seimas Culture Committee for review."

Vaitekūnas himself had informed BNS on Sunday that he had decided to resign from the LRTK on 4 January, as his colleagues' connections with broadcasters may give rise to doubts as to whether the LRTK's decisions are lawful. He resigned on 6 January.

On 18 February 2019, Vaitekūnas had intended to run for the Vilnius City Municipal Council with the Labor Party.

== Personal life ==
He is married to Rita Vaitekūnienė, who is a prosecutor of the 1st Division of Extremely Serious Crimes of the Vilnius Regional Prosecutor's Office. They have three children: a son Erikas, who is a businessman, and two daughters, Monika, and Ema. Monika works as a manager, while Ema is a schoolgirl.

He makes music, and is the conductor of Šiauliai Big Band Orchestra). He love art, (organized several exhibitions of paintings), and motorsport (multiple participant and winner of the Lithuanian Rally Championship). He speaks Russian and English, although it was revealed he lacked the fluency of those languages that prevented him going to important events which led to his resignation.
