= Kaunas Museum for the Blind =

Museum in Kaunas, Lithuania

Coordinates: 54°53′48″N 23°55′15″E

- Muziejus neregiams
- Established: 2005
- Location: Kaunas, Lithuania
- Type: Art museum

The Kaunas Museum for the Blind (Lithuanian: Muziejus neregiams) is an art and cultural museum in Kaunas, Lithuania that opened in 2005. It was the first museum for the blind in the Baltic States and one of the first in Eastern Europe. The museum's collection includes art by blind and visually impaired artists, and objects related to blind life and culture. The museum is located in the catacombs beneath St. Michael the Archangel Church.

== Collections ==
The museum's collections include art created by blind and visually impaired artists, and objects related to blind life and culture. Objects include "audio equipment used for reading publications...samples of products made by companies staffed by the blind, and literary works written by blind authors," as well as "models of the Vilnius Cathedral and the Palace of the Grand Dukes of Lithuania". The exhibits can be perceived through sound, smells, and touch.

== History ==
The museum, located in the catacombs underneath St. Michael the Archangel Church, was created during the course of an international exchange project, "Catacombs of the 21st Century", organized by students at the Kaunas University of Technology, under the supervision of the sculptor Robertas Antinis. Students from Greece, Turkey, and Hungary also participated in the process. It opened in 2005. It was the first museum for the blind in the Baltic States and one of the first in Eastern Europe. The museum allows sighted people to experience "an hour in a blind person's shoes".

Due to its sole reliance on the parish for access, the museum was frequently inaccessible during the late 2000s.
