= Lithuanian People's Aid Union =

The Lithuanian People's Aid Union (Lithuanian: Lietuvos liaudies pagalbos sąjunga or LLPS, Yiddish: פֿאָלקס-הילף פאַרבאַנד אין ליטע), also known as Lithuanian Red Aid before 1940, was an organization in Lithuania active from end of 1918 to June 1941. The organization was commonly referred to as 'MOPR' per the Russian acronym of its international counterpart, the International Red Aid. The Lithuanian Red Aid movement raised funds and donated money, food, clothes and shoes to imprisoned communists. Just like the Communist Party of Lithuania, the Lithuanian Red Aid was illegal in Lithuania during the interwar period.

== Names ==
Over the year, the organization was known under several different names:

- 1918–1922: Red Cross (Raudonasis kryžius), Political Red Cross of Lithuania (Politinis Lietuvos raudonosis kryžius) and Lithuanian Workers' Red Cross (Lietuvos darbininkų raudonasis kryžius).
- 1922: Lithuanian Red Cross to Rescue Prisoners of the White Terror (Lietuvos raudonasis kryžius Baltojo teroro kaliniams gelbėti)
- 1923: Lithuanian Red Aid Society (Lietuvos raudonosios pagalbos draugija).
- 1924–1939: Lithuanian Red Aid (Lietuvos raudonoji pagalba).
- 1940–1941: Lithuanian People's Aid Union

== Activities ==
The organization was founded upon a decision of the first congress of the Communist Party of Lithuania and Belorussia in October 1918. The organization joined the International Red Aid (MOPR) in 1922.

In 1925, the Communist Party of Lithuania took measures to strengthen and expand activities of the Red Aid. According to Soviet sources, that year the organization distributed aid worth some 25,000 Lithuanian litas to prisoners and another 10,000 litas→ to prisoners' families. In January 1925, the Red Aid established the legal Society for Prisoner Aid. It was chaired by Germaine Geelens-Smolski (Žermena Smolskienė; widow of Jurgis Smolskis) and A. Šuvalienė. It was closed in January 1927.

By 1931, the organization was estimated to have 145 members. In 1934, according to Soviet sources, it had 400 members. With the new popular front line of the communist movement that emerged from the 7th World Congress of the Comintern in 1935, the organization grew in influence. The Lithuanian Red Aid was the most prominent pro-communist organization in Lithuania as of the second half of the 1930s. According to communist sources, the organization claimed 2,500 members in 1935. Per another account, cited in Sabaliūnas (1972), the organization had 1,250 members in 1936. In the second half of 1935, the organization raised 19,681 Lithuanian litas from donations within Lithuania, 3,600 litas from MOPR Moscow HQ, and 126 litas from abroad. The following of the Lithuanian Red Aid was leftist, but not exclusively communist. There were also businessmen contributed to the organization, presumably secure a good standing with the Soviet Union.

The first congress of the Red Aid was held in July 1935 in Kaunas. It elected union's central committee of 11 people and established 12 local chapters. The second congress of the Red Aid was held in Kaunas between December 31, 1939 and January 1, 1940. Fourteen delegates representing some 6,000 members attended the event. The Kaunas branch was represented by B. Fridmanas, C. Maginskienė and M. Domeikienė, the Ukmergė branch by A. Česnuitis, the Utena–Zarasai branch by A. Mėlynis and the Šakiai branch by J. Juodišius. The congress changed the name of the organization to the Lithuanian People's Aid Union, declaring itself as a non-party organization.

LLPS became a legal organization after the Soviet occupation of Lithuania in June 1940. By the beginning of 1941, the membership had grown to about 60,000. The organization became defunct following the German invasion of the Soviet Union.

== Publications ==
The union published several short-lived periodicals and more than 367,000 copies of 200 one-time proclamations.

The Red Aid published three issues of Yiddish Roite Hilf ('Red Aid') in 1925–1929.

In 1927, the organization began publishing the underground journal Raudonoji pagalba ('Red Aid'), but publication was promptly discontinued. Raudonoji pagalba was again published clandestinely from Kaunas in 1932–1936. In total, there were 18 issues. The editorial team of the publication consisted of B. Gensas, Barelis Fridmanas, Benjaminas Fogelevičius, Judita Komodaitė, Zalmenas Šapira, Irena Trečiokaitė-Žebenkienė and Feiga Zaraitė.

Between 1937 and 1940, the organization published 17 issues of another underground journal Į pagalbą ('To Aid') from Kaunas, with the editorial team consisting of Berelis Fridmanas, Dveira Berzakaitė, Aleksas Maginskas. After the Soviet occupation, it was turned into a legal monthly publication. Ten issues were published between August 1940 and May 1941.

== Secretaries and chairpersons ==
During the interwar, the union was headed by secretaries (later chairs) of its central committee. They were (in alphabetical order):

- Girša Abramavičius
- Dveira Berzakaitė
- Berelis Fridmanas
- Kazys Giedrys
- Juozas Greifenbergeris
- Chasė Krilovaitė-Freidienė
- Čilė Maginskienė (1940—1941)
- Romanas Pileris
- Abromas Plakchinas
- Karolis Požela
- Zelmanas Šapira
- Ilja Šmerkovičius
- Eugenija Tautkaitė
- Etė Vinikaitė (1933–1934)
- Feiga Zaraitė
