= Samogitian Regiment (RSFSR) =

8th Lithuanian Red Rifle Regiment
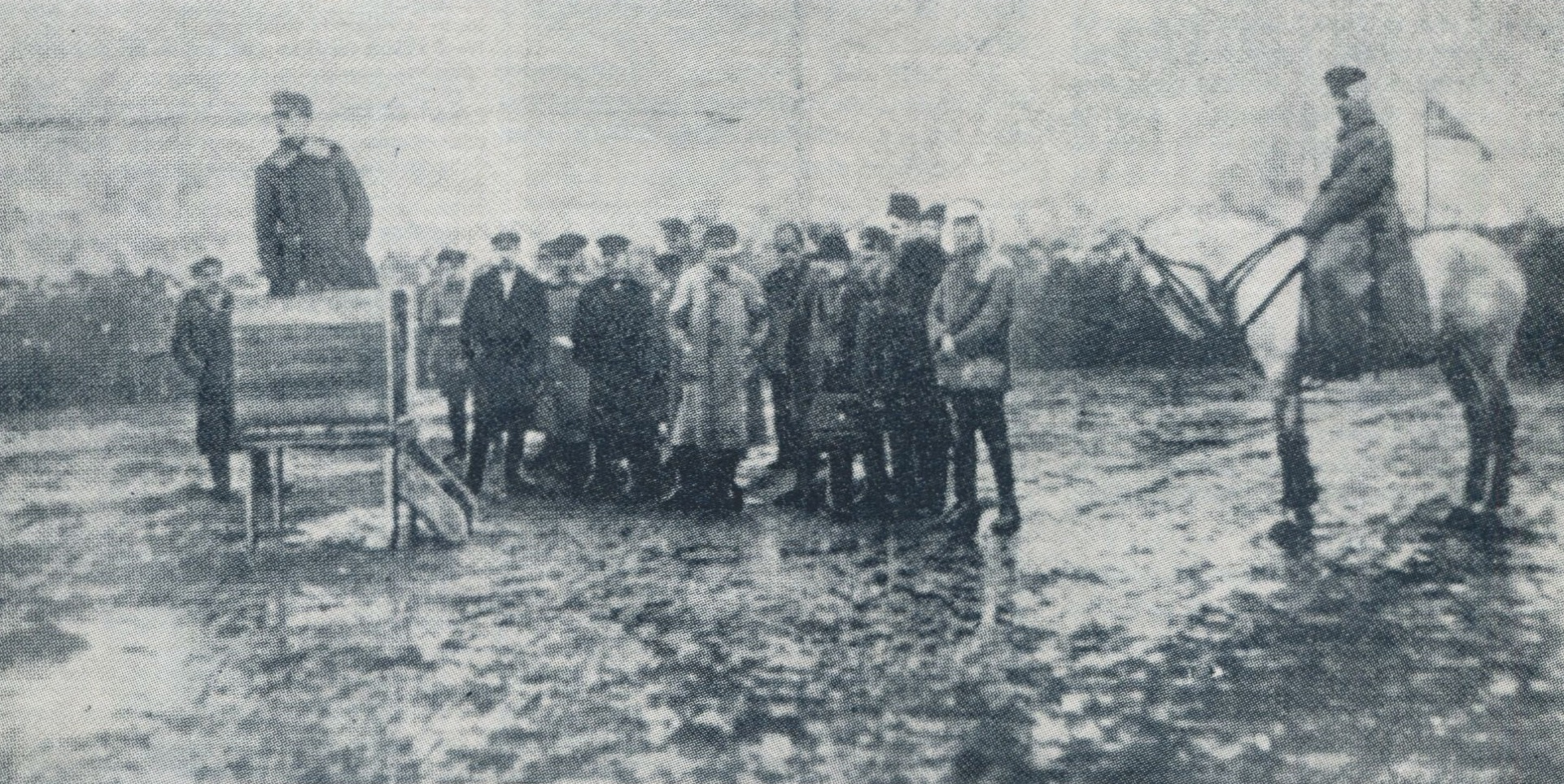
- The regiment's commander speaking from a makeshift tribunal in the middle of a field
- Active: January–April 1919
- Country: Soviet Russia
- Engagements: Lithuanian–Soviet War

Commanders
- First and only commander: Feliksas Baltušis-Žemaitis

The Samogitian Regiment (Lithuanian: Žemaičių pulkas), known as the 8th Lithuanian Red Rifle Regiment (Lithuanian: 8-asis lietuvių šaulių raudonasis pulkas) from February or March 1919, was a short-lived Red Army unit. Most sources say that it was formed in January 1919, while being disbanded in April, a mere three months later. The unit centred on Šiauliai.

== Formation ==
VLE states that the unit was formed on the order of the Communist Party of Lithuania on 1 November 1918. Other sources suggest that it began in January or on 14 February 1919. The regiment included Russian POWs, Russian Old Believers, German deserters, and criminals. Resentment of the German occupation played an important role in motivating locals to join. One source states that an important factor in why some joined was their lack of knowledge surrounding the formation of the Lithuanian Army and them being tricked by Feliksas Baltušis-Žemaitis, who declared that he was forming a Samogitian regiment to defend Lithuania, hiding his Communist intentions. According to VLE, mostly workers from Šiauliai and its surroundings joined the unit. The soldiers were armed with Russian weapons, but received no uniforms and only had civilian clothing.

== Composition ==
In January and February 1919, the regiment had about 1,000 members. It was divided into two infantry battalions, one cavalry squadron, machine-gun group and mortar teams. At one point in time, the unit had 10 heavy machine guns and one armoured train. However, when the Red Army's Red Latvian riflemen arrived in Šiauliai in late February, they took away the armoured train from them. They also tried taking away the best horses and the Žemaitis' car, but when he refused, Leon Trotsky himself was involved in this issue. The Red Army's arrival instantly soured relations with local inhabitants.

== History ==
In February, this unit was assigned to the 2nd Latvian Rifle Division. The regiment was defeated in the Battle of Luokė on 27 February 1919. After this defeat, in which some soldiers were killed, most fled to their homes, although a third of the regiment went to Šiauliai. They soon left Šiauliai because of German entry on March 11. So, the remnants of Samogitian regiment retreated to Joniškėlis. In Joniškėlis, they encountered the famous Joniškėliai partisans. The Samogitian Regiment's soldiers were disappointed, hungry and tired, and after listening to the teacher J. Bičkūnaitė and other partisans, were inspired to rebel against the Communists and put down their rifles. In fact, some of those that rebelled later joined the Lithuanian Army. Some volunteered to join the partisans, while those who did not wish to do so were free to go home. On 16 March 1919, what remained of the unit was incorporated into the Red Army's Lithuanian Division. Just a month later, in April, the regiment was disbanded. According to VLE, the unit had 400-500 soldiers. The most military-worthy parts were dispersed through other divisions.

== Commander ==
Throughout the unit's existence, it was commanded by Feliksas Baltušis-Žemaitis. His deputy was A. Arlauskas and political commisar was S. Grybas.

== Evaluation ==
One of the Lithuanian encyclopedias says that: "The attempt to form a communist regiment from Lithuanians was unsuccessful."
