= Bronius Vyšniauskas =

Lithuanian sculptor

Bronius Vyšniauskas (1 May 1923 in Gelnai, Kėdainiai – 27 June 2015 in Vilnius) was a Lithuanian sculptor. He was an Honored Art Worker of the Lithuanian Soviet Socialist Republic (1963), People's Artist of the Lithuanian SSR (1973), and a recipient of the Lithuanian SSR State Prize (1973).

In 1947, he graduated from Kaunas Decorative and Applied Arts Institute. Beginning in 1947, he participated in exhibitions. Starting in 1948, he taught at the Vilnius Art Institute (now Vilnius Academy of Arts), becoming a professor in 1978.

== Notable works ==
- Manufacturing and Construction (1952, Green Bridge, Vilnius, together with Napoleonas Petrulis);
- Four Communards (1973, Kaunas, now Grūtas Park, together with Napoleonas Petrulis);
- Mother of Kryžkalnis (1972, Kryžkalnis, now Grūtas Park);
- Busts of Alexander Pushkin (1955, Vilnius) and Kazimieras Būga (1986, Dusetos);
- Tomb monuments of Jonas Biliūnas (1958, Anykščiai), Vincas Kapsukas, Pranas Eidukevičius, Feliksas Baltušis-Žemaitis (1959, Novodevichy Cemetery, Moscow) and Povilas Višinskis (1971, Rasos Cemetery, Vilnius);
- Sculptural portraits of Julius Janonis (1962), Kristijonas Donelaitis (1965);
- Decorative sculptures Ratnyčėlė and Motherhood (1959, Druskininkai), Industry (1975, Panevėžys), Girl (1986, Klaipėda);
- Compositions Minute of Rest (1957), Mother and Child (1965), Eglė (1979).

== Gallery ==
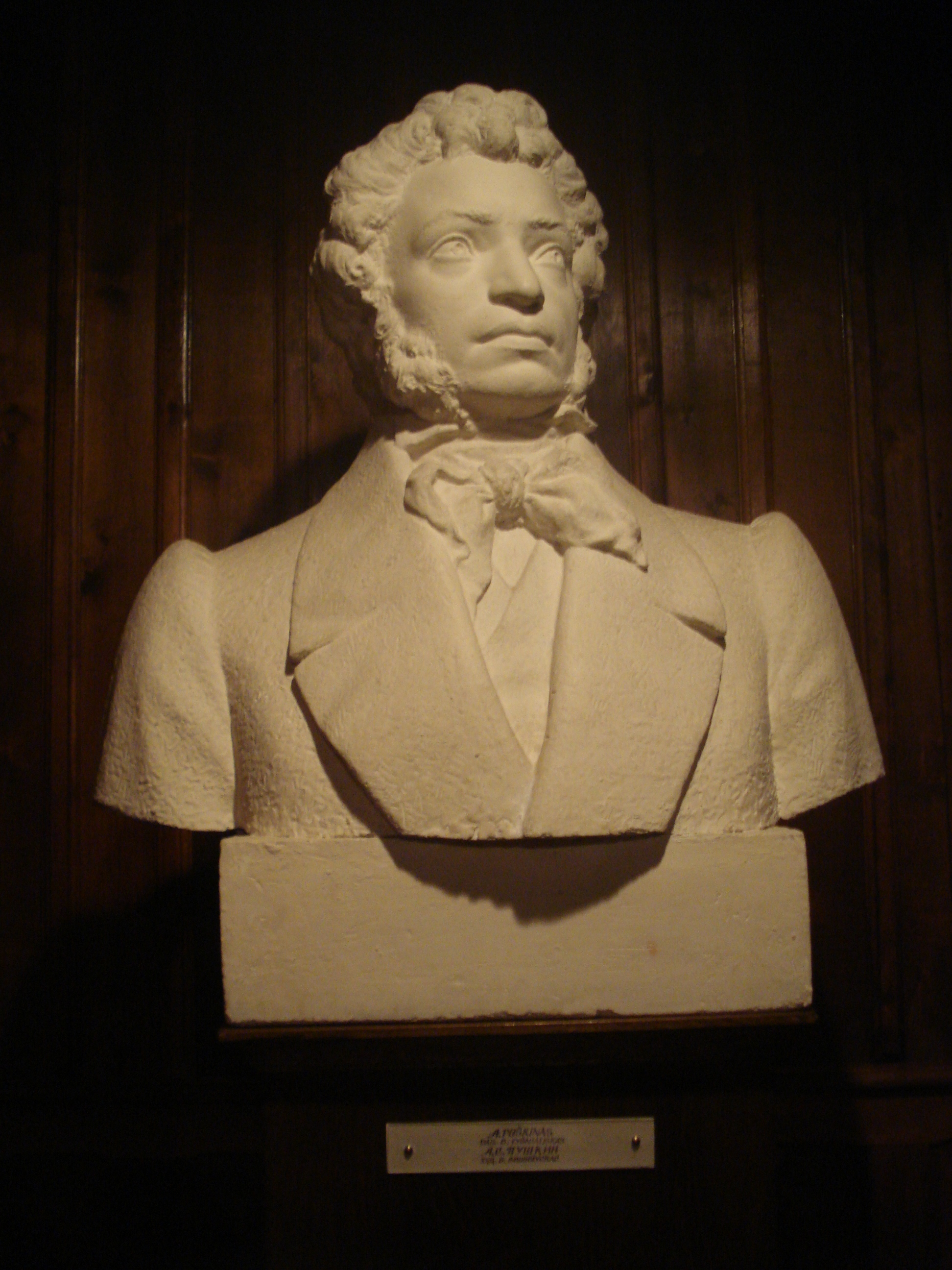
Puskin

== See also ==
- List of Lithuanian artists
