= Kazys Giedrys =

Lithuanian revolutionary and communist activist

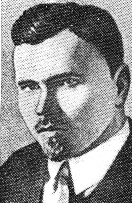
- Born: 15 March 1891; Salos, Russian Empire
- Died: 27 December 1926 (aged 35); Kaunas Fortress, Lithuania
- Cause of death: Execution by firing squad
- Political party: Russian Social Democratic Labour Party (bolsheviks); Communist Party of Lithuania

Kazys Giedrys (15 March 1891 – 27 December 1926) was a Lithuanian revolutionary and communist political activist.

Born in Lithuania, Giedrys was a factory worker in the United States before moving to Petrograd in 1917. He joined the Russian Social Democratic Labor Party (RSDLP) and supported the October Revolution. He was secretary of the Central Committee of the Lithuanian Sections of the Russian Communist Party (1921–1923) and secretary of the Central Committee of the Lithuanian Red Aid (1926). He was arrested and executed by the Lithuanian authorities after the 1926 Lithuanian coup d'état.

== Biography ==
=== Early life ===
Giedrys was born in Salos (present-day Rokiškis District Municipality) to the family of a sacristan. In 1911–1917, he worked at furniture factories in the United States. There he joined the Lithuanian Socialist Federation of America and contributed articles to its newspaper Kova.

=== Revolutionary ===
In June 1917, he moved to Petrograd where he joined the Russian Social Democratic Labor Party (RSDLP). In October 1917, he organized a group of Lithuanians, which fought against the participants of the Kerensky–Krasnov uprising. In 1918, he was head of the Petrograd section of the Lithuanian Affairs Commissariat under the People's Commissariat of Nationalities and head of the Petrograd Lithuanian Section of the Russian Communist Party. In 1919, he was a representative of the Lithuanian Soviet Socialist Republic at the Council of People's Commissars of the RSFSR. Giedrys was a delegate to the 8th Party Congress of the RCP (1919) and the First and Second World Congresses of the Comintern in 1919 and 1921.

From September 1919 to the beginning of 1920, he was head of the illegal local office of the Communist Party of Lithuania and Belarus in Vilnius, which was occupied by Polish forces. He was arrested in June 1920. After an exchange of political prisoners between Soviet Russia and Lithuania in March 1921, Giedrys came to Moscow. From November 1921 to February 1923, he was secretary of the Central Committee of the Lithuanian Sections of the RCP.

=== Interwar Lithuania ===
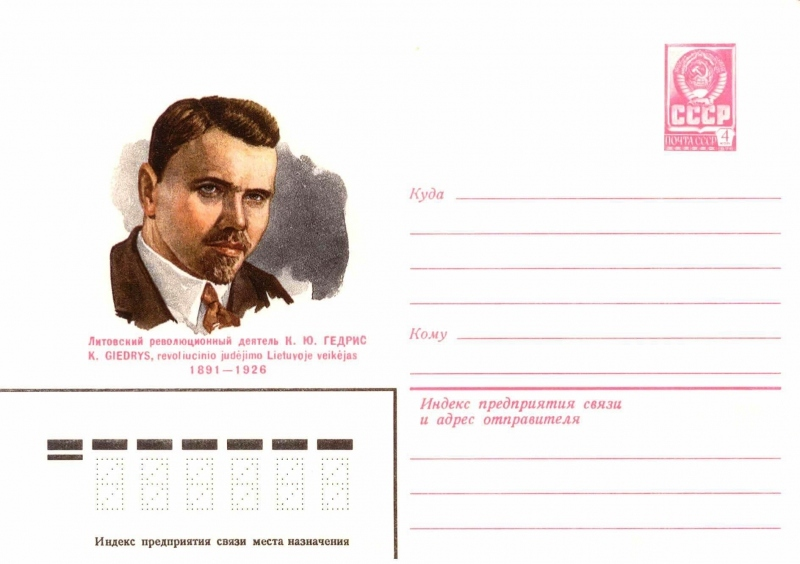
Soviet 1981 commemorative envelope of Kazys Giedrys

From October 1923, he lived in Kaunas, where he joined the Central Committee of the Communist Party of Lithuania (KPL) and continued illegal party work. In prison again from April 1924 to July 1926, he received an amnesty after the elections to the Third Seimas of Lithuania in which allowed the social democrats to form a coalition government. Giedrys became secretary of the Central Committee of the Lithuanian Red Aid.

He was again arrested after the 1926 Lithuanian coup d'état which brought Antanas Smetona to power. Along with other leading officials of the Communist Party of Lithuania, he was tried by a military tribunal on charges of preparing for a communist uprising and, together with Juozas Greifenbergeris, Rapolas Charnas and Karolis Požela, was sentenced to death. The convicts were shot on 27 December 1926 in the Sixth Fort of the Kaunas Fortress.
