= Church of St. Michael the Archangel, Kaunas =

Roman Catholic church in Kaunas, Lithuania

Church of Saint Michael the Archangel
- Garrison Church
- Švento Arkangelo Mykolo Bažnyčia; Церковь Святого Михаила Архангела
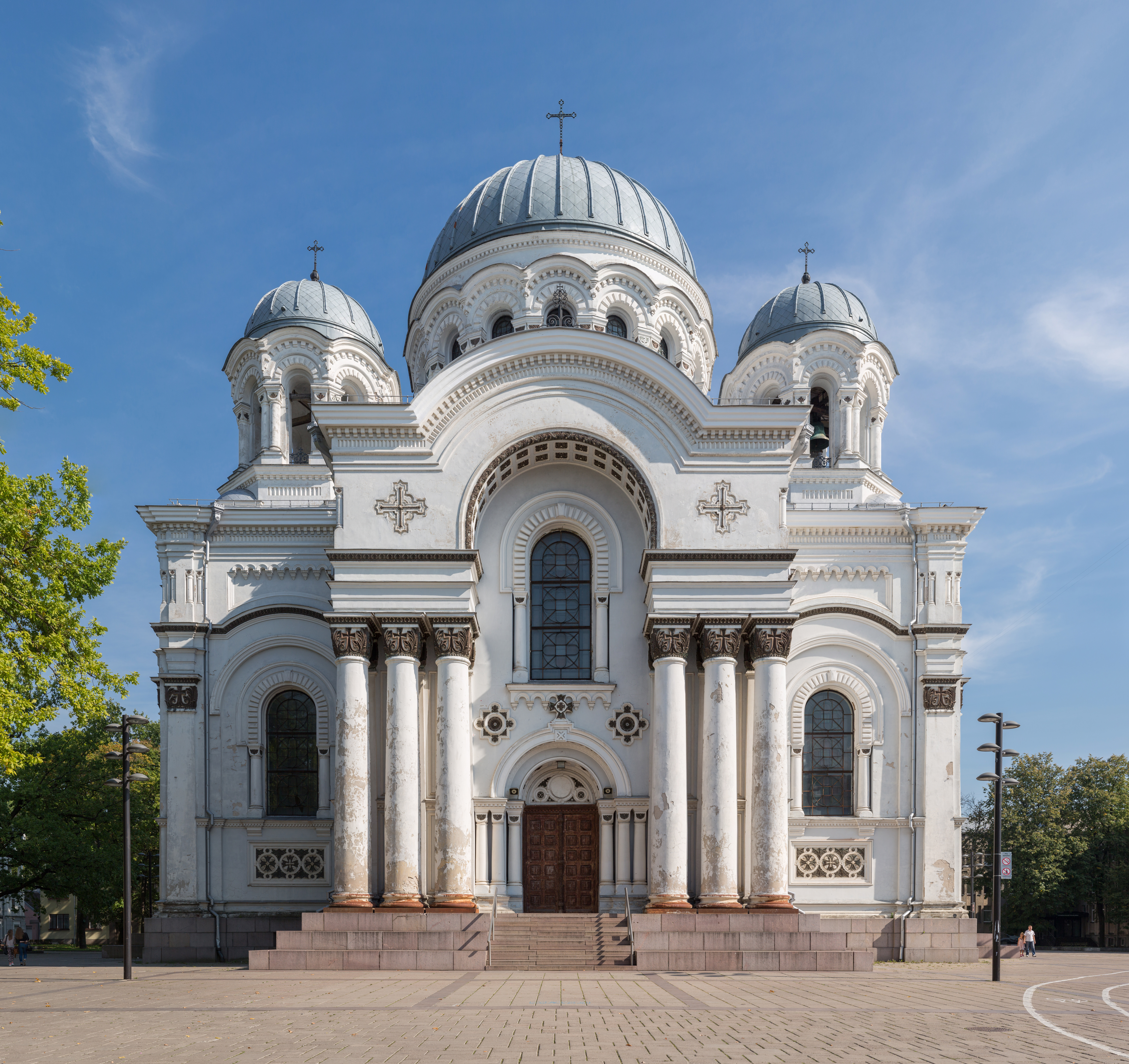

- Location of the church in Lithuania
- Church of Saint Michael the Archangel
- 54°53′49″N 23°55′16″E
- Location: Kaunas
- Country: Lithuania
- Denomination: Roman Catholic
- Previous denomination: Russian Orthodox (as built)

History
- Status: Church / Military chapel
- Founder: Military ministry of the Russian Empire
- Dedication: Saints Peter and Paul (1895); Michael the Archangel (c. 1919)
- Dedicated: 17 September 1895 (as an Orthodox cathedral); c. 1919 (as a Catholic church)

Architecture
- Functional status: Active
- Architects: K. H. Lymarenko (1895); David Grimm
- Architectural type: Cathedral church
- Style: Roman-Byzantine
- Groundbreaking: 29 June 1891
- Completed: 1895; 131 years ago

Specifications
- Capacity: 2,000 worshippers
- Height: 50 m (160 ft)
- Materials: Sandstone; granite; stained glass
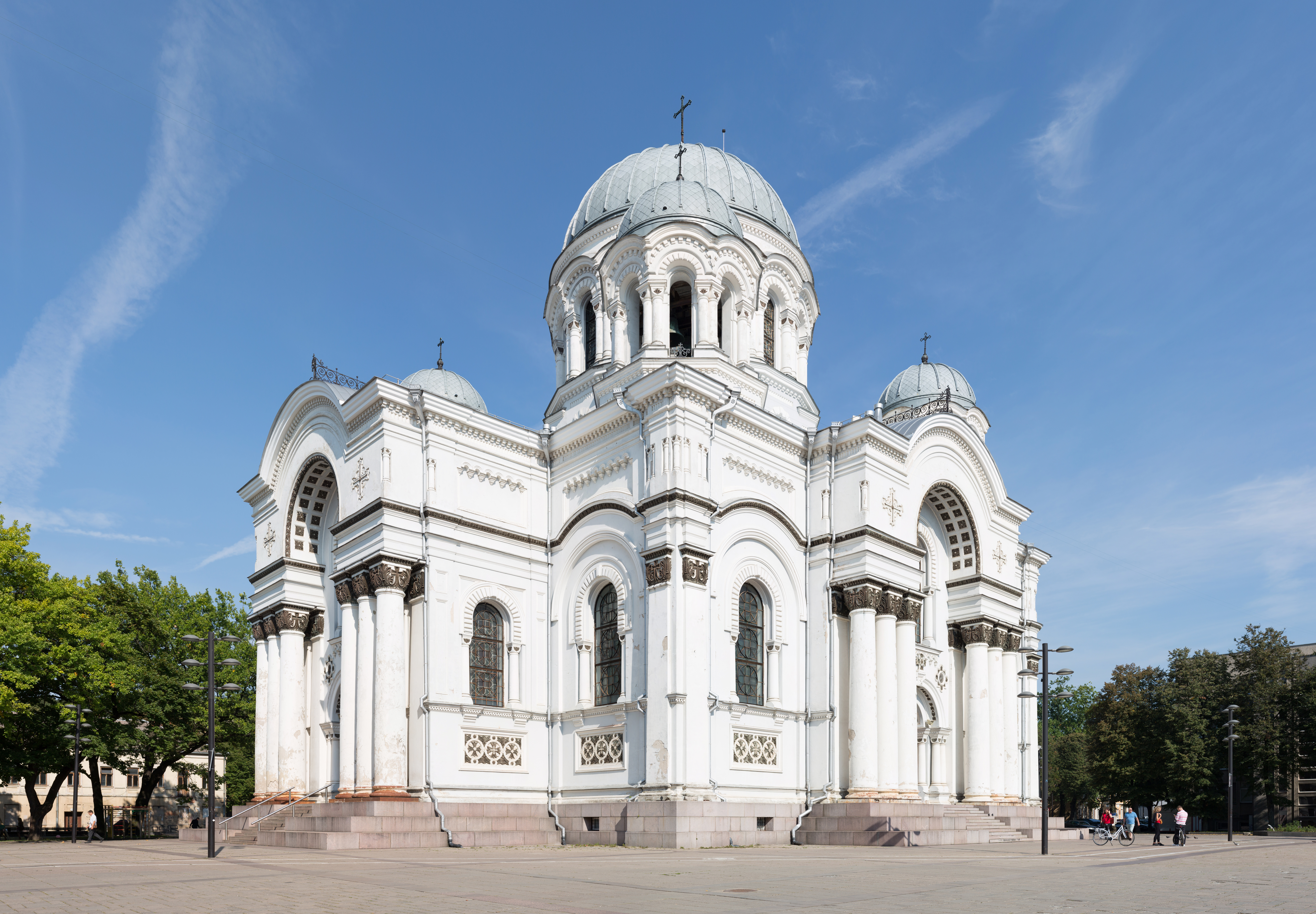
- Side view of the church
- Dome: 5

St. Michael the Archangel's Church (Lithuanian: Švento Arkangelo Mykolo Bažnyčia; Russian: Церковь Святого Михаила Архангела), also known as the Garrison Church, is a Roman Catholic church in the city of Kaunas, Lithuania, closing the perspective of the Laisvės alėja, the main pedestrian street. It was built between 1891 and 1895 when Kaunas was part of the Russian Empire, in Neo-Byzantine style largely for the use of the Russian Orthodox garrison of Kaunas Fortress.

== History ==
The construction of "military" or "garrison" Orthodox churches by the Russian government in former Polish–Lithuanian Commonwealth lands had started after the suppression of the November Uprising of 1830-31, and peaked during the reign of emperor Alexander III of Russia. Initially the site of this church had been intended to be used for a Catholic church, but these plans had been abandoned after the Uprising.

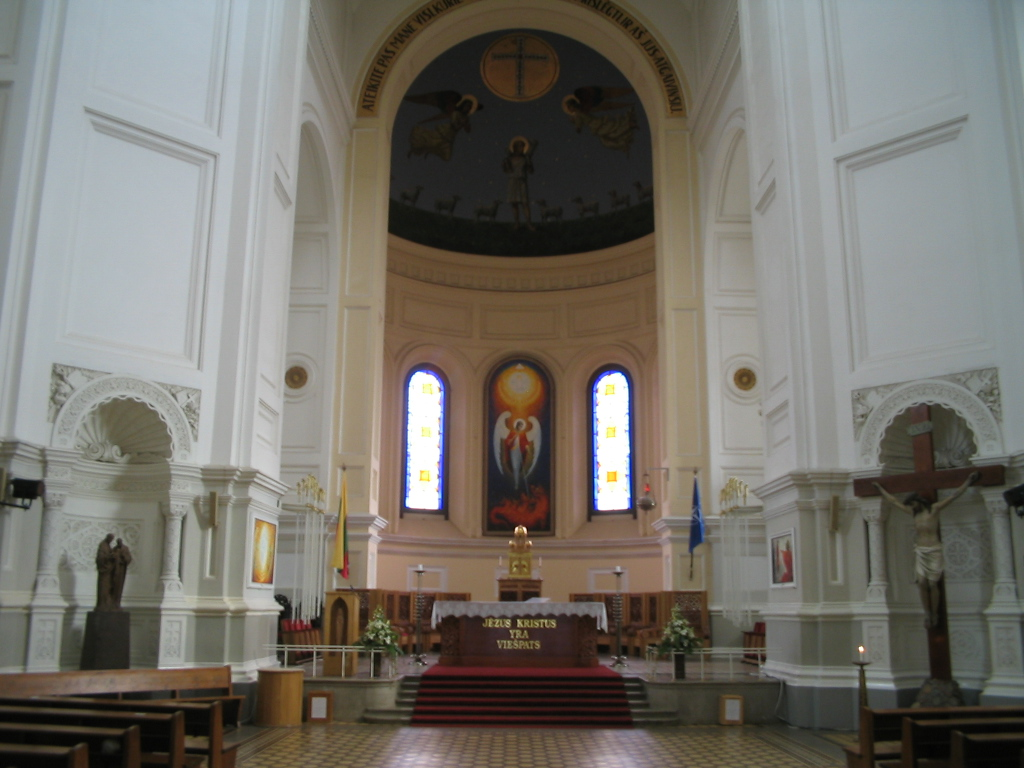
Interior of the church with Lithuanian and NATO flags.

The church was designed as an Orthodox cathedral of Saints Peter and Paul in 1890 by K. H. Lymarenko; it was authorized for construction on November 10 that year. Official groundbreaking was celebrated on 29 June 1891. The cathedral was completed in four years (unusually quickly for its size), and was inaugurated on 17 September 1895. Later Lymarenko's plan was modified by David Grimm from St. Petersburg. The church's decorative scheme was outlined by Griaznov and implemented by craftsman from Vilnius. Most of the construction was carried out by workers from Chernigov Governorate, and its art-work was implemented by craftsmen from St. Petersburg.

As usual for military churches of the period, the construction of Kaunas cathedral was financed equally by the Military Ministry and by donations from army servicemen. Completion of the church finalized the administrative building complex of the Kaunas Fortress; it symbolized less the presence of Orthodox Christians than the imperial authority of the Russian government. It was also believed that the church would reduce interdenominational frictions.

After the fall of the Kaunas Fortress during World War I the Germans cut down the church bells and transported them to Germany. The church stayed closed until 1919.

In the interwar period the cathedral became a Roman Catholic church of the Lithuanian garrison of Kaunas. There were voices urging the demolition of the church as it was labeled as without architectural value.

During the rule of the Soviet Union, it was used as an art gallery. Nowadays it serves as a Roman Catholic church. The other popular name of the church is Soboras.

== Architecture ==
Kaunas cathedral stood out among similar military churches by its size (it was designed to fit 2,000 worshipers) and its unusual architecture - employing triple Corinthian columns in an otherwise typical "neo-Byzantine" (Romanesque) five-dome design. In total the exterior has 266 large and small columns and pilasters. This eclectic spin-off of mainstream "Byzantine" architecture (the so-called Roman Byzantine style) was hailed by contemporary architectural journalists, but never gained popularity.

The cathedral is 50 metres (160 ft) high; finished in three shades of sandstone color with equal-armed cross ornament. For the interior the structure relied on four load-bearing pylons designed to appear slimmer and lighter than in reality. The space between external and internal shells of the main dome was filled with hollow clay resonators. Cut from granite, floor tesseras were bought from abroad. In the dome above the altar were images of two Archangels or evangelists. The main altar's stained glass showed God's entrance to heaven. Smaller domes housed bells; one of them had been founded in 1681. Inside the church and to the right is the entrance to the catacombs, which are accessible to the public.

== Gallery ==
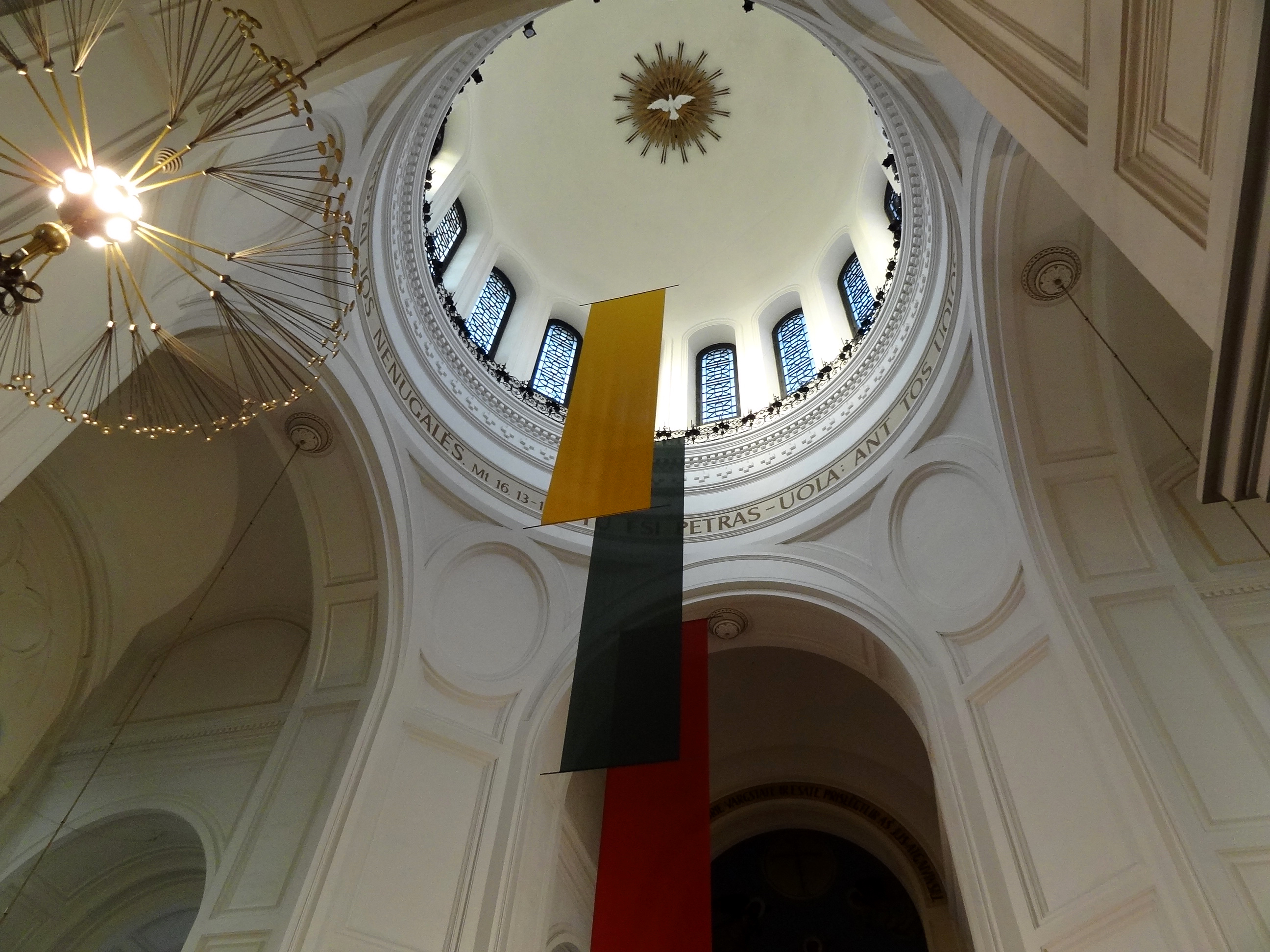
The dome from the inside and the Lithuanian flag split into three separate one-colour flags

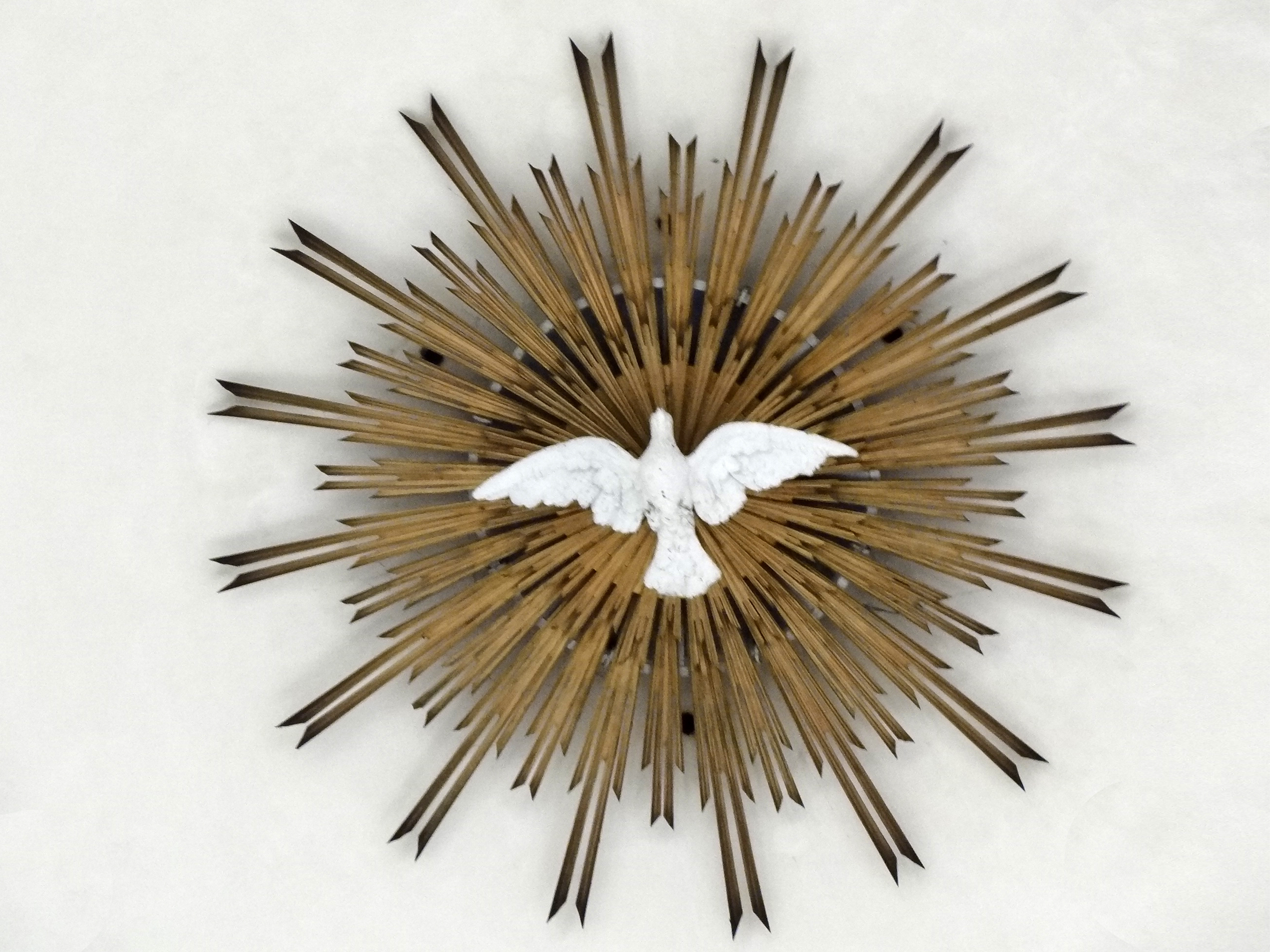
The keystone of the church with the Holy Spirit dove and Jesus rays

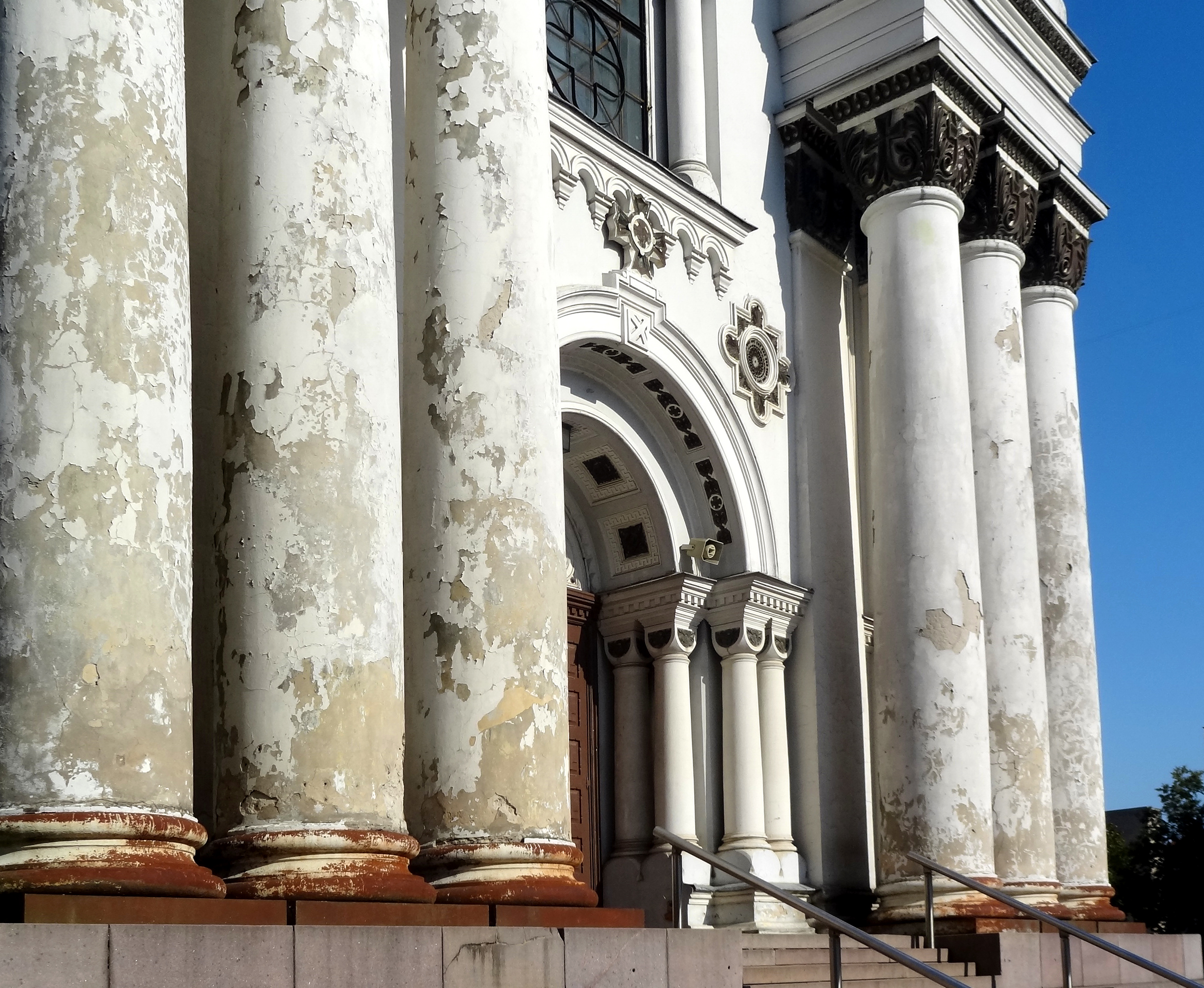
Front columns and paint flaking off

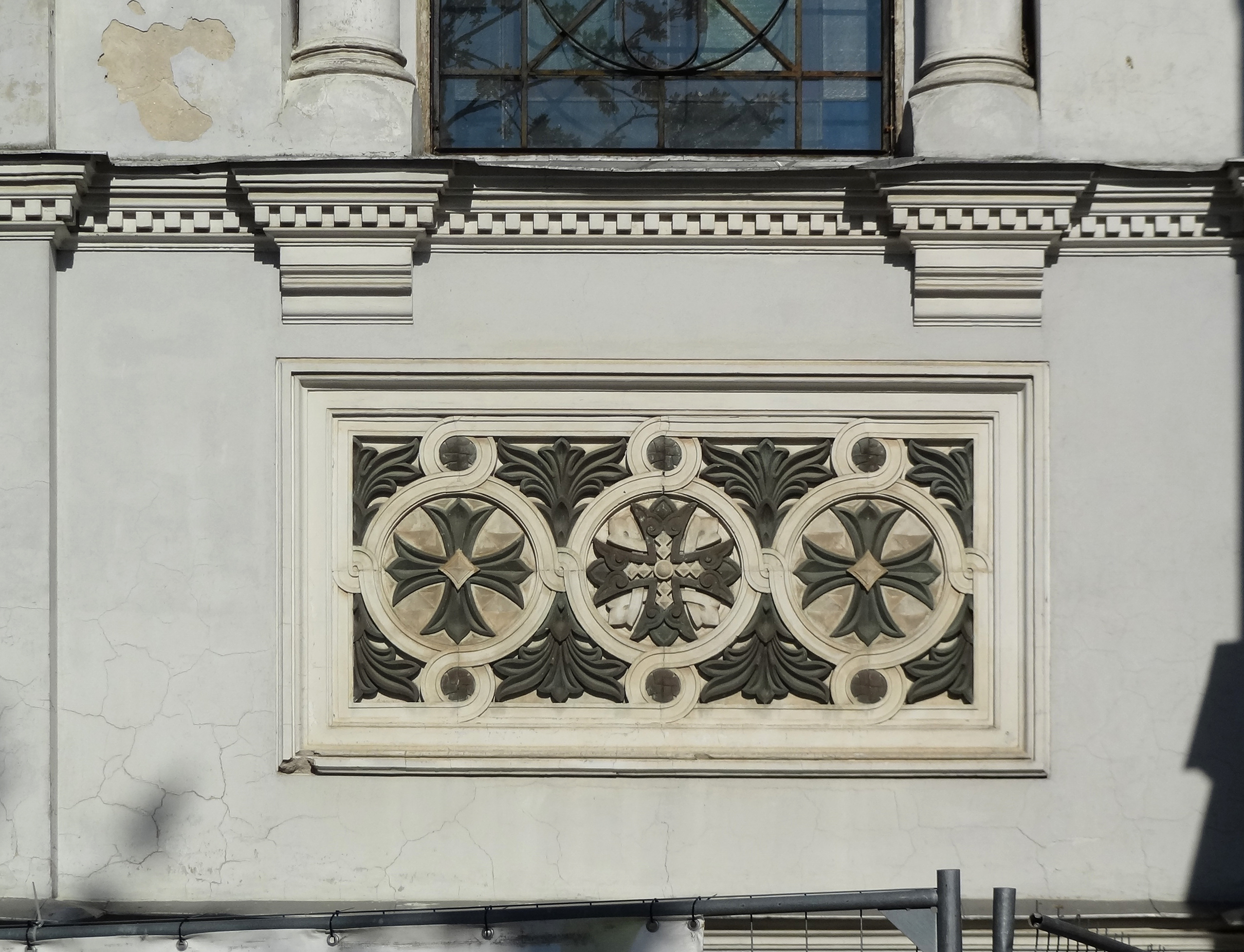
Bas-relief on the façade

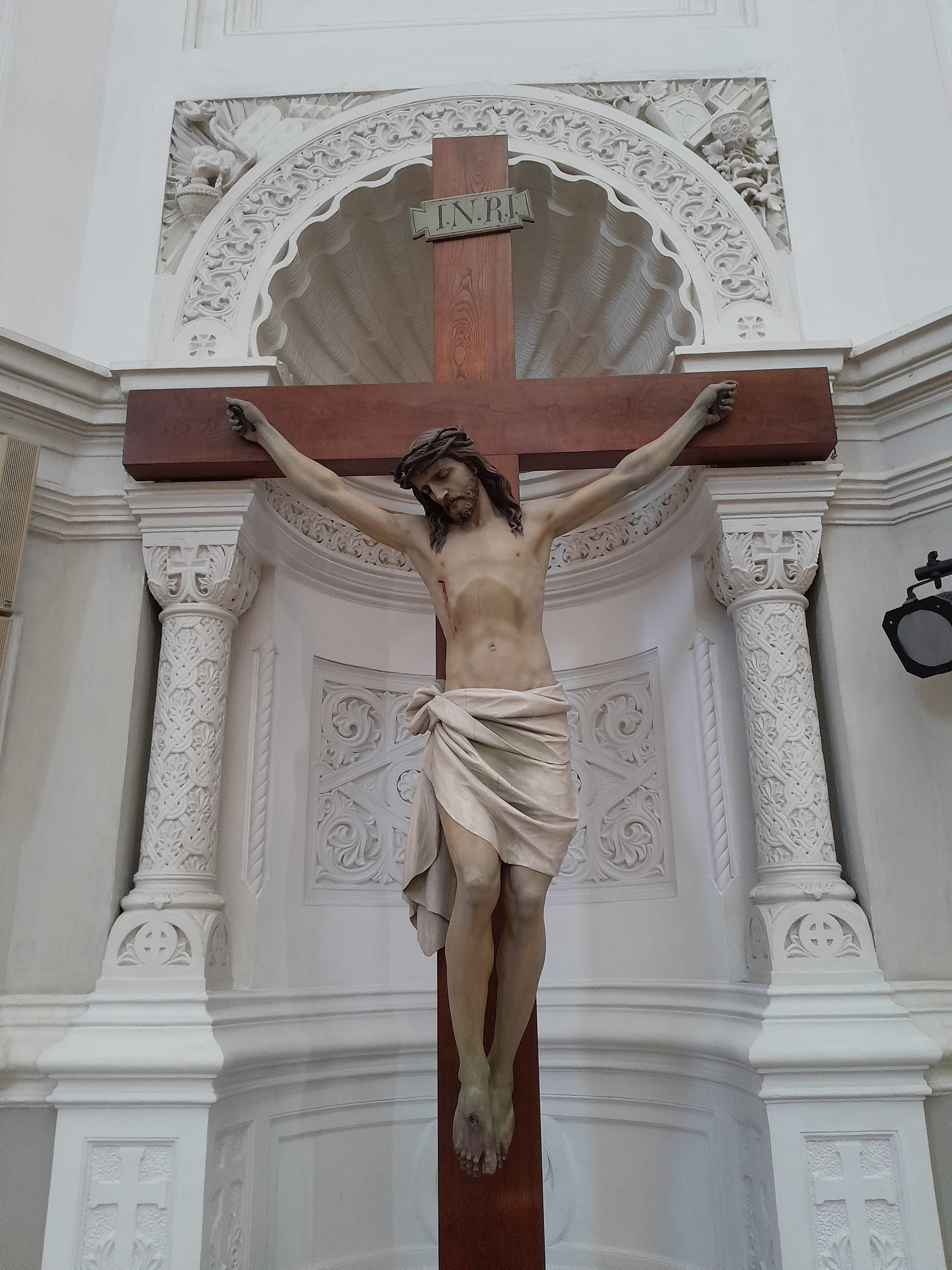
Interior

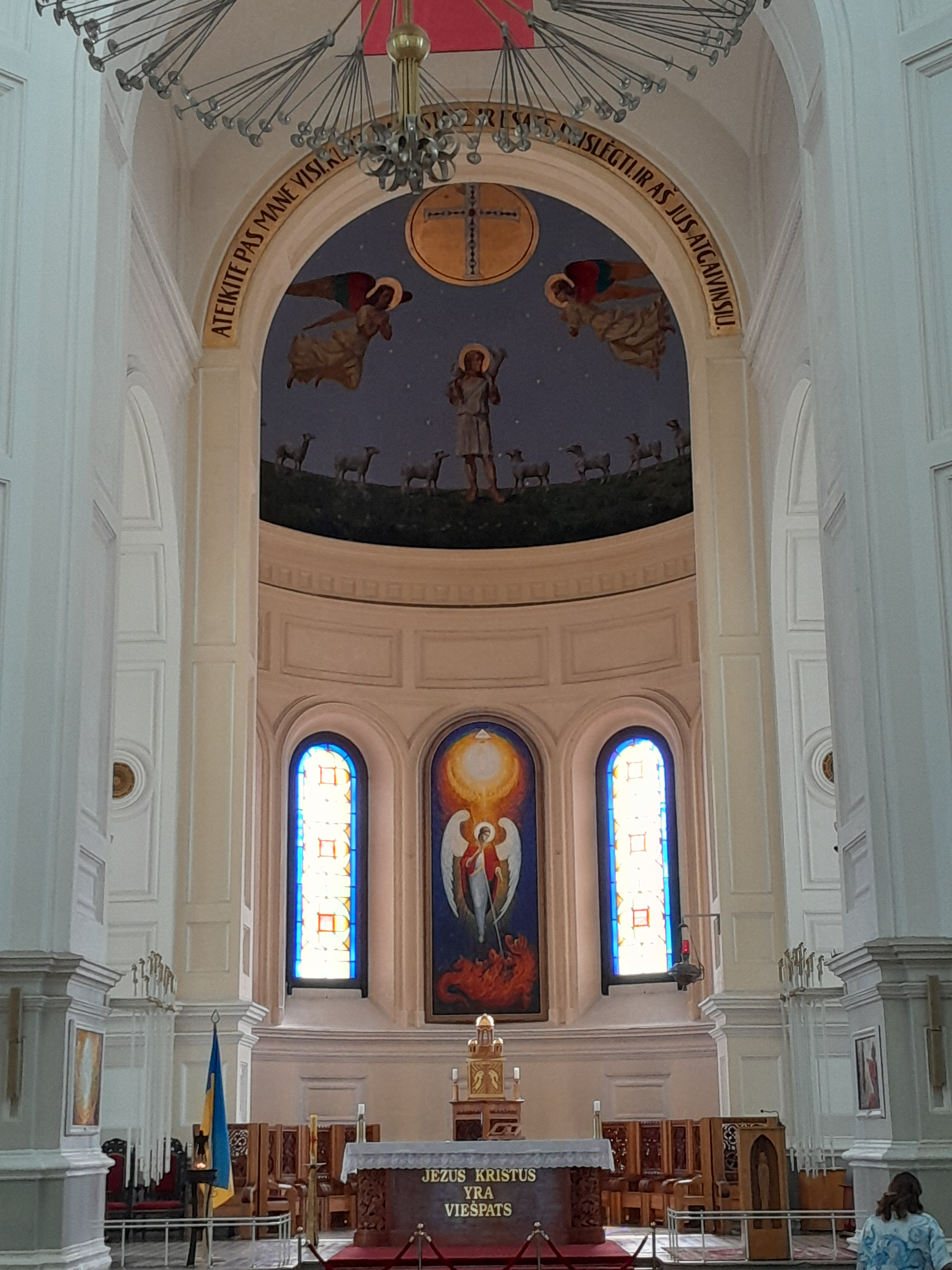
Main altar

== Museum for the blind ==
The Kaunas Museum for the Blind is located underneath the church. It originated as a 2005 art installation - "21st century catacombs" – designed for the blind, the visually impaired, and the sighted. The project was overseen by the Lithuanian sculptor, Robertas Antinis, and architect, Linas Tuleikis.

== See also ==
- Saint Michael: Roman Catholic traditions and views
- Roman Catholicism in Lithuania
