= Elena Spirgevičiūtė =

Lithuanian martyr and Servant of God (1924–1944)

Servant of God Elena Spirgevičiūtė
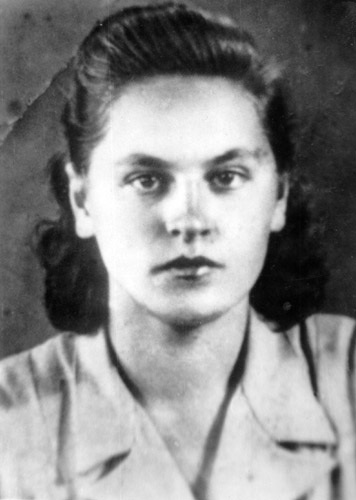
- Born: 22 December 1924; Kaunas, Lithuania
- Died: 4 January 1944 (aged 19); Tvirtovės, Kaunas, Lithuania

Elena Spirgevičiūtė (22 December 1924 – 4 January 1944) was a Lithuanian student. She was shot and killed by Soviet partisans for resisting rape. One of the four men, Alfonsas Čeponis was posthumously recognized as the Hero of the Soviet Union. She was a devoted Catholic and is recognized as a Servant of God. Her beatification case was initiated by the Archdiocese of Kaunas in 2000.

== Biography ==
Spirgevičiūtė was born in Kaunas into a family of Lithuanian workers. She was the oldest of three children. She began attending school at the age of seven and later joined the scouts movement. After finishing her primary studies, Elena was enrolled at the Saulė Society Girls' Gymnasium of Kaunas, directed by the Sisters of Saint Casimir. During the school years, she kept a diary from 2 October 1940 to 2 June 1942 which reflected her ordinary day-to-day life and connection to God. She graduated in 1943 and wanted to study medicine at the Vytautas Magnus University, but the university was closed by the occupying German authorities. She then took courses in German and French hoping to become a teacher. In fall 1943, she received a teaching assignment in Jonava, but decided to remain home due to the ongoing war.

At about 10pm on 3 January 1944, four men gained entry into Spirgevičius's home by claiming to be police officers. These Soviet partisans demanded to be given food and drank vodka that they brought. They pocketed any valuables and began harassing women for sex. Stasė Žukaitė, Spirgevičiūtė's aunt and neighbor born in 1916, heard the noise and came to investigate. When she tried to run away to get help, she was shot and killed. The men raped Spirgevičiūtė's mother and threatened Spirgevičiūtė to give in to their advances. However, she steadfastly refused. Reportedly, her last words were "Only I will die, you will live" (Mirsiu tik aš, jūs gyvensite) to her family. She was shot under the right eye. Since her right hand was grazed by the bullet, it is believed that she was crossing herself.

The murders attracted public attention. The funeral was attended by a crowd of people; an obituary of the two women was published in Kaunas daily Ateitis. They were buried in the old Kaunas city cemetery. When it was transformed into the Ramybė Park, they were reburied in the Eiguliai cemetery.

== Soviet investigation ==
In July 1958, on the 40th anniversary of the Komsomol, three members of the Komsomol from Kaunas were posthumously recognized as the Heroes of the Soviet Union, the highest military award in the Soviet Union. Among them were Alfonsas Čeponis, a Soviet partisan killed by the Gestapo on 24 January 1944. Spirgevičiūtė's mother sent a complaint to the Central Committee of the Communist Party of the Soviet Union protesting the award as Čeponis was one of the four men who raped her and killed her daughter and sister. The complaint was investigated by the Central Committee of the Communist Party of Lithuania.

The investigation acknowledged that Čeponis, a member of the Death to the Occupiers partisan group, participated in the incident. The other participants were Fedor Semenovich Tsabizov (codename Iurka), Mikhail Nikolaevich Lukianov (codename Mishka), and an unidentified partisan known only by his codename Grishka (all were killed during the war). While the report acknowledged "occasional breaches of partisan discipline", the "operation" was justified as a wartime necessity to secure food supplies. The murders of Spirgevičiūtė and Žukaitė, both attributed to Grishka, were justified "due to their links with the police" and "as an act of self-defence".

== Legacy ==
Priest Pranas Račiūnas became interested in Spirgevičiūtė's life, collected information about her, and made several copies of her diary. However, he was arrested by the MGB in 1949 and sentenced to 25 years in Gulag. In 1977, the illegal Chronicle of the Catholic Church in Lithuania mentioned Spirgevičiūtė as a martyr. In 1984, the 40th anniversary of her death, priest Krizantas Juknevičius began collecting data for her beatification. After Lithuania regained independence in 1990, it became possible to publicly commemorate Spirgevičiūtė. In 1990, Juknevičius affixed a memorial plaque with inscription It is better to die than to sin (Geriau mirti, bet nenusidėti) to the Church of St. Anthony of Padua in Kaunas. In 1992, her brother published a book Mirtis atėjo iš Muravos (Death Came from Murava) about Spirgevičiūtė and her murder. In October 1998, her brother erected a statue of an angel at the location of the house where Spirgevičiūtė was killed.

The Congregation for the Causes of Saints issued the decree nihil obstat for her beatification process on 22 October 1999. In January 2000, the Archdiocese of Kaunas under the leadership of Archbishop Sigitas Tamkevičius officially opened her beatification case.
