= Juras Požela =

Lithuanian politician

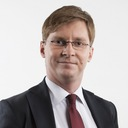
- Juras Požela

Minister of Health of Lithuania
- In office 15 March 2016 – 16 October 2016
- Preceded by: Rimantė Šalaševičiūtė
- Succeeded by: Aurelijus Veryga

Personal details
- Born: 12 April 1982 Vilnius, Lithuanian SSR, Soviet Union
- Died: 16 October 2016 (aged 34) Vilnius, Lithuania
- Party: LSDP (2000–2016)
- Education: Vilnius University
- Occupation: Politician

Juras Požela (12 April 1982 – 16 October 2016) was a Lithuanian politician who served as the Minister of Health of Lithuania from March 2016 until his death on 16 October 2016 from pancreatitis. He was also a Seimas member, Youth and Sports Affairs Committee Chairman and a presidium member of the Social Democratic Party of Lithuania.
