= Feliksas Baltušis-Žemaitis =

Lithuanian Red Army major general (1897–1957)

- Major General Feliksas Baltušis-Žemaitis
- Born: June 1, 1897; Apydimai, Kovno Governorate, Russian Empire
- Died: November 30, 1957 (aged 60); Moscow, Soviet Union
- Military career
- Allegiance: Russian Empire; Soviet Union
- Service years: 1915–1954
- Rank: Major General
- Nickname: Žemaitis
- Commands: Lithuanian Army (under Soviet occupation of 1940); 16th Lithuanian Rifle Division
- Conflicts: World War I Russian Civil War; Hamburg Uprising; World War II
- Awards: 2 Orders of the Red Banner; 2 Orders of Lenin; Various medals
- Other work: Military lecturer

Feliksas Rafailovich Baltušis-Žemaitis (Russian: Феликс Рафаилович Балтушис-Жемайтис, November 30, 1897 – June 1, 1957) was a Lithuanian Red Army major general. He participated in World War I, the Russian Civil War, the Hamburg Uprising, and World War II.

Baltušis-Žemaitis was one of the few Lithuanian officers (others included Vytautas Putna, Ieronim Uborevich, Viktoras Penkaitis) of the Imperial Russian Army who after the February and October Revolutions went to serve in the Red Army. He was a lecturer/docent at the Frunze Military Academy in 1935–1940. Baltušis-Žemaitis briefly commanded the Lithuanian Army in 1940 during Lithuania's incorporation into the Soviet Union. He earned his Candidate of Military Sciences academic degree in 1940. He was also a senior lecturer at the USSR General Staff Academy during 1940–1941 and 1943–1945, and served as the chief of USSR Supreme Command Courses 1945–1947.

== Timeline ==
- 1940: Commander in chief of the Lithuanian Army
- 1942–1943: Commanding officer of the 16th Lithuanian Rifle Division

== Awards ==
- Order of the Red Banner (twice)
- Order of Lenin (twice)
- Different medals

In 1975 a statue of Baltušis-Žemaitis was built in Šiauliai, Lithuania. After Lithuania regained its independence in 1990, this statue was taken down from its prominent position. It currently stands in the exposition of Soviet sculpture garden in Grūtas Park.
