= Robertas Antinis =

Lithuanian sculptor, performance artist, and poet

Robertas Antinis Jr. (born 9 June 1946 in Kaunas) is a Lithuanian sculptor, performance artist, and poet. He is a winner of the National Culture and Art Prize.

== Life ==
His dad, Robertas Antinis (1898-1981), was a sculptor and painter. He first created sculptures with his father, before beginning to create them on his own.

He graduated from the Applied Arts School in Riga in 1965, and the Latvian State Art Academy in 1970. He worked as a teacher at Kaunas children's art school in 1973–75. From 1997, he was a lecturer of Vilnius Art Academy, and was a docent at the Kaunas Art Institute. He has been a member of the Lithuanian Artists’ Union since 1974. He started participating in exhibitions from 1969. He is a member of the Post Ars group, who produce art installations, performances, and "happenings".

== Picture-shows ==
- 1971 Dailininkų sąjungos Kauno skyrius, Kaunas, Lithuania.
- 1987 Kauno paveikslų galerija, Kaunas, Lithuania.
- 1989 Lietuvos dailės muziejus, Vilnius, Lithuania.
- 2000 Lietuvos ambasada, Riga, Latvia.
- 2002 Lietuvos dailininkų sąjungos parodų salė, Vilnius, Lithuania.

== See also ==
- List of Lithuanian painters
