= Grūtas Park =

Sculpture garden in Lithuania

- Grūto Parkas

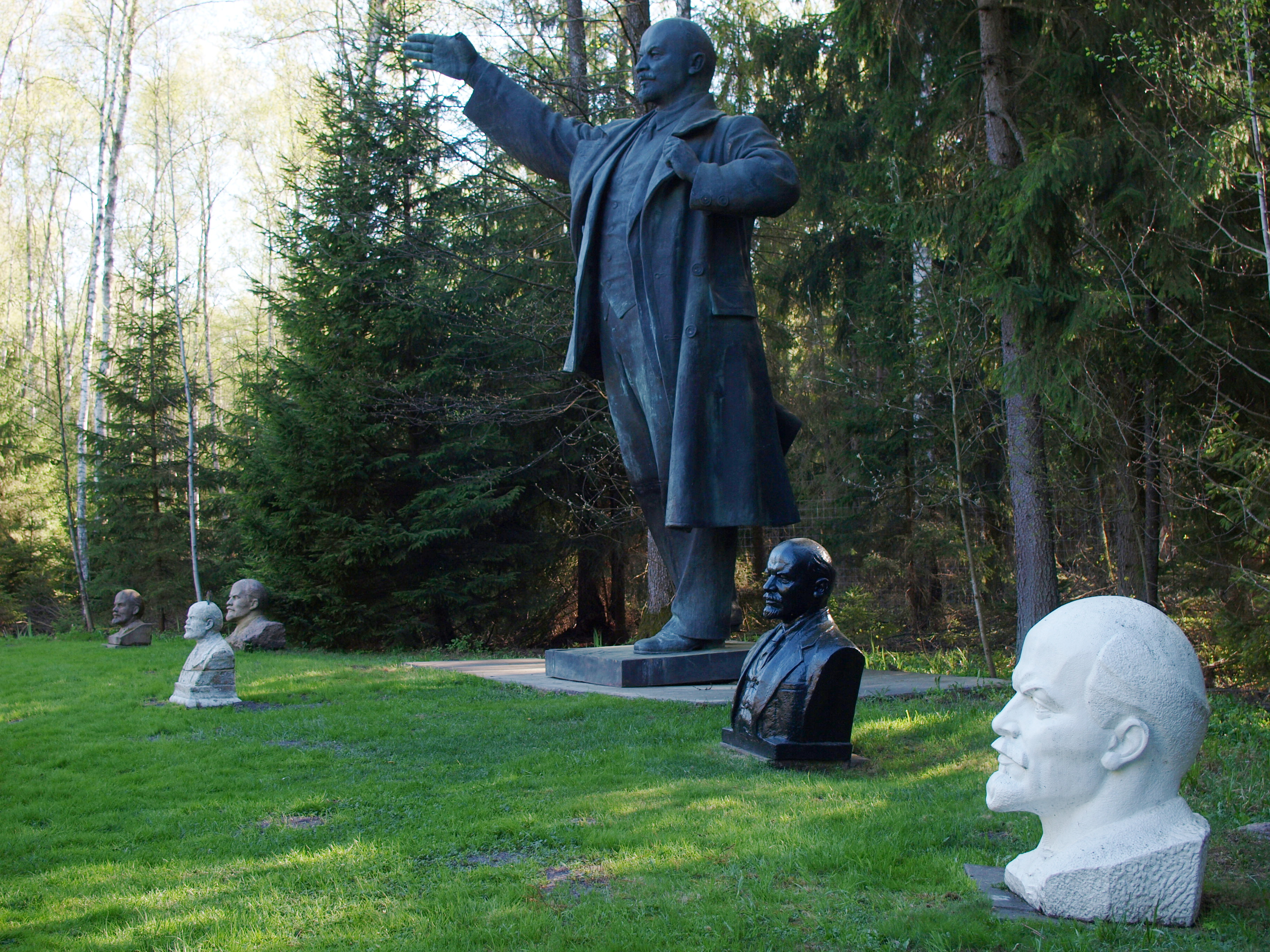
- Busts and statue of Vladimir Lenin
- Established: 2001
- Location: Grūtas, 66441 Druskininkai, Lithuania
- Coordinates: 54.022°N 24.079°E
- Visitors: 60,000
- Director: Birutė Malinauskaitė-Bark
- Employees: 22
- Website: grutoparkas.lt

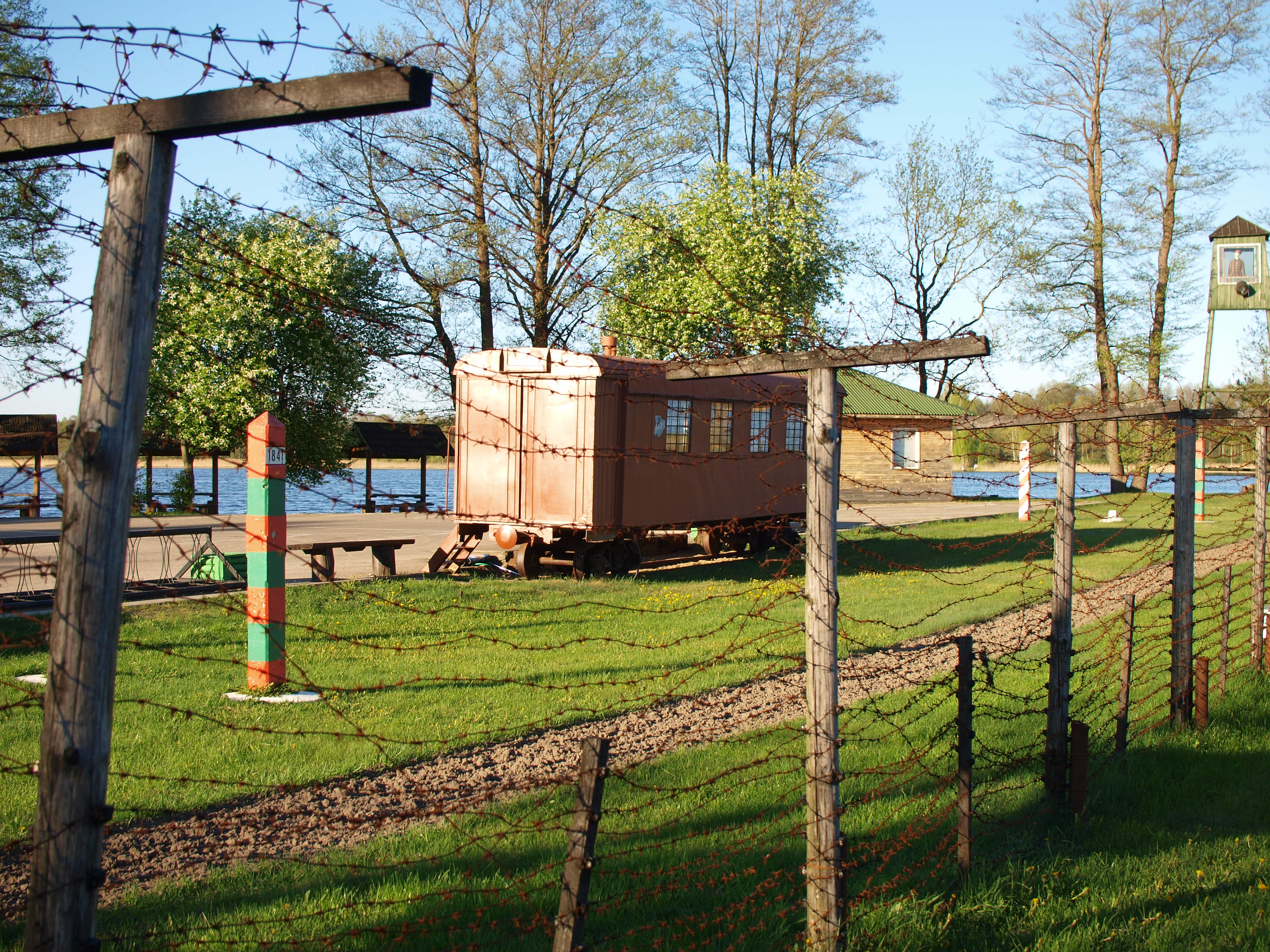
Entrance to the park with an exposition depicting the Soviet repression and the Gulag camps.

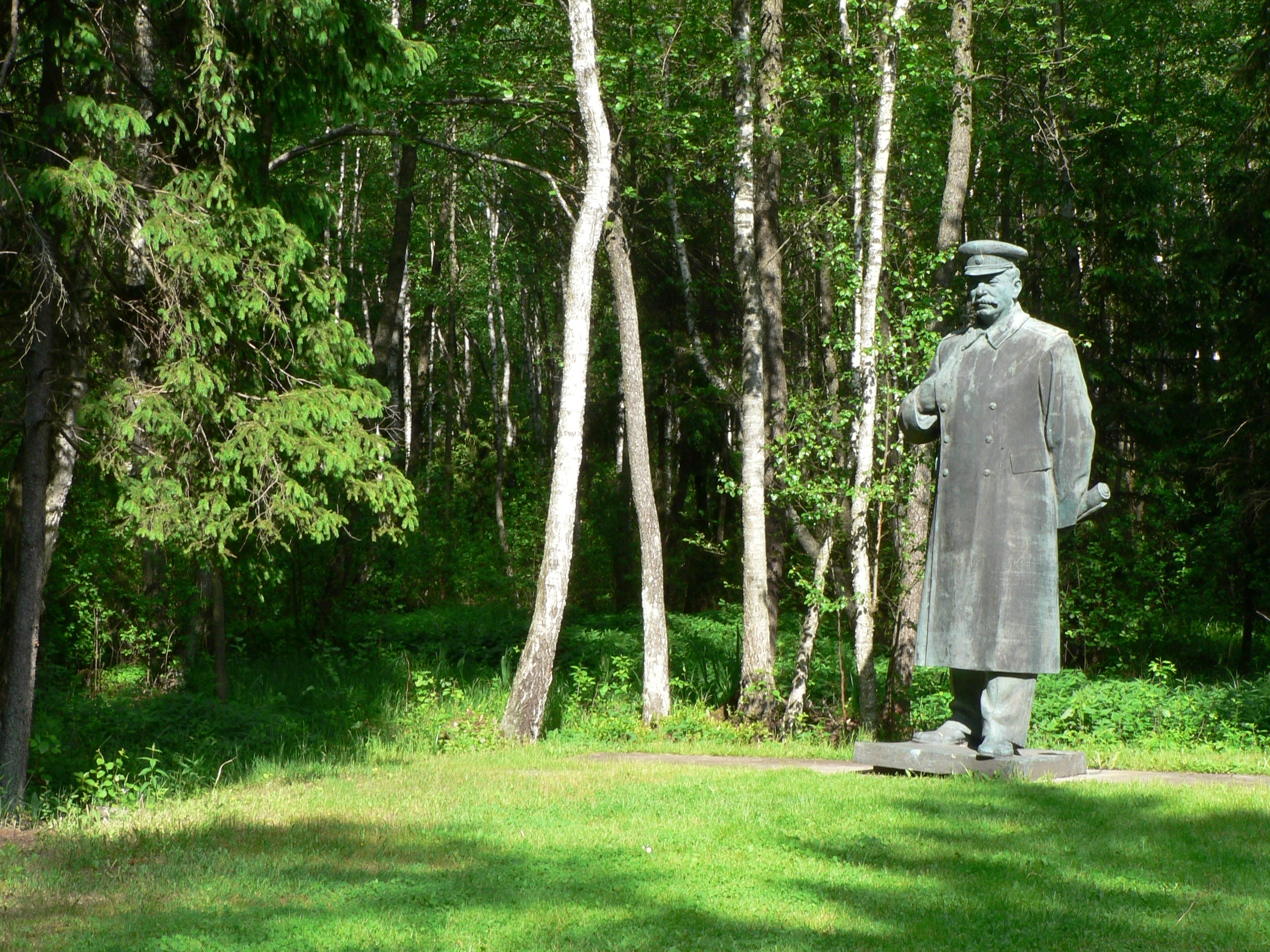
A statue of Joseph Stalin in Grūtas Park. During the Soviet occupation, it originally stood in Vilnius.

Grūtas Park (Lithuanian: Grūto parkas; also unofficially known as Stalin's World) is a socialist realism museum with a sculpture garden of Soviet-era statues and other Soviet ideological relics from the times of the Soviet occupation. Founded in 2001 by a local businessman Viliumas Malinauskas, the park is located near Druskininkai, about 130 kilometres (81 mi) southwest of Vilnius, Lithuania. The park requires an entrance fee.

== History ==
After Lithuania restored its independence in 1990, the vast majority of the Soviet statues were taken down and dumped in different places. Malinauskas asked Lithuanian authorities to grant him possession of the sculptures, so that he could build a privately financed museum. This Soviet-theme park was created in the wetlands of the Dzūkija National Park. Many of its features are re-creations of Soviet Gulag prison camps: wooden paths, guard towers, and barbed-wire fences.

Its establishment was controversial and faced considerable opposition at the time. Some ideas originally meant to be a part of the park were never allowed. Examples include transporting the visitors in a Gulag-style train. Grūtas Park and its founder Malinauskas won the 2001 Ig Nobel Peace Prize. Since January 2007, the park has been in dispute with the Lithuanian copyright protection agency. The agency requires royalties to be paid to seven Lithuanian artists who created some of the statues.

The park also contains playgrounds, a mini-zoo and cafes, all containing relics of the Soviet era. On special occasions, actors stage re-enactments of various Soviet-sponsored festivals.

== Exposition ==
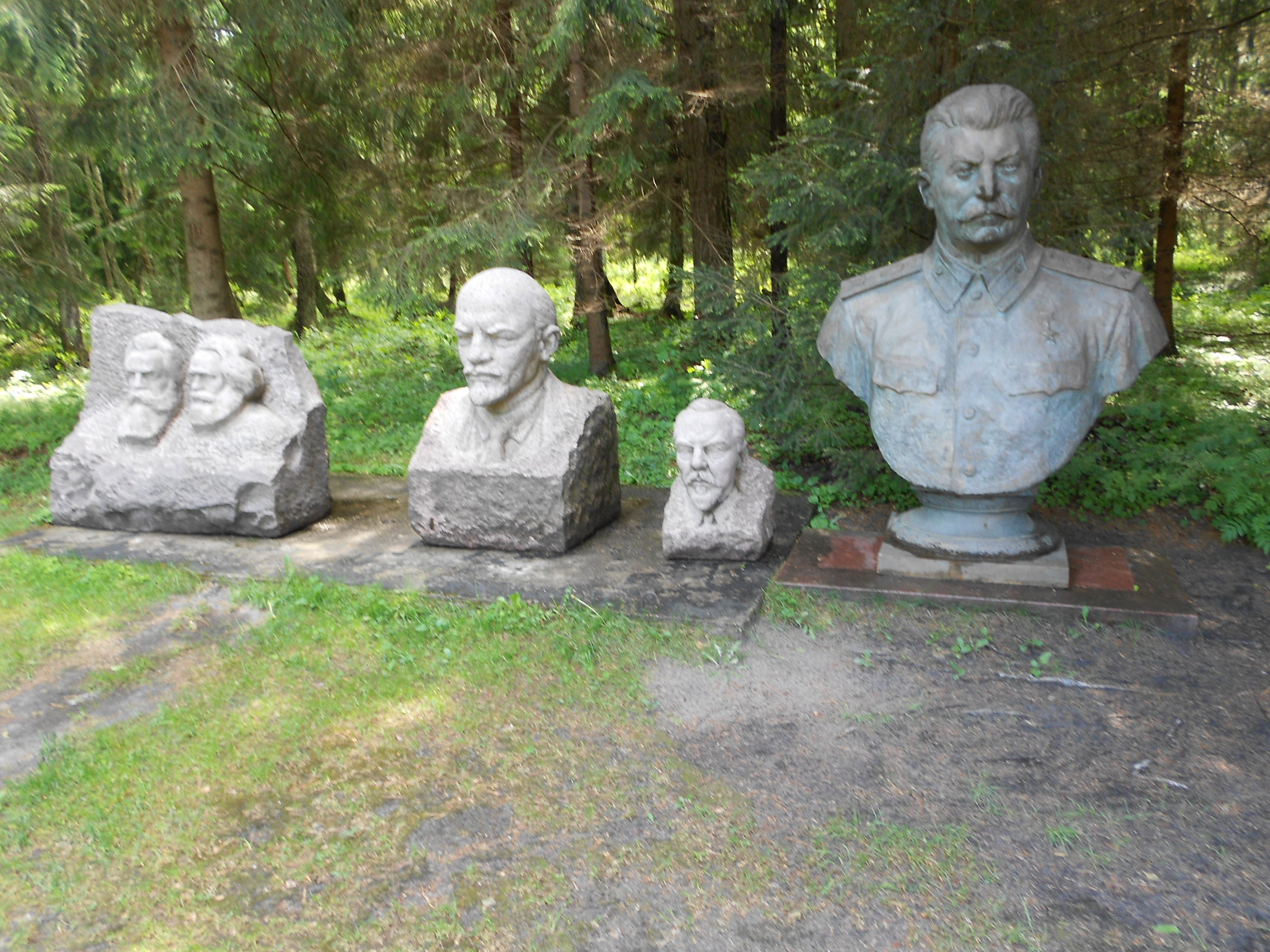
Communist busts

The exposition, consisting of 86 statues by 46 different sculptors, is organized into spheres. Each of the statues features a Soviet or socialist activist, many of them ethnic Lithuanians. The Totalitarian Sphere features sculptures of the main Communist leaders and thinkers, including Vladimir Lenin, Joseph Stalin, and Karl Marx. The Terror Sphere is dedicated to sculptures of founders of the Communist Party of Lithuania (Zigmas Aleksa-Angarietis, Vincas Mickevičius-Kapsukas) and officers of the Red Army (Feliksas Baltušis-Žemaitis, Ieronim Uborevich). It also has a sculpture of Felix Dzerzhinsky, the organizer of the Red Terror.

The Soviet Sphere includes sculptures of the four leaders of Lithuanian Communists, executed in the aftermath of the 1926 Lithuanian coup d'état, and activists of the Lithuanian–Soviet War of 1918–1919. The Red Sphere is dedicated to Soviet partisans, including Marytė Melnikaitė. The Occupation and Death Spheres showcases the brutal side the Soviet regime, including mass deportations and suppression of the Lithuanian partisans. The 20 hectares of the park area is reminiscent of severe Siberian conditions with its guard towers, fragments of concentration camps and other elements of Soviet repression.

According to The Economist, "As countries grapple with their unsavoury pasts and consider the rightful place of their controversial monuments, the park offers an alternative model to museums or destruction."

== See also ==
- Museum of Occupations and Freedom Fights – also known as the "KGB museum" in Vilnius
- Memento Park – similar statue park in Budapest, Hungary
