= Gaideliai =

- Village
- Location within Lithuania
- Coordinates: 55.653°N 25.886°E
- Country: Lithuania
- County: Utena County

Population
  - Total: 18
- Time zone: Eastern European Time (UTC+2)
  - Summer (DST): Eastern European Summer Time (UTC+3)

Gaideliai is a village in Zarasai District Municipality, Utena County, Lithuania. The population was 18 in 2011. It is 2 km from Antalieptė.
