= Vasaknai Manor =

Manor in Lithuania

Coordinates: 55°41′9″N 25°47′29″E

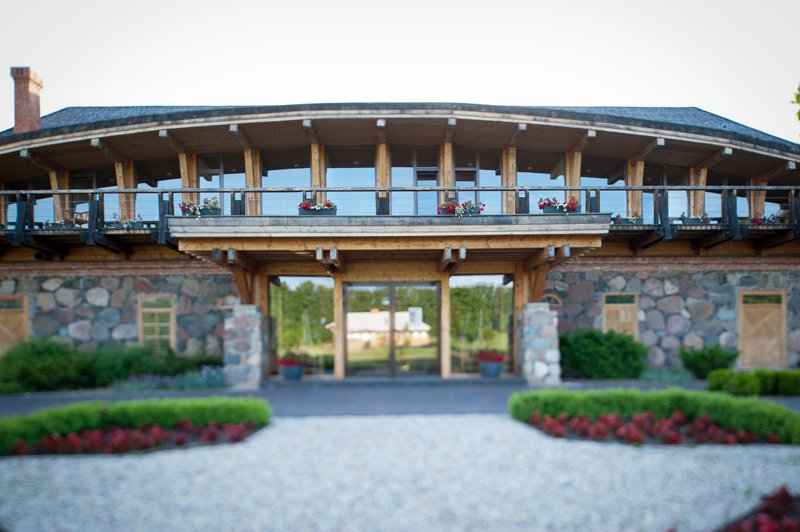

Vasaknai Manor is a former residential manor. It is located 6 kilometres (4 mi) from Antalieptė and 7 kilometres (4 mi) from Dusetos, in the East coast of Vasaknai Lake.

In 1505 the manor was bought by the Radvilos family, at that time one of the richest in Europe. Later, it was bought by the Pliateriai family. The family became actively involved in the uprising of 1831 (Lithuania had then been annexed by Russia). This resulted in the confiscation of all their property, including the manor, by the czarist government.

The manor was falling into decay until Count Jonas Mykolas Tiskevicius acquired it. The Tiskeviciai family were Lithuania's largest landowners in the 19th century. They owned the Manor until the beginning of the First World War. After Lithuania was occupied and integrated into the Soviet Union, the manor rotted away to its foundation.

In 2003, the manor was acquired by its current owners, who, with financial support from the European Union Structural Funds, have brought it back to life. Today the manor property consists of a barn (the building that has been rebuilt), servant house (a brewery today with additional rooms), stabling, the ruins of the original manor and a park, which has been declared a national heritage site.

Today, the Manor of Vasaknos is a recreational site for weddings, anniversaries, conferences, and other events. The property consists of a hotel that sleeps up to 65 persons, a restaurant and a conference hall that sits up to 120 people, a cigar and poker room, a pool table, and an outdoor terrace. There is also a lakeside sauna and a brewery where Vasaknu beer is produced.
