= Zabičiūnai =

- Village
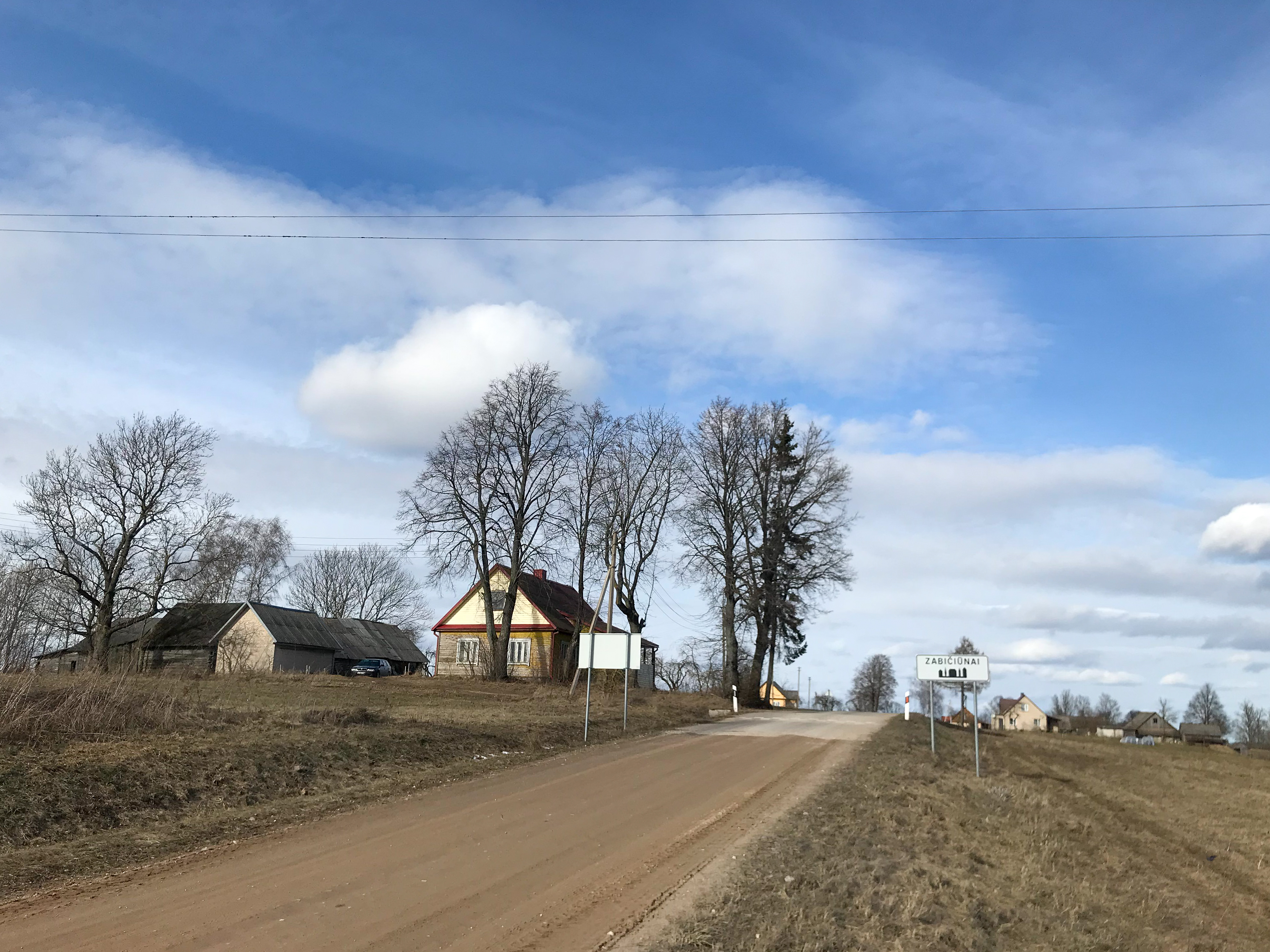

- Location of Zabičiūnai
- Coordinates: 55°39′N 25°47′E
- Country: Lithuania
- Ethnographic region: Aukštaitija
- County: Utena County
- Municipality: Zarasai District Municipality
- Eldership: Antalieptė Eldership

Population (2021)
  - Total: 37
- Time zone: UTC+2 (EET)
  - Summer (DST): UTC+3 (EEST)
- Postal code: 32241 Lithuania

Zabičiūnai is a village in the Zarasai District Municipality, Lithuania. It is located 4 kilometres (2.5 mi) southwest of Antalieptė. According to the 2021 Lithuanian census, 37 people lived in Zabičiūnai. In the centre of the village there is a cemetery covered with maples, yews and olive bushes. A few gravestones have survived, with the oldest one having 1884 engraved on it. The last burial happened in July 1944, the name of the person was Kostas Morozov and he died by shrapnel from an exploding shell.

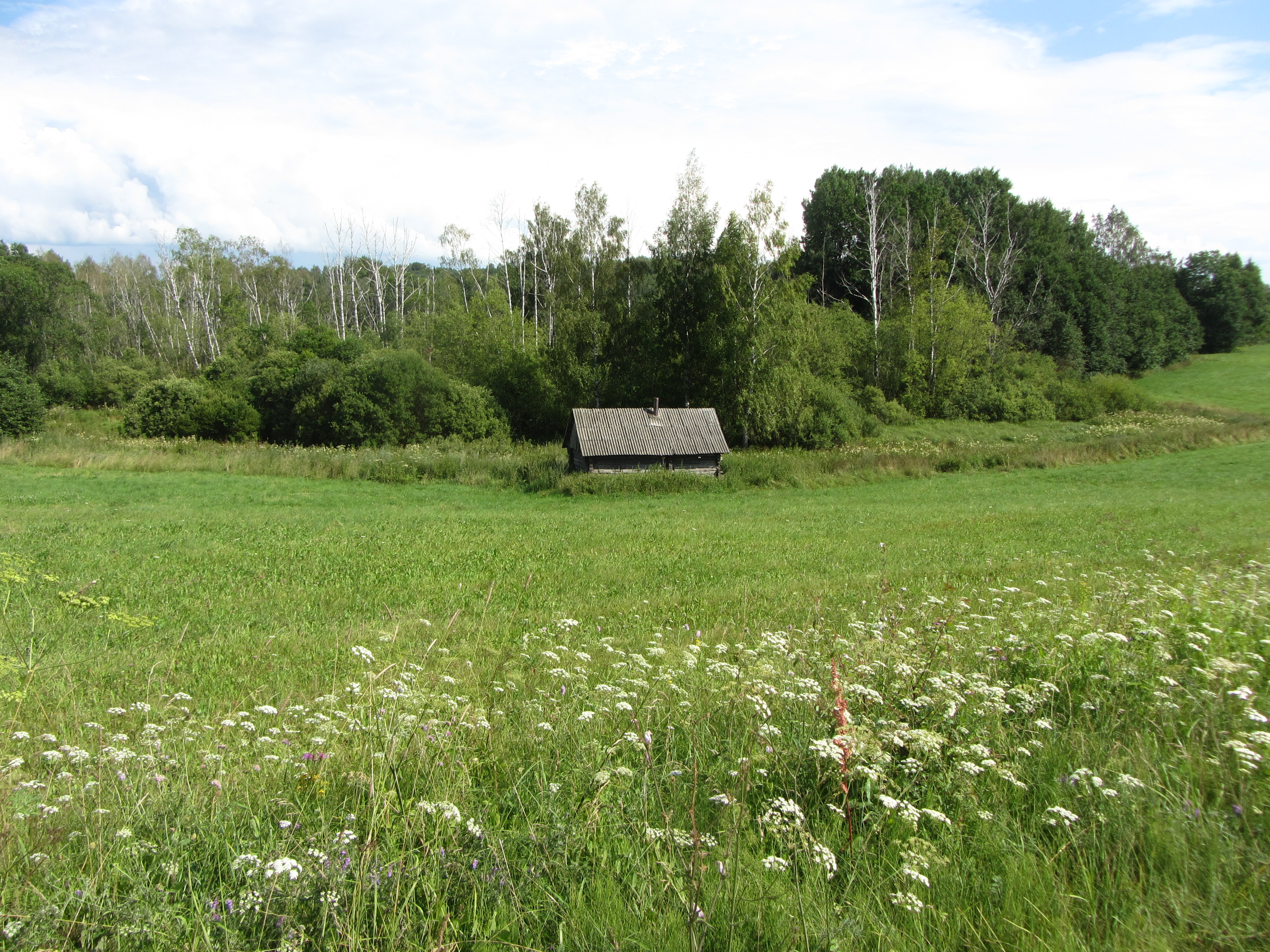
A sauna in the southern end of Zabičiūnai

== Population ==
1879	1902	1923	1959	1970	1979	1987	1989	2001	2011	2021
324	340	340	167	161	138	125	96	82	53	37
