= Imbradas Eldership =

Eldership of Lithuania

The Imbradas Eldership (Lithuanian: Imbrado seniūnija) is an eldership of Lithuania, located in the Zarasai District Municipality. In 2021 its population was 794.
