= Dusetai Manor =

Coordinates: 55°44′55″N 25°49′30″E

Dusetai Manor was a former residential manor in Didžiadvaris village, Zarasai District Municipality, Lithuania.
