= Antalieptė Eldership =

The Antalieptė Eldership (Lithuanian: Antalieptės seniūnija) is an eldership of Lithuania, located in the Zarasai District Municipality. In 2021 its population was 537.
