= Degučiai Eldership (Zarasai) =

Eldership of Lithuania

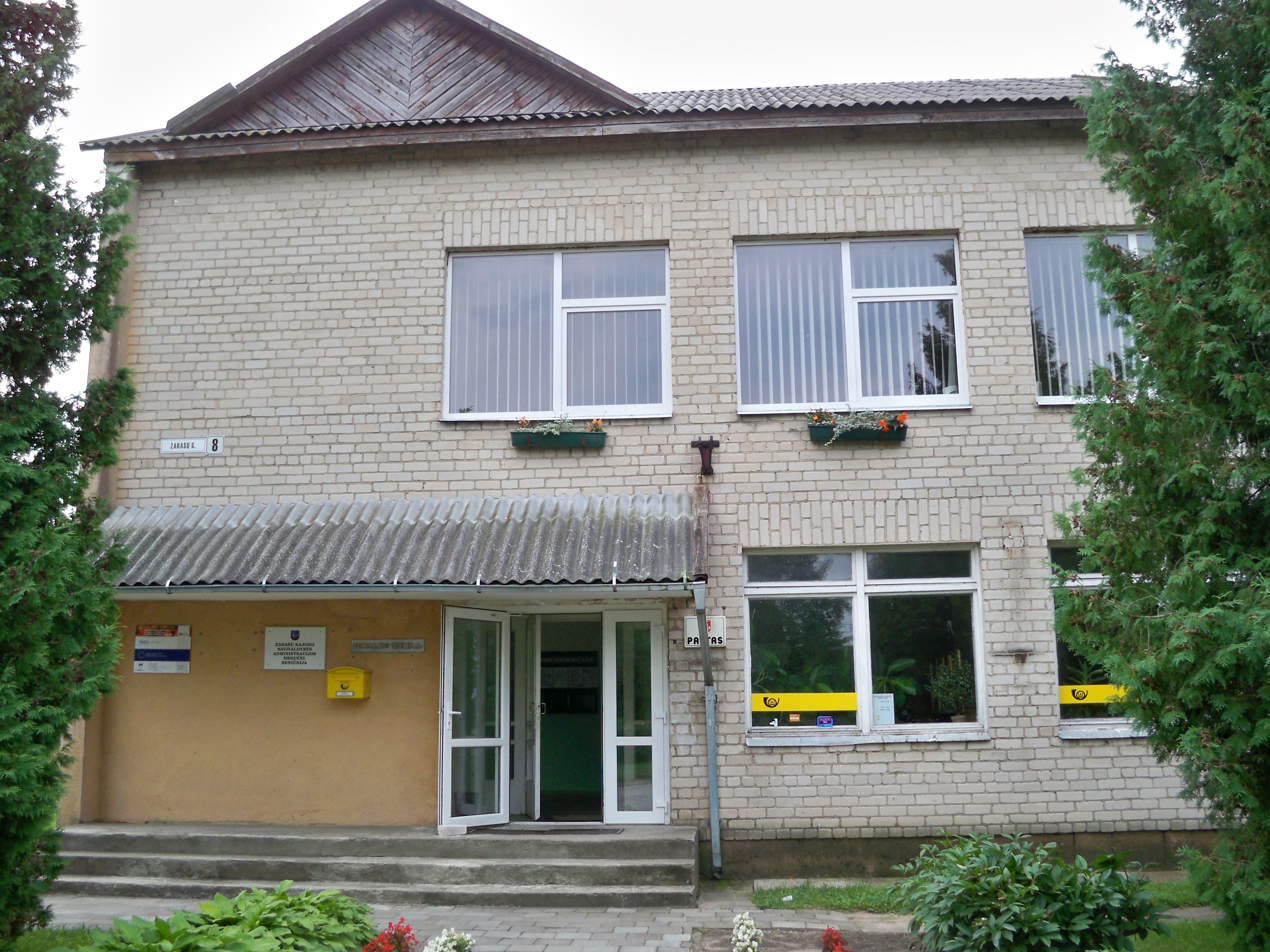

The Degučiai Eldership (Lithuanian: Degučių seniūnija) is an eldership of Lithuania, located in the Zarasai District Municipality. In 2021 its population was 677.
