= Antazavė Eldership =

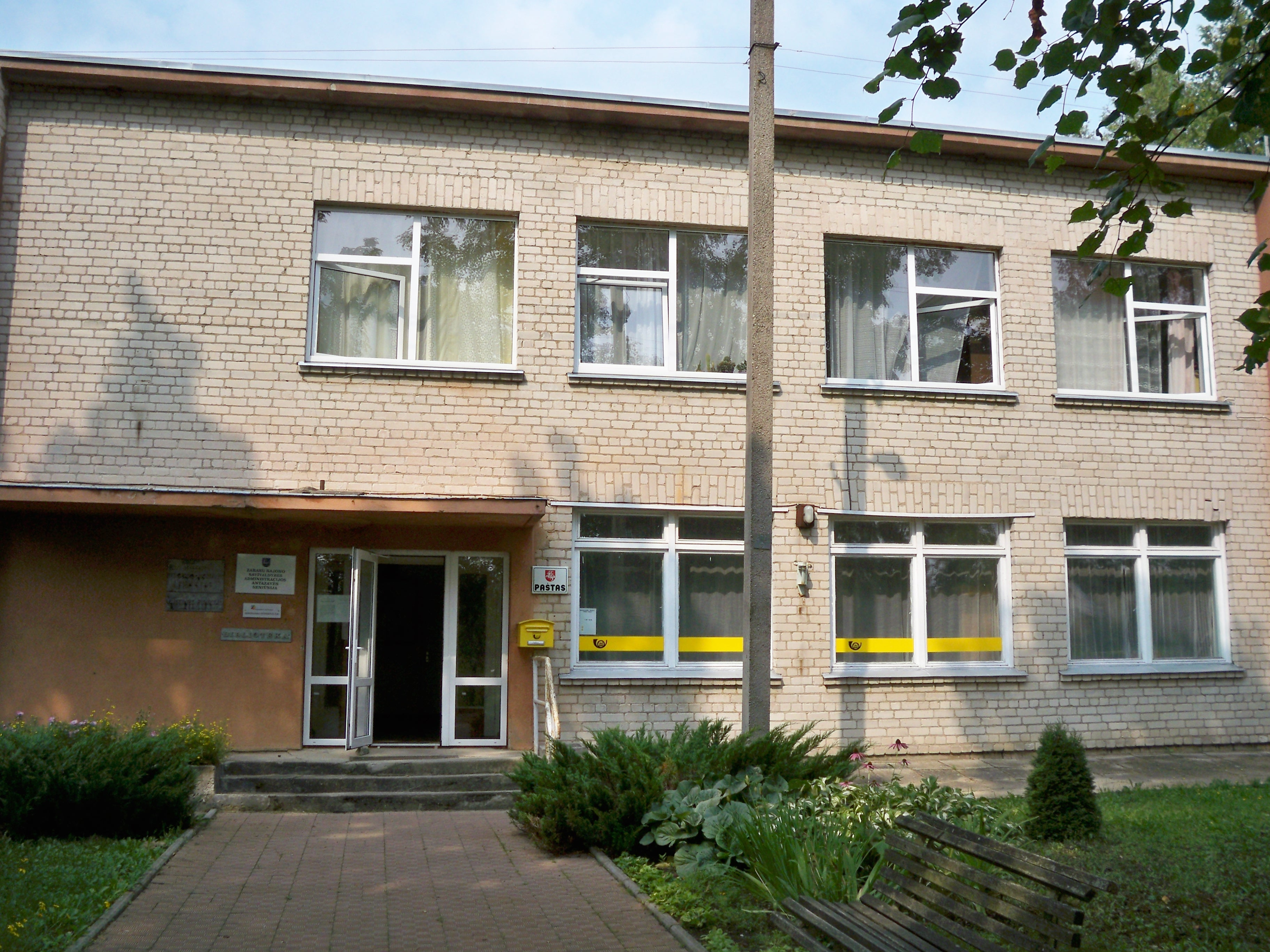
Antazavė eldership headquarters

The Antazavė Eldership (Lithuanian: Antazavės seniūnija) is an eldership of Lithuania, located in the Zarasai District Municipality. In 2021 its population was 778.
