= Dusetos Eldership =

Eldership of Lithuania

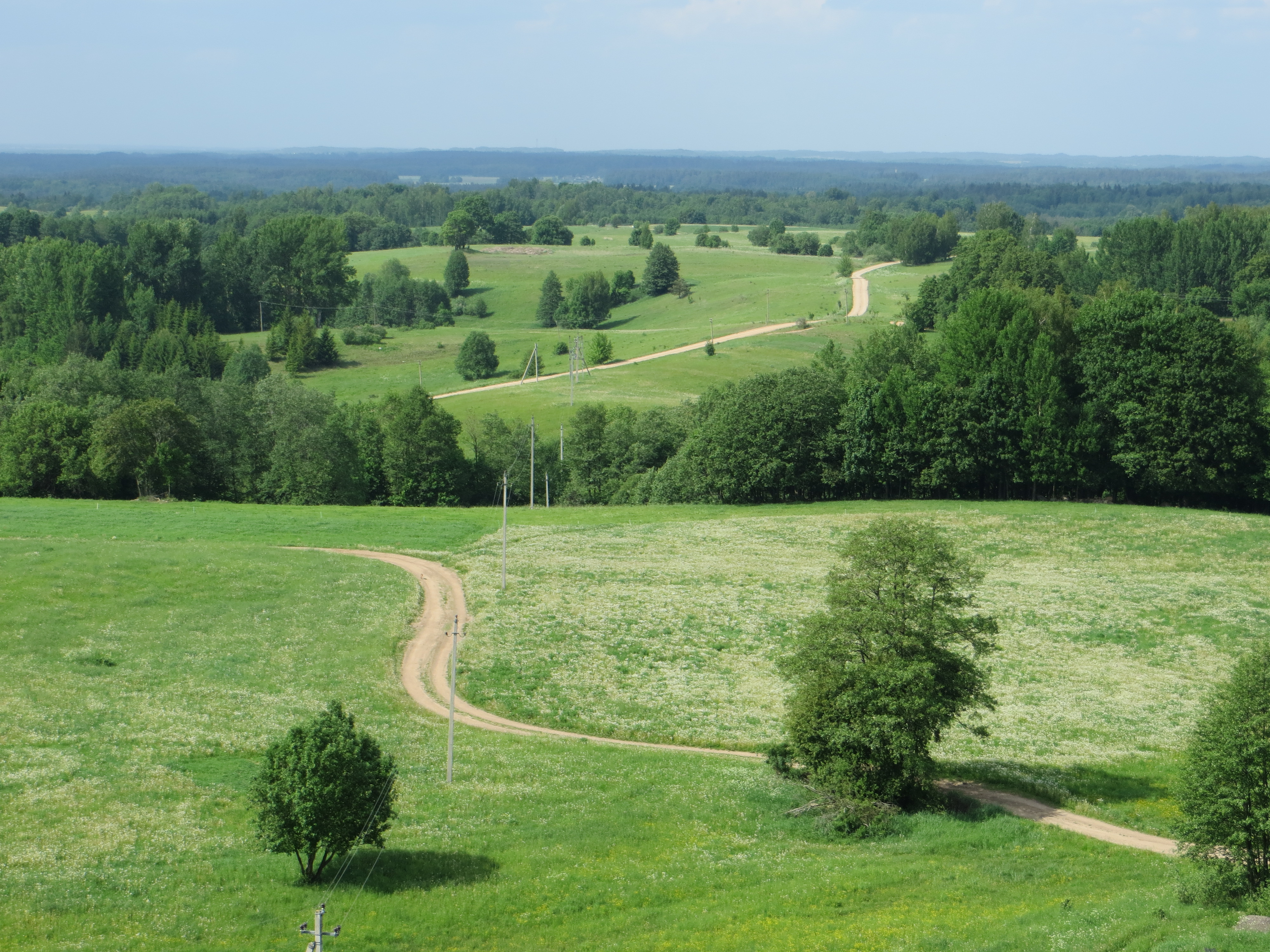
Dusetos Eldership

The Dusetos Eldership (Lithuanian: Dusetos seniūnija) is an eldership of Lithuania, located in the Zarasai District Municipality. In 2021 its population was 2091.
