= Dusetos =

- City
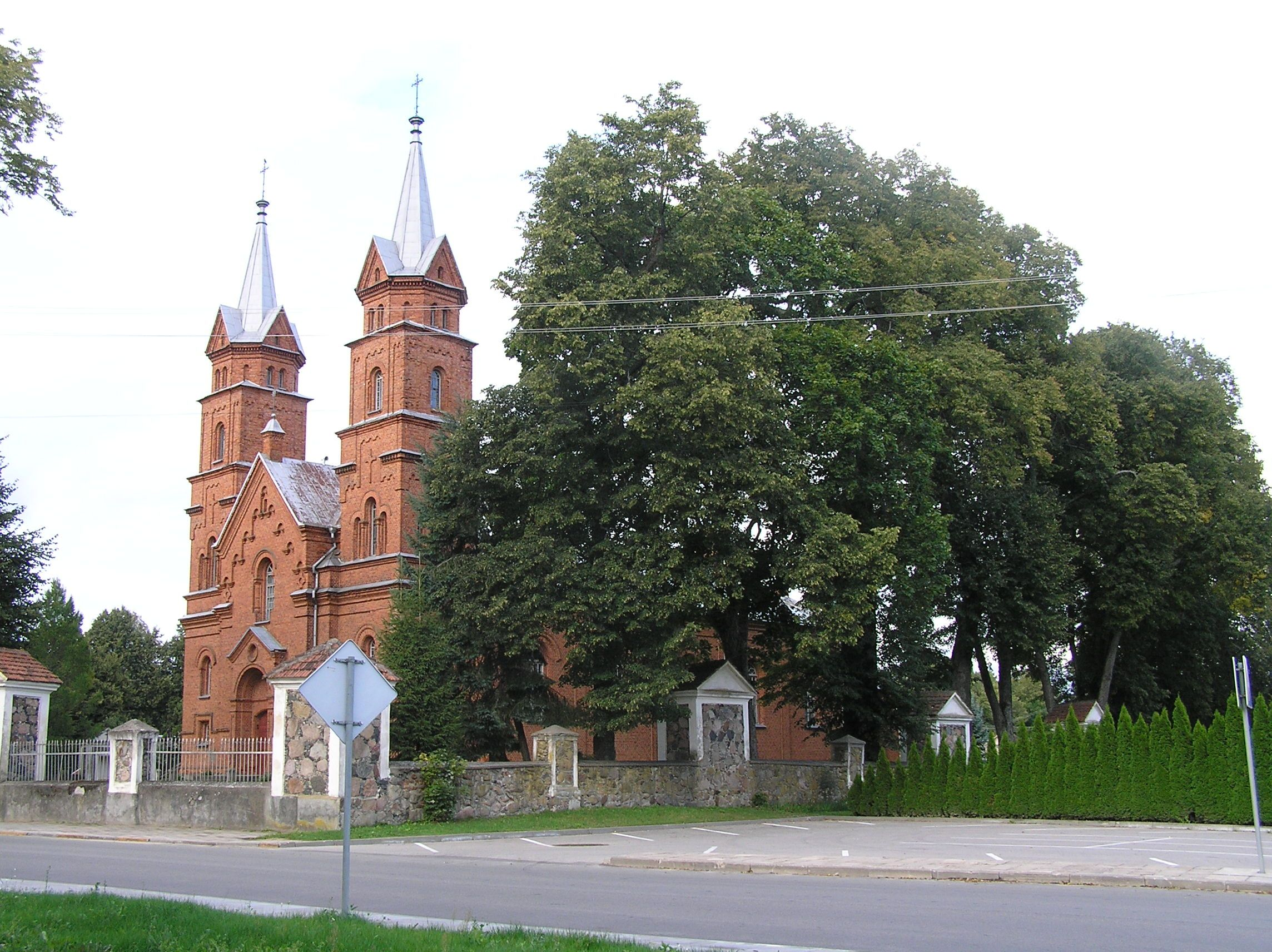
- Church of Dusetos

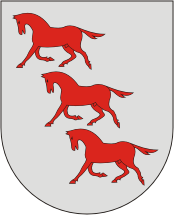
- Coat of arms

- Location of Dusetos
- Coordinates: 55°45′0″N 25°51′0″E
- Country: Lithuania
- Ethnographic region: Aukštaitija
- County: Utena County
- Municipality: Zarasai district municipality
- Eldership: Dusetos eldership
- Capital of: Dusetos eldership
- First mentioned: 1520
- Granted city rights: 1950

Population (2022)
  - Total: 517
- Time zone: UTC+2 (EET)
  - Summer (DST): UTC+3 (EEST)

Dusetos is a city in Zarasai district municipality, northeastern Lithuania, 30 km (19 mi) west of Zarasai, near Lake Sartai.

== History ==
On the night of April 16, 1905, a fire broke out and continued into the early hours of April 17. On April 18, Christians who believed the fire was caused by Jewish arsonists carried out a pogrom.

According to the 1923 census, 704 Jews were living in the town. As a result of out-migration in the 1920s and 1930s, the number of Jews in the town decreased to around 500 by 1939. On August 26, 1941, Jews of Dusetos, together with the Jews of Zarasai were murdered in a mass execution perpetrated by forces of Einsatzkommando 3, assisted by the Lithuanian police. A monument stands today at the site of the shootings.

A Yizkor book about Jewish life in Desetos (Yiddish: Dusyat) was published in 1989 in Tel Aviv, Israell in Hebrew. The book is available for purchase and for free online. It has been translated to English and is available online on JewishGen

== Notable people ==
List of notable people who were born or have lived in Dusetos

- Faustas Latėnas - composer, theatre manager, politician, and diplomat
- Šarūnas Sauka - postmodern painter
- Liucija Vaitukaitytė - professional footballer
