= Šarūnas Sauka =

Lithuanian painter

- Born: Šarūnas Sauka; 11 September 1958 (age 67); Vilnius, Lithuania
- Education: Lithuanian National Institute of Art
- Known for: Painting
- Movement: Postmodernism
- Awards: Lithuanian National Prize, 1989

Stairs (1989) by Šarūnas Sauka

Inferno (1991-1992) by Šarūnas Sauka

Šarūnas Sauka (born 11 September 1958 in Vilnius, Lithuania) is a postmodern painter. His father is an eminent Lithuanian philologist Donatas Sauka. In 1989, he was awarded the Lithuanian National Prize.

== Life & work ==
Šarūnas Sauka was born in 1958, in the Lithuanian capital of Vilnius. From 1976 to 1983, he studied at the National Institute of Lithuania, Vilnius Art Academy. In 1989, the artist was nominated for the Lithuanian National Prize for the diptych "Žalgirio mūšis" (English: Battle of Grunwald). His monumental painting "A Thousand Years for Lithuania" (2008-2012) is displayed in the Lithuanian Presidential Palace. Sauka now lives in Dusetos, a small and remote city nestled among numerous lakes and forests.

He has two children, Monika Saukaitė, a painter, and Mykolas Sauka, a sculptor and writer.

Šarūnas' work, by both critics and laymen, is often referred to as "different". However, the "difference" in Sauka's paintings is quite consistent. Sauka's imagery is rich with religious symbolism, sharp contrasts of colour, characters and objects in a state of decay. The images of blood, organs, severed body parts and butchery are often found in his paintings. This literal dissection or deformation of the human form is possibly an expression of the author's belief that the human must be stripped from conventional chains in order to contemplate the true condition of its body and soul. In many of his paintings, he uses his own face, sometimes faces of his family members or relatives; the victim and aggressor usually both have the same face. A full appreciation of his artwork requires an understanding of the extent and cruelty of the communist terror in Lithuania and other countries of Eastern Europe and a grasp of some of the underlying metaphysical and archetypal ideas that are basic to his world view and sensibility.

"The scope of Sauka's imagination includes various manifestations of corruption, rotting, and deterioration, usually connected with human corporeality understood as the antithesis to the Christian ideal of redemption and that of corporeal resurrection. Here we meet horror—struck Gnoticism [sic?] mixed with Postmodern irony. The artist's world is not a theophany, but a place of Gnostic terror, abandonment and submission to malign forces. However, the labyrinth of material darkness is also a vessel where alchemical work can be done, while supported by the creative imagination. Hence, pathology is inherently mythologized, just as all mythology is pathologized. Sauka stands against both the dematerialization and the spiritualization of reality. He partly follows the tradition of classical European painting, especially as regards various techniques and principles of expression, though creating quite a different context where any traces of Aristotelian logic vanish and the forces of evil become permanent and irrefutable. In a sense, Sauka not only symbolizes the gloomy end of Christian civilization and its methphysics [sic?], but also reveals the foolish face of the 20th century, which appears when the masks of rationality and seeming wisdom are stripped away." (Algis Uždavinys, Dr. of Philosophy)

== Personality ==
Šarūnas is known for his somewhat isolated lifestyle (living and working in the remote village of Dusetos), reluctance to speak about his work or give interviews. He is extremely diligent, evident from his portfolio of hundreds of paintings.

== See also ==
- List of Lithuanian artists
