= Zarasai =

- City
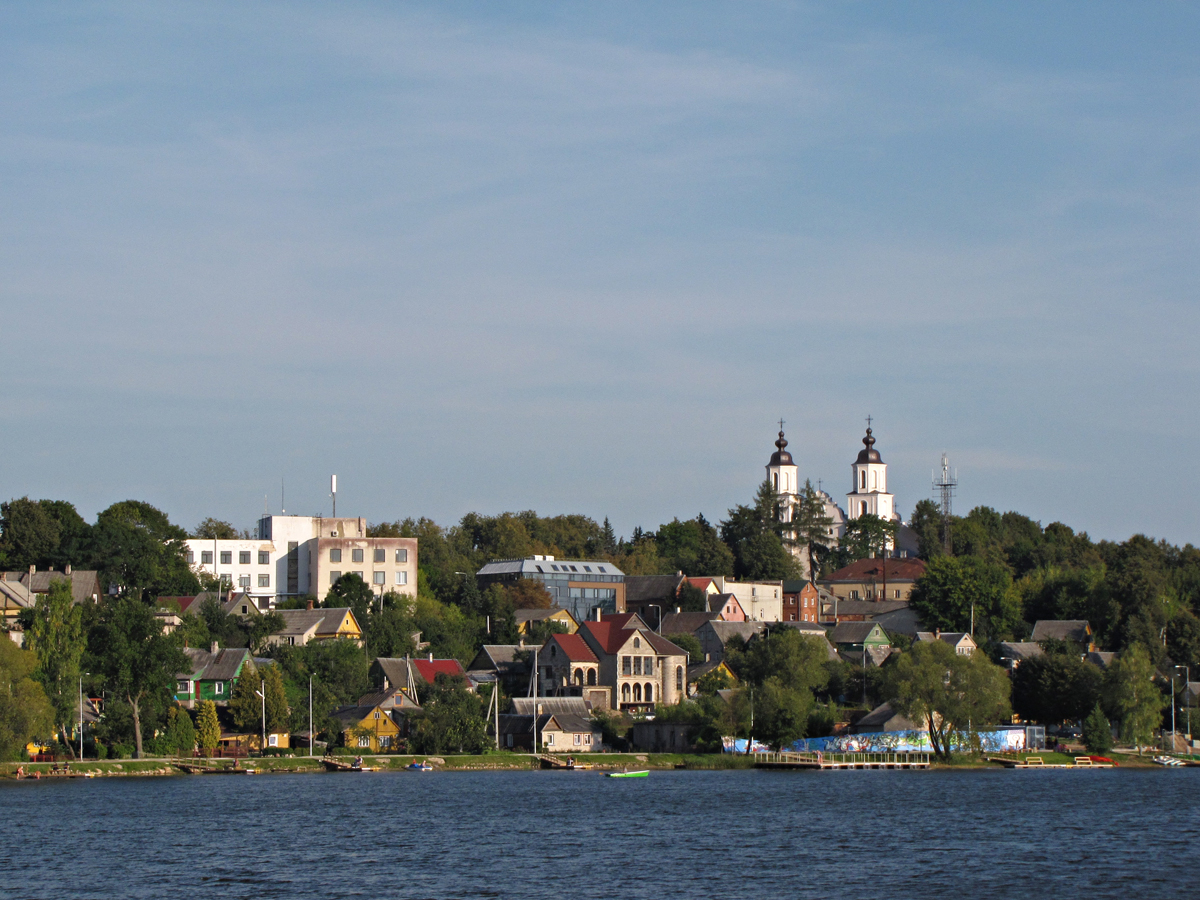

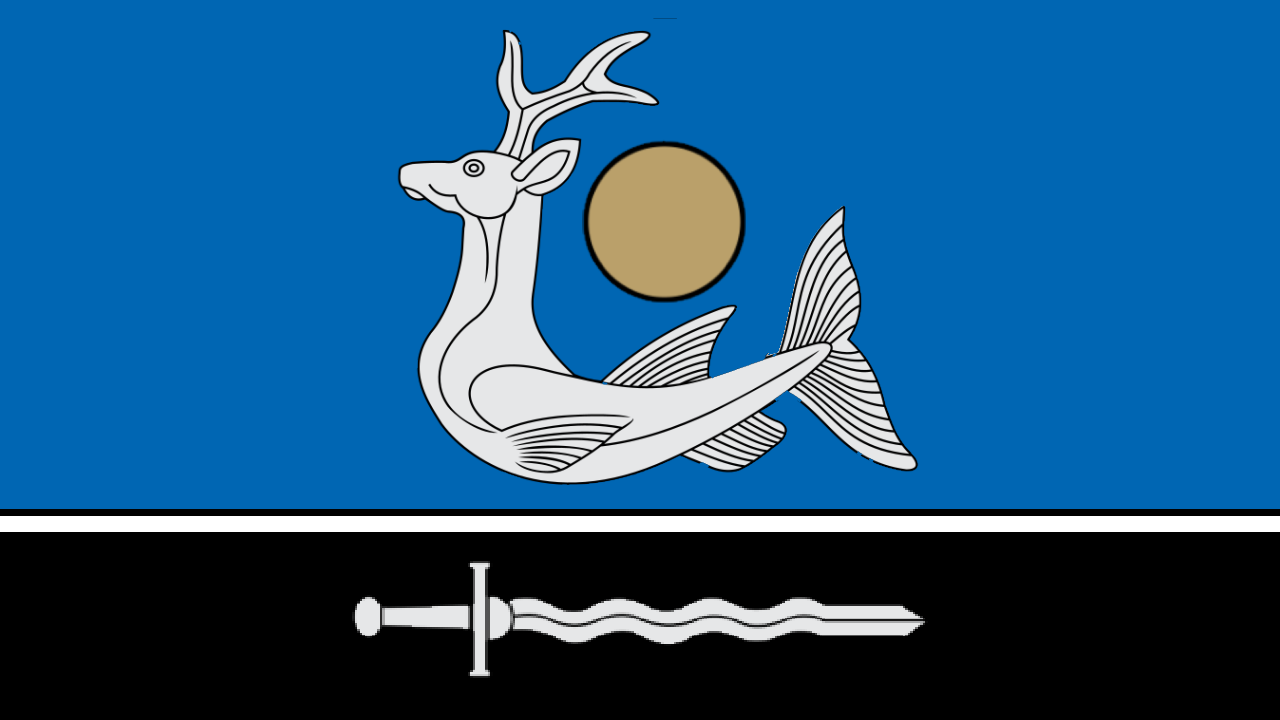
- Flag Coat of arms

- Location of Zarasai
- Coordinates: 55°44′0″N 26°15′0″E
- Country: Lithuania
- Ethnographic region: Aukštaitija
- County: Utena County
- Municipality: Zarasai District Municipality
- Eldership: Zarasai city eldership
- Capital of: Zarasai District Municipality; Zarasai city eldership Zarasai rural eldership
- First mentioned: 1506
- Granted city rights: 1843

Population (2022)
  - Total: 5,947
- Time zone: UTC+2 (EET)
  - Summer (DST): UTC+3 (EEST)
- Website: http://www.zarasai.lt

Zarasai is a city in northeastern Lithuania, surrounded by many lakes and rivers: to the southwest of the city is Lake Zarasas, to the north – Lake Zarasaitis, to the southeast – Lake Baltas, and the east – Lake Griežtas. Lakes Zarasaitis and Griežtas are connected by the River Laukesa. Zarasai holds the record for the highest recorded daytime temperature in Lithuania at 37.5 °C (99.5 °F) on 30 July 1994. A few music festivals are held in Zarasai in summer, such as Mėnuo Juodaragis and Roko naktys.

== Etymology ==
The name of Zarasai is of Selonian origin. Lithuanian linguist Kazimieras Būga explained its origins – in Selonian language the word lake was pronounced as ezeras or ezaras, plural form ezerasai. During the time it was shortened to Zarasai. In Polish, the town was known since the first third of the 16th century as Jeziorosy, from jezioro meaning 'lake'. In 1836, the town was renamed Novoalexandrovsk in honor of Tsar Nicholas I's son Alexander. This name was maintained until 1918. From 1919 to 1929, in the newly independent Lithuania, the town was called Ežerėnai, from ežeras, the Lithuanian word for lake. The Yiddish name Ezherene is derived from Ežerėnai. The current Lithuanian name Zarasai was adopted only in 1929.

== History ==
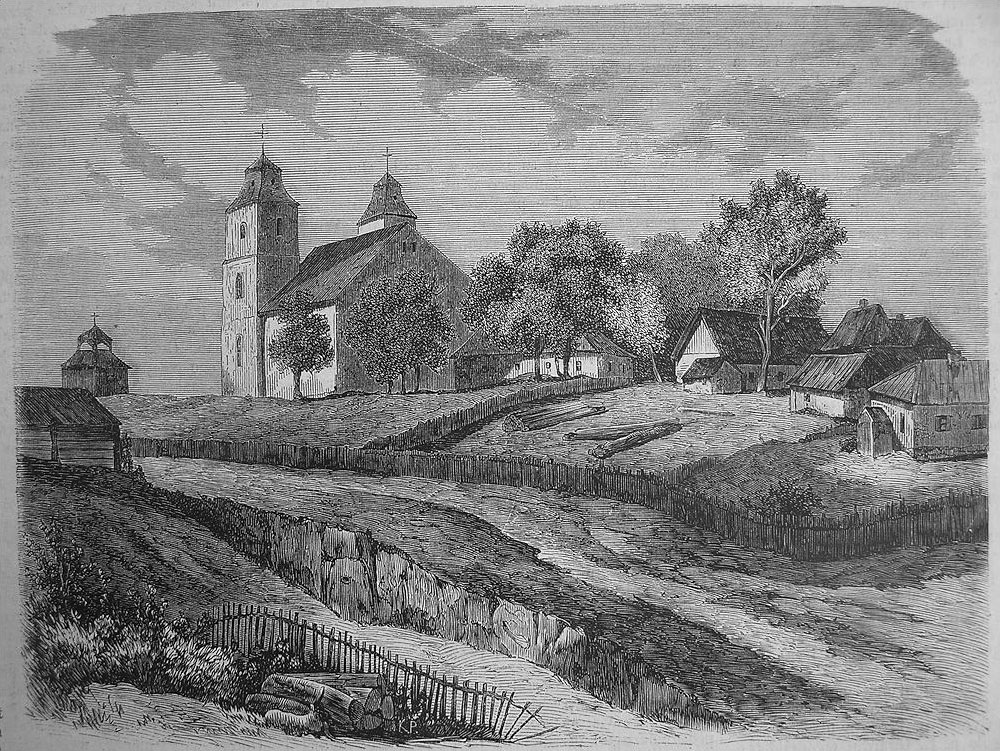
Zarasai in 1864

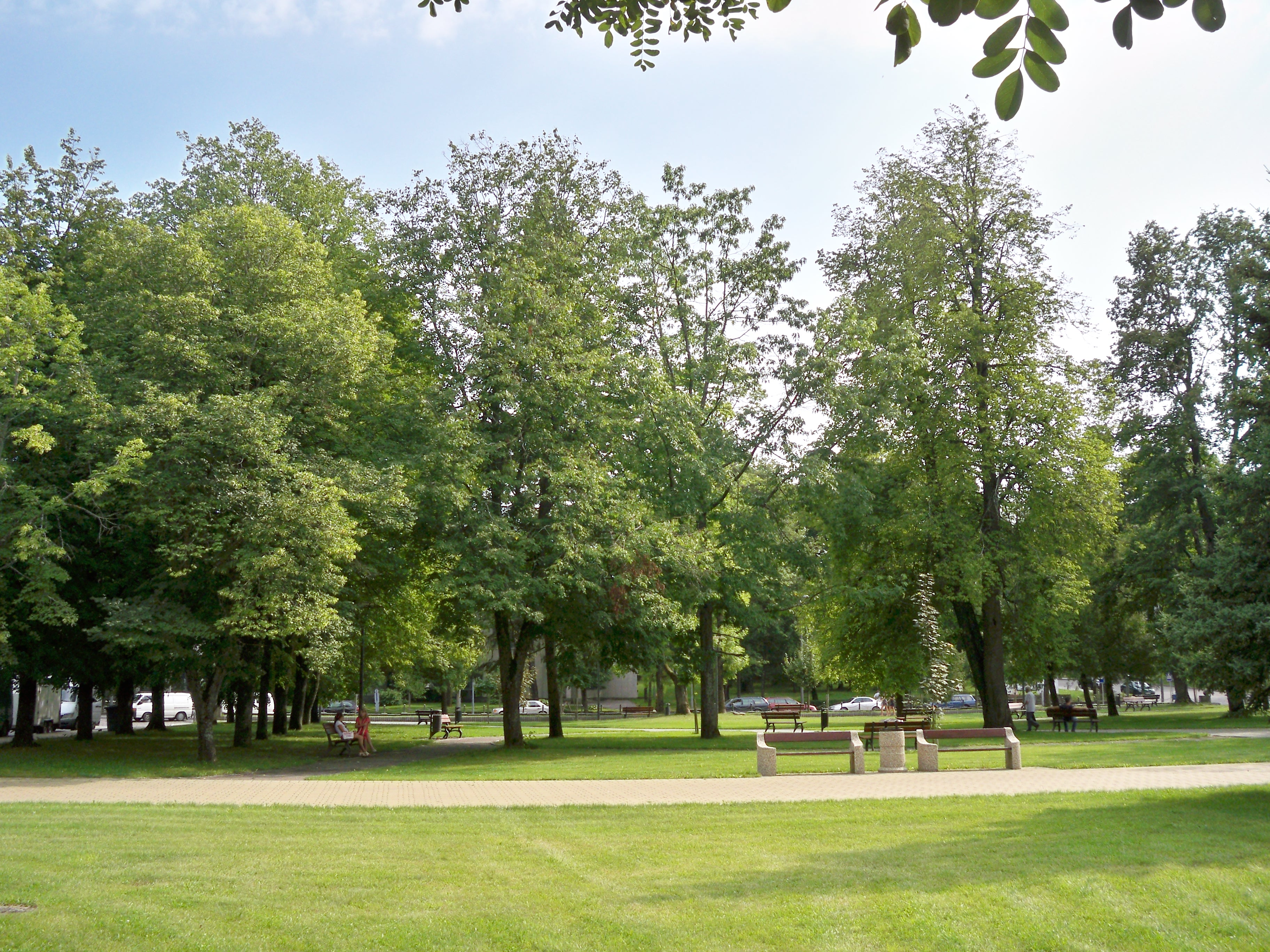
Zarasai Park

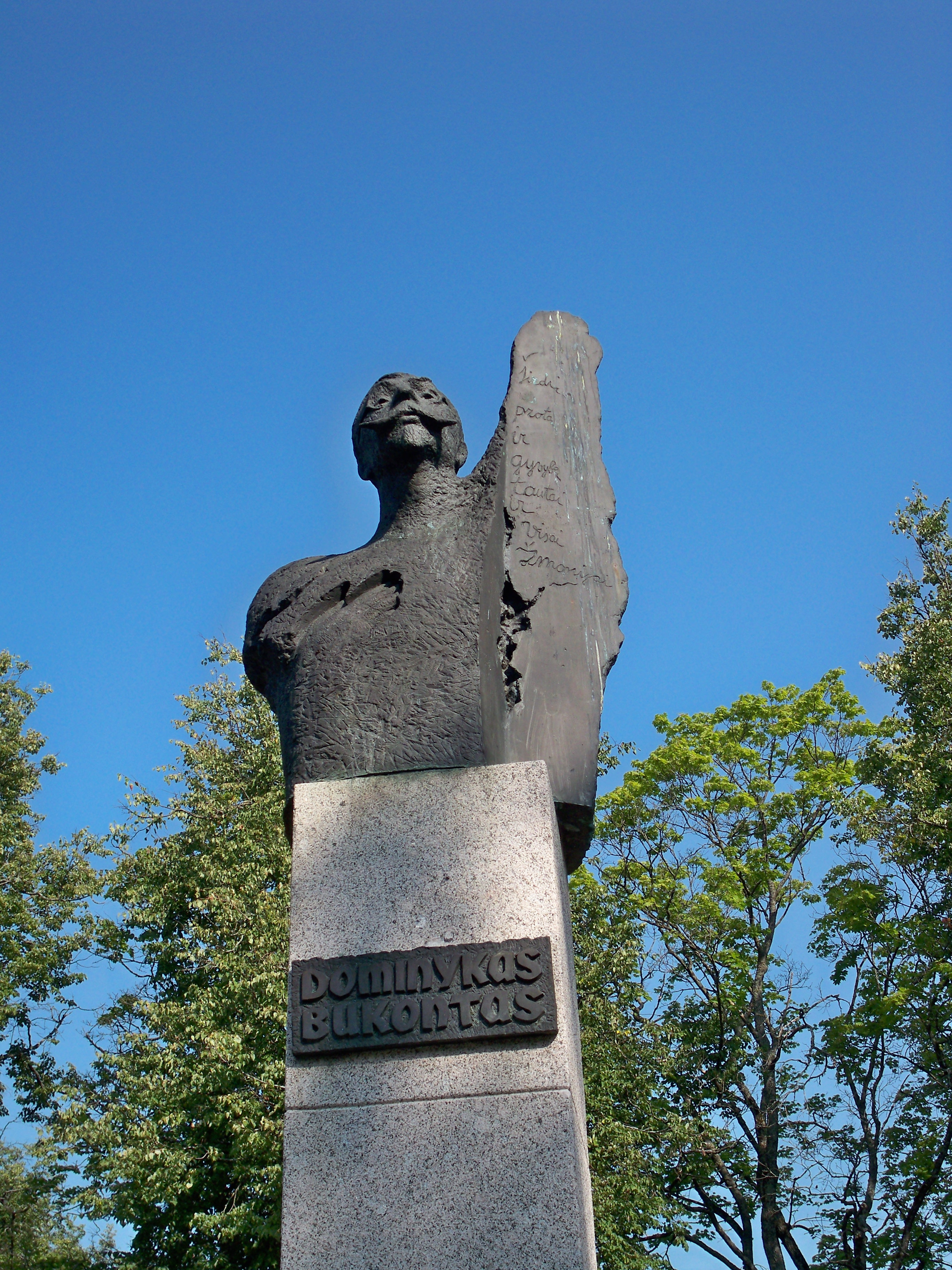
Dominykas Bukontas Monument

The lands were inhabited by the Baltic tribe Selonians. The exact date of the city's foundation is unknown, but a date around the turn of the 15th/16th centuries is generally accepted and 1506 is the official date of foundation. At that time, a manor stood in the present town's territory, together with a monastery and church on Didžioji Island in Lake Zarasas. The settlement was located on one of the largest ancient trade-routes from Riga to Pskov.

The settlement formed part of one of the domains of the diocese of Vilnius from the 14th century to the 18th century. Zarasai manor was mentioned in written sources at the end of the 15th century and in 1522 Zarasai was recorded as a small town. In 1598, Zarasai was termed a volost. In 1613, Zarasai was marked on a map of the Grand Duchy of Lithuania, with the place-name written in Polish as Jeziorosa.

By 1669, the town had a population of over 300. There were craftsmen's workshops and an inn, a network of streets and main roads to the nearby towns. However, further development was obstructed due to wars, diseases and fires. The Great Northern War and the plague at the beginning of the 18th century caused great damage to the small town and its citizens. According to an inventory of 1721, there were only 100 people living in the town, and the craftsmen did not develop their activities.

The first Orthodox church of the Old Believers was built in Barauka, Zarasai, in 1735. Significant growth occurred during the second half of the 18th century, when a school and a customs agency were established; the agency issued permits to sell flax in Riga. In 1795 after the third partition of the Polish-Lithuanian Commonwealth, Zarasai and nearby territories were taken over by the Russian Empire. Zarasai manor and the town were given to Vilnius Guberniya. Zarasai was on the road between St. Petersburg and Warsaw, construction of which began during the first half of the 19th century. The section from Zarasai to Kaunas was built in 1830–1836, which increased the commercial importance of the town.

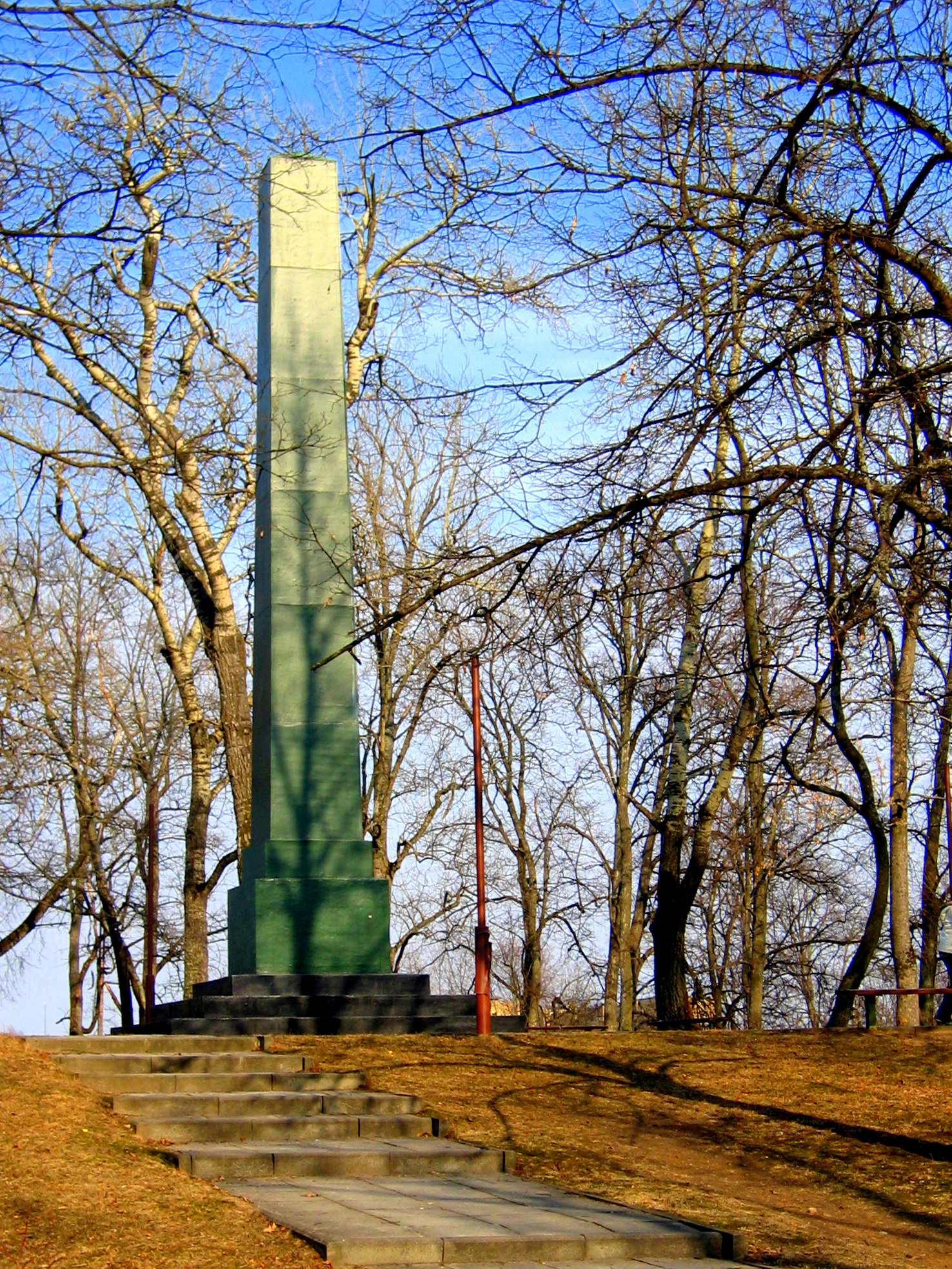
Monument to the completion of the Kaunas–Daugavpils road

Despite several confrontations between the Tsar's army and rebels near Zarasai, and a disastrous fire of 1834 that burned down practically the whole town centre, the population grew and the rebuilt town rapidly developed. In 1836, Tsar Nicholas I of Russia visited the town and was so impressed by the wonderful landscape that he decided to rename the town in the name of his son Alexander. As there were a few towns in the Empire named Aleksandrovsk, Zarasai was renamed Novo Aleksandrovsk and was so called from 1836 to 1918. At the same time, a coat of arms was granted and Zarasai County (Zarasai County covered an area of 7223 sq.m. in 1897), formed out of a part of Braslaw County, was attached to Kaunas Governorate.

In 1837, the centre of Zarasai was rebuilt to a new plan, with a central horseshoe-shaped square bounded by a road, from which a network of streets radiated. The intention was to prevent major fires – Zarasai is the only town in Lithuania which has such a plan, which has remained to this day without any major changes.

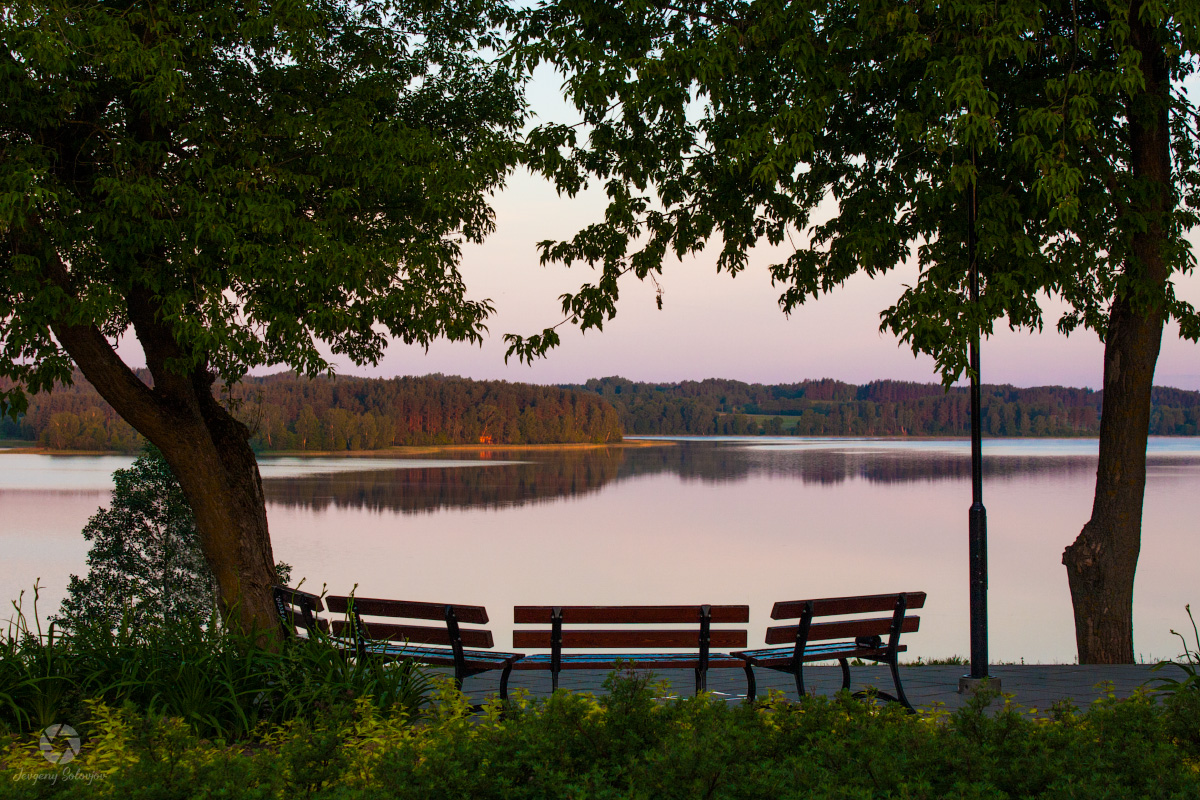
Zarasas Lake, Zarasai, Lithuania, 2017

During the course of 1919 the Socialist Soviet Republic of Lithuania and Belorussia (Litbel) gradually lost territory to advancing Polish forces. The Polish army seized the town on August 27, 1919, being the last town where that the Litbel Soviet republic lost. In 1919 a Lithuanian name, Ežerėnai, was given to the town. Since linguists discovered this name to be of Selonian origin, the name was changed in 1929 to Zarasai. In 1924, the designation of Zarasai county was finally approved and public offices of the independent Lithuania were developed in the town. During the period of independence, Zarasai was an important summer resort for holidaymakers who came from all over Lithuania.

During World War II, Zarasai was under German occupation from 25 June 1941 until 29 July 1944 and administered as part of the Generalbezirk Litauen of Reichskommissariat Ostland. On August 26, 1941, 2,569 Jews from the Zarasai area were murdered near the village of Degučiai by an Einsatzgruppe of Germans and Lithuanian collaborators.

In 2010, the Zarasai Region became one of the European Destinations of Excellence.

== Famous people ==
- Yehuda Pen
- Pyotr Nikolayevich Wrangel
- Al Jaffee
- Uļjana Semjonova (b. 1952), is a retired Soviet-Latvian basketball player and winner of two Olympic Gold medals
