= Antalieptė =

Town in Lithuania

- Town
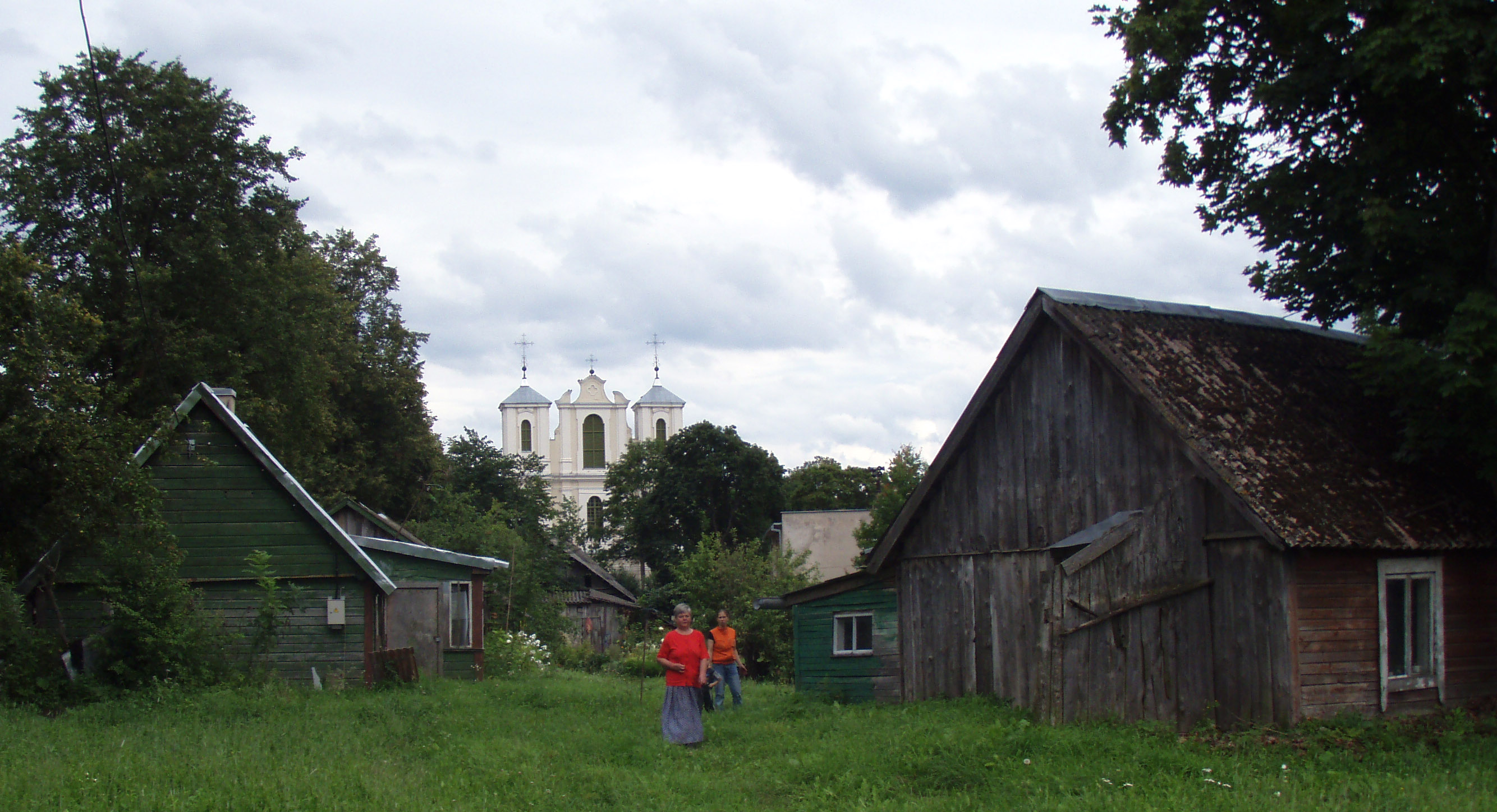

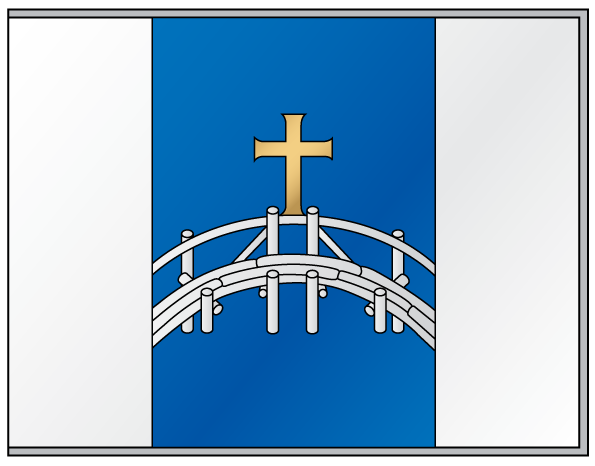
- Flag Coat of arms

- Location of Antalieptė, Lithuania
- Coordinates: 55°39′40″N 25°52′01″E
- Country: Lithuania
- Ethnographic region: Aukštaitija
- Town: Utena County
- Municipality: Zarasai district municipality
- First mentioned: 1897

Population (2011)
  - Total: 278
- Time zone: UTC+2 (EET)
  - Summer (DST): UTC+3 (EEST)
- Website: http://www.antaliepte.lt

Antalieptė ([anˈtaːlʲɛpteː]) (Polish: Antolepty) is a small town in Zarasai district municipality, near the Duseta–Daugailiai road and the right bank of the Šventoji riverhead. The town is also 4 km from the village of Zabičiūnai.

Antalieptė has a secondary school and post office (postode: LT-32013). In Šventoji valley there is the Antalieptė Cross Discovery church, also there was Antalieptė Discalced Carmelites monastery. Antalieptė also has House of Culture, library (from 1941) and a water mill (built 1855 from broken and round rocks, red bricks and lime; mill was working until 1966).

== History ==
According to the 1897 census, 85.5% of the population of the town was Jewish. The Jews immigrated before World War II or were murdered during the Holocaust in Nazi occupied Lithuania by both Germans and Lithuanians.
