= Zarasai District Municipality =

Coordinates: 55°43′52″N 26°11′17″E

Zarasai District Municipality Zarasų rajono savivaldybė
- Municipality
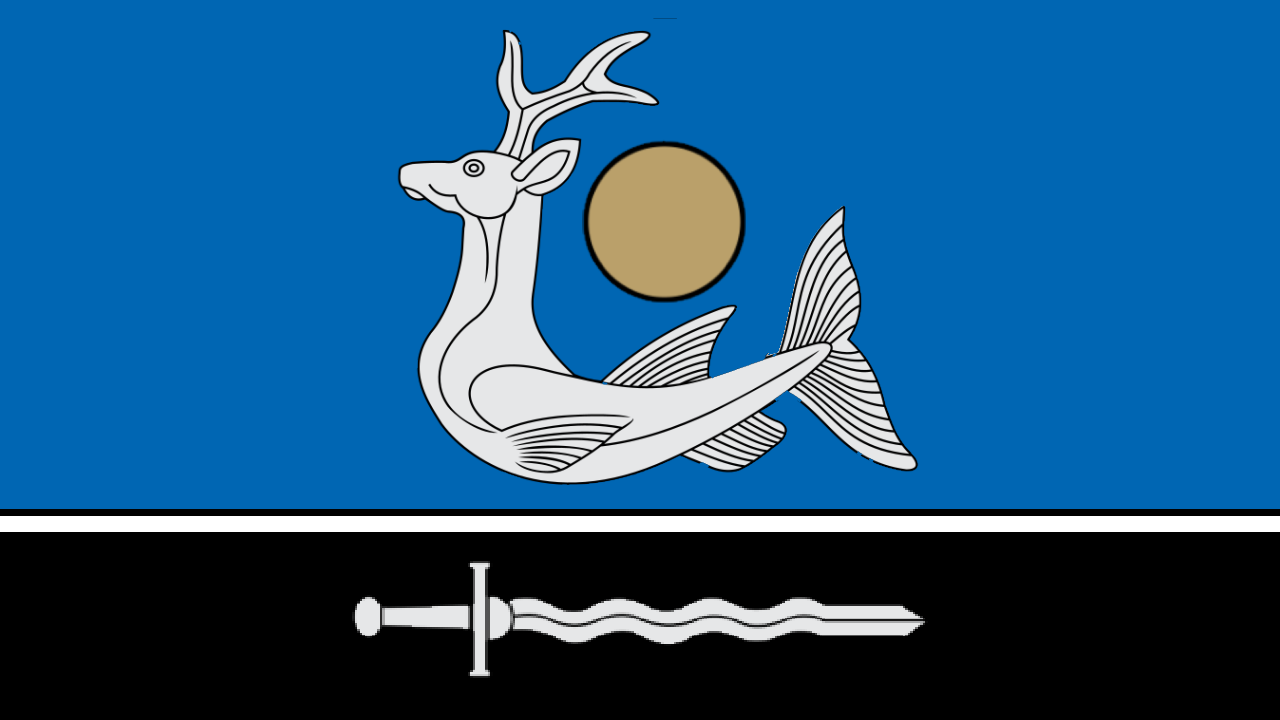
- Flag Coat of arms

- Location of Zarasai district municipality within Lithuania

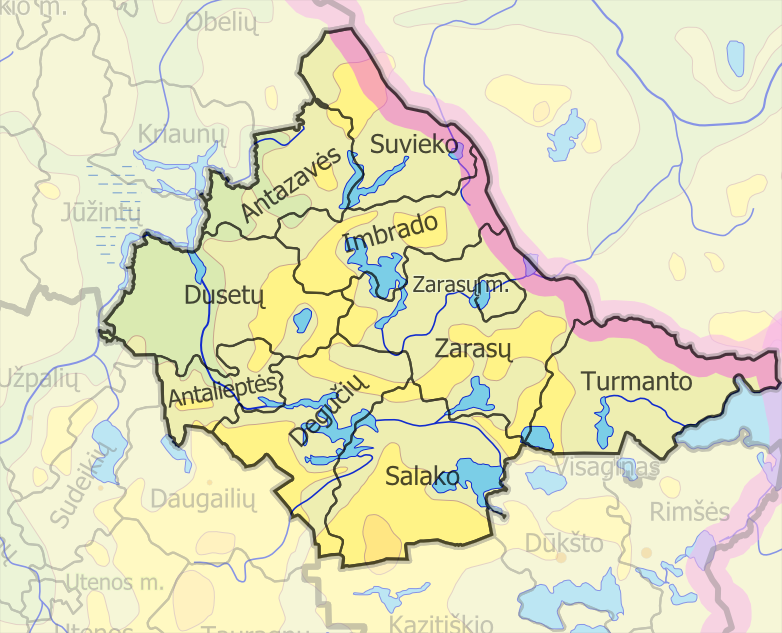
- Map of Zarasai district municipality
- Country: Lithuania
- Ethnographic region: Aukštaitija
- County: Utena County
- Capital: Zarasai
- Elderships: 10

Area
  - Total: 1,334 km^{2} (515 sq mi)
  - Rank: 24th

Population (2021)
  - Total: 15,114
  - Rank: 52nd
  - Density: 11.33/km^{2} (29.34/sq mi)
  - Rank: 58th
- Time zone: UTC+2 (EET)
  - Summer (DST): UTC+3 (EEST)
- Telephone code: 385
- Major settlements: Zarasai (pop. 5,947)
- Website: www.zarasai.lt

Zarasai District Municipality is one of 60 municipalities in Lithuania. It borders with Latvia and Belarus.

It has significant Russian minority population in Lithuania, with sixth of the population claiming Russian ethnicity.

== Local government units ==
The district has the following localities:

- 2 cities (miestas): Zarasai (capital) and Dusetos
- 4 towns (miestelis): Antalieptė, Aviliai (since 2024), Salakas, and Turmantas
- about 800 rural settlements (villages and single-family farmsteads)

Biggest population (2001):

- Zarasai – 8365
- Dusetos – 2054
- Salakas – 604
- Dimitriškės – 470
- Antazavė – 461
- Turmantas – 397
- Aviliai – 373
- Antalieptė – 359
- Degučiai – 324

== Notable tree ==
Stelmužė Oak, the oldest tree in Lithuania, grows in the district.

== Gallery ==
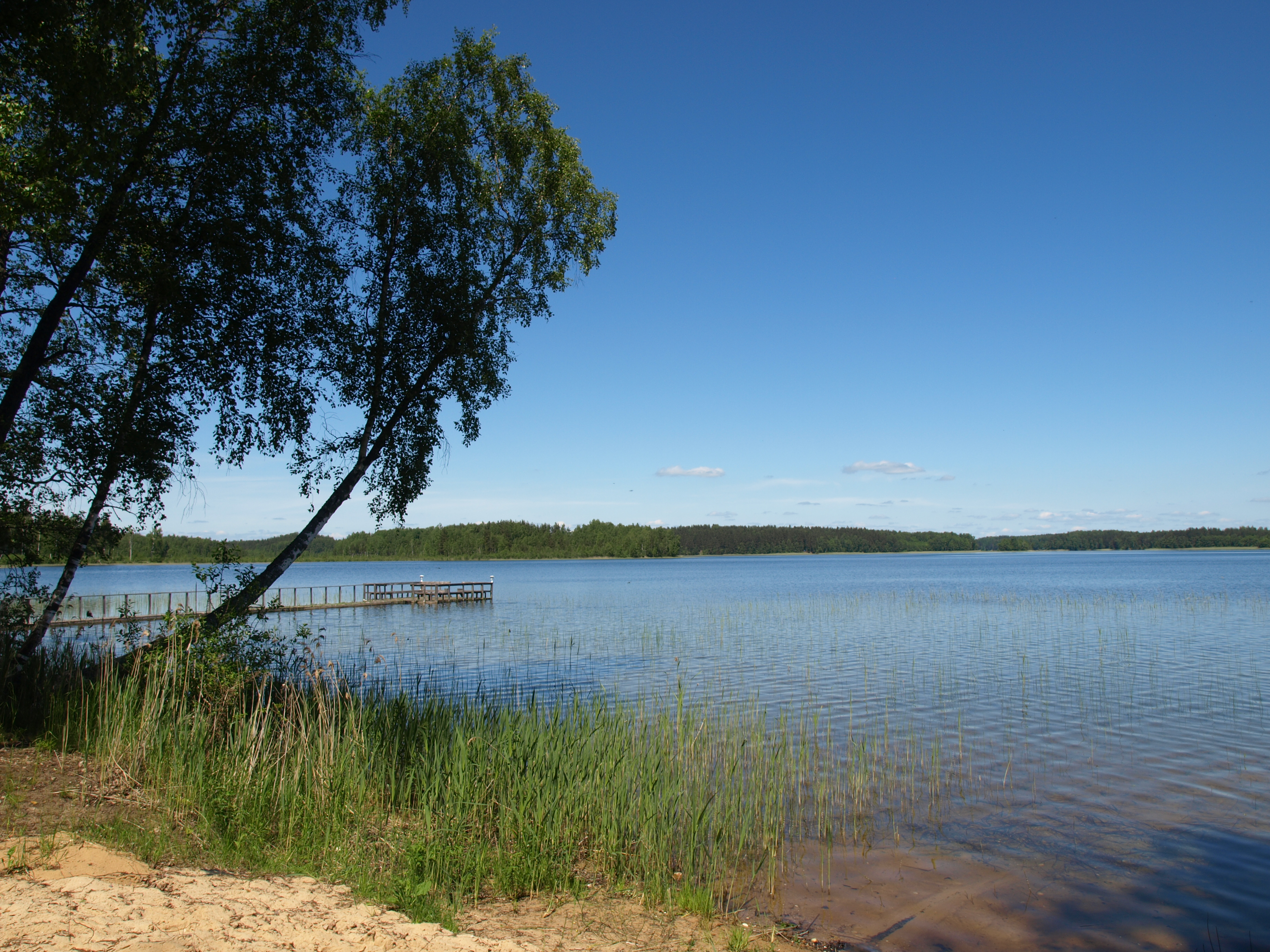
Smalvas

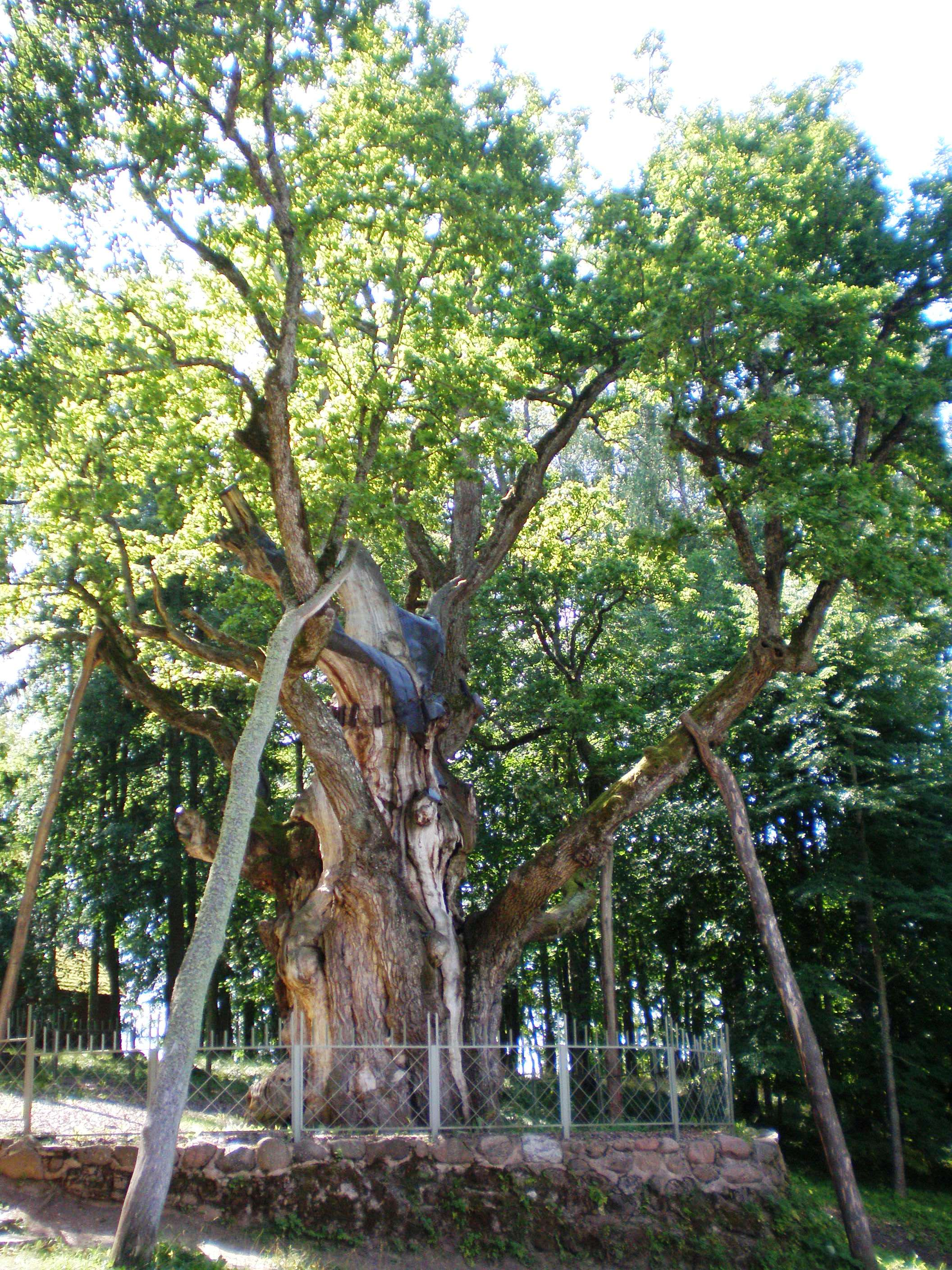
Stelmužė Oak

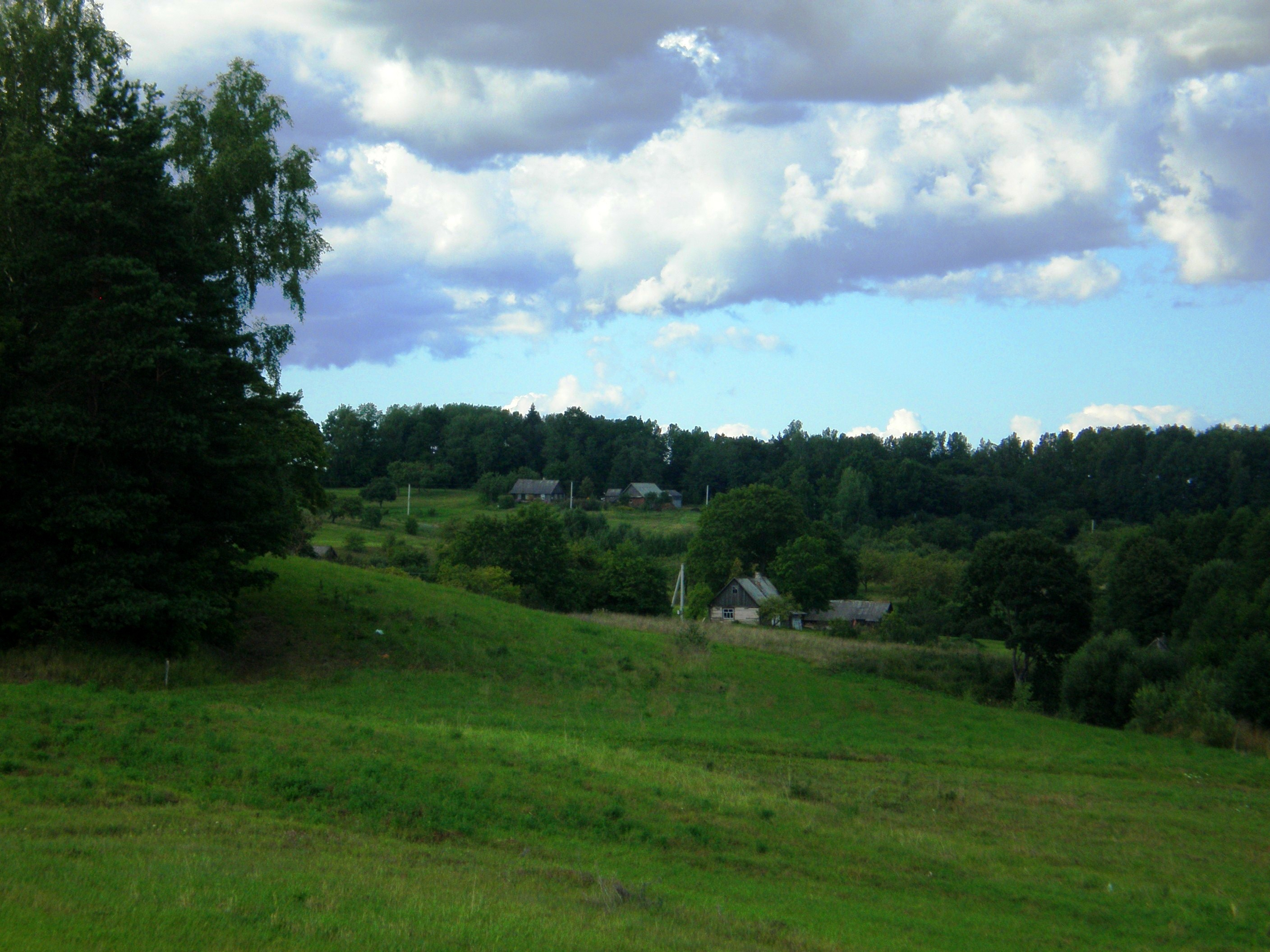
Landscape near Turmantas
