= Šviesa Artists' Society =

Lithuanian music and drama society

- Panevežys Artists Lovers Society "Šviesa"
- Panevėžio artistų mylėtojų draugija „Šviesa“
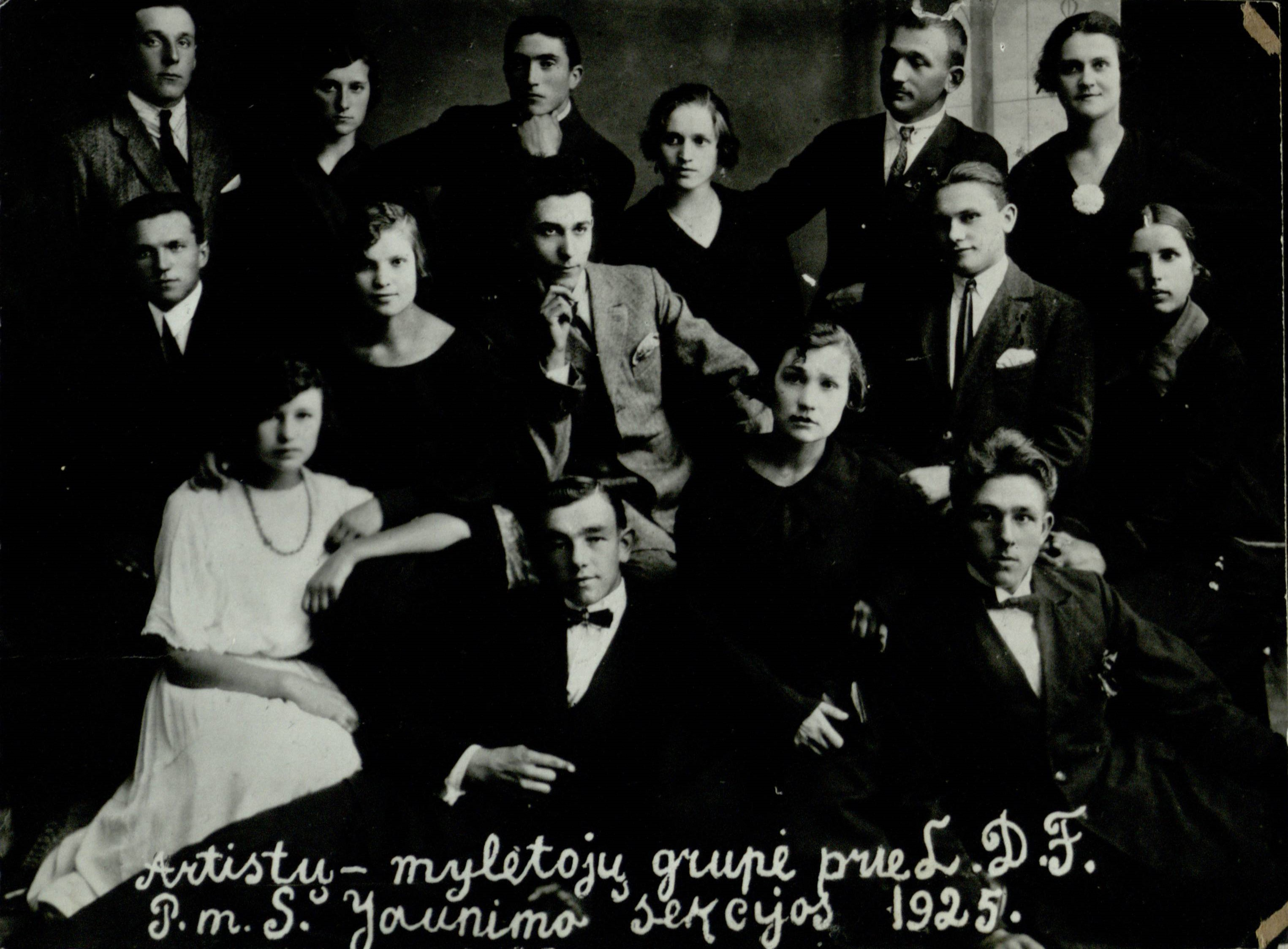
- Formation: 1924
- Founder: Andrius Domaševičius
- Dissolved: 1926
- Headquarters: Panevėžys

The Šviesa Artists' Society (Lithuanian: Panevėžio artistų mylėtojų draugija „Šviesa“; lit. 'Panevežys Artists Lovers Society "Šviesa"') was a short-lived music and drama society established in 1924 by Andrius Domaševičius in Panevėžys.

== History ==
A socialist, Andrius Domaševičius actively participated in organizing workers' trade unions and other workers' activities. In 1924 he established the Šviesa Artists' Society. The society also had chapters in Ūta, Biržai, and Naujamiestis. Although Domaševičius was its chairman, the society was headed by electrician J. Tarvydavičius, and later by actor Stasys Petraitis. The society acted out various plays, such as Marat, Tadas Blinda, Oscar Milosz's Two Brothers, Konstantinas Jasiukaitis's Alkani žmonės (Hungry People), Penktas įsakymas (The Fifth Order) and others. The society also had an orchestra, which was headed by Koveris and later by P. Rutkauskas. The members also would recite Julius Janonis's poems. On 17 February 1925, along with the Panevėžys Workers' Trade Union, the society (then referred to as the Panevėžys Workers' Drama and Music Society „Šviesa“; Panevėžio darbininkų dramos muzikos draugija "Šviesa") was erased from the official society register. After the 1926 Lithuanian coup d'état, the society was fully dissolved.
