= Jakšto Street =

Street in Vilnius, Lithuania

Coordinates: 54.68893600015811°N 25.275581074211118°E

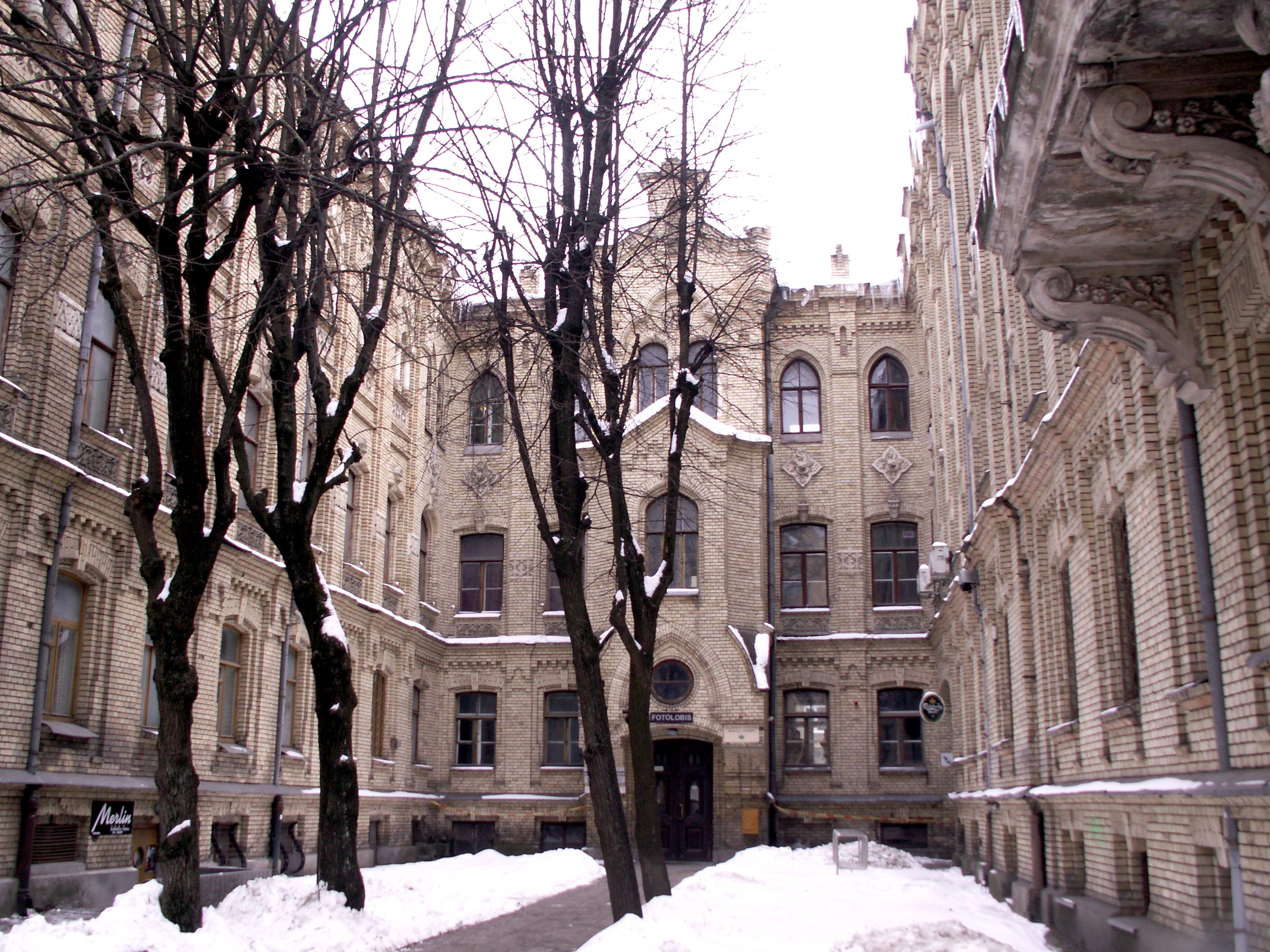
Prozorov Building

Jakšto Street (Lithuanian: Jakšto gatvė) is a short street in the central part of Vilnius, named after the Lithuanian Catholic theologist and philosopher Adomas Jakštas. It is some 350 metres long and leads from the principal Gediminas Avenue towards the Neris river, sloping by some 7 metres towards the north. The street is flanked by buildings built between the 1890s and the 2000s. Throughout its history and according to political preferences of Vilnius authorities, it was named Старый Переулок (Old Backyard), Улица Херсонская (Kherson Street), Krähenstraße (Crow Street), ulica Dąbrowskiego (Dąbrowski Street), Dambrausko-Jakšto gatvė (Dambrauskas-Jakštas Street), Komunarų gatvė (Communards Street) and Jakšto gatvė (Jakštas Street).

Two houses which merit attention are the historicist building designed by Mikhail Prozorov in the 1890s and the functionalist building by Jerzy Sołtan, constructed in the 1930s. The street featured prominently in the history of Vilnius on January 1, 1919, when it became a battleground between the local workers' soviet and the local Polish militia. Over time the street hosted some locally important institutions: the Russian high school Гимназiя Прозоробой (early 20th century), the radical left-wing Vilnius Soviet of Workers Deputies (1918–1919), the Lithuanian high school Vytauto Didžiojo Gimnazija (1931–1944), and the key Russian-language Lithuanian SSR daily Sovetskaya Litva (1949–1987). However, for city dwellers of some 5 generations the street has been rather associated with performance hall, hosting various types of shows; it was named "Apollo" (Russian rule), "Słońce" (Polish rule), "Pionierius" (Soviet rule) and "Vaidilos" (Lithuanian rule).

== Лукишки / Łukiszki / Lukiškės ==
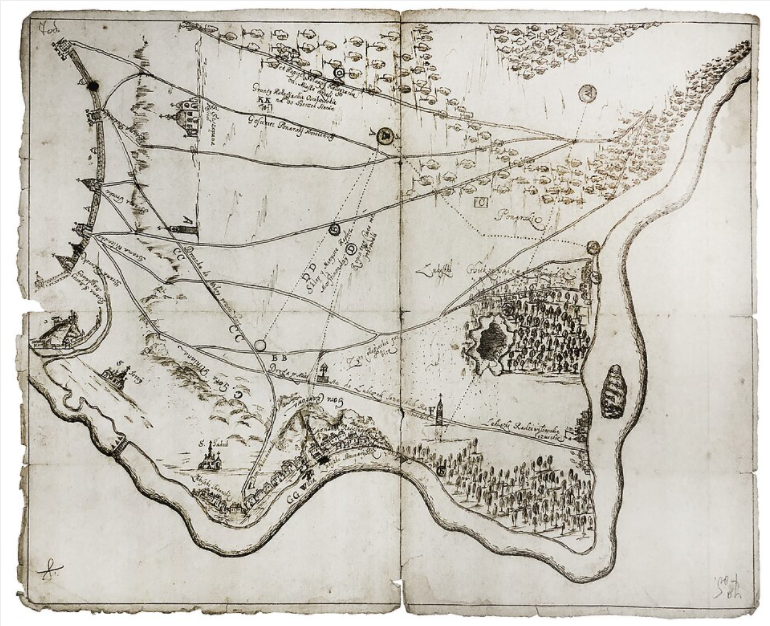
future Jakšto Street, 18th c.

Until the late 19th century the Vilnius layout was oriented along the north–south axis; the city backbone was formed by a sequence of streets (now known as Pilies Street, Didžioji Street, Aušros Vartų Street) running from the cathedral to the О́страя бра́ма gate. Living memory of the city walls, demolished in the early 19th century, marked the inner-city; it was surrounded by mostly wooden suburbs. On the north-west the city was bordered by some 10-hectare rural area named Lukiškės (pol. Łukiszki), which hosted few isolated hamlets. Earlier drawings show in the area now occupied by the Jakšto street the presence of mounds, named Gura Czartowa (Devil's Hill) and Gura Gliniana (Clay Hill), but there is no trace of them on later maps. A map from 1808 marks "Zaułek Wroni" (Crow Pathway) in what is now the Jakšto Street. In the mid-19th century the landmark of the neighbourhood was a religious compound, which consisted of the church of St. Jacob and St. Philip, the Dominican monastery and the hospital for the poor. It stood among fields, meadows and some low wooden houses, crossed by few country roads. A map from the 1840s shows what is now the Jakšto Street as one of these nameless roads, leading among fields and orchards towards few buildings, located on the bank of the Neris river.

== Development plans ==
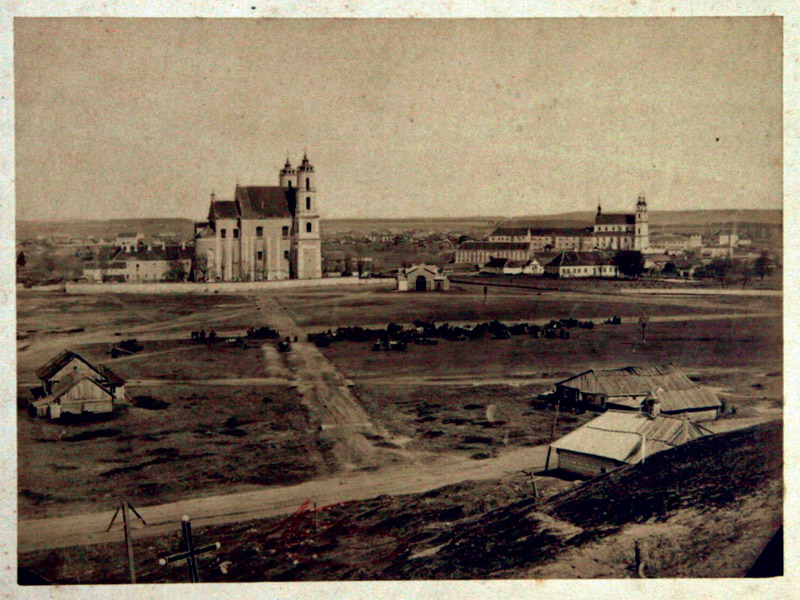
future Jakšto street, 1860s

The rural area north-west of Vilnius started to undergo major change in the second half of the 19th century. A country road leading from the city westwards already in the 1830s was marked as a future major communications route, though for decades it spelled no practical change. In the 1860s it was named Георгиевский проспект (St. George Avenue), in the years to come to become a major city alley. A field next to the Lukiškės Prison was marked as the key Vilnius marketplace; some 15 minute walk from the cathedral, it soon became busy with hundreds of farmers selling straight from their horsecarts and city dwellers walking from the old town to make purchases. A new municipal development plan, adopted in 1875, set the area as the focus of further expansion. In the 1880s first large, multi-storey residential buildings started to appear along the St. George Avenue, first close to the cathedral, and then gradually further west. However, photos from 1866 to 1886 show the neighbourhood of St. Jacob and Philip church, including the later Jakšto Street area, as cultivated fields crossed by some country roads; here and there they were dotted with trees or what looks like single manors, stables, and warehouses.

== Старый Переулок ==
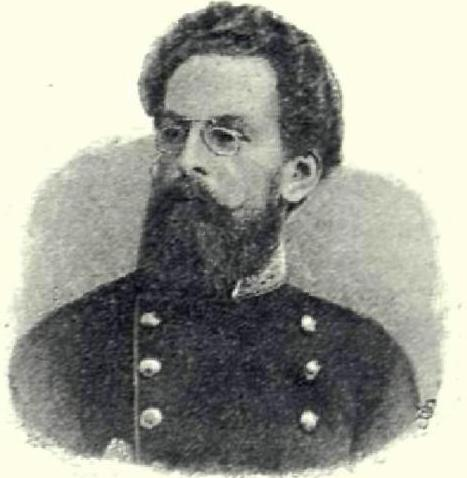
Mikhail Prozorov

In the 1890s rural perpendicular roads, running between the St. George Avenue and the Neris river, gradually began to lose their rural character. A map from the 1890s for the first time assigned a name to what later became the Jakšto Street; it is marked as Старый Переулок (Old Backstreet). However, a map issued in Polish named it Zaułek Nadbrzeżny (Riverbank Backstreet). The western side of the street was marked in green (rural), the eastern one in red (urban), even though it hosted merely few shabby wooden constructions. In the late 1890s the place attracted attention of Mikhail Prozorov, official architect of the Vilnius Orthodox eparchy and already the author of a few monumental buildings in the city. In 1896 his wife Sofia purchased two neighbouring plots. Prozorov designed a group of 3 adjacent 2-floor buildings, to be located there; the first one was completed in 1897–1898. The other two were constructed shortly afterwards, the entire complex based on an H-like layout. Though Prozorov later became an expert in reinforced concrete, the buildings were erected in traditional technology, with bricks. Designed in eclectic historicist style, they became one of the largest and most prestigious new sites in Vilnius of the time.

== Kherson street ==
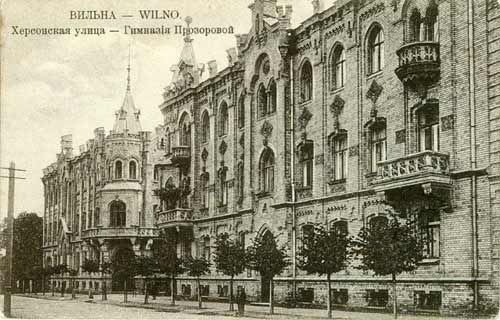
Prozorova gymnasium

In unclear circumstances some time at the turn of the centuries the street was renamed; on the Russian map from 1904 it no longer appears as Старый Переулок, but is marked as Улица Херсонская (Kherson Street). Also on the Polish-language map from 1907 the lane is marked similarly, as Ulica Chersońska. At the time the quarter was half-urban; a photo from 1903 shows elegant long-facade multi-storey residential buildings facing what appears to be fields or meadows. However, during the following decade the street became a typical urban lane. Large, 2-floor or 3-floor tenements flanked long sections of the street, while cobble stone surface, pavements and gas lights completed the picture. The street became sort of a cultural landmark. The building at the corner of Херсонская and Георгиевский became home to a high school for girls, called Гимназiя Прозоровой (Prozorova Gymnasium). The central hall in the Prozorov building (in 1912 sold to a certain Bogdan Ratyński) initially hosted an exposition pavilion, but later formed part of the "Apollo" hall, used for theatrical performances, variétés and as a cinema. The complex hosted also head office of Polesie Railway, a local railway company, apart from a club and canteen of the railwaymen trade union. Numerous shops were located at ground floor.

== Krähenstraße ==
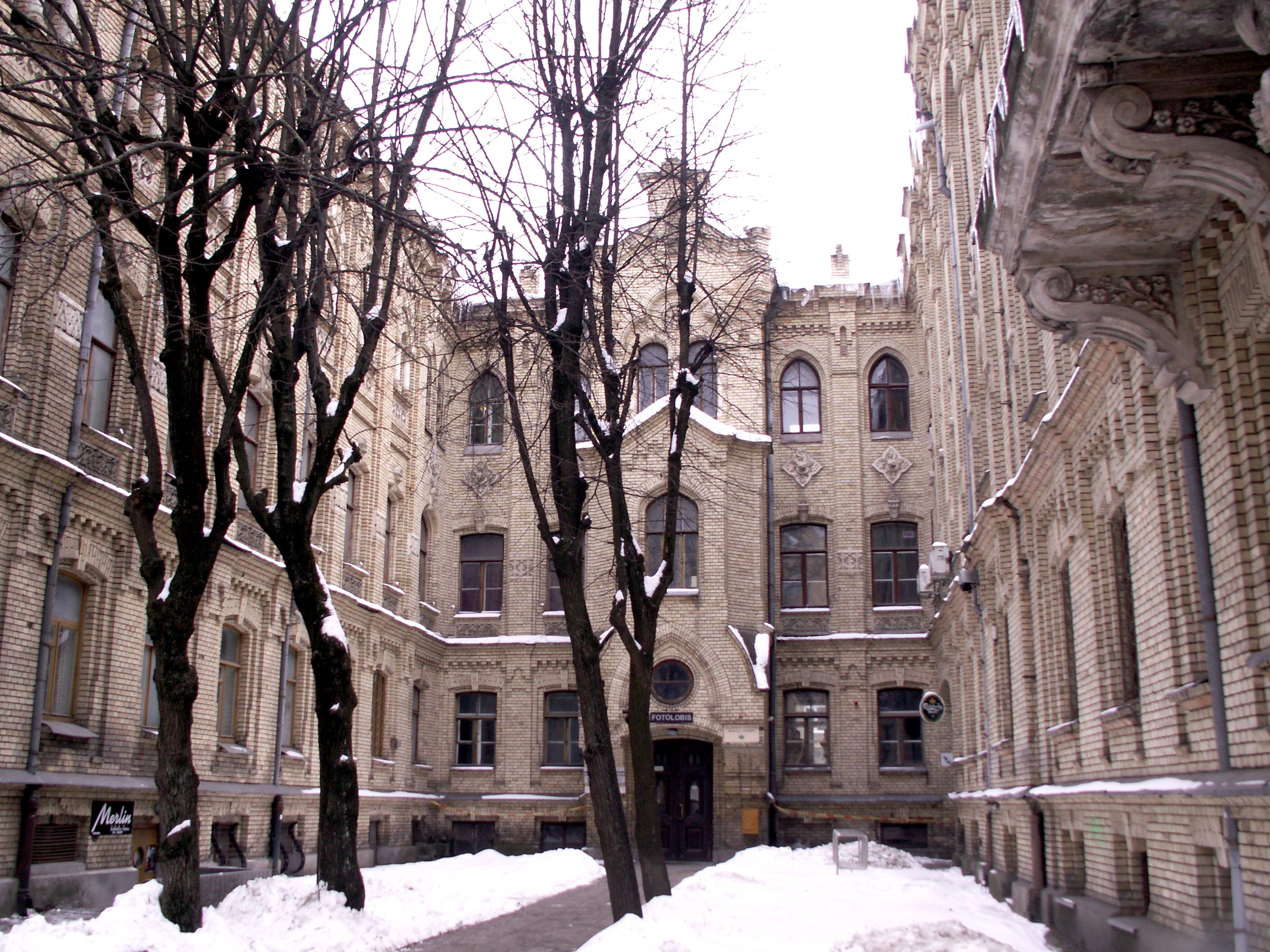
Crow Nest

In September 1915 Vilnius was seized by the German army. Many Russian institutions ceased to operate, including the Prozorova Gymnasium. Instead, Polish institutions mushroomed. One of them was a high school for girls, set up by Anna Czarnowska; it took over the former Prozorova's premises, later replaced by the Nazaretan order high school. Though initially the street retained the name of Khersonstraße, in 1916 it was renamed to Krähenstraße (Crow Street); the name appeared also in Lithuanian (Varnių gatvė) and Polish (ulica Wronia). In 1918, following growing social unrest and gradual decomposition of German rule, the Prozorov building became a hub of workers’ organisations. The place was headquarters of the Vilnius Soviet of Workers Deputies, a far-left body which claimed authority over Vilnius; few meters away resided the competitive Polish body, Komitet Polski. The Germans tolerated the soviet, but once their troops started to abandon the city during very last days of 1918, local Polish militia closed in. Ironically dubbed “Crow Nest” by the Poles, the building was subject to intense half-a-day shootout and on January 1, 1919, it was seized by the militia. However, 4 days later Vilnius fell to advancing Bolshevik army.

== Ulica Dąbrowskiego ==
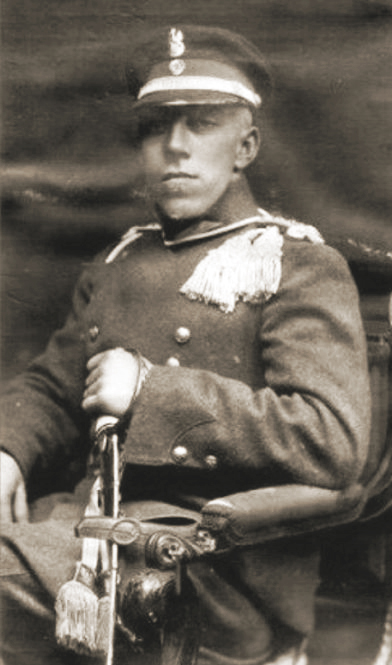
Jerzy Dąbrowski

Following turbulent years of 1919–1921, in 1922 Vilnius was incorporated into Poland. In memory of Jerzy Dąbrowski, commander of the January 1919 assault, the street was named after him. Its both ends remained partially underdeveloped. The south-western corner was owned by the curia and got rented to various tenants; periodically it hosted a cycling parkour, a café "Leonarda" and even vegetable plots. The south-eastern one hosted a low building and a makeshift annex, home to a legendary "Zacisze" restaurant. The Prozorov building hosted a music hall, a revue and a cinema. The school premises, briefly occupied by the Lelewel Gymnasium, at the turn of the decades were purchased by Konstantinas Stašys. Since 1931 they hosted Vytauto Didžiojo Gimnazija, the only Lithuanian high school in the city, which became an important spot for this tiny Vilnius minority. In 1936 a military plane crashed into the Prozorov building; both pilots perished. In 1938 shabby houses at the corner with Mickiewicza were demolished to make room for headquarters of Social Insurance; a large functionalist building accommodated medical premises, offices, conference hall and emergency ward. A neighbouring villa hosted apartments for management and a garage for ambulances. Another modernist villa was built near the northern end. The street assumed a somewhat prestigious status; it also kept accommodating educational institutions.

== Dambrausko-Jakšto gatvė ==
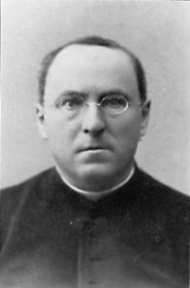
Adomas Jakštas

In September 1939 the Prozorov building served as centre of a paramilitary organisation Przysposobienie Wojskowe; there was some fighting in the neighbourhood when Red Army tanks approached the Green Bridge. Once the USSR handed over the city to Lithuania the new authorities renamed 490 streets. Dąbrowskiego became Dambrausko-Jakšto gatvė (Dambrauskas-Jakštas Street); the name honoured a 1938-deceased Catholic philosopher and scientist and took advantage of the coincidence of surnames. On the Polish national day of November 11 riots broke out in the city; the rebellious youth stormed the Social Insurance building before they were evicted by the Lithuanian police. During the German occupation numerous Polish conspiracy premises were located on the street, e.g. when returning from the Katyn massacre site in May 1943 the Polish envoy Józef Mackiewicz reported to underground officials in a flat in one of the tenements there. On February 12, 1944, unusual Polish-German talks were held in the villa in the backyard of the Insurance building; the commander of Abwehrstelle Wilna col. Julius Christiansen tried to convince the commander of the Home Army Wileński District, col. Aleksander Krzyżanowski, that Polish Home Army units should co-operate with Wehrmacht to fight the Soviet guerilla. In June 1944 the Insurance building served as detention centre for suspicious individuals.

== Komunarų gatvė ==
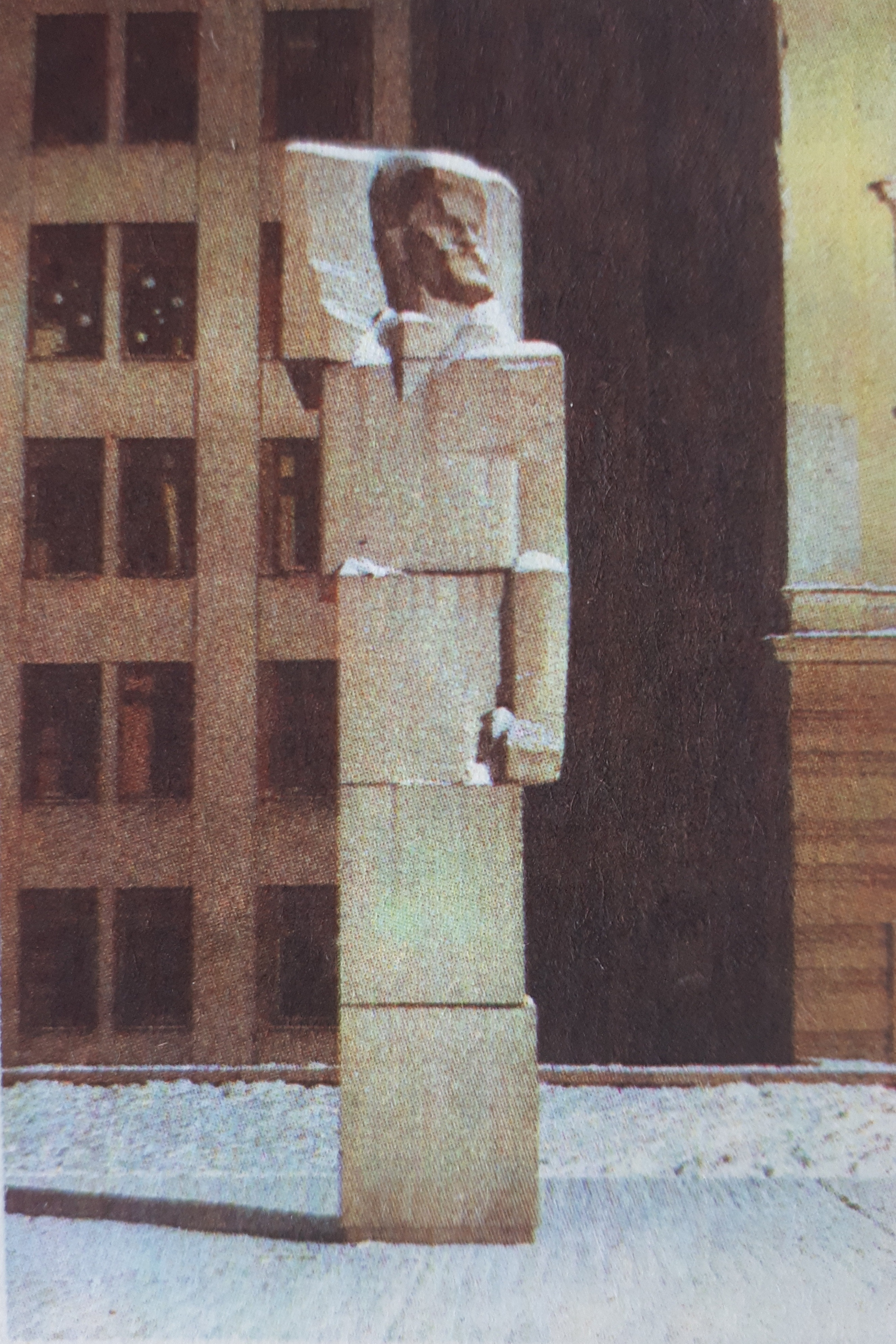
Angarietis monument

Following re-incorporation of Lithuania into the USSR, in 1949 the authorities changed the street name: instead of a Catholic priest, as Komunarų gatvė (Communards Street) it now honoured the revolutionaries who lost their lives on January 1, 1919. In 1953-1959 there were large, 3-floor buildings built on both sides of the northern end of the street; a slightly more monumental office building was constructed opposite the former Social Insurance building, on the southern end. In 1973 an underdeveloped plot opposite the Prozorov building was turned into a square; it was dotted with an obelisk-line monument to Zigmas Angarietis. In 1977 the street gave name to a theatrical play, which presented an apologetic reconstruction of the January 1919 defence. At the time the street again acquired sort of prestigious status, as it hosted numerous central offices of the Lithuanian Soviet Socialist Republic: Ministry of Construction, Ministry of Furniture and Wood Processing, Ministry of Food Industry and Foreign Tourism Administration Office. The former Social Insurance building kept serving as medical centre. The Prozorov building was partially turned into the House of Culture; it accommodated a number of institutions, including periodically also a cinema. In 1949-1987 it hosted premises of the daily Sovetskaya Litva ("Soviet Lithuania").

== Jakšto gatvė ==
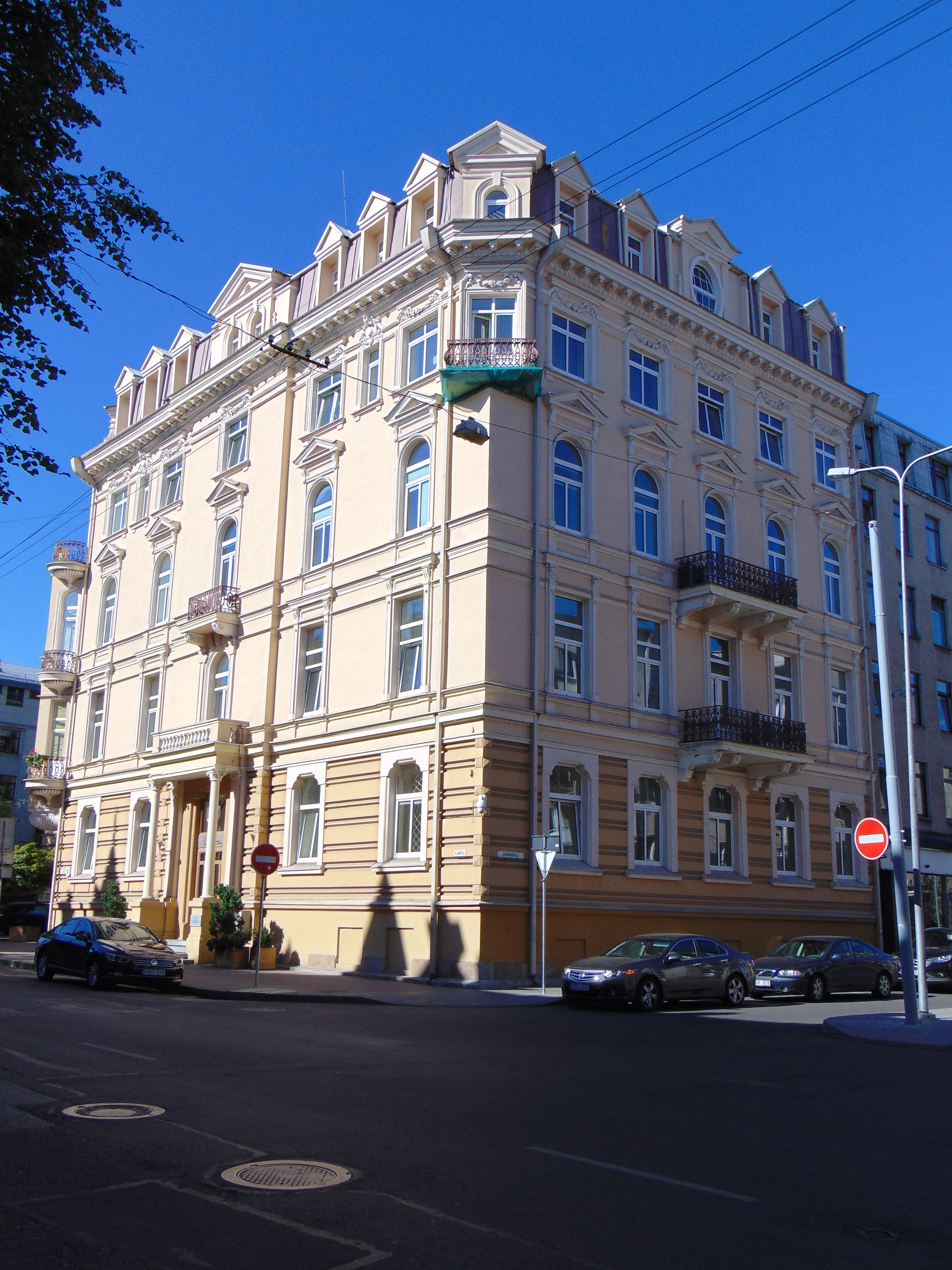
SIS HQ

In reborn Lithuania most streets bearing Soviet-flavoured names were renamed; Komunarų gatvė returned almost exactly to its previous name and became Jakšto gatvė. The Angarietis monument was also dismantled and removed. In the mid-1990s a large new building was constructed on site of derelict tenement; in the early 21st century the square which hosted the Angeretis monument was taken over by a luxurious apartment residence, with an abstract sculpture named "Ryšys" ("Link", "Connection") by Marijonas Šlektavičius situated at the front. Commemorative plaques honouring Lithuanian personalities (Juozas Rudzinskas, Konstantinas Stašys, Antanas Vienuolis-Žukauskas) were mounted on various facades. The street retained its somewhat prestigious character: it hosts Ministry of Environment, Customs Department of the Ministry of Finance, and Special Investigation Service. Most buildings changed owners and underwent refurbishment; in 2023 office space was rented between 10 and €30 /m^{2} per month, while catering premises went for sale at some €4,000 /m^{2}. Among hundreds of companies registered at Jakšto there are numerous law firms, trading companies and finance institutions. The Prozorov building is home to Vaidila Theater, which serves mostly as luxurious space for corporate events, weddings etc., though at times it accommodates also theatrical performances. The compound is to host a lavish hotel in the future.

== Current street line-up ==
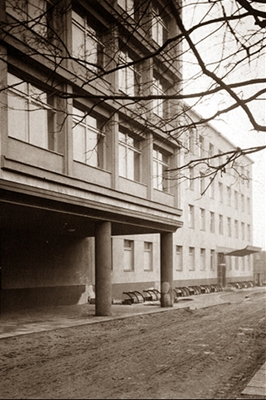
Ubezpieczenia Społeczne building

The postal code to all Jakšto Street buildings is 01105. The below table shows the buildings lined up. For convenience, the table is structured to correspond to the standard, north-oriented view of a map. Construction years are indicated in brackets. Note that there is no building numbered Jakšto Street 10. The building numbered Jakšto Street 16 stands in the backyard between the villa #14 and the residential block numbered Goštauto Street 3.

western side	eastern side
[# as Goštauto gatvė 3]: residential block (1954–1956)	# 13: residential block (1956–1958)
#14: residential villa (1937–1938)	# 13: residential block (1956–1958)
#12: office building (1993–1994)	# 11: tenement (1912–1913)
#8: tenement (1908–1911)	# 11: tenement (1912–1913)
#6: tenement (1908–1910)	# 5, 7, 9: complex of adjacent Prozorov buildings (1897–1902)
#6A: apartment building (2003–2004)	# 5, 7, 9: complex of adjacent Prozorov buildings (1897–1902)
#4: office building (1958–1959)	# 5, 7, 9: complex of adjacent Prozorov buildings (1897–1902)
#2: villa for Ubezpieczenia Społeczne management (1937–1938)	# 1, 3: office and residential building (1958–1959)
[# as Gedimino prospektas 27]: Ubezpieczenia Społeczne (1937–1938)	# 1, 3: office and residential building (1958–1959)

== Scenes from street history ==
scenes from the Jakšto Street
1865, Jakšto Street will be here	1913, Prozorova Gymnasium	1928, marketplace nearby	1932, Marcelinas Šikšnys at Vytautas Gymnasium
1936, aviation disaster	1937, Stanisław Bukowski designing #14 villa	1951, Communist youth congress	1952, last moments of "Zacisze"
