= Communist Party of Lithuania (1919) =

The Communist Party of Lithuania (Lithuanian: Lietuvos komunistų partija, abbreviated LKP, often referred to as the "LKP of A. Domaševičius" or "LSDP-LKP" to differentiate it from the more well-known Communist Party of Lithuania) was a short-lived political party in the Soviet Lithuania/Socialist Soviet Republic of Lithuania and Belorussia.

The party emerged from a January 1919 split in the Lithuanian Social Democratic Party (LSDP). On 6 January 1919, following the capture of Vilnius by the Red Army in the early stages of the Polish–Soviet War, Andrius Domaševičius read a declaration to the Vilna Soviet of Workers Deputies on behalf of the LSDP faction which recognized the Provisional Revolutionary Workers and Peasants Government led by Vincas Mickevičius-Kapsukas. The declaration stated that the Mickevičius-Kapsukas government had "with the help of its troops, wrested Vilnius from the hands of Polish imperialism and at the same time freed the working masses from attempts to enslave them by the Lithuanian Taryba."

The Domaševičius-led LSDP faction adopted the tactics and discourse of the Communist Party of Lithuania and Belorussia including the recognition of Soviet power as a form of dictatorship of the proletariat. The group supported the merger of the Lithuanian and Belorussian soviet republics. The Polish language LSDP organ Echo robotnicze remained with the party.

On 30 January 1919 a party conference of the Vilnius and Naujoji Vilnia branches of LSDP and some LSDP central committee members resolved to adopt the name 'Communist Party of Lithuania', decided to begin unification negotiations with the Communist Party of Lithuania and Belorussia, and declared themselves separated from the pro-Taryba faction of LSDP. At a party conference held on 22–23 February 1919 a resolution was adopted calling for the merger into the Communist Party of Lithuania and Belorussia. The Central Committee of the Communist Party of Lithuania and Belorussia agreed to a merger in principle, and debated the merger logistics at multiple occasions. By the time Vilnius was seized by Polish forces in April 1919, the merger had not yet materialized. Domaševičius was arrested was the Polish authorities. The party disintegrated shortly thereafter.
