= Vilnius Soviet of Workers Deputies =

Soviet council in the city of Vilnius

The Vilnius Soviet of Workers Deputies (Lithuanian: Vilniaus darbininkų atstovų taryba, abbreviated VDAT, Russian: Вильнюсский Совет рабочих депутатов) was a soviet (council) in the city of Vilnius. Following end of the First World War on November 11, 1918, a political vacuum emerged in Vilnius, as the German Ober Ost project crumbled. The pro-communist Vilnius Soviet became one of the political forces seeking to govern the city competing with the Lithuanian Taryba and the Polish Samoobrona. A total of 202 deputies were elected to the soviet in December 1918. Whilst the communists formed the largest faction, the Vilnius Soviet was politically diverse. Bundists and communists clashed at the first meeting of the soviet. The soviet also did not welcome the Provisional Revolutionary Workers and Peasants Government of Lithuania headed by Vincas Mickevičius-Kapsukas. As such, new elections were organized after Vilnius was captured by the Red Army on January 5, 1919 during the Soviet westward offensive of 1918–1919. By allowing Red Army soldiers to vote, the communist reinforced their control of the Vilnius Soviet.

== December 1918: elections ==
By late November 1918, communists began preparations for the elections to a workers' soviet. A special commission was set-up to organize elections to the Vilnius Soviet. The commission included representatives of the Communist Party of Lithuania and Belorussia, Lithuanian Social Democratic Party, Social Democratic Labour Party of Lithuania and Belorussia (internationalists) (Menshevik-Internationalists), General Jewish Labour Bund, Revolutionary Socialist People's Party of Lithuania (Left Socialist-Revolutionaries), Jewish Social Democratic Labour Party (Poalei Zion) and other Jewish socialist groups. The commission circulated the provisional statutes for the Vilnius Soviet in the press which gave the Vilnius Soviet the function as the central governing authority in Lithuania until an All-Lithuanian Congress of Soviets could be held.

Only members of the trade unions were allowed to vote in the elections. The elections took place amid tensions between the workers, the German authorities, and factory owners. The elections began to be held in early December 1918 – before the withdrawal of the German troops. Among Polish workers there was an active campaign against the soviet election, spearheaded by the newspaper Dziennik Wileński. Nevertheless, the electoral campaign continued. For example, the railway workers union organized a mass meeting, which elected forty delegates (communists and allies) to the Vilnius Soviet. Among these delegates was Zigmas Angarietis.

All in all, 202 deputies to the Vilnius Soviet were elected. Out of the elected deputies, 96 deputies were from the Communist Party of Lithuania and Belorussia, 60 from the General Jewish Labour Bund, 22 from the Social Democratic Labour Party of Lithuania and Belorussia (internationalists), 15 from the Lithuanian Social Democratic Party, and 9 from other groups (Jewish Social Democratic Labour Party (Poalei Zion), United Jewish Socialist Workers Party, etc).

== Proceedings ==
=== December 15, 1918: first session ===
On December 15, 1918, the Vilnius Soviet held its inaugural session at the Vilnius city hall (the present-day building of the Lithuanian National Philharmonic Society), decorated with red flags and banners with revolutionary slogans. The session was opened with a speech by a veteran labour leader Andrius Domaševičius.

The soviet elected a nine-member presidium of the Vilnius Soviet consisting of five communists, three Bundists and one Menshevik-Internationalist. The Communist Party was represented in the Presidium by Pranas Eidukevičius (chairman), Andriejus Novikovas also known as J. Vileiskis (deputy chairman), Iulius Shimeliovich (secretary, a former Bundist turned communist), Zigmas Angarietis, and E. Senkevičius. The three Bundists were Yankef Vaynshteyn (deputy chairman), Nisn Pups (secretary), and L. Novopoliantas, whilst the sole Menshevik-Internationalist was Edvardas Sokolovskis (deputy chairman).

The meeting declared the Vilnius Soviet as the sole governing authority of the city. The gathering declared the end of censorship, banned food exports out of the city, and issued controls on food prices.

In late 1918, on the suggestion of the Central Committee of the Communist Party of Lithuania and Belorussia, three communists were named as commissars of the Vilnius Soviet – Bonifacas Verbickas (Commissar for City Economy), K. Rimša (Commissar for Prisons) and J. Vileiskis (Commissar for Railways). The soviet attempted to organize militia to control the railway traffic, including German military trains. This resulted in arrests of 30 deputies of the soviet.

=== December 22, 1918: second session ===
On December 22, 1918, the second session of the Vilnius Soviet was held. Non-communist groups proposed a motion which refused to cede power to the newly proclaimed Provisional Revolutionary Workers and Peasants Government of Lithuania headed by Vincas Mickevičius-Kapsukas. Instead, the governing power should belong to a Lithuanian congress of Soviets, and that the Executive Committee of the Vilnius Soviet would govern until such congress could be called. The Vilnius Soviet majority described the Provisional Revolutionary Government as an imposition by "Bolshevik commissars in Moscow". The communist faction rejected the motion, and refused to take part in the vote.

Vilnius Soviet adopted a resolution on political prisoners held at Lukiškės Prison: if the prisoners (including 30 deputies of the soviet) were not freed by December 23, 1918, workers would begin a political strike. Since German authorities refused to comply, a general strike began on December 24, 1918. Electricity systems were shut down. By the evening of December 25, 1918, German authorities released the political prisoners and handed over the management of the prison to the Vilnius Soviet.

Preparing for an armed confrontation with the Polish legionnaires, the Vilnius Soviet proceeded to organize a workers militia. Doctors Stasys Matulaitis and Andrius Domaševičius began organizing a paramedical unit.

=== December 27, 1918: third session ===
The third session of the Vilnius Soviet was held on December 27, 1918. Around this time, German army was handing over resources (supplies, food, funds, etc.) to the bourgeois Vilnius City Duma. The Communist Party presented a motion calling for a confrontation with the bourgeoisie, demanding the transfer of all institutions, resources, and government employees to the Vilnius Soviet, and for looters of food stuffs to be court-martialed. The Bund rejected the communist motion, arguing that the struggle should be directed solely against the German occupation forces, not the local bourgeoisie. The Bundists argued that the communist line would bring a civil war. The communist motion was passed with 110 votes in favour.

== January 1–2, 1919: shoot-out with Polish Samoobrona ==
As German troops retreated from Vilnius, Polish Samoobrona attempted to establish its control over the city. On January 1, 1919, Samoobrona surrounded the Vilnius Soviet, which had barricaded at the Workers' Club building at 5 Wronia (Varnių) Street (later 9 Komunarų Street, present-day Jakšto Street). Inside the building were the Vilnius Soviet deputies and some fifty members of the workers' militia. Around 11 pm the leader of the Polish forces, general Władysław Wejtko, issued an ultimatum to surrender which the soviet refused.

The shoot-out lasted for over twelve hours. A militia unit had been sent to Kirtimai to gather firearms, but was unable to return to the city. Cornered in the basement of the building, rather than surrendering Iulius Shimeliovich (Raisenas), Leonas Čaplinskas, Antanas Liaudanskas, Jankelis Šapira (Asas), and Bonifacas Verbickas used their last remaining bullets to commit suicide. Roman Pilar attempted to shoot himself, but survived.

After the shoot-out, the Polish Samoobrona captured dozens of Vilnius Soviet organizers and seized some 1,000 weapons that the revolutionaries had obtained from the retreating German troops. On January 9, 1919, after the Red Army captured Vilnius, a ceremonial burial for the deceased members of the Vilnius Soviet was organized at the Cathedral Square. During the post-World War II Soviet era, Wronia Street was renamed Komunarų Street in memory of the five men.

== February 1919: reorganization ==
Following the capture of Vilnius by the Red Army on January 5, new elections to the Vilnius Soviet were held in which Red Army soldiers could take part. As of February 4, 1919, the Vilnius Soviet of Workers and Red Army Deputies included 130 communists (in addition to representatives of the Red Army units), 45 representatives of the Bund, 9 Menshevik-Internationalists, 5 Polish Socialist Party of Lithuania and Belorussia, 2 Left Socialist-Revolutionaries, 1 United Jewish Socialist Workers Party, and 4 non-party representatives.

At its first meeting on February 7, 1919, the Vilnius Soviet of Workers and Red Army Deputies elected a 20-member Executive Committee which included 16 communists, 3 Bundists, and 1 Menshevik-Internationalist. On the suggestion of the Central Committee of the Communist Party of Lithuania and Belorussia, Kazimierz Cichowski was elected as chairman, E. Senkevičius as deputy chairman, and Jan Olski as secretary. The Vilnius Soviet took charge as the governing authority of city.

On February 18, 1919, Vilnius Soviet unanimously adopted a resolution approving the merger of the Lithuanian Soviet Socialist Republic with the Socialist Soviet Republic of Belorussia.

== See also ==
- Kaunas Soviet of Workers Deputies

== Bibliography ==
- Balkelis, Tomas (2018). War, Revolution, and Nation-making in Lithuania, 1914-1923. Oxford University Press. ISBN 978-0-19-966802-1.
- Balkelis, Tomas (April 24, 2022). "Kaip vilniečiai bolševikus sutiko: Vilnius 1919 metų pradžioje" (in Lithuanian). 15min.lt.
- Broga, Linas; Danilevičius, Eugenijus (1963). Lietuvos TSR turistinis z̆emėlapis (in Lithuanian). Valstybinė politinės ir mokslinės literatūros leidykla. OCLC 80295871.
- Bulavas, Juozas (1956). Rinkimai ir "tautos atstovavimas" buržuazinėje Lietuvoje. Valstybinė politines ir mokslinės literatūros leidykla. OCLC 29436546.
- Jacobs, Jack (2022). "The Bund in Vilna, 1918–1939". In Liekis, Sarunas; Polonsky, Antony; Freeze, ChaeRan (eds.). Polin: Studies in Polish Jewry Volume 25: Jews in the Former Grand Duchy of Lithuania Since 1772. Liverpool University Press. ISBN 978-1-83764-899-3.
- Kapsukas, Vincas (1958). Pirmoji Lietuvos Proletarinė revoliucija ir tarybų valdžia (in Lithuanian) (2nd ed.). Valstybinė politinės ir mokslinės literatūros leidykla. OCLC 420008.
- MELC (October 11, 2019) [2006]. "komunarai". Visuotinė lietuvių enciklopedija (in Lithuanian). Mokslo ir enciklopedijų leidybos centras.
- Page, Stanley W. (1970). The Formation of the Baltic States: A Study of the Effects of Great Power Politics Upon the Emergence of Lithuania, Latvia, and Estonia. H. Fertig. ISBN 978-0-86527-068-8.
- Papšys, Antanas (1981). Vilnius: A Guide. Progress Publishers. OCLC 9621385.
- Rimkė, Edita (November 25, 2014). "Vilniaus senamiesčio gatvių pavadinimai sovietinėje Lietuvoje" (in Lithuanian). Bernardinai.lt.
- Saldžiūnas, Vaidas (December 29, 2017). "Detektyvas: kodėl nuo Gedimino kalno dingo pagrindinis valstybės simbolis ir kuo čia dėtas Kaunas?" (in Lithuanian). Delfi.lt.
- Senn, Alfred Erich (1975). The Emergence of Modern Lithuania. Greenwood Press. ISBN 978-0-8371-7780-9.
- Sloin, Andrew (2017). The Jewish Revolution in Belorussia: Economy, Race, and Bolshevik Power. Indiana University Press. ISBN 978-0-253-02463-3.
- Vaitkevičius, Bronius (1967). Socialistinė revoliucija Lietuvoje 1918-1919 metais (in Lithuanian). Mintis. OCLC 19496712.
- Vaitkevičius, Bronius (1988). Pirmoji darbininkų ir valstiečių valdžia Lietuvoje: monografija skiriama LKP įkūrimo ir Tarybų valdžios paskelbimo Lietuvoje 70-mečiui (in Lithuanian). Mokslas. ISBN 9785420000359.
- Vileikis, Algirdas (1988). Вильнюс - столица советской Литвы (in Russian). Mintis. ISBN 9785417000409.
- Zinkus, Jonas; et al., eds. (1986). Lithuania: An Encyclopedic Survey. Encyclopedia Publishers. OCLC 469438907.
