= Yankef Vaynshteyn =

Yankef Vaynshteyn (Lithuanian: Jakovas Vainšteinas, Russian: Яков Вайнштейн) was a Jewish socialist leader in Lithuania. He was born in 1897. As of 1918, he was the chairman of the Vilna organization of the General Jewish Labour Bund in Lithuania, Poland and Russia. When the Vilna Soviet of Workers Deputies was constituted on December 15, 1918, Vaynshteyn was elected as deputy chairman of the presidium of the Soviet.

Vaynshteyn later left the Bund and became a communist. He edited the Yiddish language periodical Arbeter Lebn ('Worker's Life') in Kaunas. In May 1920, upon recommendation by the Central Committee of the Communist Party of Lithuania and Belorussia in recognition of his literary activities, he was inducted into the Lithuania Central Bureau of the party. In September 1920, as the party split into the Communist Party of Lithuania and the Communist Party (Bolsheviks) of Belorussia, he was a member of the Central Bureau of the Lithuanian party.
