= Ūta =

- Village
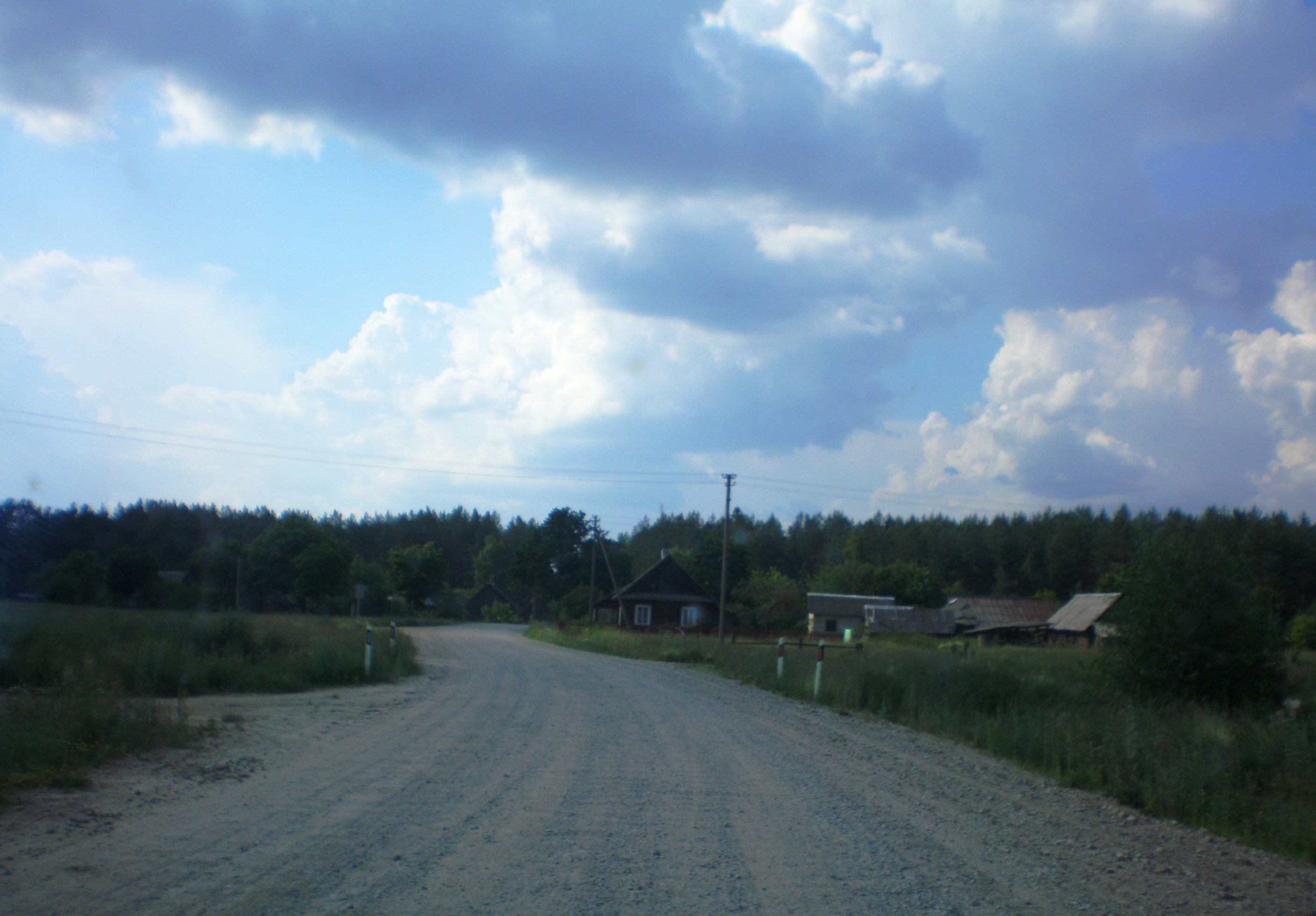

- Location within Varėna District Municipality Location within Lithuania
- Coordinates: 54°06′22″N 24°38′38″E
- Country: Lithuania
- County: Alytus
- Municipality: Varėna
- Eldership: Kaniavos (Kaniava)

Population (2011 Census)
  - Total: 11
- Time zone: UTC+2 (EET)
  - Summer (DST): UTC+3 (EEST)

Ūta is a village in Kaniavos eldership, Varėna district municipality, Alytus County, southeastern Lithuania. According to the 2001 census, the village had a population of 25 people. At the 2011 census, the population was 11.

== Etymology ==
The name Ūta comes from the word Lithuanian: ūta (a borrowing from Polish: huta or Belarusian: гута) and means 'a smelting place, a pitch making place'.
