= Andrius Domaševičius =

Lithuanian politician (1865–1935)

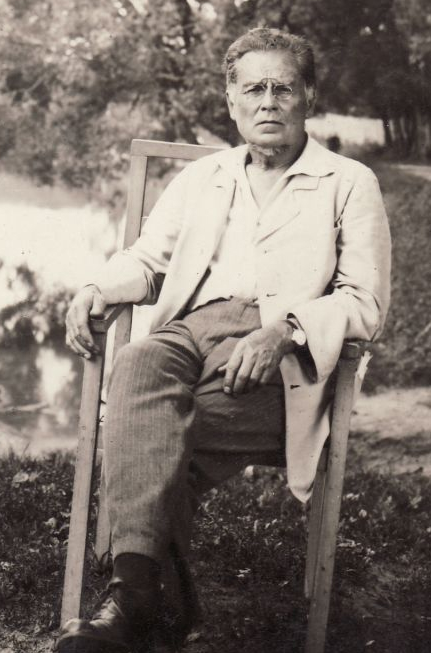
- Domaševičius c. 1920
- Born: 30 November 1865; Panevėžys, Russian Empire
- Died: 19 March 1935 (aged 69); Panevėžys, Lithuania
- Education: Kyiv University
- Occupations: Politician; gynecologist
- Known for: Founder of the Social Democratic Party of Lithuania

Andrius Domaševičius (30 November 1865 – 19 March 1935) was a Lithuanian politician and gynecologist. He was one of the founders and an active member of the Social Democrat movement in Lithuania.

== Early life and studies ==
Andrius Domaševičius was born on 30 November 1865 in Panevėžys, Russian Empire. His family was descendants of polonized szlachta. Domaševičius attended school in Šiauliai from 1876 until 1884. During this time, Domaševičius participated in an illegal student circle and became acquainted with the literature of the Russian Narodniks movement. In 1890, he graduated from the Kyiv University, where he studied medicine. According to contemporaries, it was in Kyiv that Domaševičius became interested in social democratic ideas, as well as revolutionary propaganda and Marxism. After his studies in Kyiv, Domaševičius worked in St. Petersburg with a famous Russian gynecologist professor in a medical clinic. In 1892, Domaševičius returned to Lithuania.

== Political activity ==
After returning to Lithuania, Domaševičius was invited by Alfonsas Moravskis, whom he knew since his days in Panevėžys, to participate in political and social activities. Domaševičius acquired the pseudonym Teodoras and read various lectures in secret meetings, as well as organized educational, economic and political workers' unions. Domaševičius participated in the activities of the Twelve Apostles of Vilnius. In his free time, Domaševičius read Marxist literature as well as philosophy by Immanuel Kant, among others. Although Domaševičius was not particularly religious, he advocated for the return of the Church of St. Nicholas for the Catholics and also sang in its choir.

=== Establishment of the Lithuanian Social Democratic Party and exile ===
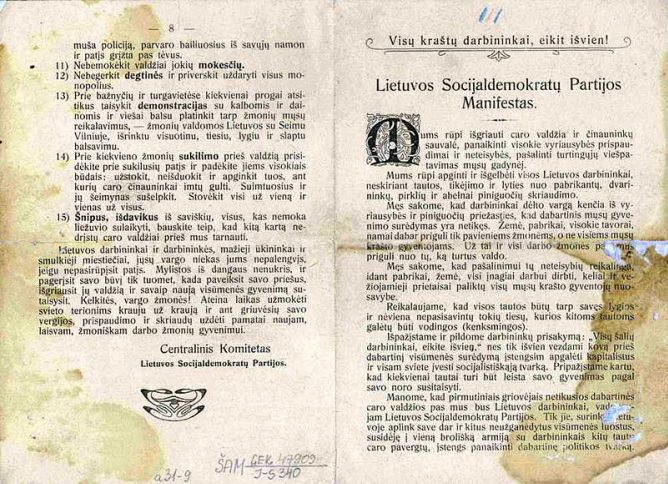
Manifesto of the LSDP, 1905

Domaševičius and Moravskis decided to establish the Social Democratic Party of Lithuania. Moravskis usually agitated workers, while Domaševičius recruited intelligentsia and students. He started active propaganda activities among tanners, cobblers, and carpenters. By the initiative of the Social Democrats, so-called struggle funds were created to support the strikers, and trade unions were established. In 1895, Domaševičius together with Moravskis prepared the outline of the Social Democrat party program in Polish. This program, being the oldest to outline the issue of Lithuanian independence, was based on the German Social Democratic Erfurt Program, program of the Polish Socialist Party, and works by Karl Marx and Friedrich Engels. On 1 May 1896, Domaševičius became one of the founders of the Social Democratic Party of Lithuania (LSDP).

In the same year, he traveled abroad to print social democratic literature and search for connections in Poland and France. In Paris, the first issue of the LSDP newspaper Robotnik Litewski (Worker of Lithuania) and the brochure Robotnik ślusarski w Wilne (Locksmith of Vilnius), prepared by Domaševičius, were published in Polish. In 1897, Domaševičius was arrested and jailed in Vilnius for his political activity for a month and a half, but was released due to insufficient evidence. Domaševičius was arrested again in 1899, and in 1900 he was deported to Siberia. In Siberia, Domaševičius fathered two sons. He lived in Omsk, as well as Karkaraly and Semepalatinsk, in which he freely learned Italian, English, Hebrew, French, German, Polish as well as Lithuanian languages.

=== Return to Lithuania ===
He returned to Vilnius in 1904 and participated in the Great Seimas of Vilnius. Domaševičius also worked as a doctor in the hospital of Saint James the Great. In 1905, Domaševičius contributed to the preparation and wide circulation of a manifesto that advocated for progressive taxation, free education in all schools, free universal medical care, medicine and legal aid. It also outlined methods of struggle against the tsarist government and the enemies of the revolution. Fearing arrest, Domaševičius fled to East Prussia in the same year and returned only a year later, in 1906. The Polish-language newspaper, under the initiative of Domaševičius, called Echo zycia robotniczego na Litwe (Echo of Workers' Life in Lithuania) was published in Tilsit. In 1907, Domaševičius left the leadership of the Social Democrats, and in the same year co-founded the Lithuanian Scientific Society, and from 1908 to 1909 was its vice-chairman. Domaševičius established the society's medicine division, as well as the statistics and economics division in 1913. During this time he advocated for the rights of the Lithuanian language in the churches of the Vilnius Diocese. In 1908, Domaševičius initiated the creation of the Rūta Society.

=== Medical work and return to politics ===
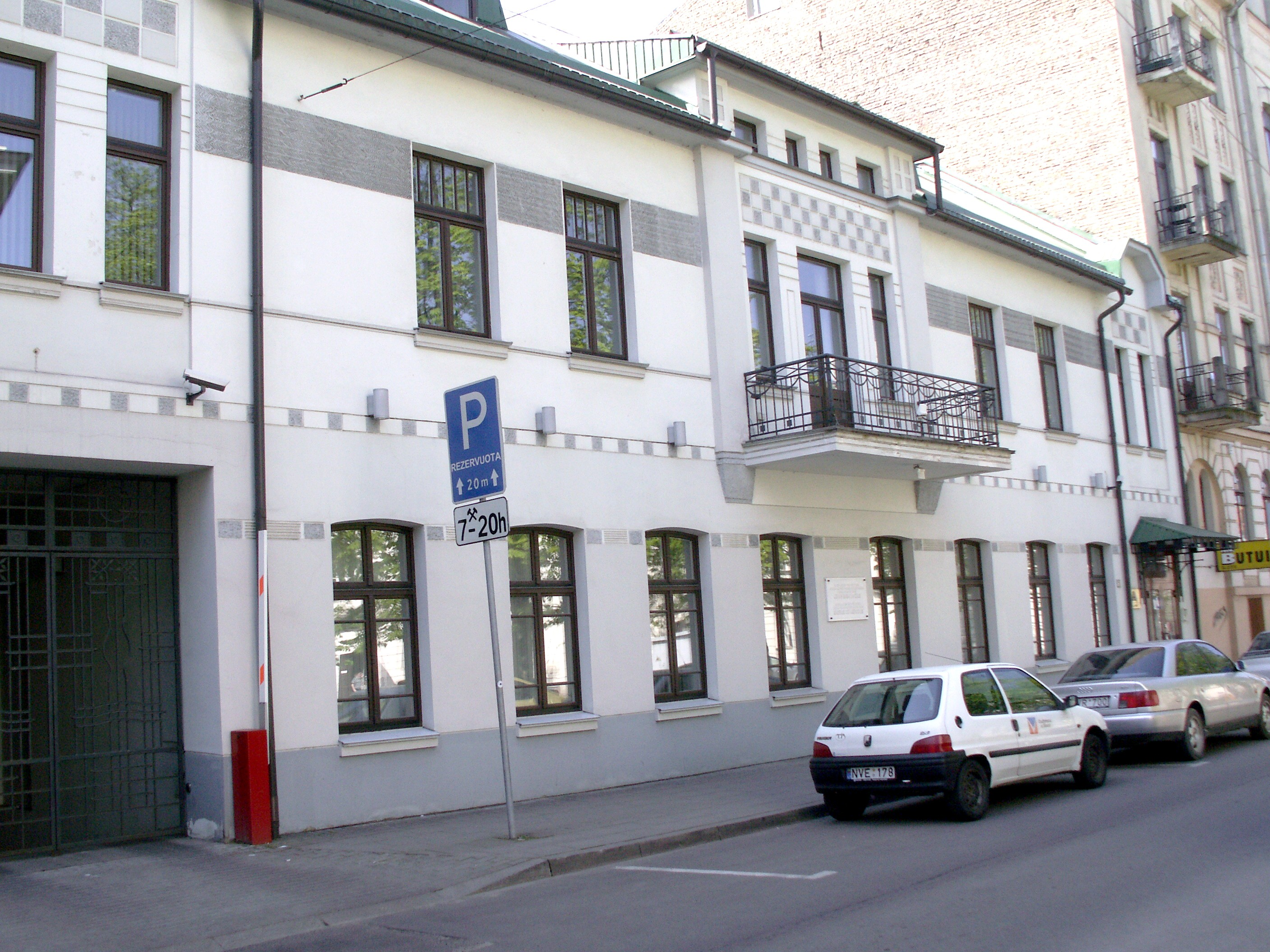
House in Vilnius where Domaševičius lived in 1910–1920

In 1910, he established a private clinic and a hospital specializing in gynecology, in which poor women were treated free of charge. From 1910 to 1911, Domaševičius organized the publication of the magazine Visuomenė (Society). Domaševičius also wrote articles for the magazines Medicina ir gamta (Medicine and Nature) and Darbo balsas (The Voice of Work). The articles related to medicine were not only practical but also intended as guides to fight various diseases such as rheumatism, women's diseases, tuberculosis, and cancer. The author advocated for the state to introduce free medical care and that treatments should not be carried out by village healers, but by medical specialists. Domaševičius, being a polyglot, was a popular and easily accessible doctor in Vilnius. In 1917, he participated in the Vilnius Conference. After the October Revolution in Russia in 1917, Domaševičius joined the Social Democratic movement again, and also was selected as the chairman of workers' council of the Naujoji Vilnia organization.

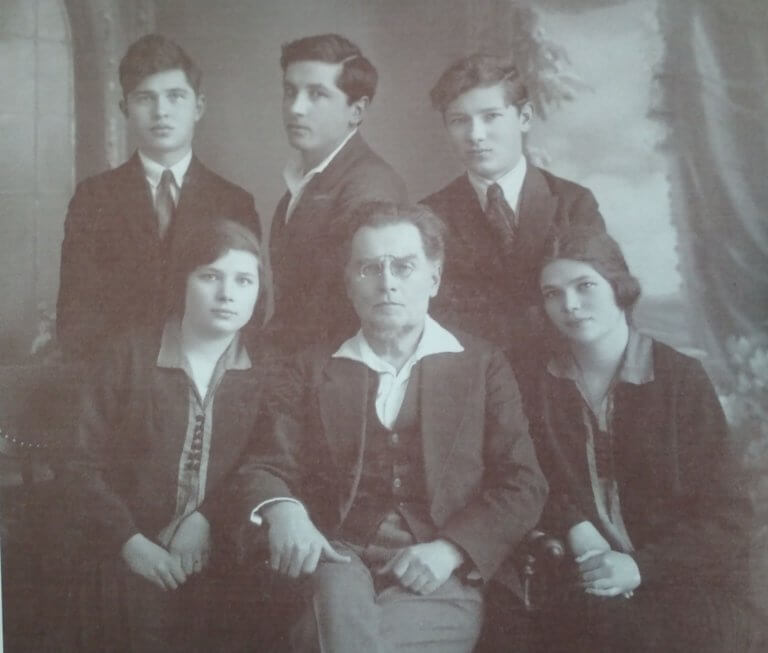
Domaševičius with his family in 1924

== Later years ==
Domaševičius' views closely aligned with those of the Bolshevik movement. In 1919, he founded his own Lithuanian Communist Party, made up of parts of the Social Democratic and Naujoji Vilnia movements, becoming its chairman. However the party never gained recognition by the Bolsheviks. In 1919, Domaševičius was named as the commissar for health in the Bolshevik-established government headed by Vincas Mickevičius-Kapsukas. A new department of obstetrics and women's diseases was established at the Saint James hospital in Vilnius under the efforts of Domaševičius. After Vilnius was occupied by the Polish Army, he was arrested twice and spent a year in Russia.

After returning from exile in 1920, he settled in Panevėžys in 1921. For a while, he headed the obstetrics-gynecology department at the county hospital and later, due to being forcefully removed from his position due to his ties with worker unions, engaged in private practice looking for ways to treat people free of charge and reduce maternal mortality. In Panevėžys, Domaševičius organized workers' trade unions and actively participated in workers' activities, and as such was often under surveillance. In 1923, he established a private clinic in his own home. From 1921 to 1924 he was the city council's consultant on public health.

He established the artist group Šviesa in 1924 and the Panevėžys branch of the General Workers' Union in 1925. After the 1926 Lithuanian coup d'état which brought the authoritarian regime of Antanas Smetona to power, Domaševičius was arrested for his support of the illegal Lithuanian Communist Party. He was attacked and heavily injured in the same year. In 1928, the military court acquitted him, but in 1933 Domaševičius was exiled to Smilgiai for half a year. In 1934, he returned to Panevėžys, where he founded the societies for the fight against rheumatism as well as for the fight against women's diseases in general.

Andrius Domaševičius died in Panevėžys on 19 March 1935.

== Bibliography ==
- Biržiška, Vaclovas, Andrius Domaševičius – Lietuvos socialdemokratų partijos kūrėjas, Kaunas, Šviesa, 1992, p. 219–220.
- Čaplinskas, Antanas Rimvydas, Vilniaus atminimo knyga: mieste įamžintos asmenybės, Vilnius, 2011, p. 101
- Čiplytė, Joana Viga, Daktaras Andrius Domaševičius (1865–1935): Lietuvos socialdemokratų partijai – 110 metų, Vilnius, 2006
- Domaševičius, Andrius, Atminties ženklai gydytojams, Vilnius, 2012, p. 37–38
- Domaševičius, Andrius, Visuotinė lietuvių enciklopedija, Vilnius, 2004, 5th Volume, p. 63.
- Grinius, Kazys, Dr. Andrius Domaševičius (1865–1935) [nekrologas], 1935, p. 2.
- Kairiūkštytė, Nastazija, Domaševičius Andrius: 1865 11 30–1935 03 19: gydytojas, visuomenės veikėjas, spaudos darbuotojas, Vilnius, 2009, p. 85–87.
- Krikštaponis, Vilmantas, Likęs ištikimas darbo žmogui: [Gydytojo, švietėjo, socialdemokratijos pradininko Lietuvoje, visuomenės veikėjo Andriaus Domaševičiaus 145-osioms gimimo metinėms], 2010, p. 34–37.
- Lebedytė, Ramūnė, Paslapčių gaubiama daktaro Domaševičiaus namo istorija, 1995, p. 9.
- Lietuvos TSR istorijos ir kultūros paminklų sąvadas, Vilnius, 1988, p. 125–126
- Maknys, Vytautas, Vilniaus lietuvių susivienijimas „Rūta“, Vilnius, 1972, p. 121
- Micelmacheris, Viktoras, Apie žymiausius 1918–1919 m.tarybinės sveikatos apsaugos veikėjus [Gydytojas Andrius Domaševičius – pirmasis tarybinės sveikatos apsaugos organiatorius Lietuvoje], Vilnius, 1959, p. 57–65.
- Valeika, Henrikas, Po revoliucinį Vilnių, Vilnius, 1981, p. 17.
- Venclova, Tomas, Andrius Domaševičius, Vilnius, R. Paknio leidykla, 2017. p. 205–206.
