= Sovetskaya Litva =

Russian-language newspaper, published in Latvia

- Language: Russian
- Country: Soviet Union
- ISSN: 0233-3643
- OCLC number: 22160697

Sovetskaya Litva (literally: Soviet Lithuania; Russian: Советская Литва) was a Russian-language daily newspaper published in the Lithuanian SSR. In tandem with the Lithuanian-language Tiesa, it was the official newspaper of the Communist Party of Lithuania, the Supreme Soviet of the Lithuanian SSR, and the Council of Ministers of the Lithuanian SSR. After the restoration of Lithuania's independence in 1990, the newspaper became an independent daily under the name Echo Litvy (literally: Echo of Lithuania; Russian: Эхо Литвы). Its circulation was 79,000 copies in 1981, 26,000 copies in 1993, and 12,000 copies in 1997. It discontinued publication in 2001 due to financial difficulties.

== History ==
On 10 July 1940, less than a month after the occupation of Lithuania by the Soviet Union, the newspaper was established as Truzhenik (Worker; Russian: Труженик) and was published in Kaunas. It was discontinued on 22 June 1941, the day of the German invasion of the Soviet Union. It was reestablished in Vilnius under the name Sovetskaya Litva on 26 September 1944. It was the official newspaper of the Communist Party of Lithuania, the Supreme Soviet of the Lithuanian SSR, and the Council of Ministers of the Lithuanian SSR.

On 23 February 1990, Sovetskaya Litva was separated from the Communist Party of Lithuania. When Lithuania regained its independence in March 1990, Sovetskaya Litva was renamed to Echo Litvy on 15 March and remained the official newspaper of the Lithuanian government until 1994. It represented the Supreme Council – Reconstituent Seimas and the Government of Lithuania in 1990–92, and the Seimas and the Government in 1992–94. As the official newspaper, Echo Litvy was obligated to publish adopted and proposed laws which hurt its popularity. The new name Echo Litvy mirrored the Lithuanian-language Lietuvos aidas and there were aborted plans of merging the two dailies. Echo Litvy was the cheapest newspaper in Lithuania.

These changes were not accepted by pro-Soviet activists who in March 1990 – August 1991 published alternative pro-Moscow Sovetskaya Litva and Lithuanian-language Tarybų Lietuva. After an order prohibiting the use of the historical name, this alternative newspaper was renamed to Litva Sovetskaya in June 1990. This newspaper was organized by Aleksandras Gelbachas, Vladas Bikuličius, and Žana Naumova. Initially, the newspapers were printed at a press of the Communist Party of Byelorussia in Minsk. After the main newspaper press at Press Palace was seized on 11 January 1991 (see January Events) and Russian specialists who could operate the press arrived in February, the newspapers were printed in Vilnius. The circulation was 15,800 copies in Russian and 22,000 in Lithuanian in 1990, and 40,000 in Russian and 17,600 in Lithuanian in 1991. In total, 131 issues appeared in Russian and 103 in Lithuanian.

Echo Litvy was privatized and became an independent publication. However, it retained its dry tone of an official newspaper and displayed nostalgic tendencies for the Soviet past. It suffered from shrinking readership and financial difficulties and failed to find a wealthy Russian sponsor. During its last year, the circulation was 2,000 copies and 46% of it remained unsold. It discontinued publication on 1 March 2001. The bankruptcy proceedings were started on 12 September 2001 and the company was officially liquidated in May 2003.

== Editors ==
The newspaper editors were:

- Vasilijus Dilmanas (1940–1941)
- Pavelas Gelbakas (1944–1945)
- A. Fedotovas (1945–1946)
- Aleksandras Anuškinas (1946–1953)
- Vasilijus Lucenka (1954–1955)
- Vasilijus Meščeriakovas (1955–1970)
- Vasilijus Jemeljanovas (1970–1998)

== See also ==
- Eastern Bloc information dissemination
