= List of heads of state of Lithuania =

The article is a list of heads of state of Lithuania over historical Lithuanian state. The timeline includes all heads of state of Lithuania as a sovereign entity, legitimately part of a greater sovereign entity, a client state, or a constituent republic subject to an outside authority. Currently, the head of state is the President of Lithuania.

During the inaugurations of Lithuanian monarchs until 1569, the Gediminas's Cap was placed on the monarch's heads by the Bishop of Vilnius in Vilnius Cathedral.

== Kingdom of Lithuania (1251–1263) ==
Title: King of Lithuania (Lithuanian: Lietuvos karalius). Dates are approximate because of scant written sources.

=== House of Mindaugas (1251–1263) ===
Name	Portrait	Birth	Marriage(s)	Death
Grand Duke/King; Mindaugas; 1236 – 17 July 1251 as Grand Duke 17 July 1251 – 12 September 1263 (crowned 1253) as King		c. 1203 Son of mythological Ringaudas	(1) NN; 2 children (2) Morta; 2 or 4 children (3) NN (sister of Morta)	1263; Aglona; Assassinated by Treniota and Daumantas; Aged about 60

== Grand Duchy of Lithuania (1263–1569) ==
Title: Grand Duke (Lithuanian: didysis kunigaikštis; Belarusian: vialiki kniaź; Polish: wielki książę). Dates are approximate because of scant written sources.

=== House of Mindaugas (1263–1267) ===
Name	Portrait	Birth	Marriage(s)	Death
Grand Duke; Treniota; 1263 – 1264		Unknown Son of NN, Mindaugas' sister and Vykintas	Unknown; 1 child	1264; Murdered by servants loyal to Mindaugas' son Vaišvilkas
Grand Duke; Vaišvilkas; 1264 – 1267		Unknown Son of Mindaugas and Morta	Unmarried and childless	1268; Was murdered by Leo I of Galicia

=== House of Monomakh (1267–1269) ===
Name	Portrait	Birth	Marriage(s)	Death
Grand Duke; Shvarn; Lithuanian: Švarnas; 1267 – 1269		c. 1230; Halych Son of Daniel of Galicia	NN, daughter of Mindaugas	c. 1269; Kholm; Aged about 39

=== House of Mindaugas (1269–1285) ===
Name	Portrait	Birth	Marriage(s)	Death
Grand Duke; Traidenis; 1270 – 1282		1220	Ona of Masovia; 1 child	1282; Kernavė; Aged 62
Grand Duke; Daumantas; 1282 – 1285		Unknown	Unknown	3 March 1285; Died in a battle by Tver

=== House of Gediminas (1285–1440) ===
Name	Portrait	Arms	Birth	Marriage(s)	Death
Grand Duke; Butigeidis; 1285 – 1291		None known	Unknown Son of Skalmantas (?)	Unknown	1291
Grand Duke; Butvydas; 1291 – 1295		None known	Unknown Son of Skalmantas (?)	Unknown	c. 1294–1295
Grand Duke; Vytenis; 1295 – 1316		None known	1260 Son of Butvydas	Vikinda; 1 child	1316; Aged 56
Grand Duke; Gediminas; 1316 – 1341		None known	c. 1275 Son of Butvydas	Jaunė; 13 children	c. 1341; Raudonė; Aged about 66
Grand Duke; Jaunutis; 1341 – 1345		None known	c. 1306−1309 Son of Gediminas and Jaunė	Unknown; 3 children	c. 1366; Aged 57−60
Grand Duke; Algirdas; 1345 – 1377			c. 1296 Son of Gediminas and Jaunė	(1) Maria of Vitebsk; 6 children (2) Uliana of Tver; 8 children	c. 1377; Maišiagala; Aged about 81
Grand Duke; Jogaila Algirdaitis; May 1377 – August 1381			c. 1352−1362; Vilnius Son of Algirdas and Uliana of Tver	(1) Jadwiga of Poland; 1 child (2) Anna of Cilli; 1 child (3) Elizabeth Granowska (4) Sophia of Halshany; 3 children	1 June 1434; Gródek Jagielloński; Aged 72−82
Grand Duke; Kęstutis probably 1345 – 1382 attested: 1349–1351 (as co-ruler with Algirdas), 1381–1382			c. 1297; Senieji Trakai Son of Gediminas and Jaunė	Birutė; 9 children	1382; Kreva; Died in captivity possibly murdered on Jogaila's order Aged 84–85
Grand Duke; Jogaila Algirdaitis; 3 August 1382 – 1 June 1434 (51 years, 302 days)			c. 1352−1362; Vilnius Son of Algirdas and Uliana of Tver	(1) Jadwiga of Poland; 1 child (2) Anna of Cilli; 1 child (3) Elizabeth Granowska (4) Sophia of Halshany; 3 children	1 June 1434; Gródek Jagielloński; Aged 72−82
Act of Kreva signed in 1385 Poland and Lithuania de jure are ruled by one monarch but remain to be separate states.
King of Poland and Grand Duke; Jogaila Algirdaitis; 3 August 1382 – 1 June 1434 (51 years, 302 days)			c. 1352−1362; Vilnius Son of Algirdas and Uliana of Tver	(1) Jadwiga of Poland; 1 child (2) Anna of Cilli; 1 child (3) Elizabeth Granowska (4) Sophia of Halshany; 3 children	1 June 1434; Gródek Jagielloński; Aged 72−82
Duke; Skirgaila; 1386 – 1392 (regent)			c. 1353–1354; Vilnius Son of Algirdas and Uliana of Tver	Unknown; 1 child	11 January 1397; Kyiv; Possibly poisoned by the order of the Russian Orthodox priests Aged 43−44
Astrava Agreement signed in 1392 and Pact of Vilnius and Radom in 1401 Following the Lithuanian Civil War, Skirgaila is replaced by Vytautas. The latter de jure acts as regent for the King of Poland until 1401, when he is formally recognized as the Grand Duke. His successors rule as Grand Dukes alongside Polish monarchs until 1440.
Grand Duke; King-elect of Lithuania; Vytautas; Vytautas the Great; 4 August 1392 – 1401 (regent); 1401 – 27 October 1430 (Grand Duke) (in total: 38 years, 84 days)			c. 1350; Senieji Trakai Son of Kęstutis and Birutė	(1) Anna; 1 child (2) Uliana Olshanska	27 October 1430; Trakai; Aged about 80
Grand Duke; Švitrigaila; October 1430 – 1 August 1432			Before 1370; Vilnius Son of Algirdas and Uliana of Tver	Anna of Tver; 1 child	10 February 1452; Lutsk; Aged about 82
Grand Duke; Sigismund Kęstutaitis; Lithuanian: Žygimantas Kęstutaitis; 1432 – 1440			1365; Trakai Son of Kęstutis and Birutė	Unknown; 1 child	20 March 1440; Trakai; Murdered by supporters of Švitrigaila; Aged 75

=== House of Jagiellon (1440–1569) ===
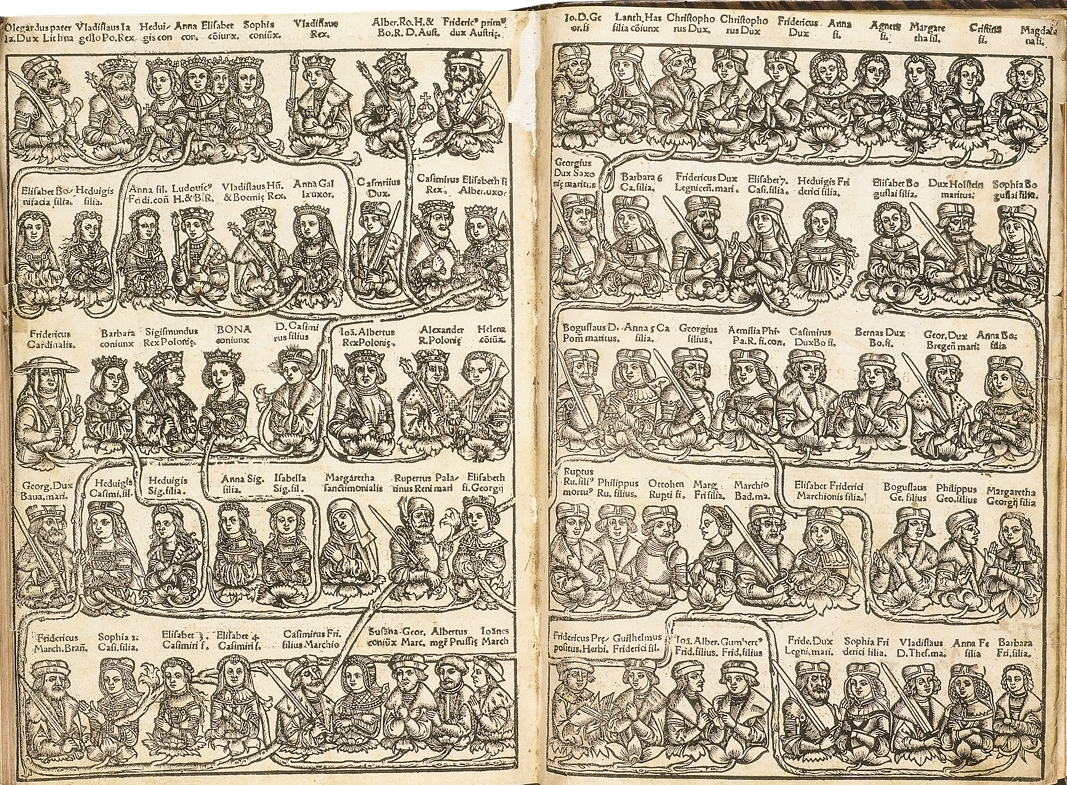
The Gediminids-Jagiellonians ruled medieval Lithuania.

The act of personal union with Poland was signed as early as 1385; however, the continuous line of common rulers of the two countries started only with Casimir IV (even then, Polish and Lithuanians twice selected different rulers following the death of an earlier common monarch, but the Lithuanian one always eventually assumed the Polish throne). The monarchs retained separate titles for both parts of the state, and their numbering was kept separate. The Jagiellon dynasty was a direct continuation of the Gediminids.

Name	Portrait	Arms	Birth	Marriage(s)	Death
King of Poland and Grand Duke; Władysław; Lithuanian: Vladislovas; 1 June 1434 – 10 November 1444 (10 years, 162 days)	-		31 October 1424; Kraków Son of Jogaila Algirdaitis and Sophia of Halshany	Unmarried and childless	10 November 1444; Varna; Aged 20 (presumed)
King of Poland and Grand Duke; Casmimir Andrew; Lithuanian: Kazimieras Jogailaitis; 29 June 1440 – 7 June 1492 (51 years, 344 days)			30 November 1427; Kraków Son of Jogaila Algirdaitis and Sophia of Halshany	Elisabeth of Austria; 13 children	7 June 1492; Old Grodno Castle; Aged 64
King of Poland and Grand Duke; John I Albert; Lithuanian: Jonas Albrechtas (disputed); Summer 1492 – 17 June 1501 (~ 7 years, 10 months)			27 December 1459; Kraków Son of Kazimieras Jogailaitis and Elisabeth of Austria	Unmarried and childless	17 June 1501; Toruń; Aged 41
King of Poland and Grand Duke; Alexander Jagiellon; Lithuanian: Aleksandras Jogailaitis; 30 July 1492 – 19 August 1506 (14 years, 20 days)			5 August 1461; Kraków Son of Kazimieras Jogailaitis and Elisabeth of Austria	Helena of Moscow	19 August 1506; Vilnius; Aged 45
King of Poland and Grand Duke; Sigismund the Old; Lithuanian: Žygimantas Senasis; 20 October 1506 – 1 April 1548 (41 years, 164 days)			1 January 1467; Kozienice Son of Kazimieras Jogailaitis and Elisabeth of Austria	(1) Barbara Zápolya; 2 children (2) Bona Sforza; 6 children	1 April 1548; Kraków; Aged 81
King of Poland and Grand Duke; Sigismund Augustus; Lithuanian: Žygimantas Augustas; 18 October 1529 – 7 July 1572 (42 years, 263 days)			1 August 1520; Kraków Son of Žygimantas the Old and Bona Sforza	(1) Elisabeth of Austria (2) Barbara Radziwiłł (3) Catherine of Austria	7 July 1572; Knyszyn; Aged 51
Union of Lublin signed in 1569 Poland and Lithuania are united into a single Commonwealth.

== Polish–Lithuanian Commonwealth (1569–1795) ==
The Polish–Lithuanian Commonwealth was established by the Union of Lublin in 1569. The elected King of Poland was automatically a Grand Duke of Lithuania (until then the Lithuanian dukedom was hereditary). The first common ruler of both countries was Sigismund II Augustus.

During the Deluge of the Second Northern War, Lithuania signed the Union of Kėdainiai with the Swedish Empire in 1655, thus de jure ending its union with Poland. However, due to Sweden's losses, the agreement soon fell out of favor and was not properly enforced, leading to the further continuation of the Polish–Lithuanian Commonwealth. Following the partitions in 1772, 1793, and 1795, the commonwealth ceased to exist and Lithuania proper became part of the Russian Empire for 123 years. There are some gaps in the timeline as it took a while to elect a new king. The first Grand Duke elected after the Gediminid line became extinct and after the Valois fled back to France was Stephen Báthory, who had made an effort to be recognized as Grand Duke of Lithuania by establishing Vilnius University.

Title: King of Poland and Grand Duke of Lithuania

Lithuanian: Lenkijos karalius ir Lietuvos didysis kunigaikštis

Polish: Król Polski, wielki książę litewski

Latin: Rex Poloniae et Magnus Dux Lituaniae

Name	Portrait	Arms	Birth	Marriage(s)	Death	Claim	House
King of Poland and Grand Duke; Sigismund Augustus; Lithuanian: Žygimantas Augustas 1 July 1569 – 7 July 1572 (42 years, 264 days)			1 August 1520; Kraków Son of Žygimantas the Old and Bona Sforza	(3) Elisabeth of Austria; Barbara Radziwiłł; Catherine of Austria	7 July 1572; Knyszyn; Aged 51	Hereditary First monarch to introduce elective monarchy	Jagiellon
King of Poland and Grand Duke; Henry; Lithuanian: Henrikas Valua; 16 May 1573 – 12 May 1575 (1 year, 362 days)			19 September 1551; Fontainebleau Son of Henry II and Catherine de' Medici	(1) Louise of Lorraine	2 August 1589; Saint-Cloud; Aged 37	Elected Left Poland in June 1574 to succeed his brother in France Interregnum until 1575	Valois
Queen of Poland and Grand Duchess; Anna; Lithuanian: Ona Jogailaitė; 15 December 1575 – 19 August 1587 (de facto) (11 years, 248 days) – 9 September 1596 (de jure) (20 years, 270 days)			18 October 1523; Kraków Daughter of Sigismund I and Bona Sforza	(1) Stephen Báthory	9 September 1596; Warsaw; Aged 72	Elected co-monarch with Stephen Báthory Sole ruler until Báthory's arrival and coronation in May 1576 Ruled after husband's death until her nephew was elected	Jagiellon
King of Poland and Grand Duke; Stephen Báthory; Lithuanian: Steponas Batoras; 1 May 1576 – 12 December 1586 (10 years, 226 days)			27 September 1533; Szilágysomlyó (Șimleu Silvaniei) Son of Stephen Báthory of Somlyó and Catherine Telegdi	(1) Anna Jagiellon	12 December 1586; Grodno; Aged 53	Elected as co-monarch with Anna Jagiellon Previously Prince of Transylvania	Báthory
King of Poland and Grand Duke; Sigismund Vasa; Lithuanian: Zigmantas Vaza; 19 August 1587 – 30 April 1632 (44 years, 256 days)			20 June 1566; Gripsholm Son of John III of Sweden and Catherine Jagiellon	(1) Anne of Austria; 5 children (2) Constance of Austria; 7 children	30 April 1632; Warsaw; Aged 65	Elected, nephew of Anna Jagiellon Transferred capital from Kraków to Warsaw Hereditary King of Sweden until deposition in 1599	Vasa
King of Poland and Grand Duke; Władysław also Ladislaus; Lithuanian: Vladislovas Vaza; 8 November 1632 – 20 May 1648 (15 years, 195 days)			9 June 1595; Łobzów Son of Sigismund Vasa and Anne of Austria	(1) Cecilia Renata of Austria; 3 children (2) Marie Louise Gonzaga	20 May 1648; Merkinė; Aged 52	Elective succession Also titular King of Sweden and elected Tsar of Russia (1610–1613) when the Polish army captured Moscow	Vasa
King of Poland and Grand Duke; John Casimir; Lithuanian: Jonas Kazimieras Vaza; 20 November 1648 – 16 September 1668 (19 years, 302 days)			22 March 1609; Kraków Son of Sigismund vasa and Constance of Austria	(1) Marie Louise Gonzaga; 2 children (2) Claudine Françoise Mignot (allegedly); 1 child?	16 December 1672; Nevers; Aged 63	Elective succession, succeeded half-brother Previously a cardinal Disputed with Charles X Gustav between 1655–1657 Titular King of Sweden Abdicated	Vasa
King of Poland and Grand Duke; Michael; Lithuanian: Mykolas Kaributas Višnioveckis; 19 June 1669 – 10 November 1673 (4 years, 145 days)			31 May 1640; Biały Kamień Son of Jeremi Wiśniowiecki and Gryzelda Konstancja Zamoyska	(1) Eleonora Maria of Austria; 1 child	10 November 1673; Lwów; Aged 33	Elected Born into nobility of mixed heritage, the son of a military commander and governor	Wiśniowiecki
King of Poland and Grand Duke; John III Sobieski; Lithuanian: Jonas Sobieskis; 19 May 1674 – 17 June 1696 (22 years, 30 days)			17 August 1629; Olesko Son of Jakub Sobieski and Teofila Zofia	(1) Marie Casimire d'Arquien; 13 children	17 June 1696; Wilanów; Aged 66	Elected Born into nobility A successful military commander	Sobieski
King of Poland and Grand Duke; Augustus II; Lithuanian: Augustas II Stiprusis; 15 September 1697 – 1706 (1st reign, 9 years)			12 May 1670; Dresden Son of John George III and Princess Anna Sophie of Denmark	(1) Christiane Eberhardine of Brandenburg-Bayreuth; 1 child	1 February 1733; Warsaw; Aged 62	Elected Previously Elector and ruler of Saxony Dethroned by Stanislaus I in 1706 during the Great Northern War	Wettin
King of Poland and Grand Duke; Stanislaus I Lithuanian: Stanislovas I Leščinskis; 12 July 1704 – 8 July 1709 (1st reign, 4 years, 362 days)			20 October 1677; Lwów Son of Rafał Leszczyński and Anna Jabłonowska	(1) Catherine Opalińska; 2 children	23 February 1766; Lunéville; Aged 88	Usurped Nominated as ruler in 1704, crowned in 1705 and deposed predecessor in 1706 Exiled in 1709	Leszczyński
King of Poland and Grand Duke; Augustus II; Lithuanian: Augustas II Stiprusis; 8 July 1709 – 1 February 1733 (2nd reign, 23 years, 209 days)			12 May 1670; Dresden Son of John George III and Princess Anna Sophie of Denmark	(1) Christiane Eberhardine of Brandenburg-Bayreuth; 1 child	1 February 1733; Warsaw; Aged 62	Restored	Wettin
King of Poland and Grand Duke; Stanislaus I Lithuanian: Stanislovas I Leščinskis; 12 September 1733 – 26 January 1736 (2nd reign, 2 years, 137 days)			20 October 1677; Lwów Son of Rafał Leszczyński and Anna Jabłonowska	(1) Catherine Opalińska; 2 children	23 February 1766; Lunéville; Aged 88	Elected His election sparked the War of the Polish Succession Deposed by Augustus III in 1736	Leszczyński
King of Poland and Grand Duke; Augustus III; Lithuanian: Augustas III Saksas; 5 October 1733 – 5 October 1763 (30 years)			17 October 1696; Dresden Son of Augustus II the Strong and Christiane Eberhardine	(1) Maria Josepha of Austria; 16 children	5 October 1763; Dresden; Aged 66	Usurped Proclaimed King of Poland in 1733, crowned in 1734 Dethroned elected predecessor in 1736	Wettin
King of Poland and Grand Duke; Stanislaus II Augustus; Lithuanian: Stanislovas Augustas II Poniatovskis; 7 September 1764 – 25 November 1795 (31 years, 80 days)			17 January 1732; Wołczyn Son of Stanisław Poniatowski and Konstancja Czartoryska	Officially unmarried; (1) Elżbieta Szydłowska (allegedly) presumably several unacknowledged children	1 February 1798; Saint Petersburg; Aged 66	Elected Born into nobility Last King of Poland and Grand Duke of Lithuania, his reign ended in the Partitions of Poland	Poniatowski

== Kingdom of Lithuania (1918) ==
The Council of Lithuania declared independence on 16 February 1918 and invited Wilhelm of Urach to become king of Lithuania. The name of the state was the Kingdom of Lithuania. On 9 July 1918, Duke Wilhelm accepted the offer and took the name Mindaugas II. However, on 2 November the council revoked this decision as it was likely Germany would lose the war.

=== House of Urach (1918) ===
Name	Portrait	Arms	Birth	Marriage(s)	Death
King; Mindaugas II; 11 July 1918 – 2 November 1918 (115 days)			30 May 1864 Son of Wilhelm, 1st Duke of Urach and Princess Florestine of Monaco	Duchess Amalie in Bavaria; Princess Wiltrud of Bavaria	24 March 1928

== Republic of Lithuania (1918–1940) ==
=== Presidents of the Presidium of the Council of Lithuania ===
The state of Lithuania was ruled by the Presidium of the State Council of Lithuania, its chairman was de facto Head of State. The institution of President was established on 4 April 1919. Chairman of the Presidium Antanas Smetona was elected as First President of the State of Lithuania by the State Council of Lithuania and was the only one in under whose rule this position has been considered the office of the head of state.

Portrait	Name (Birth–Death)	No.	Took Office	Left Office	Time in office	Party	Election	Prime Minister
			Term of office					
	Antanas Smetona (1874–1944)	1	2 November 1918	4 April 1919	153 days	Party of National Progress	1917 By the Council	Position officially established on November 11, 1918
	Antanas Smetona (1874–1944)	1	2 November 1918	4 April 1919	153 days	Party of National Progress	1917 By the Council	Augustinas Voldemaras
	Antanas Smetona (1874–1944)	1	2 November 1918	4 April 1919	153 days	Party of National Progress	1917 By the Council	Mykolas Sleževičius
	Antanas Smetona (1874–1944)	1	2 November 1918	4 April 1919	153 days	Party of National Progress	1917 By the Council	Pranas Dovydaitis

=== Presidents of the Republic of Lithuania ===
The institution of President (Lithuanian: Prezidentas) was created on 4 April 1919. Antanas Smetona was elected as the first President of Lithuania.

No.	Portrait	Name (Birth–Death)	Term	Party	Election	Prime Minister
1		Antanas Smetona (1874–1944)	4 April 1919 – 19 June 1920	Party of National Progress	4 April 1919 By the Council	Pranas Dovydaitis
1		Antanas Smetona (1874–1944)	4 April 1919 – 19 June 1920	Party of National Progress	4 April 1919 By the Council	Mykolas Sleževičius
1		Aleksandras Stulginskis (1885–1969); Acting	19 June 1920 – 21 December 1922	Lithuanian Christian Democratic Party	Acting President as Chairman of the Constituent Assembly of Lithuania	Mykolas Sleževičius
–		Aleksandras Stulginskis (1885–1969); Acting	19 June 1920 – 21 December 1922	Lithuanian Christian Democratic Party	Acting President as Chairman of the Constituent Assembly of Lithuania	Mykolas Sleževičius
–		Aleksandras Stulginskis (1885–1969); Acting	19 June 1920 – 21 December 1922	Lithuanian Christian Democratic Party	Acting President as Chairman of the Constituent Assembly of Lithuania	Ernestas Galvanauskas
–		Aleksandras Stulginskis (1885–1969); Acting	19 June 1920 – 21 December 1922	Lithuanian Christian Democratic Party	Acting President as Chairman of the Constituent Assembly of Lithuania	Kazys Grinius
–		Aleksandras Stulginskis (1885–1969)	21 December 1922 – 7 June 1926	Lithuanian Christian Democratic Party	21 December 1922 By the Seimas	Kazys Grinius
2		Aleksandras Stulginskis (1885–1969)	21 December 1922 – 7 June 1926	Lithuanian Christian Democratic Party	21 December 1922 By the Seimas	Kazys Grinius
2		Aleksandras Stulginskis (1885–1969)	21 December 1922 – 7 June 1926	Lithuanian Christian Democratic Party	21 December 1922 By the Seimas	Ernestas Galvanauskas
2		Aleksandras Stulginskis (1885–1969)	21 December 1922 – 7 June 1926	Lithuanian Christian Democratic Party	21 December 1922 By the Seimas	Antanas Tumėnas
2		Aleksandras Stulginskis (1885–1969)	21 December 1922 – 7 June 1926	Lithuanian Christian Democratic Party	21 December 1922 By the Seimas	Vytautas Petrulis
2		Aleksandras Stulginskis (1885–1969)	21 December 1922 – 7 June 1926	Lithuanian Christian Democratic Party	21 December 1922 By the Seimas	Leonas Bistras
2		Kazys Grinius (1866–1950)	7 June 1926 – 18 December 1926	Lithuanian Popular Peasants' Union	7 June 1926 By the Seimas	Leonas Bistras
3		Kazys Grinius (1866–1950)	7 June 1926 – 18 December 1926	Lithuanian Popular Peasants' Union	7 June 1926 By the Seimas	Leonas Bistras
3		Kazys Grinius (1866–1950)	7 June 1926 – 18 December 1926	Lithuanian Popular Peasants' Union	7 June 1926 By the Seimas	Mykolas Sleževičius
3		Kazys Grinius (1866–1950)	7 June 1926 – 18 December 1926	Lithuanian Popular Peasants' Union	7 June 1926 By the Seimas	Augustinas Voldemaras
1926 Lithuanian coup d'état
–		Jonas Staugaitis (1866–1950); Acting	18 December 1926 – 19 December 1926	Lithuanian Popular Peasants' Union	Unelected — acting President following coup d'état	Augustinas Voldemaras
–		Aleksandras Stulginskis (1885–1969); Acting	19 December 1926	Lithuanian Christian Democratic Party	Unelected — acting President following coup d'état	Augustinas Voldemaras
–		Antanas Smetona (1874–1944)	19 December 1926 – 15 June 1940	Lithuanian Nationalist Union	19 December 1926 In illegitimate elections	Augustinas Voldemaras
1		Antanas Smetona (1874–1944)	19 December 1926 – 15 June 1940	Lithuanian Nationalist Union	19 December 1926 In illegitimate elections	Augustinas Voldemaras
1		Antanas Smetona (1874–1944)	19 December 1926 – 15 June 1940	Lithuanian Nationalist Union	19 December 1926 In illegitimate elections	Juozas Tūbelis
1		Antanas Smetona (1874–1944)	19 December 1926 – 15 June 1940	Lithuanian Nationalist Union	19 December 1926 In illegitimate elections	Juozas Tūbelis
1		Antanas Smetona (1874–1944)	19 December 1926 – 15 June 1940	Lithuanian Nationalist Union	19 December 1926 In illegitimate elections	Juozas Tūbelis
1		Antanas Smetona (1874–1944)	19 December 1926 – 15 June 1940	Lithuanian Nationalist Union	11 December 1931 In illegitimate elections	Juozas Tūbelis
1		Antanas Smetona (1874–1944)	19 December 1926 – 15 June 1940	Lithuanian Nationalist Union	11 December 1931 In illegitimate elections	Vladas Mironas
1		Antanas Smetona (1874–1944)	19 December 1926 – 15 June 1940	Lithuanian Nationalist Union	14 October 1938 In illegitimate elections	Vladas Mironas
1		Antanas Smetona (1874–1944)	19 December 1926 – 15 June 1940	Lithuanian Nationalist Union	14 October 1938 In illegitimate elections	Vladas Mironas
1		Antanas Smetona (1874–1944)	19 December 1926 – 15 June 1940	Lithuanian Nationalist Union	14 October 1938 In illegitimate elections	Jonas Černius
1		Antanas Smetona (1874–1944)	19 December 1926 – 15 June 1940	Lithuanian Nationalist Union	14 October 1938 In illegitimate elections	Antanas Merkys
15 June 1940 — 1st Soviet occupation of Lithuania
–		Antanas Merkys (1877–1955); Acting	15 June 1940 – 17 June 1940	Lithuanian Nationalist Union	Unelected — de jure acting President	Antanas Merkys
–		Justas Paleckis (1899–1980); Acting	17 June 1940 – 15 August 1940	Communist Party of Lithuania	Unelected — nominal acting President placed by the Soviet leadership	Justas Paleckis; Acting
–		Justas Paleckis (1899–1980); Acting	17 June 1940 – 15 August 1940	Communist Party of Lithuania	Unelected — nominal acting President placed by the Soviet leadership	Position officially abolished on June 24, 1940

=== Posthumously recognized acting Presidents ===
No.	Portrait	Name (Birth–Death)	In office	Cause of death	Date of recognition
–		General; Jonas Žemaitis (1909–1954); Acting	16 February 1949 – 26 November 1954	In 1954, executed by shooting in Butyrka prison, Moscow, Russian SFSR.	March, 2009 By the Seimas
–		Colonel; Adolfas Ramanauskas (1918–1957); Acting	26 November 1954 – 29 November 1957	In 1957, executed by shooting in Vilnius, Lithuanian SSR.	November, 2018 By the Seimas

=== Heads of the Lithuanian Diplomatic Service ===
Following Lithuania's occupation by the Soviet Union on 15 June 1940, in his telegram dated 31 May 1940, the last Foreign Minister Juozas Urbšys provisioned that, in the event of occupation, Stasys Lozoraitis, minister extraordinary and plenipotentiary to Rome, be appointed the head of the Lithuanian diplomatic service. The Lithuanian diplomatic service became a Government in exile that was a critical piece to ensuring the recognition of the continuity of Lithuanian legal statehood until independence after the Dissolution of the Soviet Union.

No.	Image	Name	Term	Notes
1		Stasys Lozoraitis	15 June 1940 – 24 December 1983	Assumed office after the Soviet invasion of Lithuania in 1940.
2		Stasys Bačkis	24 December 1983 – 15 November 1987	Assumed office after the death of Stasys Lozoraitis in 1983.
–		Stasys Lozoraitis Jr.	15 November 1987 – 6 September 1991	Became de facto Head of the Diplomat Service after Stasys Bačkis left Washington, D.C. in 1988.

== Lithuanian Soviet Socialist Republic (1940–1941) ==
The Soviet Union occupied Lithuania and established the Lithuanian SSR in July 1940.

=== First Secretaries of the Central Committee of the Communist Party of Lithuania ===
Lithuanian: Lietuvos komunistų partijos Centro komiteto pirmasis sekretorius; Russian: Первый секретарь Центрального Комитета Коммунистической партии Литвы.

No.	Portrait	Name (Birth–Death)	In office	Party	Chairman of the Presidium of the Supreme Soviet	General Secretary of the CPSU
1		Antanas Sniečkus (1903–1974)	21 July 1940 – 24 June 1941	Communist Party of Lithuania	Justas Paleckis (1899–1980)	Joseph Stalin
22 June 1941 — Nazi occupation of Lithuania

== Generalbezirk Litauen (1941–1944) ==
As Nazi Germany attacked the Soviet Union in Operation Barbarossa, Lithuania liberated itself with the anti-Soviet June Uprising and re-declared Lithuanian Independence. Lithuania was ruled for some time by the Provisional Government of Lithuania, whose prime minister was Juozas Ambrazevičius. The Provisional Government was formed on 23 June 1941, but was dissolved on 5 August of the same year.

Lithuania was occupied by the Germans, who formed Generalbezirk Litauen on 25 July 1941, which was governed by the administration of general commissioner Theodor Adrian von Renteln and was a part of Reichskommissariat Ostland.

=== General Commissioners of Generalbezirk Litauen ===
Lithuanian: Lietuvos generalinės srities generalinis komisaras; German: Generalkommissar des Generalbezirks Litauen.

No.	Portrait	Name (Birth–Death)	In office	Party	General Counselor	Reichskommissar of the Ostland
1		Theodor Adrian von Renteln (1897–1960)	August 1941 – August 1944	Nazi Party	General; Petras Kubiliūnas (1894–1946)	Hinrich Lohse
1944 — 2nd Soviet occupation of Lithuania

== Lithuanian Soviet Socialist Republic (1944–1990) ==
As Nazi Germany retreated, the Soviet Union reoccupied the country and reestablished the Lithuanian SSR in 1944. The Presidium of the Supreme Soviet de jure acted as a collective head of state from 25 August 1940 to 11 March 1990. However, the Supreme Soviet de facto was controlled by the Communist Party of Lithuania led by the First Secretary.

=== First Secretaries of the Central Committee of the Communist Party of Lithuania ===
No.	Portrait	Name (Birth–Death)	In office	Party	Chairman of the Presidium of the Supreme Soviet	General Secretary of the CPSU
1		Antanas Sniečkus (1903–1974)	13 July 1944 – 22 January 1974	Communist Party of Lithuania	Justas Paleckis (1899–1980)	Joseph Stalin
1		Antanas Sniečkus (1903–1974)	13 July 1944 – 22 January 1974	Communist Party of Lithuania	Justas Paleckis (1899–1980)	Nikita Khruschev
1		Antanas Sniečkus (1903–1974)	13 July 1944 – 22 January 1974	Communist Party of Lithuania	Justas Paleckis (1899–1980)	Leonid Brezhnev
1		Antanas Sniečkus (1903–1974)	13 July 1944 – 22 January 1974	Communist Party of Lithuania	Motiejus Šumauskas (1905–1982)	Leonid Brezhnev
–		Valery Khazarov (1918–2013) Acting	22 January 1974 – 18 February 1974	Communist Party of Lithuania	Motiejus Šumauskas (1905–1982)	Leonid Brezhnev
–		Petras Griškevičius (1924–1987)	18 February 1974 – 14 November 1987	Communist Party of Lithuania	Motiejus Šumauskas (1905–1982)	Leonid Brezhnev
2		Petras Griškevičius (1924–1987)	18 February 1974 – 14 November 1987	Communist Party of Lithuania	Motiejus Šumauskas (1905–1982)	Leonid Brezhnev
2		Petras Griškevičius (1924–1987)	18 February 1974 – 14 November 1987	Communist Party of Lithuania	Antanas Barkauskas (1899–1980)	Leonid Brezhnev
2		Petras Griškevičius (1924–1987)	18 February 1974 – 14 November 1987	Communist Party of Lithuania	Antanas Barkauskas (1899–1980)	Yuri Andropov
2		Petras Griškevičius (1924–1987)	18 February 1974 – 14 November 1987	Communist Party of Lithuania	Antanas Barkauskas (1899–1980)	Konstantin Chernenko
2		Petras Griškevičius (1924–1987)	18 February 1974 – 14 November 1987	Communist Party of Lithuania	Antanas Barkauskas (1899–1980)	Mikhail Gorbachev
2		Nikolay Mitkin (1929–1998) Acting	14 November 1987 – 1 December 1987	Communist Party of Lithuania	Antanas Barkauskas (1899–1980)	Mikhail Gorbachev
–		Nikolay Mitkin (1929–1998) Acting	14 November 1987 – 1 December 1987	Communist Party of Lithuania	Antanas Barkauskas (1899–1980)	Mikhail Gorbachev
–		Nikolay Mitkin (1929–1998) Acting	14 November 1987 – 1 December 1987	Communist Party of Lithuania	Ringaudas Songaila (1929–2019)	Mikhail Gorbachev
3		Ringaudas Songaila (1929–2019)	1 December 1987 – 19 October 1988	Communist Party of Lithuania	Vytautas Astrauskas (1930–2017)	Mikhail Gorbachev
3		Algirdas Brazauskas (1932–2010)	19 October 1988 – 11 March 1990	Communist Party of Lithuania	Vytautas Astrauskas (1930–2017)	Mikhail Gorbachev
4		Algirdas Brazauskas (1932–2010)	19 October 1988 – 11 March 1990	Communist Party of Lithuania	Vytautas Astrauskas (1930–2017)	Mikhail Gorbachev
4		Algirdas Brazauskas (1932–2010)	19 October 1988 – 11 March 1990	Communist Party of Lithuania	Algirdas Brazauskas (1932–2010)	Mikhail Gorbachev
7 December 1989 — "Leading role" of the Communist Party removed from the constitution
11 March 1990 — Restoration of Independence

== Republic of Lithuania (1990–present) ==
The leader of the Supreme Council was the official head of state from the declaration of independence on 11 March 1990 until the new Constitution came into effect in 1992 establishing the office of President and the institution of Seimas. The state and its leadership were not recognized internationally until September 1991 [NB: Iceland was the first country to recognise the regained independence of Lithuania in February 1991. Title from 1990 to 1992: Chairman of the Supreme Council (Parliament; Lithuanian: Aukščiausiosios Tarybos pirmininkas). Title from 1992 onwards: President (Lithuanian: prezidentas).

No	Portrait	Name (Birth–Death)	Elected	Took office	Left office	Political party	Affiliation/Notes
–		Vytautas Landsbergis (born 1932)	–	11 March 1990	25 November 1992	Sąjūdis	As Chairman of the Supreme Council.
Speaker of the Seimas Algirdas Brazauskas served as acting President from 25 November 1992 to 25 February 1993.
1		Algirdas Brazauskas (1932–2010)	1993	25 February 1993	25 February 1998	Democratic Labour Party of Lithuania	First president of the Republic of Lithuania
2		Valdas Adamkus (born 1926)	1997–98	26 February 1998	26 February 2003	Independent	
3		Rolandas Paksas (born 1956)	2002–03	26 February 2003	6 April 2004	Order and Justice	Impeached and removed from office.
Speaker of the Seimas Artūras Paulauskas served as acting President from 6 April to 12 July 2004.
(2)		Valdas Adamkus (born 1926)	2004	12 July 2004	12 July 2009	Independent	
4		Dalia Grybauskaitė (born 1956)	2009; 2014	12 July 2009	12 July 2019	Independent	First female President of Lithuania. Became the first President to be reelected.
5		Gitanas Nausėda (born 1964)	2019; 2024	12 July 2019	Incumbent	Independent	

== See also ==
- List of Lithuanian monarchs
- List of Lithuanian consorts
- List of early Lithuanian dukes
