= Ostrowski =

Ostrowski (Polish pronunciation: [ɔsˈtrɔfskʲi]; feminine: Ostrowska) is a Polish surname. It is a toponymic surname derived from any of places named Ostrów, Ostrowo, Ostrowsko It is related to several surnames in other languages.

== Related surnames ==
Language	Masculine	Feminine
Polish	Ostrowski	Ostrowska
Belarusian (Romanization)	Астроўскі (Astroŭski, Astrowski)	Астроўская (Astrouskaya, Astrouskaia, Astroŭskaja)
Bulgarian	Островски (Ostrovski)	Островска (Ostrovska)
Czech/Slovak	Ostrovský	Ostrovská
Latvian	Ostrovskis	
Lithuanian	Astrauskas, Ostrauskas	Astrauskienė (married); Astrauskaitė (unmarried)
Romanian/Moldovan	Ostrovschi, Ostrovschii	
Russian (Romanization)	Островский (Ostrovskiy, Ostrovskii, Ostrovsky, Ostrovskij)	Островская (Ostrovskaya, Ostrovskaia, Ostrovskaja)
Ukrainian (Romanization)	Островський (Ostrovskyi, Ostrovskyy, Ostrovsky, Ostrovskyj)	Островська (Ostrovska)
Variants	Ostrowsky, Ostrofsky, Ostrofski, Ostroski	

== People ==
- Adam Ostrowski (born 1980), Polish rapper better known as O.S.T.R.
- Aleksander Ostrowski (1988–2015), Polish extreme skier and mountaineer
- Alexander Ostrowski (1893–1986), German-Swiss mathematician
- Antoni Jan Ostrowski (1782–1845), Polish nobleman and military figure
- Cezary Ostrowski (born 1962), Polish composer
- Chet Ostrowski (1930–2001), American football player
- David Ostrowski (born 1981), German painter
- Frank Ostrowski (1960–2011), German programmer
- Ilona Ostrowska (born 1974), Polish actress
- Jadwiga Ostrowska-Czubenko (born 1949), Polish chemist
- Jan Ostrowski (born 1999), Luxembourgian footballer
- Krzysztof Ostrowski (born 1982), Polish footballer
- Małgorzata Ostrowska (born 1958), Polish politician
- Marek Ostrowski (1959–2017), Polish footballer
- Norbert Ostrowski (1938–2018), American automotive designer
- Otto Ostrowski (1883–1963), German politician
- Phil Ostrowski (born 1975), American football player
- Radasłaŭ Astroŭski (1887–1976), Belarusian political activist
- Ryszard Ostrowski (born 1961), Polish middle-distance runner
- Stéphane Ostrowski (born 1962), French basketball player
- Tomasz Adam Ostrowski (1735–1817), Polish nobleman
- Władysław Ostrowski (1790–1869), Polish politician
- Zdzisław Ostrowski (1933–2019), Polish brigadier general of te see Northern Group of Forces

== See also ==
- Ostrovsky (disambiguation)
