= Astrauskas =

- Lithuanian surname
- m.: Astrauskas
- f.: (unmarried): Astrauskaitė
- f.: (married): Astrauskienė

Astrauskas is a Lithuanian language family name. It corresponds to Polish Ostrowski, Russian Ostrovsky, and Belarusian Astrouski.

The surname may refer to:

- Nerijus Astrauskas (born 1980), Lithuanian football striker
- Rimantas Astrauskas (born 1955), Lithuanian physicist, ecologist and politician
- Vytautas Astrauskas (30 September 1930 – 7 August 2017) was a communist politician in the Lithuanian SSR
- Vytautas Astrauskas (physician) (23 March 1927 – 26 August 2004) was a Lithuanian physician, medical researcher, politician and former member of the Seimas.
