= Anatolii Goldberg =

Soviet and Israeli mathematician

Anatolii Asirovich Goldberg
- Анатолий Асирович Гольдберг
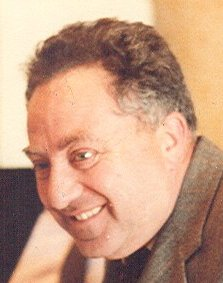
- A. A. Goldberg in Leningrad, 1982 (photo by D. Drasin)
- Born: April 2, 1930; Kyiv, Ukraine SSR, Soviet Union
- Died: October 11, 2008 (aged 78); Netanya, Israel
- Education: Lviv University
- Known for: Entire and meromorphic functions, Goldberg's examples, Goldberg's constants, Goldberg's conjecture
- Awards: State Prize of Ukraine (1992)
- Scientific career
- Fields: Mathematics
- Workplaces: Uzhhorod National University, Lviv University, Bar Ilan University
- Doctoral advisor: Lev Volkovyski

Anatolii Asirovich Goldberg (Russian: Анатолий Асирович Гольдберг, Ukrainian: Анатолій Асірович Гольдберг, Hebrew: אנטולי גולדברג; April 2, 1930, in Kyiv – October 11, 2008, in Netanya) was a Soviet and Israeli mathematician working in complex analysis. His main area of research was the theory of entire and meromorphic functions.

== Life and work ==
Goldberg received his PhD in 1955 from Lviv University under the direction of Lev Volkovyski. He worked as a docent in Uzhhorod National University (1955–1963), then in Lviv University (1963–1997), where he became a full professor in 1965, and in Bar Ilan University (1997–2008). Goldberg, jointly with Iossif Ostrovskii and Boris Levin, was awarded the State Prize of Ukraine in 1992.

Among his main achievements are:

- construction of meromorphic functions with infinitely many deficient values,
- solution of the inverse problem of Nevanlinna theory for finitely many deficient values,
- development of the integral with respect to a semi-additive measure.

He authored a book Goldberg & Ostrovskii (2008) and over 150 research papers.

Several things are named after him: Goldberg's examples, Goldberg's constants, and Goldberg's conjecture.

== Selected publications ==
- Goldberg, A. A.; Ostrovskii, I. V. (1970). Distribution of values of meromorphic functions (in Russian). Moscow: Nauka. MR 0280720., translated as Goldberg, A. A.; Ostrovskii, I. V. (2008). Distribution of values of meromorphic functions. Providence, RI: Amer. Math. Soc. ISBN 978-0-8218-4265-2. MR 2435270.
