= Petras Griškevičius =

Lithuanian politician (1924-1987)

- Griškevičius in 1985

First Secretary of the Communist Party of Lithuania
- In office 18 February 1974 – 14 November 1987
- Preceded by: Antanas Sniečkus
- Succeeded by: Ringaudas Songaila

Personal details
- Born: 19 July 1924 Kriaunos, Rokiškis District, Lithuania
- Died: 14 November 1987 (aged 63) Vilnius, Lithuanian SSR, Soviet Union
- Party: Communist Party of the Soviet Union (1945–1987)
- Education: Higher Party School under the Central Committee of the CPSU
- Occupation: Military officer; Politician

Petras Petrovičius Griškevičius (Russian: Пя́трас Пя́трович Гришкя́вичюс; 19 July 1924 – 14 November 1987) was a Lithuanian communist politician and Nomenklatura in the Lithuanian SSR. He was the First Secretary of the Lithuanian Communist Party (de facto leader of Lithuanian SSR) from 1974 until his death on 14 November 1987.

== Early life and military career ==
He was born on 19 July 1924 in the village of Kriaunos, in the Rokiškis district of the Republic of Lithuania. He began his career in 1941 as a collective farmer in the eastern part of Chelyabinsk Region. At the beginning of World War II, Griškevičius retreated into the Russian SFSR. During the war, he was a member of the 16th Rifle Division (1942–1943) and a Soviet partisan (1943–1944) in Rokiškis district.

== Party career ==
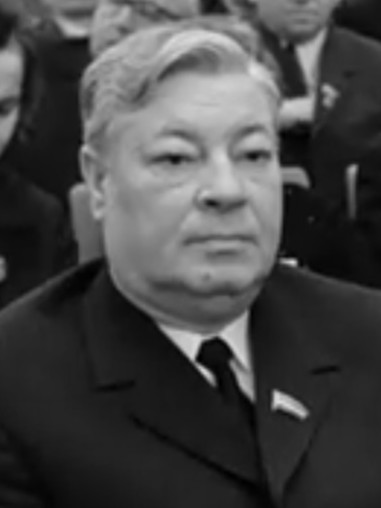
Griškevičius in 1971

After joining the communist party in 1945, he slowly rose through the ranks. He worked in press censorship (1950–1955) before moving to the Vilnius City Committee of the Communist Party of Lithuania. There, he worked at the secretariat (1955–1964) and central committee (1964–1971), becoming the first secretary in 1971.

== Leader of Soviet Lithuania ==
After the death of Antanas Sniečkus in 1974, Griškevičius succeeded him as the First Secretary of the Lithuanian Communist Party. He was also a delegate of the Supreme Soviet of the Lithuanian SSR (since 1965), delegate of the Supreme Soviet of the Soviet Union (since 1974), and member of the Central Committee of the Communist Party of the Soviet Union (since 1976). Griškevičius was described as a Brezhnevite, conservative and "mediocre apparatchik", who opposed perestroika and especially glasnost. He wholeheartedly promoted the spread of Soviet patriotism as a means to combat nationalist dissidence.

== Personal life and death ==
He died in Vilnius on November 14, 1987, and was buried at the Antakalnis Cemetery.

== Awards ==
	Order of Lenin, two times (July 18, 1974; July 18, 1984)
	Order of the October Revolution (August 25, 1971)
	Order of the Patriotic War of the 1st degree (May 10, 1965)
	Order of the Patriotic War of the 2nd degree (March 11, 1985)
	Order of the Red Banner of Labour, two times (October 1, 1965; March 17, 1981)
	Order of the Badge of Honour (July 20, 1950)
	Medal "For Distinguished Labour" (December 24, 1960)
	Medal "To a Partisan of the Patriotic War" of the 1st degree (September 14, 1944)
Other medals

Party political offices
Preceded by Antanas Sniečkus	First Secretary of the Communist Party of Lithuania (LKP); 1974–1987	Succeeded by Ringaudas Songaila
Preceded by Kazimieras Mackevicius	First Secretary of the Vilnius City Committee of the Communist Party of Lithuania; 1971–1974	Succeeded by Vytautas Sakalauskas
