= Ostrovsky (surname) =

Ostrovsky, Ostrovskiy, Ostrovskyi (Note: Russian: Островский, romanized: Ostrovsky; Ukrainian: Островський, romanized: Ostrovskyi; Belarusian: Астроўскі, romanized: Astrowski) (masculine), Ostrovskaya or Ostrovska (Note: Russian: Островская, romanized: Ostrovskaya; Ukrainian: Островська, romanized: Ostrovska; Belarusian: Астроўская, romanized: Astrowskaya) (feminine) are variations of a Slavic surname.

The name is based on the Slavic word for "island":

- Belarusian: востраў (vostraw)
- Russian: остров (ostrov)
- Ukrainian: острів (ostriv)

== Notable people ==
Notable people with the surname include:

- Alexander Ostrovsky (1823–1886), Russian dramatist
- Alexey Ostrovsky (born 1976), Russian politician
- Ana Elisa Ostrovsky (born 1979), Argentine psychologist, researcher and professor
- Anton Ostrovsky (born 1982), Israeli actor and rap singer
- Arkady Ostrovsky (1914–1967), Soviet composer
- Arsen Ostrovsky, Israeli lawyer, currently based in Sydney
- Baruch Ostrovsky (1890–1960), first mayor of Ra'anana, Israel
- Erika Ostrovsky (1926–2010), Austrian-American biographer of Louis-Ferdinand Céline
- Grigory Ostrovsky (1756–1814), Russian portrait painter
- Iossif Ostrovskii (1934–2020), Ukrainian mathematician
- Josh Ostrovsky (born 1982), American entrepreneur, social media personality
- Leonid Ostrovsky (1936–2001), Soviet football star
- Leonard Ostrovsky (1922–1973), US politician in Ohio
- Mikhail Nikolayevich Ostrovsky (1827–1901), Russian statesman
- Nikolai Ostrovsky (1904–1936), Russian Soviet writer, author of the novel How the Steel Was Tempered
- Rafail Ostrovsky (born 1963), professor of computer science and mathematics at UCLA
- Sasha Ostrovsky member of Russian country music band Bering Strait
- Simon Ostrovsky (born 1981), Soviet-born American journalist, director, and producer of documentaries
- Sofiya Ostrovska (born 1958), Ukrainian mathematician
- Victor Ostrovsky (born 1949), Canadian-born, Israel-raised self-proclaimed former Mossad officer and author of several books
- Vivian Ostrovsky (born 1945), experimental filmmaker

== Fictional characters ==
- Elka Ostrovsky, in Hot in Cleveland, a US TV sitcom
- Olive Ostrovsky, in the musical The 25th Annual Putnam County Spelling Bee

== See also ==
- Andrey Astrowski (born 1973), also spelt Andrei Ostrovskiy, former Belarusian footballer
- Ostrovsky (disambiguation)
- Ostrowski (disambiguation)
