= Šepetys =

- Lithuanian surname
- m.: Šepetys
- f.: (unmarried): Šepetytė
- f.: (married): Šepetienė
- Origin: literally means "brush"

Šepetys is a Lithuanian surname. It may also be written as Sepetys, Shepetys or Shepetis. Notable people with the surname include:

- Lionginas Šepetys (1927–2017), Lithuanian politician
- Ruta Sepetys, American writer of Lithuanian origin
