= Ostrovskyi =

Ostrovskyi (feminine: Ostravska) is a Ukrainian surname related to the Polish surname Ostrowsky. Notable people with the surname include:

- Denys Ostrovskyi, Ukrainian footballer
- Olesya Ostrovska-Lyuta (born 1978), Ukrainian cultural manager
- Sofiya Ostrovska, Ukrainian mathematician
- Vladyslav Ostrovskyi, Ukrainian footballer
