= Lionginas =

- Gender: Male
- Language: Lithuanian
- Name day: 15 March

Origin
- Region of origin: Lithuania

Lionginas is a Lithuanian masculine given name. People bearing the name Lionginas include:

- Lionginas Šepetys (1927–2017), Lithuanian politician
- Lionginas Virbalas (born 1961), Lithuanian Roman Catholic prelate, Archbishop of the Roman Catholic Archdiocese of Kaunas
