= Ostrovski =

Ostrovski is a Bulgarian surname or a variant of Russian Ostrovsky. Notable people with the surname include:

- Grisha Ostrovski, Bulgarian film director
- Leonid Ostrovski, Soviet footballer and manager
