= Ostrowski (disambiguation) =

Ostrowski is a Polish surname

Ostrowski may also refer to:

- Ostrowski Prize, a mathematics award
- Kazimierz Ostrowski Award, given to Polish artists and designers
- Ostrów County, Masovian Voivodeship, Poland (Polish: powiat ostrowski)
- Ostrów County, Greater Poland Voivodeship, Poland (Polish: powiat ostrowski)

== See also ==
- Ostrowski numeration, a numeral representation numbers
- Ostrowski's theorem, a mathematical theorem
- Ostrovsky (disambiguation)
