= Ostrovsky =

Ostrovsky may refer to:

- Ostrovsky (surname), several people

== Places ==
- Ostrovsky District, several districts in Russia
- Ostrovsky (inhabited locality), several rural localities in Russia

== See also ==
- House of Ostrovsky, former name of Maly Theatre, Moscow
- Ostrovsky Institute (disambiguation)
- Ostrowski (disambiguation)
