= Ostrofsky =

Ostrofsky is a surname derived from the Polish surname Ostrowski. Notable people with the surname include:

- Marc Ostrofsky, American computer businessman
- Morris Meyer Ostrofsky, or Mo Ostin (1927–2022), American record executive
