= Iossif Ostrovskii =

Soviet and Ukrainian mathematician (1934–2020)

- Born: Iossif Vladimirovich Ostrovskii; 6 April 1934; Dnipropetrovsk, USSR
- Died: 29 November 2020 (aged 86); Ankara, Turkey
- Scientific career
- Fields: Mathematics
- Workplaces: B. Verkin Institute for Low Temperature Physics and Engineering

Iossif Vladimirovich Ostrovskii (Ukrainian: Йосип Володимирович Островський, Russian: Иосиф Владимирович Островский, 6 April 1934 – 29 November 2020, in Ankara) was a Soviet and Ukrainian mathematician who made significant contributions to function theory and probability theory, Corresponding Member of the National Academy of Sciences of Ukraine (1978).

== Biography ==
Iossif Vladimirovich Ostrovskii was born 6 April 1934 in Dnipropetrovsk (now Dnipro). He obtained a degree at National University of Kharkiv in 1956, and entered post-graduate studies, where his supervisor was Boris Yakovlevich Levin. In 1959 he defended his PhD thesis The connection between the growth of a meromorphic function and the distribution of its values by arguments. In 1965 he defended his doctoral thesis Asymptotic properties of entire and meromorphic functions and some of their applications. From 1958 to 1985 he worked at National University of Kharkiv, since 1969 as the head of the Department of Function Theory. From 1986 to 2001 he headed the Department of Function Theory at Verkin Institute for Low Temperature Physics and Engineering.

From 1993 to 2010, he was Professor of the University of Bilkent (Ankara, Turkey).

In 1978 he became the Corresponding Member of the Academy of Sciences of USR (now of the NAS of Ukraine).

Ostrovskii was married to mathematician Larisa Semenovna Kudina. Their children Sofiya Ostrovska and Mikhail Ostrovskii also became mathematicians.

== Awards ==
In 1992 he received the State Prize of the Ukrainian SSR for his work in the theory of functions (together with B. Ya. Levin and A. A. Goldberg).
