= Astrowski =

Astrowski and Astroŭski (feminine: Astrowskaya, Astroŭskaya) are transliterations of the Belarusian surname Астроўскі derived from the Polish surname Ostrowski. Notable people with the surname include:

- Andrey Astrowski, Belarusian footballer
- Nadzieya Astrowskaya or Nadezhda Ostrovskaya, Belarusian tennis player
- Radasłaŭ Astroŭski, Belarusian Axis collaborator
