= Ringaudas Songaila =

Soviet Lithuanian politician (1929–2019)

- Songaila in 1983

First Secretary of the Communist Party of Lithuania
- In office 1 December 1987 – 19 October 1988
- Preceded by: Petras Griškevičius
- Succeeded by: Algirdas Brazauskas

Chairman of the Supreme Soviet of the Lithuanian SSR
- In office 24 December 1975 – 16 January 1981
- Preceded by: Antanas Barkauskas
- Succeeded by: Lionginas Šepetys

Chairman of the Council of Ministers of the Lithuanian SSR
- In office 16 January 1981 – 18 November 1985
- Preceded by: Juozas Maniušis
- Succeeded by: Vytautas Sakalauskas

Personal details
- Born: 20 April 1929 Klaipėda, Lithuania
- Died: 25 June 2019 (aged 90) Trakai, Lithuania
- Party: Communist Party of Lithuania
- Occupation: Veterinarian, politician

Ringaudas Bronislovas Songaila (20 April 1929 – 25 June 2019) was a communist politician and a member of the nomenklatura of the Lithuanian SSR. He was the last First Secretary of the Communist Party of Lithuania (de facto leader of Lithuanian SSR) from December 1987 to October 1988.

== Biography ==
Songaila was born in Klaipėda. He graduated from a veterinary school and within five years became a deputy of the Minister of Agriculture. In 1962, at the age of 33, he became Minister of Production of Agricultural Products and Resources. In agriculture, he worked on increasing the size of kolkhozs (collective farms), increasing centralization and specialization of agricultural production, elimination of single homesteads, and implementation of land improvements.

Songaila was a member of the Central Committee of the Communist Party of Lithuania (1962–1981), Chairman of the Council of Ministers (1981–1985; equivalent to Prime Minister), Chairman of the Presidium of the Supreme Soviet of the Lithuanian SSR (1985–1987; de jure head of state), and First Secretary of the Communist Party of Lithuania (December 1987 – October 1988; de facto head of state).

He was described as a "bland" and indecisive but loyal communist who stayed away from political intrigues and showed interest only in agricultural matters. When Songaila ordered KGB and Internal Troops to forcibly disperse a rally of the radical pro-independence Lithuanian Liberty League on 28 September 1988, he was forced to resign one month later. He was replaced by Algirdas Brazauskas, who supported Sąjūdis movement and Lithuania's declaration of independence in March 1990.

After the resignation, Songaila retired from public life and died on 25 June 2019 in Trakai at the age of 90. He was buried in the Antakalnis Cemetery in Vilnius.

Party political offices
Preceded by Petras Griškevičius	First Secretary of the Communist Party of Lithuania; 1987–1988	Succeeded by Algirdas Brazauskas
