= Ostrovsky District =

Location of Kostroma Oblast in Russia

Location of Pskov Oblast in Russia

Ostrovsky District is the name of several administrative and municipal districts in Russia:

- Ostrovsky District, Kostroma Oblast, an administrative and municipal district of Kostroma Oblast
- Ostrovsky District, Pskov Oblast, an administrative and municipal district of Pskov Oblast

== See also ==
- Ostrovsky (disambiguation)
