= Lionginas Šepetys =

Lithuanian politician

Chairman of the Supreme Soviet of the Lithuanian SSR
- In office June 1981 – 10 March 1990
- Prime Minister: Vytautas Sakalauskas; Ringaudas Songaila
- Preceded by: Ringaudas Songaila
- Succeeded by: Vytautas Landsbergis (Chairman of the Supreme Council)

Personal details
- Born: 23 November 1926 Kazliškiai, Ukmergė District
- Died: 9 December 2017 (aged 91) Vilnius, Lithuania

Lionginas Šepetys (23 November 1926 – 9 December 2017) was a Lithuanian politician. He became Chairman of the Supreme Soviet of the Lithuanian SSR in 1981. In 1990 Šepetys was among those who signed the Act of the Re-Establishment of the State of Lithuania.
