= Vytautas Astrauskas =

Vytautas Astrauskas (30 September 1930 – 7 August 2017) was a communist politician in the Lithuanian SSR. Among his many public offices, he served in the Supreme Soviet of the Lithuanian SSR (the parliament) where from December 1987 to January 1990 he was chairman of the Presidium.

Astrauskas was born in Šiauliai. From 1952 to 1953 he worked for the Communist Party of Lithuania out of their Šiauliai offices. In 1960 he graduated from the Vilnius Higher Party School of the Communist Party. From 1960 to 1966 he worked in the municipal government of Šeduva.

In February 1980 he was first elected to the Supreme Soviet of the Lithuanian SSR. Beginning in 1981 he served as the Lithuanian CP secretary for agriculture. During 1988 and 1989 he was also a deputy in the Supreme Soviet of the Soviet Union.

On 15 January 1990, Astrauskas resigned his position as chairman of the Lithuanian Presidium citing health reasons. He was replaced the same day by Algirdas Brazauskas.

He died on 7 August 2017 in Vilnius and was buried in Antakalnis Cemetery.

== Sources ==
- Tininis, Vytautas (2002). "Vytautas Astrauskas". In Račis, Antanas; et al. (eds.). Visuotinė lietuvių enciklopedija, Volume II (Arktis to Beketas) (in Lithuanian). Vilnius: Mokslo ir Enciklpediju̧ Leidybos Institutas. p. 100. ISBN 978-5-420-01486-8.
- Astrauskas, Vytautas (2006). Rėminti Laike: Prisiminimai ir Pamąstymai [Framed in Time: Memories and Reflections] (in Lithuanian). Vilnius: Gairės. ISBN 978-9986-625-78-0. (autobiographical)
