= Ostrowsko =

Ostrowsko may refer to:

- Ostrowsko, Lesser Poland Voivodeship, Poland
- Ostrowsko, Łódź Voivodeship, Poland
