= Antanas Sniečkus =

Lithuanian communist politician (1903–1974)

- Sniečkus, date and location unknown

First Secretary of the Communist Party of Lithuania
- In office 15 August 1940 – 22 January 1974
- Preceded by: Office created
- Succeeded by: Petras Griškevičius

Personal details
- Born: Antanas Gintautas Sniečkus; 7 January 1903 Būbleliai, Suwałki Governorate, Russian Empire
- Died: 22 January 1974 (aged 71) Druskininkai, Lithuanian SSR, Soviet Union
- Resting place: Antakalnis Cemetery
- Party: Communist Party of Lithuania (1920–1974)
- Spouse: Mira Bordonaitė
- Children: Vladas and Marytė

Antanas Sniečkus (7 January 1903 [O.S. 25 December 1902] – 22 January 1974) was a Lithuanian communist politician who served as the First Secretary of the Communist Party of Lithuania (de facto leader of Lithuanian SSR) from 15 August 1940 to his death on 22 January 1974.

== Early life ==
Sniečkus was born in 1903, in the village of Būbleliai, near Šakiai. During the First World War, his family fled to Russia, where he observed the Russian revolution of 1917. In 1919, his family returned to Lithuania; by 1920, he was already a member of the Bolshevik Party. In the same year, he was arrested for anti-government activities. He was released from prison on bail, but fled to Moscow, and became an agent of the Comintern. In Moscow, he earned the trust of Zigmas Angarietis and Vincas Mickevičius-Kapsukas, and became a member of the Central Committee of the Communist Party of Lithuania. In 1926, the Comintern sent Sniečkus to Lithuania to replace the recently executed Karolis Požėla as head of the banned and underground Communist Party of Lithuania.

From 1926 to 1930, he engaged in subversive activities in Lithuania, and was again arrested and imprisoned for them in Kaunas Prison in 1930. In 1933, Sniečkus was released in exchange for Lithuanian political prisoners held in the USSR. In 1936, he returned to Lithuania. In 1939, he was arrested again, and sentenced to eight years in prison.

== Annexation of Lithuania ==
After the 1940 Soviet ultimatum to Lithuania and subsequent military occupation, Sniečkus was released from prison on 18 June 1940, and became the head of the Department of National Security. Foreign Affairs Commissar Vladimir Dekanozov arrived in Lithuania a few days earlier on 15 June to organize the incorporation of Lithuania into the Soviet Union. As party secretary, Sniečkus issued Vladimir Dekanozov’s orders in the party’s name. Sniečkus helped create an atmosphere of terror prior to the elections of the newly established, by the Soviet authorities, People's Seimas, on 14 July. Only the Communist Party of Lithuania and its collaborators could nominate candidates. People were threatened in various ways to participate in the elections, but the results were falsified anyway. On 21 July, the People's Seimas declared that the Lithuanian "people" wanted to join the Soviet Union, and on 3 August, the Supreme Soviet of the USSR annexed Lithuania into the Soviet Union. The illegal process of annexation was formally over and the Lithuanian Soviet Socialist Republic was created. From 15 August until his death, Sniečkus was the most powerful man in Lithuania.

Sniečkus initiated the first mass deportations of Lithuanians on 14–19 June 1941. He even had his own brother, with his family, deported to Siberia, where his brother died. When Soviet party chief Nikita Khrushchev issued an amnesty program, many political prisoners and deportees were released from prisons and labour camps, but Sniečkus did not allow them to return to Lithuania.

== World War II ==
On 26 November 1942, the Lithuanian Partisan Movement (Lietuvos partizaninio judėjimo štabas) was created in Moscow, under the command of Sniečkus, who had retreated with the Red Army to Moscow in 1941. The existence of the Command of Lithuanian Partisan Movement had to show the Lithuanian nature of Soviet partisans actions in Lithuania, but in reality, groups of saboteurs sent from Moscow did not report to the Command of Lithuanian Partisan Movement and instead reported directly to the Central Command of the Partisan Movement. It is estimated that in Lithuania, five to ten thousand people engaged in Soviet underground activities during the war.

In 1944, due to the advance of the Red Army, his mother fled Lithuania to the West, and disowned her son. Two brothers and three sisters of Antanas Sniečkus also fled to the West. Sniečkus returned from Russia in 1944 with the Communist officials who had retreated during the German invasion of 22 June 1941.

== Rule over Soviet Lithuania ==
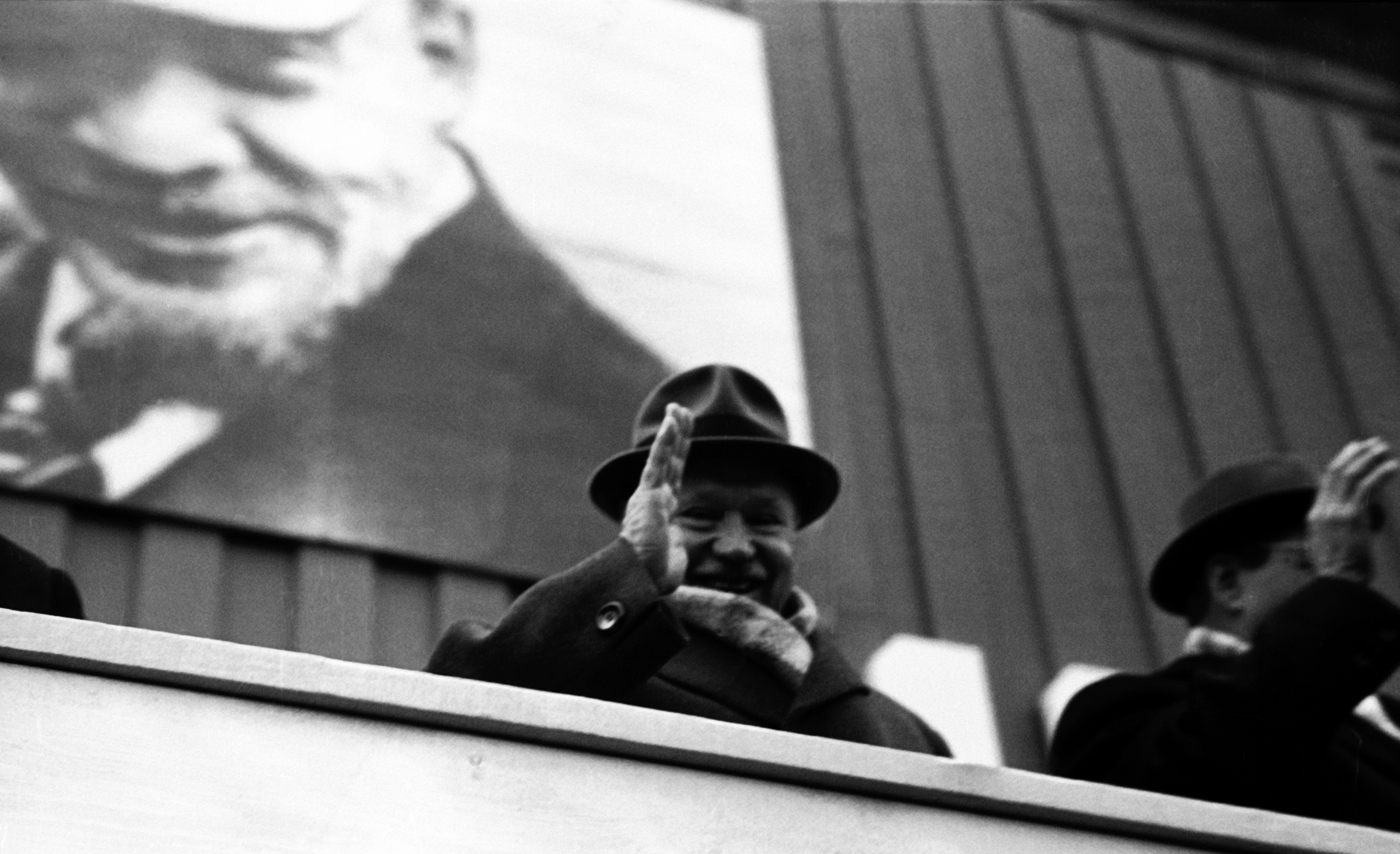
Sniečkus waving during the Revolution Day celebrations in 1970.

During the later decades of Sniečkus' rule, nationalist orientation was noticeable in his activities. His first confrontation with Moscow happened in 1949–1950, when he had to defend his old communist friends, whom he was working with underground, from persecution. Lithuania was the only republic of the USSR where not only did mass persecution of old communists not happen, but not a single communist of pre-Soviet times was accused and arrested. Around this time, his policies started to gain a nationalist character in the form of sabotaging some orders of Moscow and demanding some privileges for Lithuania and others.

He died on January 22, 1974. He was buried at Antakalnis Cemetery.

== After his death ==
Sniečkus, a village for employees of the Ignalina Nuclear Power Plant on the shores of Lake Drūkšiai, was founded in 1975. In 1992, the town was renamed Visaginas and in 1995, it received city rights. Some attempts have been made in Lithuania to rehabilitate Sniečkus, who was more or less successfully mythologized for several decades.

== Personal life ==
His wife Mira Bordonaitė was also a convinced communist and spent many years in prison. Sniečkus had two children, Vladas and Marytė.

== Awards ==
Order of Lenin, eight times (8 April 1947, 20 July 1950, 6 January 1953, 5 April 1958, 5 January 1963, 1 October 1965, 27 August 1971, 5 January 1973)
Order of the Red Banner, two times (2 July 1945, 19 July 1949)
Order of the Patriotic War of the 1st degree (21 March 1945)
Medal "For Labour Valour" (25 December 1959)
Medal "To a Partisan of the Patriotic War" of the 1st degree (17 April 1945)
Medal "For the Victory over Germany in the Great Patriotic War 1941–1945" (1941–1945)

== See also ==
- Lithuanian partisans (1941)
- 1940 Soviet ultimatum to Lithuania
- Occupation of the Baltic states
- Baltic states under Soviet rule

Party political offices
Preceded by Office created	First Secretary of the Communist Party of Lithuania; 1940–1974	Succeeded by Petras Griškevičius
