= Erika Ostrovsky =

Austrian-born American biographer (1926–2010)

Erika Ostrovsky (née Spielberg; May 30, 1926 – February 15, 2010) was an Austrian-born American biographer who wrote Céline and his Vision (1967).

== Biography ==
Erika Spielberg was born in Vienna on May 30, 1926. She was educated mainly in the United States.

Her interest in Louis-Ferdinand Céline stemmed from a 3-year stay in France, where she studied at the Alliance Française and the Sorbonne. She was Assistant Professor of French at New York University. She has been active in the discovery, identification, and acquisition of important unpublished Céline manuscripts for the New York University Libraries.

Kurt Vonnegut refers to Céline and his Vision in his book Slaughterhouse Five (1969).

Ostrovsky died on February 15, 2010, at the age of 83.
