= Rimantas Astrauskas =

Lithuanian scientist

Rimantas Astrauskas (born 16 March 1955 in Panevėžys, Lithuania) is a physicist, ecologist, and signatory of the 1990 Act of the Re-Establishment of the State of Lithuania.
