= Ostrowsky =

Ostrowsky is a surname derived from the Polish surname Ostrowski. Notable people with the surname include:

- Abbo Ostrowsky (1889–1975), American artist
- Avi Ostrowsky, Israeli musician and conductor
- Chris Ostrowsky (born c. 1971), American football coach
- Ido Ostrowsky (born 1979), American film producer
