= Ostrovsky Institute =

Ostrovsky Institute may refer to:

- Russian State Institute of Performing Arts in Leningrad, once called Ostrovsky Leningrad Theatre Institute (or Ostrovsky Institute)
- Uzbekistan State Institute of Arts and Culture in Tashkent, formerly the Ostrovsky Institute, founded in 1945
