= Kostas Ostrauskas =

Lithuanian writer (1926–2012)

- Born: Konstantinas Ostrauskas; 5 April 1926; Veiveriai, Lithuania
- Died: 9 January 2012 (aged 85); Newtown Square, Pennsylvania, United States
- Resting place: Petrašiūnai Cemetery
- Education: University of Pennsylvania
- Occupations: Playwright; journalist
- Writing career
- Years active: 1943–2012
- Genres: Absurdism, postmodernism
- Notable work: Gyveno kartą senelis ir senelė (1963–1969)

Kostas Ostrauskas (5 April 1926 – 9 January 2012) was a Lithuanian émigré avant-garde playwright and journalist.

== Biography ==
=== Early life ===
Kostas Ostrauskas was born in April 1926 in Veiveriai. His father was an organist and choirmaster. He moved to Šančiai in 1930. Ostrauskas attended the Kaunas Aušra Gymnasium and the Kaunas 6th Gymnasium After the sixth grade, in 1943 Ostrauskas passed an exam which let him enter and act at the Kaunas Youth Theater. Ostrauskas moved to Germany in 1944, fleeing the Eastern Front of World War Two. Ostrauskas attended a Lithuanian gymnasium in Lübeck from 1944 to 1946. After graduating, Ostrauskas studied Lithuanistics at the Pinneberg Baltic University, a university for displaced persons for refugees of the occupied Baltic states. During his stay in the camp, Ostrauskas organized the performance of Vincas Krėvė-Mickevičius's Šarūnas and Balys Sruoga's Baisioji naktis. He also participated in a singing studio and performed in various camps.

=== Immigration to the United States ===
Ostrauskas moved to the United States in 1949. He briefly joined the Metropolitan Opera before renouncing his decision. He began studying Lithuanistics and Slavistics at the University of Pennsylvania in 1950, graduating with a magister's degree in 1952. He would receive his doctor's degree in 1958. Until 1989, Ostrauskas worked at the university's library, as well as the music department from 1958 to 1978. From 1954, Ostrauskas frequently collaborated in the Lithuanian Encyclopedia. In the United States, Ostrauskas was an honorary member of the liberal Santara-Šviesa federation. From 1961 he worked at the Institute of the Lithuanian Language, and was the head of its literature department from 1965 to 1974. From 1962 to 1967 Ostrauskas was a member of the cultural council of the Lithuanian World Community.

=== Death ===
Ostrauskas died on 9 January 2012 in Newtown Square, Pennsylvania. He was initially buried in the United States, but was reburied in the Petrašiūnai Cemetery in 2015.

== Literary works ==
Ostrauskas's early plays, such as Pypkė (1951), are marked by absurdism. His later works have been described as postmodern. Ostrauskas also published smaller plays in various magazines. Artistically, Ostrauskas combined art, literature, and music into his works. Metai (1968), which was based on Antonio Vivaldi's The Four Seasons. Additionally, Gundymai (1983) was based on Hieronymus Bosch's paintings. Ars amoris (1991), which is considered the first Lithuanian postmodern drama, is based on the ambiguity of love. The characters are varied and brought together from works of various eras; Beatrice from Dante's Divine Comedy, Cervantes's Don Quixote, Shakespeare's Prince Hamlet, and Goethe's Faust make an appearance. Ostrauskas also wrote plays on the lives of Antanas Baranauskas and Balys Sruoga.

Ostrauskas is best known for his three-part play Gyveno kartą senelis ir senelė (1963–1969). The story's main grandparents (like the characters in Ataraxia, a play by Antanas Škėma) are both victims (the grandparents' only son died in a car accident) and executioners (in revenge for the loss of their son, they kill the students renting their room). The crimes are not revealed directly but in a tragicomic way. The grandparents are a metonymy of a world based on violence, but nonetheless are people who are immersed by culture and humanity.

Ostrauskas's absurdist play Who Is Godot? (1999) is a response to Samuel Beckett's Waiting for Godot. According to Ostrauskas, absurdist theater lets a person reflect on themselves, which he claims is a person's biggest value.
