= Vytautas Sakalauskas =

Lithuanian politician (1933–2001)

Sakalauskas in 1988

Vytautas Sakalauskas (24 April 1933 – 29 May 2001) was a Lithuanian Soviet politician who was the last Chairman of the Council of Ministers (Prime Minister) of the Lithuanian Soviet Socialist Republic before Lithuanian independence in 1990.

== Biography ==
Sakalauskas served his compulsory military service in a sapper battalion in the Kirghiz SSR and Uzbek SSR between 1950 and 1953. After graduation from Kaunas Polytechnic Institute in 1956, Sakalauskas worked as a master metal welder in engineering and transportation departments of various State-owned companies until 1969. He joined the Communist Party of the Soviet Union in 1955. From 1955 to 1983, he was a member of the Vilnius branch of the Lithuanian Communist Party, becoming the branch's first secretary in 1974. Sakalauskas was elected to the Supreme Soviet of the Soviet Union in 1974 and the Supreme Soviet of the Lithuanian SSR in 1976. From 1985 to 1990, he was the Chairman of the Council of Ministers (equivalent to Prime Minister).

Sakalauskas was not re-elected to the Supreme Soviet in the parliamentary elections in 1990 and largely retired from Lithuanian politics. He headed the Soviet trade mission in Maputo, Mozambique. In preparation for the events of January 1991, the KGB brought Sakalauskas to Moscow in an attempt to recruit him for the planned coup by the National Salvation Committee. Sakalauskas was offered to head the planned pro-Moscow government, but he refused and returned to Mozambique. After the collapse of the Soviet Union, he returned to Lithuania and worked in the private sector.
