= Sofiya Ostrovska =

Ukrainian mathematician

Sofiya Ostrovska (born 1958) is a Ukrainian mathematician interested in probability theory and approximation theory, and known for her research on q-Bernstein polynomials, the q-analogs of the Bernstein polynomials. She has also published works in computer science concerning software engineering. She is a professor of mathematics at Atılım University in Turkey.

== Early life and education ==
Ostrovska was born on 26 September 1958 in Sloviansk, then part of the Soviet Union. Her parents, Larisa Semenovna Kudina and Iossif Ostrovskii, were both mathematicians, and her younger brother Mikhail Ostrovskii, became a mathematics professor at St. John's University (New York City).

She studied mathematics at Kharkov State University (renamed as the National University of Kharkiv in 1999), earning a bachelor's degree in 1977 and master's degree in 1980. She completed her Ph.D. in 1989 at Kyiv State University, again later renamed as the Taras Shevchenko National University of Kyiv.

== Career ==
From 1984 to 1993 she was an assistant professor at the Kharkiv Polytechnic Institute, and from 1993 to 1995 she was an associate professor at Kharkov State University. In 1995 she moved to the H.S. Skovoroda Kharkiv National Pedagogical University and in 1996 she relocated to Turkey, initially as an associate professor at Dokuz Eylül University in İzmir. She became a full professor at the İzmir Institute of Technology in 2000, and took her present position at Atılım University in 2001.
