= Boris Levin =

Soviet mathematician

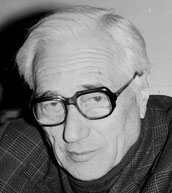
- Born: Boris Yakovlevich Levin; 22 December 1906; Odessa, Russian Empire
- Died: 24 August 1993 (aged 86); Moscow, Russian Federation
- Scientific career
- Fields: Mathematics
- Workplaces: B Verkin Institute for Low Temperature Physics and Engineering

Boris Yakovlevich Levin (Ukrainian: Борис Якович Левін, Russian: Борис Яковлевич Левин, 22 December 1906 – 24 August 1993) was a Soviet mathematician who made significant contributions to function theory.

== Biography ==
Boris Yakovlevich Levin was born 22 December 1906 in Odessa.

In 1932 he graduated from the University of North Caucasus (Rostov-on-Don). From 1935 to 1949 he is Professor and Head of the Department of Mathematics of the Odessa Institute of Marine Engineers.

In 1949, invited by N. I. Akhiezer, he moved to Kharkov, and since that time he worked at the Kharkov State University.

In 1969 he organized the Department of Function Theory in the Institute for Low Temperature Physics and Engineering of Ukrainian Academy of Sciences, in which he worked until his last days (as a Chief of the Department he worked until 1986).

Levin died in Moscow on 24 August 1993, at the age of 86.

== Scientific interests ==
Research of B.Ya. Levin concerns the theory of entire functions, functional analysis, harmonic analysis, the theory of almost periodic and quasi-analytic functions. He obtained the fundamental results concerning non-harmonic Fourier series and operators preserving inequalities in various classes of entire functions of exponential type. Together with N.I. Akhiezer, he discovered a relation between extremal problems of the theory of entire functions and conformal transformations onto canonical domains. He introduced a class of operators of transformation, which is the basis for solving the inverse scattering problem.

The theory of entire functions of completely regular growth brought fame to Boris Yakovlevich Levin. He created this theory in the mid 1930s concurrently with Albert Pfluger. This theory describes a very wide class of entire functions, containing the majority of entire functions encountered in applications. For the functions of this class, the relation between their behaviour at infinity and distribution of zeros can be described by the asymptotic formulas.

In 1956, Boris Yakovlevich published his monograph "Distribution of zeros of entire functions", which was translated into German and English, and which is, to the present day, the handbook for many professionals working in different areas of mathematics.

In the same year, Boris Yakovlevich organized the seminar in Kharkiv University. For almost 40 years it was a school for Kharkov's mathematicians working in the field of Analysis, as well as the center of mathematical research.

In 1997 a Boris Levin memorial conference "Entire Functions in Modern Analysis" was held at Tel-Aviv University. In September 1997 an international seminar dedicated to the memory of Boris Levin was organized by Institute for Low Temperature Physics and Engineering. In 2006 an international conference dedicated to the centennial of Boris Levin's birth took place in Kharkov.

== Bibliography ==
- B.Ya.Levin. Lectures on entire functions. English revised edition. Amer. Math. Soc., Providence, RI, 1996.
- Distribution of zeros of entire functions, 1964, Amer. Math. Soc, Providence, R. I ., 493 pp. Revised edition, 1980, Amer. Math. Soc, Providence, R.I., 523 pp.
- Nullstellenverteilung ganzer Funktionen, 1962, Math. Lehrbucher und Monographien, Bd. XIV, Akademie-Verlag, Berlin, 512.
- Распределение корней целых функций, 1956, Гостехиздат, М., 632 стр.
