= Supreme Soviet of the Lithuanian Soviet Socialist Republic =

Legislature of the Lithuanian SSR (1940–1990)

Supreme Soviet of the Lithuanian SSR Lietuvos TSR Aukščiausioji Taryba Верховный Совет Литовской ССР
- Lithuanian SSR (1940–1941, 1944–1990)
- Coat of arms of the Lithuanian Soviet Socialist Republic

Type
- Type: Supreme Soviet

History
- Established: 1940; 1947 (Re-established)
- Disbanded: 1941 (Nazi occupation); 1990 (Declaration of independence)
- Preceded by: People's Seimas
- Succeeded by: Supreme Council – Reconstituent Seimas

Elections
- Last election: 1990

Meeting place
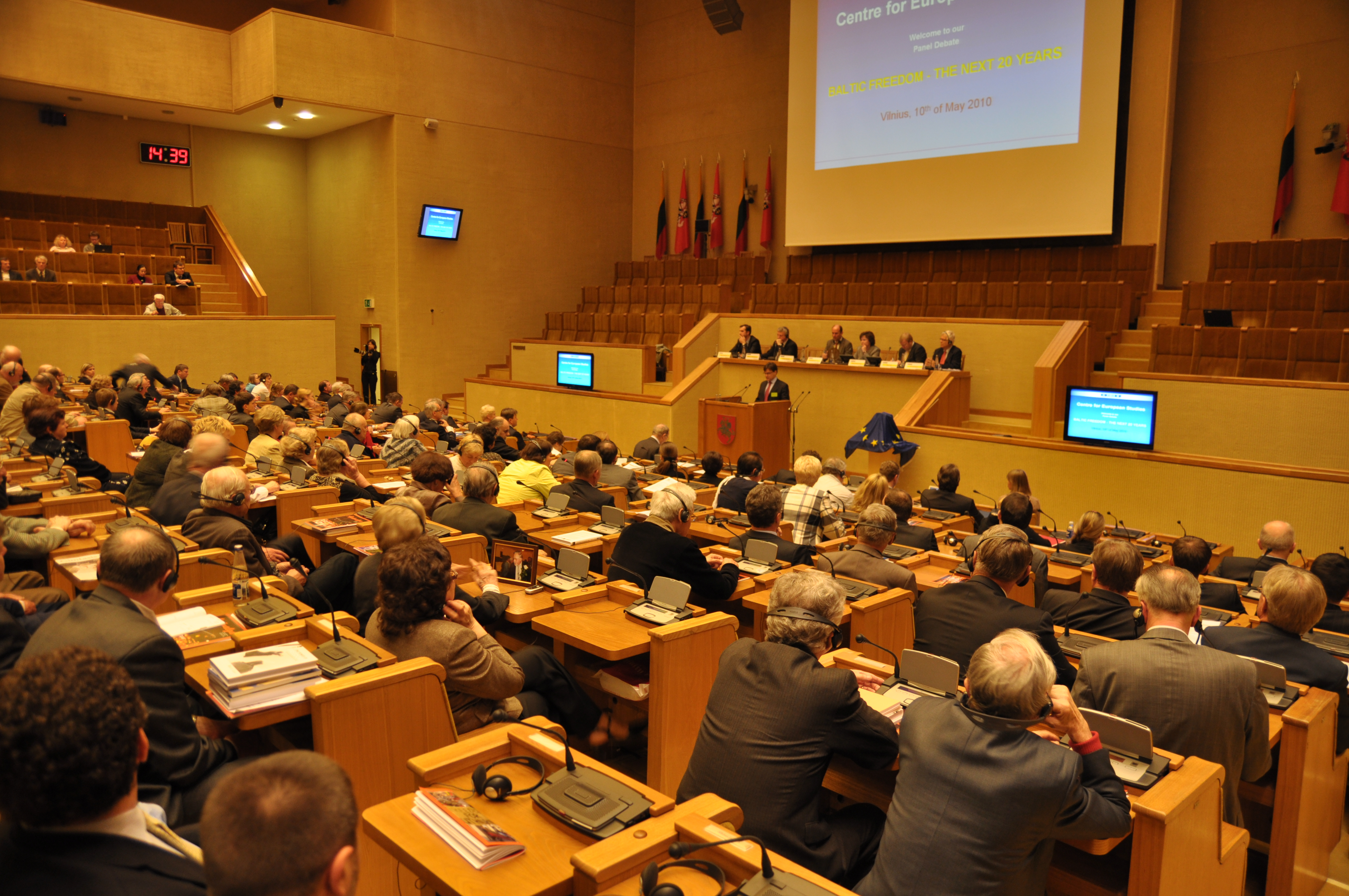
- Russian Drama Theatre of Lithuania, Vilnius (1947–1981); Soviet Palace, Vilnius (1981–1990, pictured)

The Supreme Soviet of the Lithuanian SSR (Lithuanian: Lietuvos TSR Aukščiausioji Taryba; Russian: Верховный Совет Литовской ССР, Verkhovnyy Sovet Litovskoy SSR) was the highest organ of state authority of the Lithuanian SSR, one of the republics constituting the Soviet Union. The Supreme Soviet was established in August 1940 when the People's Seimas declared itself the provisional Supreme Soviet. According to the constitution it was very similar to modern democratic parliaments: it was elected every four (later five) years and had the power to create, amend and ratify the constitution, laws, and treaties and appoint officials in the Council of Ministers (the executive branch). However, in reality the elections were staged, the Soviet had very little actual power and carried out orders given by the Communist Party of Lithuania (CPL). The situation changed in 1988, when the Lithuanians began seeking independence from the Soviet Union. The political power shifted from CPL to the Soviet, which adopted a number of important constitutional amendments and laws, paving the way for the independence. The first free elections were held in February 1990 and were won by pro-independence Sąjūdis. During its first session the Supreme Soviet adopted the Act of the Re-Establishment of the State of Lithuania and renamed itself the Supreme Council of the Republic of Lithuania.

== Organization ==
The structure and functions of the Supreme Soviet of the Lithuanian SSR were copied from the Supreme Soviet of the Soviet Union. The sessions of the Supreme Soviet lasted only several days twice a year and decisions were made unanimously and without much discussion. Until the dedicated Seimas Palace was completed in 1981, the Soviet gathered at the Russian Drama Theater of Lithuania.

In between the session the Presidium acted on behalf of the Supreme Soviet. The representatives were elected in general elections every four (since 1975 – every five) years. The elections were held in February 1947, February 1951, February 1955, March 1959, March 1963, March 1967, June 1971, June 1975, February 1980, February 1985, and February 1990. All candidates had to be pre-approved by the CPL, which did not allow any members of the opposition to run. The candidates were selected so that each Soviet had the same proportion of social groups; for example, women comprised about a third of the delegates, factory workers about a half. According to official results, voter turnout reached 97.91% during the 1947 elections. Other elections, except for the one in February 1990, were similarly staged. One delegate represented approximately 10,000 people; thus the number of delegates grew from 180 in 1947 to 350 in 1980.

== Chairmen of the Supreme Soviet ==
The chairman of the Supreme Soviet was the presiding officer (speaker) of the supreme soviet.

Chairman	From	To	Notes
Boleslavas Baranauskas	August 25, 1940	1951	In RSFSR exile 1941–1944 due to World War II
Feliksas Bieliauskas	1951	1955	
Vladas Niunka	1955	April 18, 1963	
Antanas Barkauskas	April 18, 1963	December 24, 1975	
Ringaudas Songaila	December 24, 1975	January 16, 1981	
Lionginas Šepetys	June 1981	March 10, 1990	
Vytautas Landsbergis	March 11, 1990	March 11, 1990	Became chairman of the Reconstituent Seimas

== Presidium of the Supreme Soviet ==
Composition of the Supreme Soviet
Year	1967	1971	1975	1980
Number of deputies	290	300	320	350
Members of CPSU	67%	68%	67%	67%
Factory workers	51%	50%	50%	50%
Women	32%	32%	34%	35%
Youth representatives	11%	17%	20%	20%
With higher education	42%	45%	48%	51%
Re-elected deputies	31%	31%	33%	30%

The presidium was the permanent body of the Supreme Soviet. Its chairman was the de jure head of state. The presidium (chairman, two deputy chairmen, secretary, and 13 other members) was elected during the first session of the Soviet. Formally it had great power while the Supreme Soviet was not in session. For example, it could ratify international treaties or amend laws. However, in reality it was a rubber stamp institution for the CPL and de facto head of state was the First Secretary of the CPL.

The chairmen of the presidium were:

Name	From	To	Notes
Justas Paleckis (1899–1980)	August 25, 1940	April 14, 1967	In RSFSR exile 1941–1944 due to World War II
Motiejus Šumauskas (1905–1982)	April 14, 1967	December 24, 1975	
Antanas Barkauskas (1917–2008)	December 24, 1975	November 18, 1985	
Ringaudas Songaila (1929–2019)	November 18, 1985	December 7, 1987	
Vytautas Astrauskas (1930–2017)	December 7, 1987	January 15, 1990	
Algirdas Brazauskas (1932–2010)	January 15, 1990	March 11, 1990	

== Declaration of independence ==
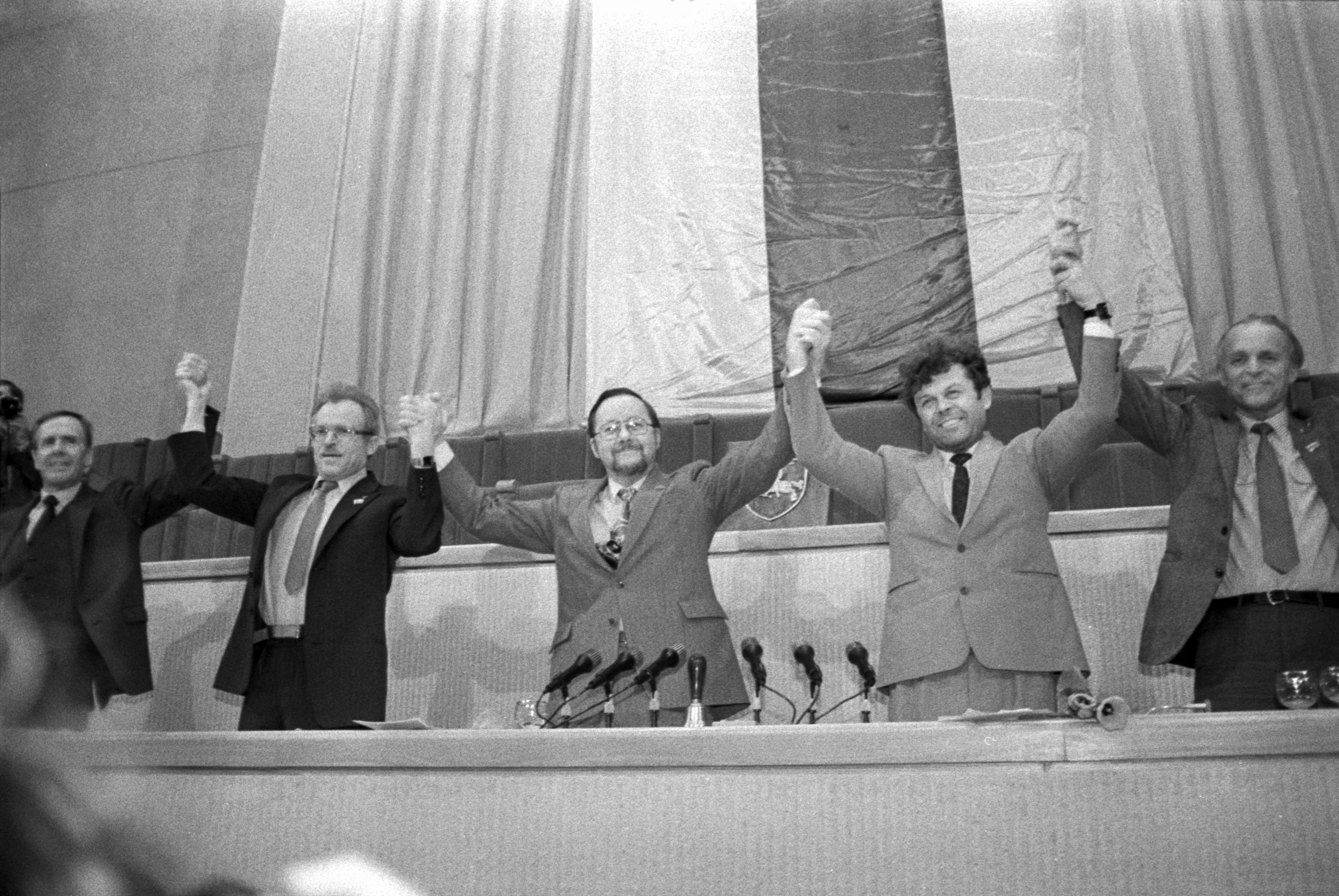
Leaders of the Supreme Council of Lithuania on 11 March 1990, after the promulgation of the Act of the Re-Establishment of the State of Lithuania

The Soviet became an important political battleground since 1988. Inspired and encouraged by perestroika and glastnost, the Lithuanians began taking steps towards independence or at least autonomy from the Soviet Union. The Soviet became the official venue to seek independence in a legal manner. Starting with its 10th session on October 17–18, 1988, the proceedings were televised, hotly debated, and in the center of attention. The political power shifted from the Central Committee of the Communist Party of Lithuania to the Supreme Soviet, which transformed itself from a rubber stamp institution to an actual legislature. In about a year and a half, the Soviet reinstated interwar coat of arms of Lithuania and national anthem Tautiška giesmė, declared superiority of Lithuanian laws over the laws of the Soviet Union, laid groundwork for de-collectivisation, investigated and condemned events surrounding the occupation of Lithuania in 1940, granted religious freedom, adopted citizenship law, enacted new truly democratic election law reducing the number of delegates to 141, abolished political monopoly of the Communist Party allowing other parties to run in the next election. The delegates struggled with changed duties. About 100 of conservative, pro-Soviet delegates did not attend the sessions. Others, accustomed to blindly following orders from top, voted according to the wishes of the presidium and displayed political immaturity. For example, during a vote to appoint Kazimira Prunskienė as a deputy Prime Minister, 100 votes were cast against her during a secret ballot. When the vote was repeated, this time in public, not a single delegate voted against her and only a few abstained. In August 1989, the Soviet announced that the 1939 Molotov–Ribbentrop Pact directly resulted in the Baltics being forcibly incorporated into the USSR in 1940. This marked the first time in the country's history that an official Soviet body challenged the authority of Soviet rule.

In February 1990 elections, when for the first time candidates from the opposition were allowed to run, candidates endorsed by pro-independence Sąjūdis won 96 seats out of 141. During its first three sessions on March 11, 1990, the Soviet elected Vytautas Landsbergis as the chairman and adopted the Act of the Re-Establishment of the State of Lithuania. The same day the Soviet changed its name to the Supreme Council of the Republic of Lithuania. It is also known as Supreme Council – Reconstituent Seimas (Aukščiausioji Taryba – Atkuriamasis Seimas).

The council held its last session on November 11, 1992. It was succeeded by democratically elected Seimas.
