= Walulis (web series) =

German web-series

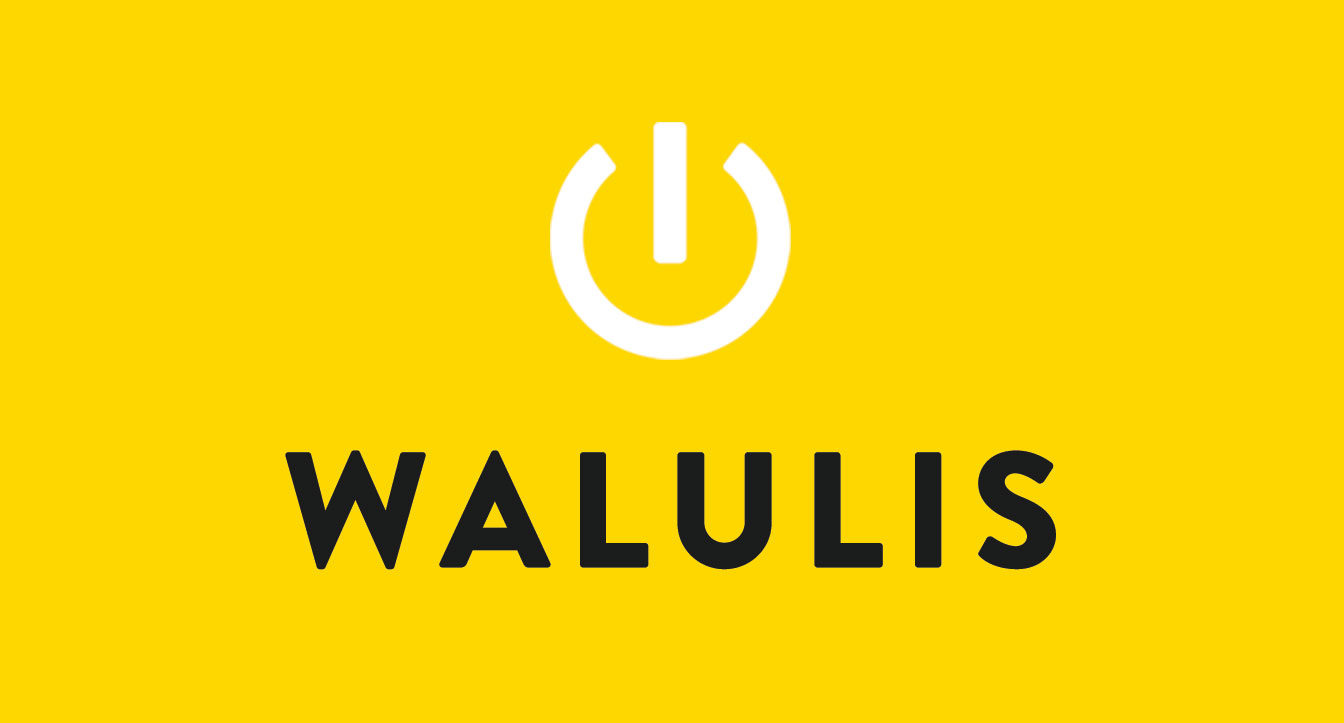
- Genre: Satire, Comedy
- Created by: Philipp Walulis
- Presented by: Philipp Walulis
- Country of origin: Germany
- Original language: German
- No. of episodes: 425+

Production
- Producers: Klaus Kranewitter, Tobias Klose
- Running time: c. 10 minutes
- Production company: Enrico Pallazzo – Gesellschaft für gute Unterhaltung

Original release
- Network: Funk
- Release: 1 October 2016

Walulis (stylized in uppercase in its logo) was a German satirical program that criticizes recent trends in the media. The slogan of the show is „WALULIS – die Medikamentenausgabe im Irrenhaus Internet“ (Eng.: "WALULIS – the medicine delivery in the madhouse internet"). Walulis is a further development of Walulis sieht fern, which ran on EinsPlus.

It was produced for funk, which is the online offering of ARD and ZDF, until the end of August 2020. Afterwards it was produced for SWR3 until its discontinuation in May 2023.

== Origin ==
The goal was to reconceptualize the TV format Walulis sieht fern for YouTube. Therefore, presenter Philipp Walulis and his team analyzed the functioning of successful YouTube formats in a three-monthly period of development with the title "Make The Internet Great Again". They thought about how they could use this new knowledge in their own format and make the best out of their Television experience and the demands on YouTube videos. This period of development was public and the users were called out to give suggestions and offer criticism.

From the 16th of November 2016 till the 31st of August 2020 Walulis was a part of funk. After that, they changed to their current network SWR3, renamed the show to Walulis Story and created a new channel and video design.

Since September 2019, an additional YouTube channel called Walulis Daily exists, which reminds in the principle of the form of the regular channel Walulis, but releases a video from Monday to Thursday about short-term political subjects (often apart from the media focused content as seen Walulis, see the following paragraph). Since October 2019, the channel releases moreover Friday a longer video with studio audience, which acts as week review under the name Walulis Daily Turbo, which features besides the main subject other – mostly strange – news („Geilmeildung“) and contributions of the community („Retro-Show“).

Walulis Daily was a part of funk and was discontinued in May 2023.

Since 24 September 2020, the show Walulis Woche is running. It is a weekly review which is uploaded every Thursday to the ARD Mediathek with Walulis Story as its last part. Since 1 March 2021, clips of Walulis Woche are also uploaded to the channel WALULIS STORY - SWR3 on YouTube. Walulis Story ended in June 2022.

== Content ==
In one videos per week (they produced two and three videos per week for some time), which are released in the funk media library and on YouTube, Walulis discusses monothematicly a media trend and shows the background. The range of topics goes over current TV events, critical inspections of YouTubers and differentiated views of current hypes on the Internet.

== Structure ==
The videos are always based on an elaborately researched journalistic core, which is packed with humor. The episodes are recorded in a studio with a late-night look, where Philipp Walulis is at his desk. The usual coffee cup at Walulis has the shape of poop emoji . The videos are interrupted by excerpts from other broadcasts and small game sequences. Other members of the team can be seen in the game sequences, for example "the Assi". Each episode also contains some of the following fixed elements:

Recurring elements
Form	Meaning
The call to subscribe	Instead of just calling out to like, subscribe and comment as usual, they are making small videos in which the call is humorously packaged. At the beginning of the series, it was a collection of pre-produced videos, which were used multiple times independently from the content of the video. Now own ends are produced for every video.
The renowned Birnbaum-Institut	It's a parody on polling institutes. The polling results are presented as renowned research but are just complete nonsense. This was taken from the predecessor.
The antisocial person ("the Assi")	As a little man from the street, the "beer lover" throws in his populistic opinion, which is often the opposite of Philipp's differentiated opinion. He speaks in a Rhineland dialect.
The Safari Cat	This cat appears every time in new forms in the joke overlays. This is a reference to the success of cat videos on the Internet. She has her own band.
The unexpected Hitler analogy	An element announced by an elaborate graphic, which announces the drifting of the argument to an inappropriate Hitler comparison. The role model is Godwin's law. Sometimes, however, this is omitted and the audience should write their own joke in the comments.
The homeless person	An educated, but homeless person, who is regularly visited by the moderator to explain difficult facts in an understandable manner as an expert on mostly economic issues.
Forrest Drunk (Walulis Daily)	Editorial member Leo recites the daily column of Franz Josef Wagner from the BILD newspaper in a very pushy and hopelessly drunk manner to another editorial member. The title and setting - a park bench - the rubric alludes to the film Forrest Gump.
Law Facts with Poddy	Editorial member Poddy explains the legal basis of the respective video topic to some other employees. The humor stems from the overly enthusiastic reactions to rather lengthy issues. The segment always ends with a running gag, which stages various bizarre headgear.
The "Seuchensack" (refers to the beanbag on which they narrate their stories) of Truth (Walulis Daily)	In the course of the COVID-19 pandemic in Germany, per video two or three alternating editorial members mostly gave humorously exaggerated impressions of their everyday life in the home office.
Señor Pinkie (Walulis Daily)	Señor Pinkie is a racoon handpuppet, that is spoken with a Mexican accent. It pops up on different occasions in some episodes und comments on topics.

However, there are also videos that deviate from this format. The series "Warum eigentlich?" (eng. Why is this actually?) dispenses with the elements mentioned above. Instead, these are shorter animated videos, which are synchronized by Walulis. They always get to the bottom of a specific question about media (e.g. "Why is there still Teletext?"). This is contrasted by the "Community Service", which appears once a month and extends the standard format of the channel. Walulis is supported by a member of the team as a co-moderator. Contributions from the community are also woven into the actual topic of the episode: For example, user comments from the previous month are selected according to often arbitrary categories, viewer questions are answered and a viewer's YouTube channel is “honored” with a subscription by the Walulis channel.

Since the start of the sister channel, Walulis Daily, some of the above-mentioned figures and elements - such as the Assi, the homeless person and the Birnbaum Institute - have disappeared, and the various authors and editors of the show appear primarily as themselves in the recordings.

== Success ==
The channel earns over 3,5 million views per month in 2020. The videos are often in the trends of YouTube. The channel was rewarded from the journal Quotenmeter with the television prize in the category "Bester Web-Channel" (eng. best web channel).
