= Bundesfighter II Turbo =

2017 Browser video game

- Developer: Colour Colliders
- Publisher: funk
- Director: Schlecky Silberstein
- Designer: Nino Werner
- Programmer: Athos Kele
- Engine: Unity
- Platforms: Browser; MacOS; Windows
- Release: Browser, MacOS, Windows: WW: September 21, 2017
- Genre: Fighting
- Modes: single-player, multiplayer

Bundesfighter II Turbo (lit. 'Federal Fighter II Turbo') is a parody fighting game, developed by Austrian studio Colour Colliders on behalf of German satire format Browser Ballet and published by funk in 2017. While drawing inspiration from Capcom's Street Fighter II Turbo, it features stages and characters based on caricatures of the leading candidates of the 2017 German federal election.

The browser game gained notoriety when the public prosecutor's office in Stuttgart refused to investigate the game for its use of the swastika, leading to a rekindling of the debate on the ban of unconstitutional symbols in German video games as well as the definition of video games as an art form, ending in a reform of the USK's ruleset.

== Gameplay ==
Playing like a traditional 16-bit fighting game, the aim of the game is to have two characters face off against each other. Different characters have different attacks, serving as a means to deplete the opponent's health bar. Like in the Street Fighter series, these attacks consist of unique light and heavy attacks with a jumping and ducking variation each, in addition to special attacks which require a filled "power bar" to activate. Furthermore, each character has their own home stage, based on real-life locations.

Players can choose between a story mode, where they have to face off against a series of CPU-controlled opponents on a set path, or a versus mode, in which human players take control of both fighters.

== Characters ==
The playable cast of Bundesfighter II Turbo consist of satirical depictions of the leading candidates of the 2017 German federal election, representing the CDU, SPD, Left, FDP, AfD and A90/Greens parties.

- Merkel: Then-serving federal chancellor and leading candidate of CDU. She is depicted as a lizard person (in reference to the Reptilian conspiracy theory), which is why the majority of her attacks consist of hits with her tail and tongue, whereas her special attacks have her summoning former federal chancellor Helmut Kohl or a literal wave of refugees. Her stage is based on the German Chancellery in Berlin.
- Schulz: Portrayed as a muscular, roller-skating saint, SPD's candidate mainly fights by kicking or beating his opponents with a club wrapped in an imperial armband (referencing the German expression "to swing the Nazi club", meaning to accuse someone of far-right ideologies as a discrediting tactic). While one of his special attacks is based on Street Fighter's Shoryuken, the other has him transforming into the "MEGA-Schulz hype train", based on an internet meme that put Schulz at the center of an ironic cult of personality, intending to mock then-US president Donald Trump's MAGA politics. This meme is also represented in Schulz's home stage, which takes place during a SPD party meeting in Würselen.
- Wagenknecht: Being the leading candidate of The Left, her moveset contains - among some ordinary kicks - hits and slashes with a hammer and sickle as well as a Pioniergruß. For her special attack, a Berlin Wall watchtower marked with a Circle-A sprouts from the ground. She is fought in front of the Karl Marx Monument in Chemnitz (called Karl-Marx-Stadt in-game).
- Lindner: While his special attacks consist of him poking his opponents with a selfie stick or transforming into a locust (in reference to the Heuschreckendebatte, a controversy surrounding German politician Franz Müntefering's comparison of international equity traders to a plague of locusts), the majority of his moves satirise the FDP's stigma as a "rich man's party". This is expressed via his use of golf clubs and champagne bottles as weapons, the advertisement of Thermomix in his post-battle lines, and his home stage being the rooftop bar of a Frankfurt skyscraper.
- Gauland: As the leading candidate of the AfD, his moveset consists mostly of punches, kicks, and pokes with his nose, which he can extend in a similar way to Pinocchio. Additionally, one of his special attacks has him use a garden gnome as a projectile in a similar manner to Street Fighter's Hadouken, while he transforms into a German Dachshund for the other. The duel against him takes place during a Pegida demonstration at the Neumarkt in Dresden.
- Özdehardt: The candidate duo of Alliance 90/The Greens, Cem Özdemir and Katrin Göring-Eckardt, has been combined into this game's only joke character. Both are stuck together in an organic waste bin and can only punch themselves in the face. Their stage is a Waldorf school in Freiburg.

== Reception ==
Shortly after release, Bundesfighter II Turbo received generally favourable reviews.

Spiegel Netzwelt described the game as a "stripped-down version of 'Street Fighter'", which "is quite fun", but criticized one of Merkel's special attacks, which has her summoning Helmut Kohl as an angel falling from heaven as a projectile, as "macabre", due to him passing away only three months before the game's release. Ghacks Technology News praised the game's humour, while acknowledging that its appeal was mostly limited to "gamers who follow German politics". Eurogamer recommended Bundesfighter II Turbo to all those, who "want to get at least some fun, entertainment and aggression from this election campaign". Quick-Save.de noted that this officially non-monetised title effectively cost €17.50 (the broadcasting fee in Germany at that time) to play, due to the game's development being entirely financed by Germany's public-law broadcasting, but closed by stating: "Despite the minor control issues, this game finally delivers a true election campaign, just as the player deserves“.

=== Swastika controversy ===
Execution of the described attack

The jumping variation of playable character Gauland's heavy attack has the far-right politician contort his limbs in a way that make his entire body look like a swastika.

As a browser game, Bundesfighter II Turbo is not subject to the USK's approval before release, which is why a member of the VDVC (Association for Germany's video and computer players) only filed a complaint with the public prosecutor's office in Berlin after its launch, alleging a violation of Section 86a of the German Criminal Code. This section contains a ban on the use of symbols of unconstitutional organisations, including those of the NSDAP, such as the swastika. The ban extends to most media as well, with only pieces whose primary purpose is to serve as art or education being exempt from it. That exemption, known as the Sozialadäquanzklausel (lit.: social adequacy clause), is usually applied to most movies, books or paintings, but was deemed as not applicable to video games, when the Oberlandesgericht of Frankfurt ruled in a 1998 case concerning Wolfenstein 3D, that video games can neither be art nor educational material.

Serving as precedent, this ruling lead to a multitude of video games with historical settings being only ever available either as a heavily censored version or entirely banned in Germany (see List of banned video games by country#Germany). This remained unchanged, even after the Bundesverband Interaktive Unterhaltungssoftware (lit.: Federal Association of interactive entertainment software) was admitted to the German Cultural Council in 2008, officially recognising video games as art in Germany. This was only acknowledged ten years later, when the public prosecutor's office in Stuttgart refused to investigate Bundesfighter II Turbo for its use of the swastika, claiming it to be a piece of art and thus exempt of Section 86a. In addition, the public prosecutor's office noted in its official reasoning: "In technical literature, the 1998 ruling of the OLG Frankfurt is considered outdated.“

Despite this decision not setting a new precedent, as a response to the controversy, the USK updated their ruleset on August 9, 2018. The revision saw a change concerning the application of the Sozialadäquanzklausel, making it so, instead of categorically denying video games the definition of art or educational material and thus the admission of the use of symbols of unconstitutional organisations, now it is up to the USK to decide on a case-by-case basis.

Silberstein, head of Browser Ballet and initiator of Bundesfighter II Turbo's development, claimed the game's main purpose was to raise political interest amongst young voters and denied the existence of national socialist symbolism in the game, saying: "That's no swastika, it's merely a jumping attack."
