= Act of the Re-Establishment of the State of Lithuania =

1990 declaration of independence from the Soviet Union by Lithuania

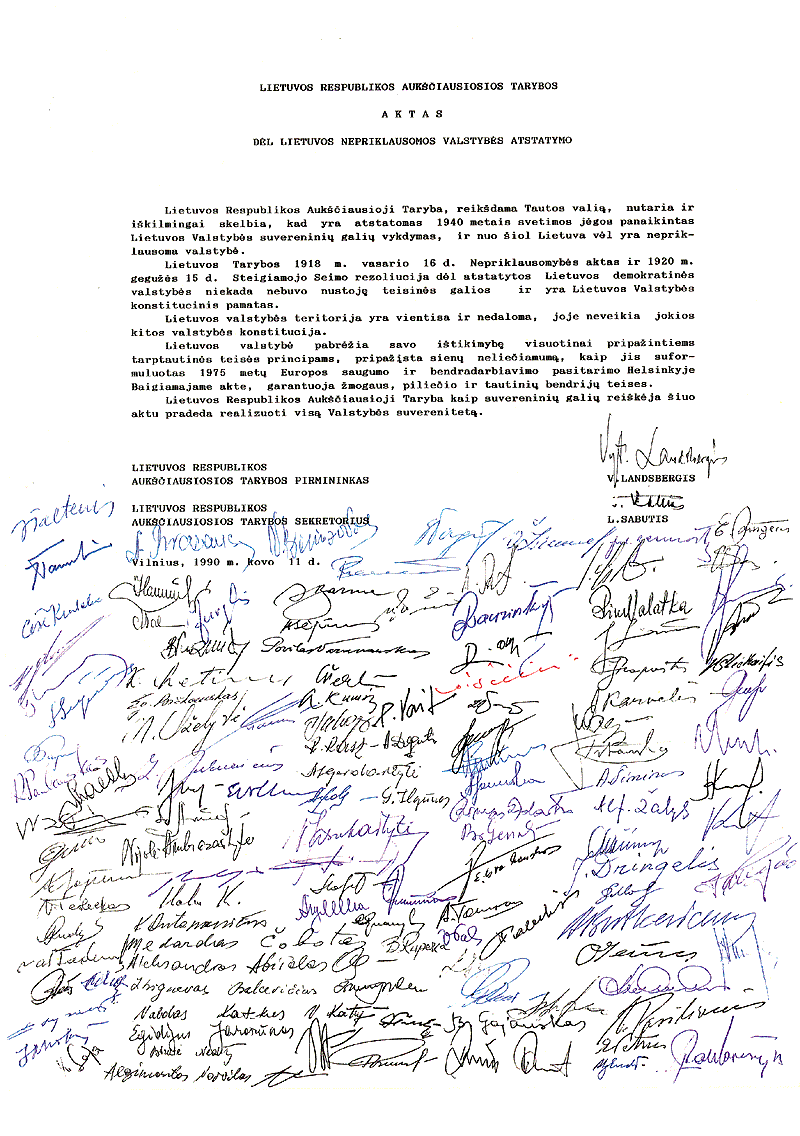
- Act of the Re-Establishment of the State of Lithuania with signatures of the delegates
- Original title: Lithuanian: Aktas dėl Lietuvos nepriklausomos valstybės atstatymo
- Created: 11 March 1990
- Ratified: 11 March 1990
- Location: Archives of the Seimas of the Republic of Lithuania
- Author: Vytautas Landsbergis
- Signatories: 124 members of the Supreme Council of the Republic of Lithuania
- Purpose: Declaration of independence

Full text
- Act of the Re-Establishment of the State of Lithuania at Wikisource

The Act of the Re-Establishment of the State of Lithuania or Act of 11 March (Lithuanian: Aktas dėl Lietuvos nepriklausomos valstybės atstatymo) was an independence declaration by Lithuania adopted on 11 March 1990, signed by all members of the Supreme Council of the Republic of Lithuania led by Sąjūdis. The act emphasized restoration and legal continuity of the interwar-period Lithuania, which was occupied by the Soviet Union and annexed in June 1940. In March 1990, it was the first of the 15 Soviet republics to declare independence, with the rest following to continue for 21 months, concluding with Kazakhstan's independence in 1991. These events (part of the broader process dubbed the "parade of sovereignties") led to the dissolution of the Soviet Union in December 1991.

== Background ==
=== Loss of independence ===
After the partitions of the Polish–Lithuanian Commonwealth in the 18th century, Lithuania was part of the Russian Empire. In the aftermath of the Russian Revolution of 1917, the Council of Lithuania, chaired by Jonas Basanavičius, proclaimed the Act of Independence of Lithuania on 16 February 1918. Lithuania enjoyed independence for two decades. In August 1939, the Soviet Union and Nazi Germany signed the Molotov–Ribbentrop Pact dividing Eastern Europe into spheres of influence. The Baltic states (Lithuania, Latvia, and Estonia) were assigned to the Soviet sphere of influence and subsequently were occupied in June 1940 and converted into soviet socialist republics.

In Lithuania's case, President Antanas Smetona left the country rather than accept the occupation. He did not resign but turned over his presidential duties to Prime Minister Antanas Merkys as per the constitution. The next day, Merkys declared himself president in his own right. The cabinet confirmed Merkys in office, claiming that Smetona had effectively resigned by leaving the country.

Two days later, under Soviet pressure, Merkys appointed Justas Paleckis, a left-wing journalist and longtime opponent of the Smetona regime, as prime minister. Merkys then resigned at Moscow's insistence, making Paleckis acting president as well. The Soviets then used the Paleckis government to give the final Soviet takeover the appearance of legality.

The Paleckis government staged a heavily rigged election for a "People's Seimas," in which voters were presented with a single Communist-dominated list. The newly elected People's Seimas met on 21 July with only one piece of business–a resolution declaring Lithuania a Soviet republic and petitioning for admission to the Soviet Union, which carried unanimously. The Soviet Union duly "approved" the request on 3 August. Since then, Soviet sources have maintained that Lithuania's petition to join the Soviet Union marked the culmination of a Lithuanian socialist revolution, and thus represented the legitimate desire of the Lithuanian people to join the Soviet Union.

The Soviet authorities undertook Sovietization policies: nationalization of all private property, collectivization of agriculture, suppression of the Catholic Church, and the imposition of totalitarian control. At the same time, free education and free national health system were also introduced. The armed anti-Soviet partisans were liquidated by 1953. Approximately 130,000 Lithuanians, dubbed "enemies of the people", were deported into Siberia (see Soviet deportations from Lithuania). After the death of Joseph Stalin in 1953, the Soviet Union adopted de-Stalinization policies and ended mass persecutions. Nonviolent resistance continued both in Lithuania and among the Lithuanian diaspora. These movements were secret, illegal, and more focused on social issues, human rights, and cultural affairs rather than political demands.

=== Independence movements ===
Map of the Eastern Bloc

As Mikhail Gorbachev attempted to revive the economy of the Soviet Union, he introduced glasnost (openness) and perestroika (restructuring).

Gorbachev's political agenda went for great and deep changes within the Soviet government, as such, Gorbachev invited the Soviet public into open and public discussions unseen before.

For the Soviet Lithuanian dissidents and activists, it was an opportunity not to be missed, to bring their movements from underground into the public life.

On 23 August 1987 (the 48th anniversary of the Molotov–Ribbentrop Pact), the Lithuanian Liberty League organized the first public protest rally that did not result in arrests.

Encouraged by the non-arrests, by mid-1988, a group of 35 intellectuals organized the Sąjūdis Reform Movement with the original goal of supporting, discussing, and implementing Gorbachev's reforms yet short of openly supporting independence from the USSR.

However, Sąjūdis grew in popularity, attracting large crowds to rallies in Vingis Park and therefore radicalizing its agenda, taking advantage of Gorbachev's passiveness.

In 1989, Sąjūdis, not afraid of angering Moscow and causing a violent crackdown, continuously pushed further with its demands: from limited discussions on Gorbachev's reforms, to demand greater say in economic decisions, to political autonomy within the Soviet Union.

By the time of the Baltic Way, a human chain spanning over 600 kilometres (370 mi) across the three Baltic states to mark the 50th anniversary of the Molotov–Ribbentrop Pact, the official goal of Sąjūdis was now independence for Lithuania.

Similar processes happened in other Soviet republics during 1988–1991, collectively known as the "parade of sovereignties", which were the major factor contributing to the collapse of the Soviet Union.

== Democratic election ==
Parliamentary elections of February 1990 were the first free and democratic elections in Lithuania since 1926. The voters overwhelmingly voted for the candidates endorsed by Sąjūdis, even though the movement did not run as a political party. The result was the first post-war non-communist government. During its first assembly on 11 March 1990, the Supreme Soviet of the Lithuanian SSR elected Vytautas Landsbergis as its chairman and restored Lithuania's prewar name of the Republic of Lithuania. It then changed its name to the Supreme Council of the Republic of Lithuania, and formally declared the re-establishment of Lithuanian independence. The act was approved at 10:44 pm by 124 members of the council while six abstained. There were no votes against.

== The Act ==
SUPREME COUNCIL OF THE REPUBLIC OF LITHUANIA

ACT

On the Re-establishment of the State of Lithuania

The Supreme Council of the Republic of Lithuania, expressing the will of the nation, decrees and solemnly proclaims that the execution of the sovereign powers of the State of Lithuania abolished by foreign forces in 1940, is re-established, and henceforth Lithuania is again an independent state.

The Act of Independence of 16 February 1918 of the Council of Lithuania and the Constituent Assembly decree of 15 May 1920 on the re-established democratic State of Lithuania never lost their legal effect and comprise the constitutional foundation of the State of Lithuania.

The territory of Lithuania is whole and indivisible, and the constitution of no other State is valid on it.

The State of Lithuania stresses its adherence to universally recognized principles of international law, recognizes the principle of inviolability of borders as formulated in the Final Act of the Conference on Security and Co-operation in Europe in Helsinki in 1975, and guarantees human, civil, and ethnic community rights.

The Supreme Council of the Republic of Lithuania, expressing sovereign power, by this Act begins to realize the complete sovereignty of the state.

The Supreme Council took the line that Lithuania's original declaration of independence in 1918 was still valid, and considered the Act to be a reassertion of an independence that still legally existed under international law. It was based on the premise that Smetona never resigned, and Merkys' takeover of the presidency was illegal and unconstitutional. Lithuania's official position on the matter since then has been that all subsequent acts leading up to the Soviet annexation were ipso facto void.

== Aftermath ==
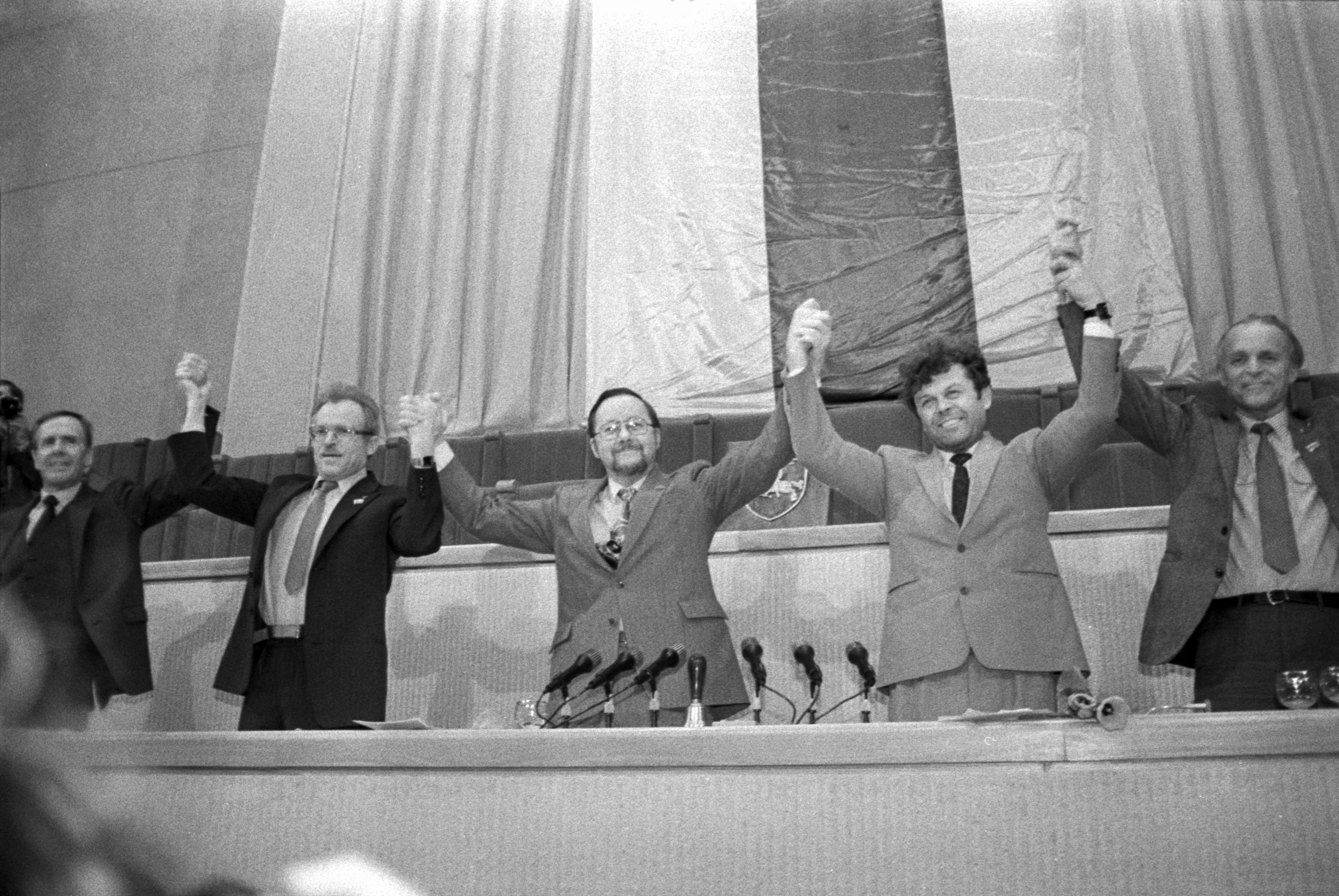
Leaders of the Supreme Council of Lithuania on 11 March 1990, after the promulgation of the Act of the Re-Establishment of the State of Lithuania

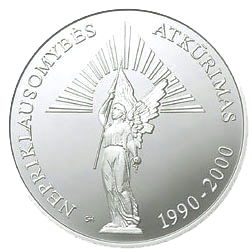
Litas commemorative coin dedicated to the 10th anniversary of Independence

The Act of the Re-Establishment of the State of Lithuania served as a model and inspiration to other Soviet republics. However, the issue of independence was not immediately settled and recognition by other countries was not certain.

Mikhail Gorbachev called the Act of Independence illegal and the USSR demanded revocation of the Act and began applying sanctions against Lithuania including an economic blockade. In addition, on 13 January 1991 Soviet forces stormed the LRT building in Vilnius along with the Vilnius TV Tower.

Unarmed civilian Lithuanians confronted Soviet soldiers. Fourteen people were killed and seven hundred injured in what became known as the January Events.

On 31 May 1990 the Supreme Soviet of Moldavian SSR voted to recognize the Restoration of the Independence of Lithuania. The Parliament of Moldavia was the first legislature in the world to recognize Lithuania's independence, although Moldavia was still part of the Soviet Union. The Moldavian Supreme Soviet promised to establish an embassy to Lithuania in the near future.

On 13 January 1991, as Soviet forces stormed the LRT building in Vilnius, Russian leader Boris Yeltsin arrived in Tallinn, and with the leaders of the Baltic countries he signed a joint declaration, recognising one another's independence/sovereignty. Later, on 27 July 1991, the Russian government re-recognized Lithuania and the two countries re-established diplomatic relations on 9 October 1991.

On 11 February 1991 the Icelandic parliament voted to confirm that Iceland's 1922 recognition of Lithuanian independence was still in full effect, as it never formally recognized the Soviet Union's control over Lithuania, and that full diplomatic relations should be established as soon as possible. In response, the Soviet Union recalled its ambassador to Iceland. Iceland was later followed by Denmark, Slovenia, Croatia (then constituent republics of Yugoslavia), and Latvia. Denmark's ambassador to Lithuania arrived on 26 August; he was the first foreign diplomat accredited to Lithuania after its declaration of independence.

On 26 August 1991 Lithuanian border guards were posted at border crossings between Lithuania and Russia, and the Republic of Lithuania began issuing visas. The first visas were issued to members of the Lithuanian Opera Company, a Chicago-based group of Americans of Lithuanian descent who had arrived to perform for three weeks in the country. At first, citizens of the Soviet Union and anyone with a visa for the Soviet Union automatically qualified for a visa upon arrival to Lithuania; later, the country instituted its own visa rules.

After the failed August Coup, Lithuanian independence recognition was reconfirmed by the United States on 2 September. President George H. W. Bush announced that if the Soviet Union were to use armed force against Lithuania, the U.S. would react accordingly. Bush's administration said that he had been waiting to recognize Lithuanian independence until the Supreme Soviet of the Soviet Union did so first, but Bush later decided he could not wait any longer.

Finally, on 6 September 1991 Lithuania's independence was recognized by the State Council of the Soviet Union. Its recognition of Lithuania's independence was quickly followed by several countries including China, India, and Belarus as well as Turkmenistan and Uzbekistan.

On 17 September 1991 the United Nations admitted Lithuania as a member. On the same day, the United Nations also admitted Estonia, Latvia, Marshall Islands, the Federated States of Micronesia, North Korea, and South Korea as members.

On 29 March 2004 Lithuania became a member of NATO. On 1 May 2004 Lithuania also became a member of the European Union. The country banned displays of Soviet and Nazi symbols in 2008.

Chronology of recognition of the Re-Establishment of the State of Lithuania
Date	Country
31 May 1990	Moldavia
11 February 1991	Iceland
28 February 1991	Denmark
16 May 1991	Slovenia
27 July 1991	Russian SFSR
3 August 1991	Croatia
23 August 1991	Latvia
24 August 1991	Norway
24 August 1991	Hungary
25 August 1991	Argentina
25 August 1991	France
26 August 1991	Bulgaria
26 August 1991	Italy
26 August 1991	Canada
26 August 1991	Poland
26 August 1991	Malta
26 August 1991	Portugal
26 August 1991	Romania
26 August 1991	San Marino
26 August 1991	Ukraine
27 August 1991	Albania
27 August 1991	Australia
27 August 1991	Belgium
27 August 1991	United Kingdom
27 August 1991	Georgia
27 August 1991	Spain
27 August 1991	Luxembourg
27 August 1991	Sweden
27 August 1991	Germany
27 August 1991	Ireland
27 August 1991	Estonia
28 August 1991	Austria
28 August 1991	Chile
28 August 1991	New Zealand
28 August 1991	South Africa
28 August 1991	Finland
28 August 1991	Switzerland
28 August 1991	Uruguay
29 August 1991	Czechoslovakia
29 August 1991	Mongolia
30 August 1991	Vatican City
31 August 1991	Kyrgyzstan
2 September 1991	Ecuador
2 September 1991	Netherlands
2 September 1991	United States
3 September 1991	Greece
3 September 1991	Libya
3 September 1991	Nicaragua
3 September 1991	Turkey
4 September 1991	Brazil
4 September 1991	Israel
4 September 1991	Tunisia
5 September 1991	South Korea
5 September 1991	Mexico
6 September 1991	Guinea
6 September 1991	Japan
6 September 1991	Colombia
6 September 1991	Singapore
6 September 1991	Egypt
6 September 1991	Soviet Union
7 September 1991	Afghanistan
7 September 1991	China
7 September 1991	North Korea
7 September 1991	Peru
7 September 1991	Senegal
7 September 1991	Bangladesh
8 September 1991	Pakistan
9 September 1991	Bolivia
9 September 1991	India
9 September 1991	Cuba
9 September 1991	Syria
9 September 1991	Thailand
9 September 1991	Vietnam
9 September 1991	Cape Verde
10 September 1991	Azerbaijan
10 September 1991	Iran
10 September 1991	Nepal
11 September 1991	Madagascar
12 September 1991	Armenia
12 September 1991	Cyprus
13 September 1991	Yemen
15 September 1991	Bahrain
15 September 1991	Jordan
15 September 1991	Kuwait
15 September 1991	Philippines
16 September 1991	Saudi Arabia
17 September 1991	Indonesia
19 September 1991	United Arab Emirates
20 September 1991	Laos
24 September 1991	Turkmenistan
25 September 1991	Panama
30 September 1991	Uzbekistan
30 September 1991	Namibia
22 October 1991	Mauritania
22 October 1991	Yugoslavia
2 November 1991	Sri Lanka
23 December 1991	Ghana
23 December 1991	Kazakhstan
24 December 1991	Mozambique
25 December 1991	Tajikistan
27 December 1991	Algeria
27 December 1991	Belarus
30 December 1991	Lebanon
2 January 1992	Iraq
6 January 1992	Burundi
16 January 1992	Burkina Faso
25 January 1992	Mali
31 January 1992	Benin
21 February 1992	Costa Rica
17 March 1992	Zimbabwe
25 September 1992	El Salvador
6 November 1992	Bosnia and Herzegovina
10 November 1992	Nigeria
12 January 1993	Chad

== See also ==
- Act of Independence of Lithuania, the Act of 16 February 1918
- On the Restoration of Independence of the Republic of Latvia – A similar Act in the Latvian SSR
- Estonian Restoration of Independence – A similar act in the Estonian SSR
- State continuity of the Baltic states
