= January Events =

1991 violent confrontations between Lithuanian civilians and Soviet military

January Events Lithuanian: Sausio įvykiai
- Part of the Revolutions of 1989, the Singing Revolution, and the Dissolution of the Soviet Union
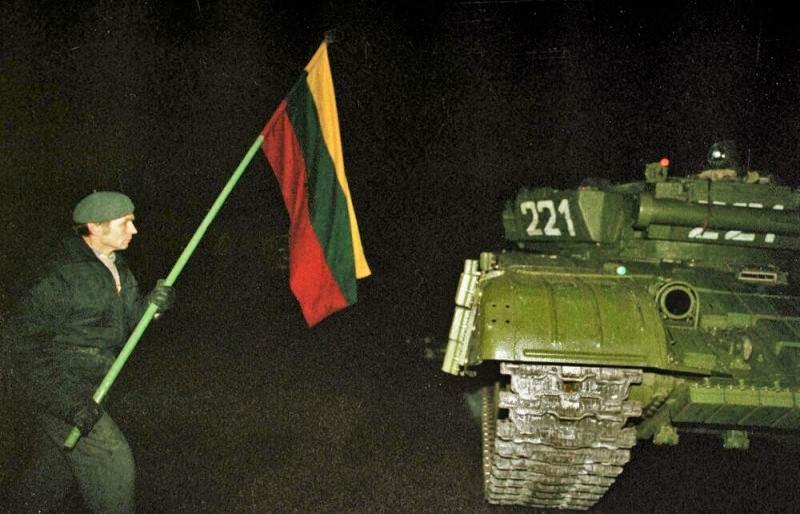
- A man with a Lithuanian flag in front of a Soviet tank, 13 January 1991
Date	11–13 January 1991
Location	Lithuania
Result	Lithuanian victory: Soviet forces withdraw from the cities; Lithuanian statehood preserved

Belligerents
Lithuania; Department of National Defense; Lithuanian Riflemen's Union	Soviet Union; Soviet Armed Forces; 76th Airborne Division; KGB; Alpha Group; OMON; (Lithuanian Soviet Socialist Republic) National Salvation Committee of the Lithuanian SSR

Commanders and leaders
(Lithuania) Vytautas Landsbergis (Lithuania) Albertas Šimėnas (AWOL) (Lithuania) Gediminas Vagnorius (Lithuania) Audrius Butkevičius	(Soviet Union) Mikhail Gorbachev (Soviet Union) Vladislav Achalov (Lithuanian Soviet Socialist Republic) Mykolas Burokevičius

Casualties and losses
14 civilians killed 1 civilian died due to heart attack 702 injured	1 KGB soldier (friendly fire)

The January Events (Lithuanian: Sausio įvykiai) were a series of violent confrontations between the civilian population of Lithuania, supporting independence, and the Soviet Armed Forces. The events took place between 11 and 13 January 1991, after the restoration of independence by Lithuania. As a result of the Soviet military actions, 14 civilians were killed and over 140 were injured as they peacefully protested for freedom in what is known as the Vilnius massacre. The 13 January was the most violent day of the month in Lithuania and this was the bloodiest act of repression by Soviet forces since the April 9 tragedy. The events were primarily centered in the capital city Vilnius, but Soviet military activity and confrontations also occurred elsewhere in the country, including Alytus, Šiauliai, Varėna, and Kaunas.

The 13 January is the Day of the Defenders of Freedom (Lithuanian: Laisvės Gynėjų Diena) in Lithuania and it is officially observed as a commemorative day.

== Background ==
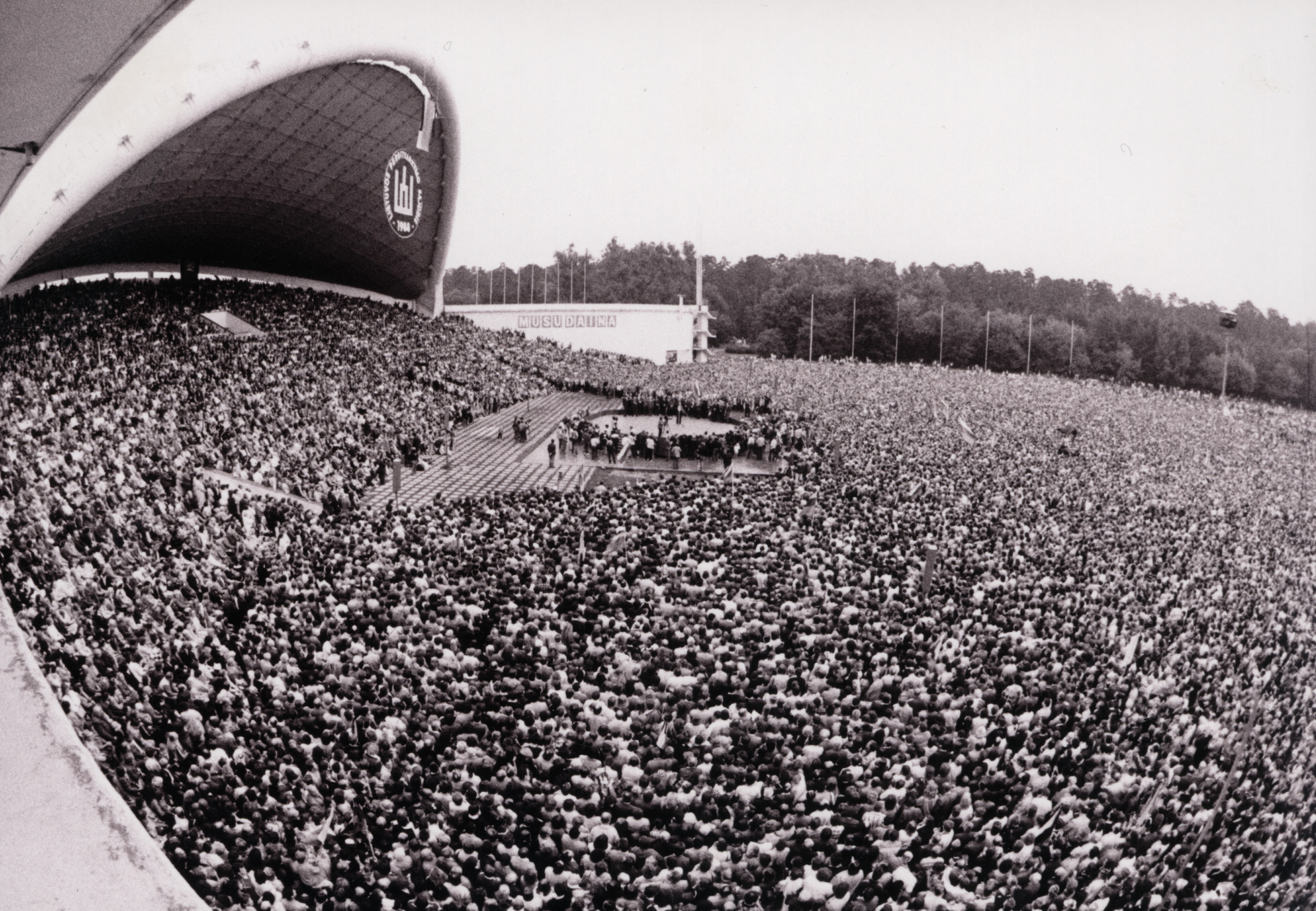
A rally in Vingis Park to commemorate and condemn the Molotov–Ribbentrop Pact in 1988, organized by Sąjūdis

The Baltic states, including Lithuania, were forcibly annexed by the Soviet Union in 1940. The illegal occupation was never recognized by Western powers, leading to the Baltic states' continuity.

The Republic of Lithuania declared independence from the Soviet Union on 11 March 1990 and thereafter underwent a difficult period of emergence. During March–April 1990, the Soviet Airborne Troops (VDV) occupied buildings of the Political Education and the Higher Party School where the alternative Communist Party of Lithuania, on the CPSU platform, later encamped.

The Soviet Union imposed an economic blockade between April and late June. Economic and energy shortages undermined public faith in the newly restored state. The inflation rate reached 100% and continued to increase rapidly. In January 1991, the Lithuanian government was forced to raise prices several times and this was used for organization of mass protests of the so-called "Russophone population" of the country.

During the five days preceding the killings, Soviet, Polish, and other workers at Vilnius factories protested the government's consumer goods price hikes and what they saw as ethnic discrimination. According to Human Rights Watch, the Soviet government had mounted a propaganda campaign designed to further ethnic strife. This and other actions would give the Soviets a pretext for intervention when they later would send elite armed forces and special service units for the protection of the rallied Russophone population minority.

On 8 January, the conflict between Chairman of the Parliament Vytautas Landsbergis and the more pragmatic Prime Minister Kazimira Prunskienė culminated in her resignation. Prunskienė met with Soviet Union President Mikhail Gorbachev on that day. He refused her request for assurances that military action would not be taken.

On the same day, the pro-Moscow Yedinstvo movement organized a rally in front of the Supreme Council of Lithuania. Protesters tried to storm the parliament building but were driven away by unarmed security forces using water cannons. Despite a Supreme Council vote the same day to halt price increases, the scale of protests and provocations backed by Yedinstvo and the Communist Party increased. During a radio and television address, Landsbergis called upon independence supporters to gather around and protect the main governmental and infrastructural buildings.

From 8–9 January, several special Soviet military units were flown to Lithuania (including the counter-terrorism Alpha Group and paratroopers of the 76th Guards Air Assault Division of the VDV based at Pskov). The official explanation was that this was needed to ensure constitutional order and the effectiveness of laws of the Lithuanian SSR and the Soviet Union.

On 10 January, Gorbachev addressed the Supreme Council, demanding a restoration of the constitution of the USSR in Lithuania and the revocation of "all anti-constitutional laws". He mentioned that military intervention could be possible within days. When Lithuanian officials asked for Moscow's guarantee not to send armed troops, Gorbachev did not reply.

== Timeline of events ==
=== Friday 11 January 1991 ===
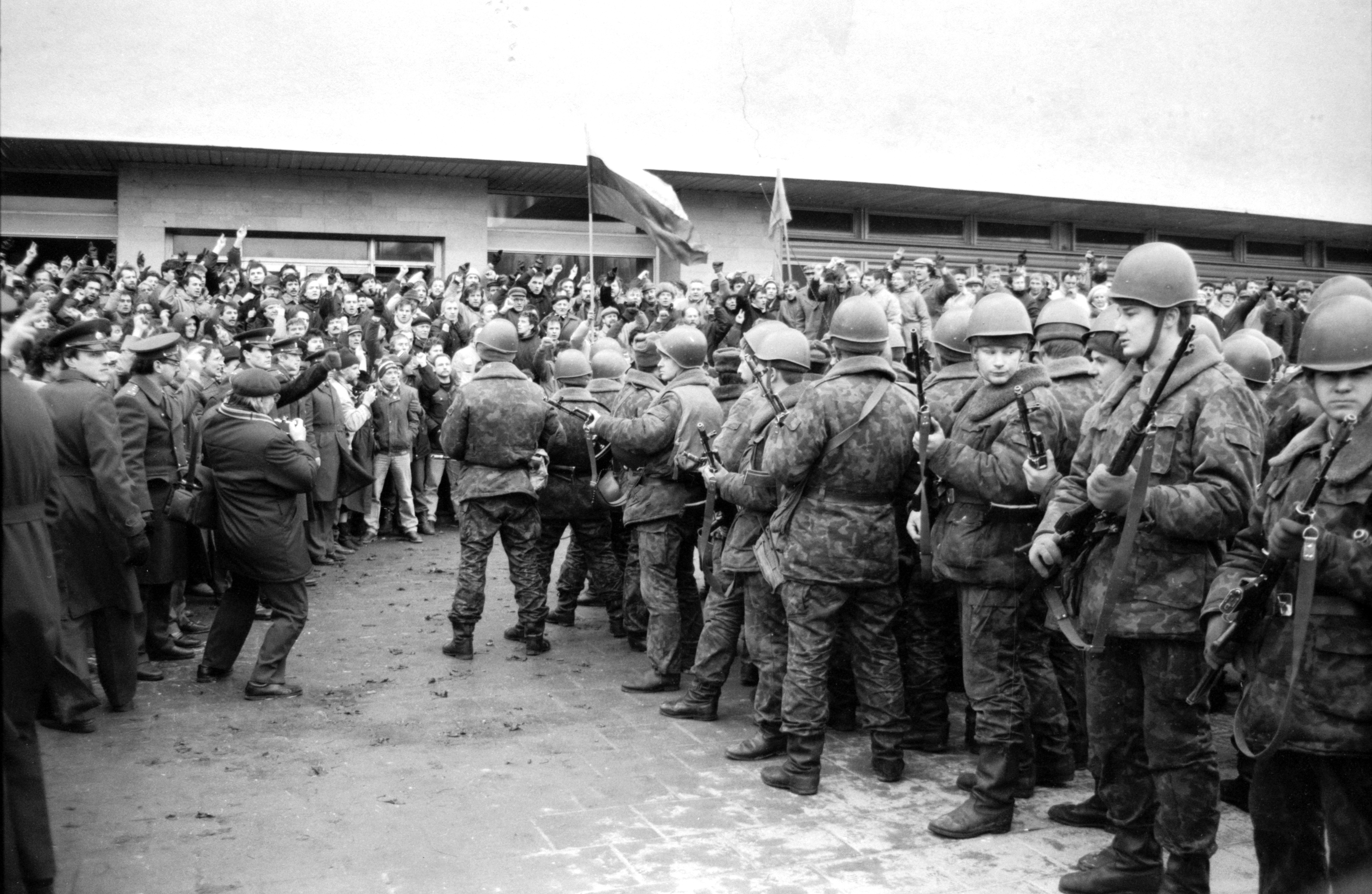
Unarmed civilians defend the Lithuanian Press House from Soviet Airborne Forces troopers, January 1991

In the morning, Landsbergis and Prime Minister Albertas Šimėnas were presented with another ultimatum from the "Democratic Congress of Lithuania" demanding that they comply with Gorbachev's request by 15:00 on 11 January.

- 11:50 – Soviet military units seize the National Defence Department building in Vilnius.
- 12:00 – Soviet military units surround and seize the Press House building in Vilnius. Soldiers use live ammunition against civilians. Several people are hospitalized, some with bullet wounds.
- 12:15 – Soviet paratroopers seize the regional building of the National Defence Department in Alytus.
- 12:30 – Soviet military units seize the regional building of the National Defence Department in Šiauliai.
- 15:00 – In a press conference held in the building of the Central Committee of the Communist Party of Lithuania, the head of the Ideological Division Juozas Jermalavičius announces the creation of the "National Salvation Committee of Lithuanian SSR" and that from now on, it will be the only legitimate government in Lithuania.
- 16:40 – Minister of Foreign Affairs Algirdas Saudargas sends a diplomatic note to the Ministry of Foreign Affairs of the Soviet Union in which he expresses his concerns about Soviet army violence in Lithuania.
- 21:00 – Soviet military units seize a TV re-transmission center in Nemenčinė.
- 23:00 – Soviet military units seize the dispatcher's office of the Vilnius railway station. Railway traffic is disrupted but restored several hours later.

=== Saturday 12 January 1991 ===
During an overnight session of the Supreme Council, Speaker Landsbergis announced that he had tried to call Gorbachev three times, but was unsuccessful. Deputy Minister of Defense of the Soviet Union, General Vladislav Achalov, arrived in Lithuania and took control of all military operations. People from all over Lithuania started to encircle the main strategic buildings: the Supreme Council, the Radio and Television Committee, the Vilnius TV Tower, and the main telephone exchange.

- 00:30 – Soviet military units seize the base of the Lithuanian SSR Special Purpose Detachment of Police (OMON) in a suburb of Vilnius.
- 04:30 – Soviet military units unsuccessfully try to seize the Police Academy building in Vilnius.
- 11:20 – Armed Soviet soldiers attack a border-line post near Varėna.
- 14:00 – A Soviet military truck collides with a civilian vehicle in Kaunas. One person dies and three are hospitalized with serious injuries. Vilnius residents carry food to passengers in stalled trucks on strike.
- 22:00 – A column of Soviet military vehicles is spotted leaving a military base in Vilnius and moving towards the city centre. Employees of the Central Committee of the Communist Party of Lithuania instruct special worker groups (druzhinas) to be ready "for special events."
- 23:00 – An unknown group of individuals who claim to be part of the National Salvation Committee declare at the Supreme Council that it is their duty to take over Lithuania to avoid an economic meltdown and a fratricidal war.

=== Sunday 13 January 1991 ===
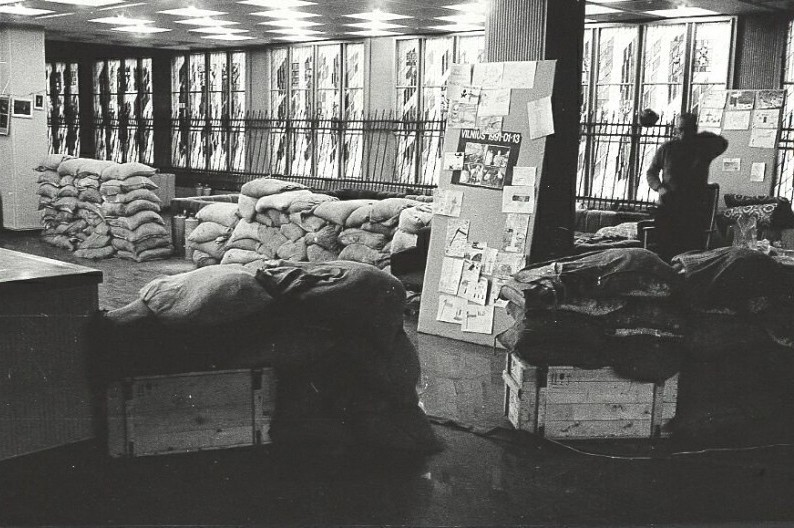
Preparation for the anticipated Soviet assault inside the parliament building, the Seimas Palace, 13 January.

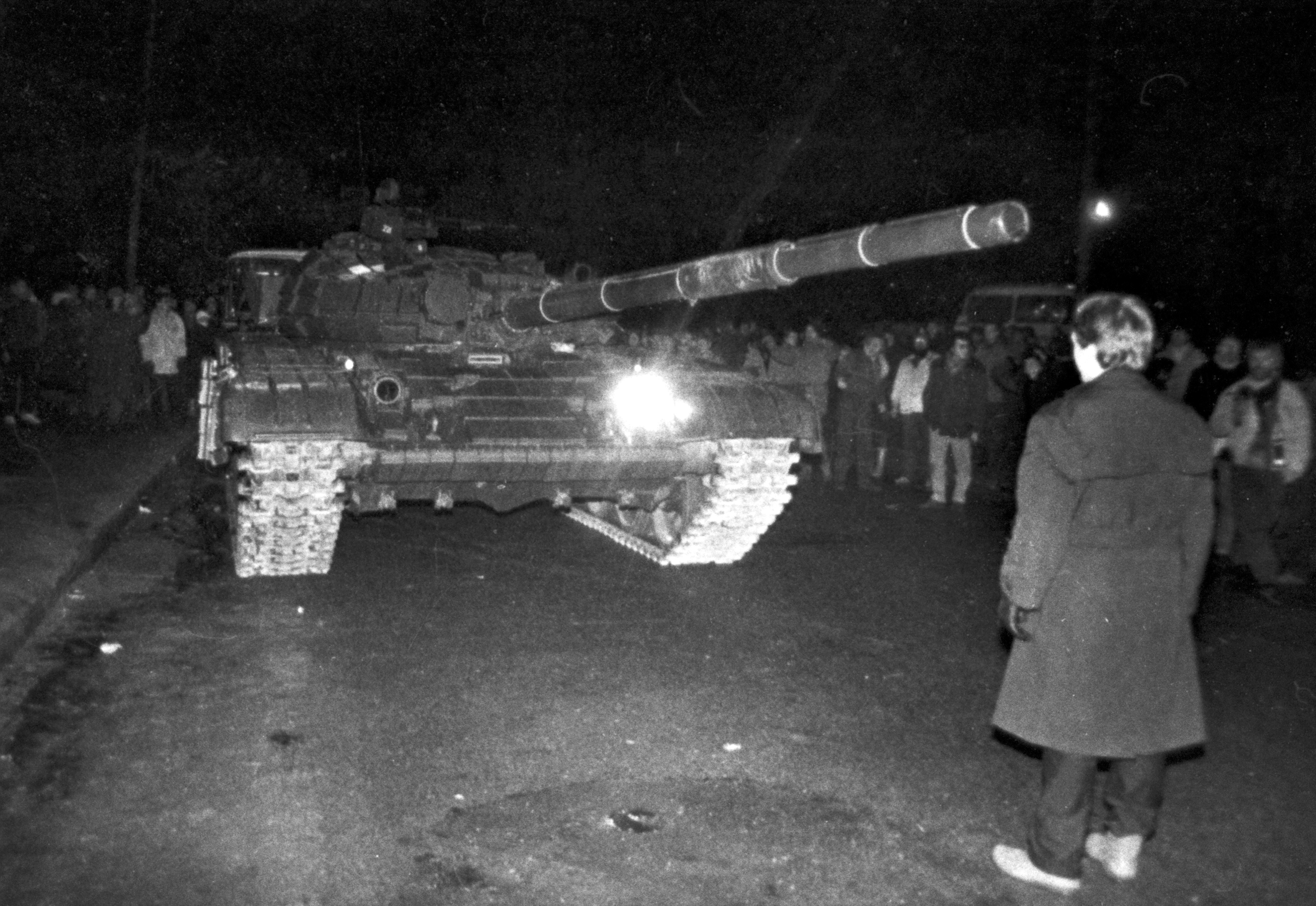
Unarmed Lithuanian citizen standing against a Soviet tank

- 00:00 – Another column of military vehicles (including tanks and BMPs) is spotted leaving the military base and heading toward the TV tower.
- 01:25 – Upon arrival in the vicinity of the TV tower, tanks start to fire blank rounds.
- 01:50 – Tanks and soldiers encircle the TV tower. Soldiers fire live ammunition overhead and into civilian crowds gathered around the building. Tanks drive straight through lines of people. Fourteen people are killed in the attack, most of them shot and two crushed by tanks. One Soviet Alfa unit member (Viktor Shatskikh) is killed by friendly fire. Loudspeakers on several BMPs transmit the voice of Juozas Jermalavičius: "Broliai lietuviai, nacionalistų ir separatistų vyriausybė, kuri priešpastatė save liaudžiai, nuversta. Eikite pas savo tėvus, vaikus!" ("Brother Lithuanians! The nationalist and separatist government, which confronted the people has been overthrown! Go [home] to your parents and children!")
- 02:00 – BMPs and tanks surround the Radio and Television Committee building. Soldiers fire live ammunition into the building, over the heads of the civilian crowds. The live television broadcast was hosted by Eglė Bučelytė and later terminated. The last pictures transmitted are of a Soviet soldiers running toward the camera and switching it off.
- 02:30 – A small TV studio from Kaunas came on air unexpectedly. A technician of the family program that usually broadcast from Kaunas once a week was on the air, calling for anyone who could help to broadcast to the world in as many different languages as possible about the Soviet army and tanks killing unarmed people in Lithuania. Within an hour, the studio was filled with several university professors broadcasting in several languages. The studio received a threatening phone call from the Soviet army division of Kaunas (possibly the 7th Guards Airborne Division of the VDV). The second phone call from the Soviet army division followed shortly, with a commander stating that "they would not try to take over the studio so long as no misinformation is given". This was all broadcast live. The Kaunas TV station was using Juragiai and Sitkūnai transmitters as retranslators.

Barricades around the parliament building, 1991.

Following these two attacks, large crowds (20,000 during the night, more than 50,000 in the morning) of independence supporters gathered around the Supreme Council building. People started building anti-tank barricades and setting up defences inside surrounding buildings. Provisional chapels were set up inside and outside the Supreme Council building. Members of the crowd prayed, sang, and shouted pro-independence slogans. Despite columns of military trucks, BMPs, and tanks moving into the vicinity of the Supreme Council, Soviet military forces retreated instead of attacking.

Among the members of the barricade were two basketball players who would later play for the Lithuanian national team, Gintaras Einikis and Alvydas Pazdrazdis.

== List of victims ==
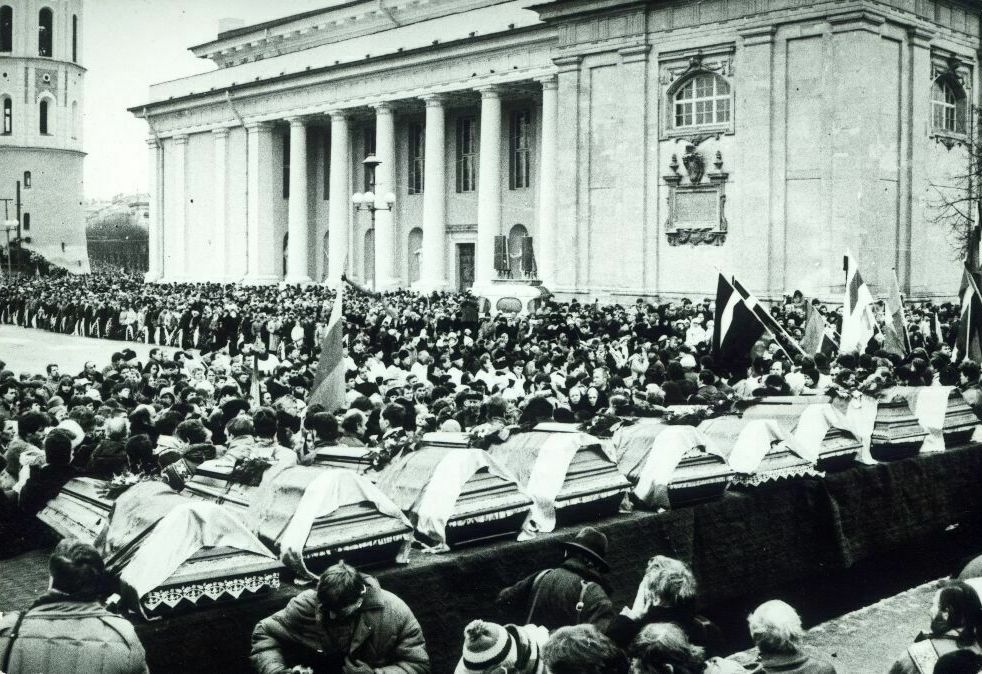
Burial ceremony of the victims

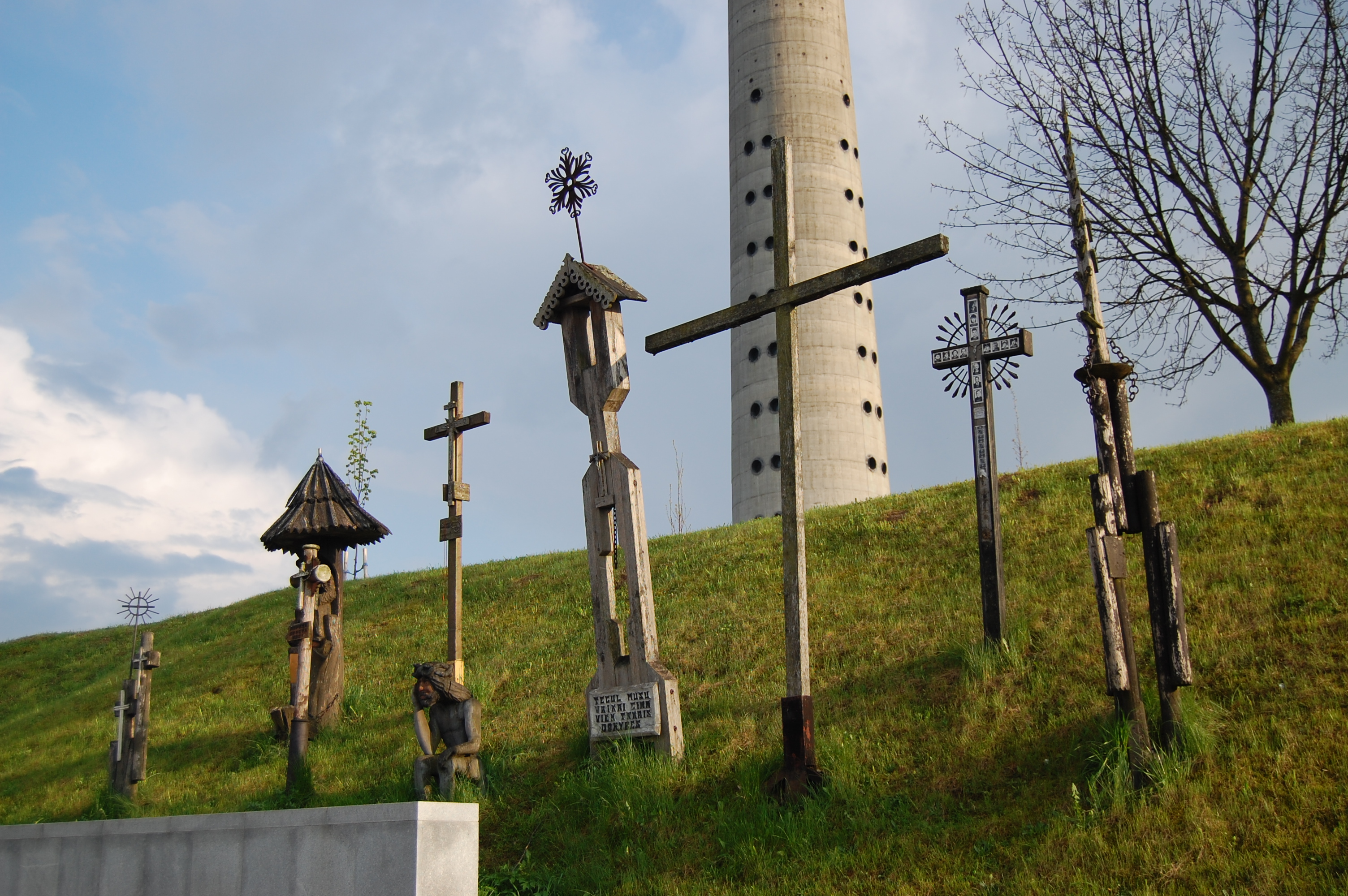
The memorial to the victims near the TV tower. The crosses have since been moved inside the TV tower.

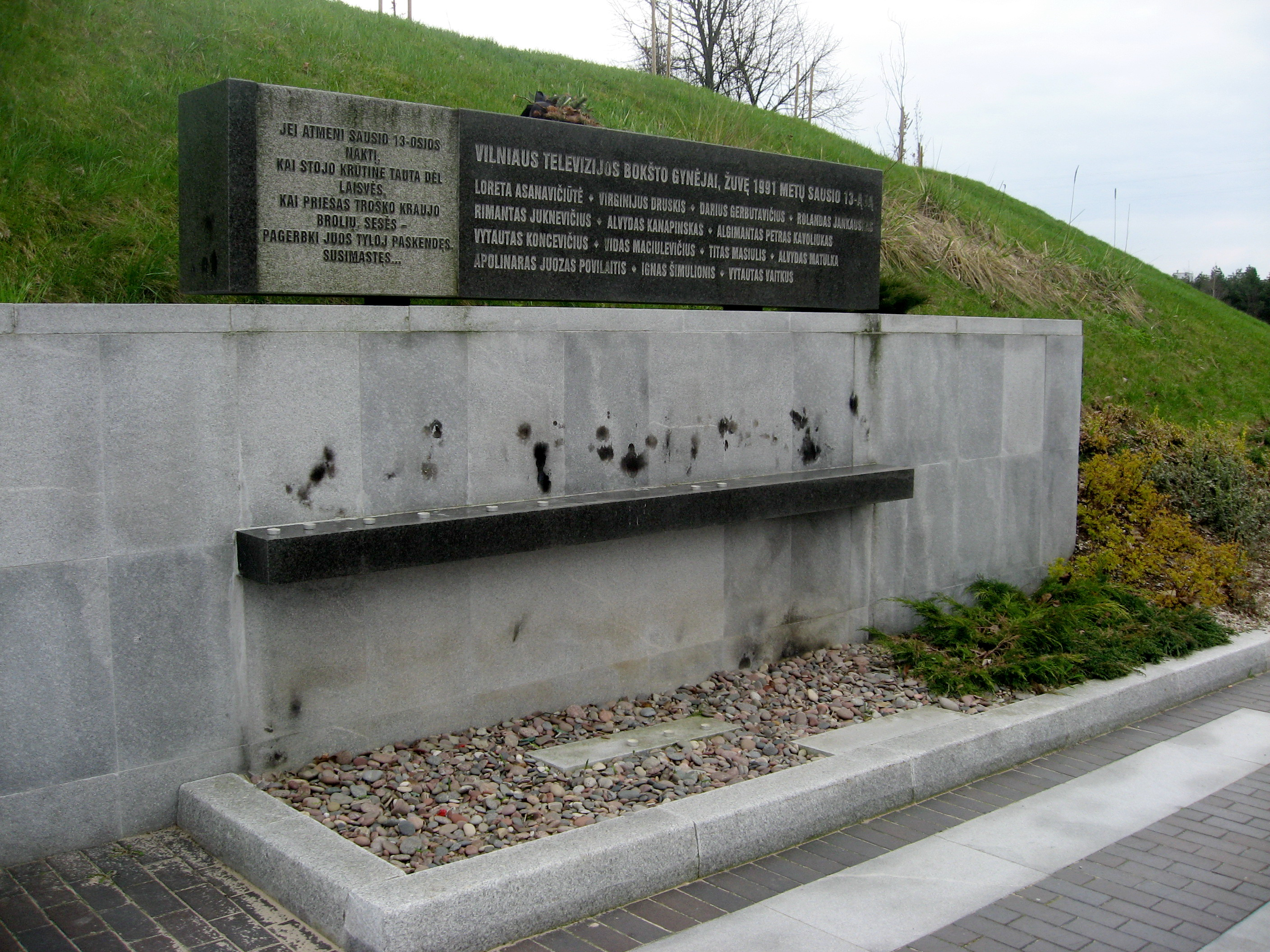
The memorial wall near the TV tower

In all, thirteen Lithuanians were killed by the Soviet army. An additional civilian died at the scene due to a heart attack, and one Soviet soldier was killed by friendly fire. All victims, except the Soviet soldier, were awarded the Order of the Cross of Vytis (the Knight) on 15 January 1991.

1. Loreta Asanavičiūtė (b. 1967) – the only female victim. Worked as a seamstress in a factory. Died in hospital after she fell under a tank. Noted for her shy character, she became the most famous victim.
2. Virginijus Druskis (b. 1969) – student at Kaunas University of Technology. Was shot in the chest.
3. Darius Gerbutavičius (b. 1973) – student at a vocational school. Was shot five times (legs, arms and back).
4. Rolandas Jankauskas (b. 1969) – student. He was hit in the face by an explosive device. His mother was a native Russian from Altai Krai.
5. Rimantas Juknevičius (b. 1966) – native of Marijampolė, senior at Kaunas University of Technology. He was shot.
6. Alvydas Kanapinskas (b. 1952) – worker at a Kėdainiai biochemical factory. He was shot.
7. Algimantas Petras Kavoliukas (b. 1939) – butcher at a grocery store. He was wounded by a rubber bullet on 11 January 1991, when he protested against the Soviet troops near the Press House. On 13 January, he was hit by a tank. According to some witnesses, he was the first victim killed that night.
8. Vytautas Koncevičius (b. 1941) – shopman. He was shot and died in the hospital about a month after the attacks. Had been deported to Siberia with his family in 1945.
9. Vidas Maciulevičius (b. 1966) – locksmith. Died from bullet wounds to the face, neck, and spine.
10. Titas Masiulis (b. 1962) – Kaunas resident who was shot in the chest.
11. Alvydas Matulka (b. 1955) – Rokiškis resident who died from a heart attack.
12. Apolinaras Juozas Povilaitis (b. 1937) – metalworker at a Lithuanian Academy of Sciences' institute. He died from bullet wounds to the heart, right lung, upper arm, and thigh.
13. Ignas Šimulionis (b. 1973) – high school student, a friend of Gerbutavičius. Was shot in the head.
14. Vytautas Vaitkus (b. 1943) – plumber at a meat plant. Died from bullet wounds to the chest.
15. Viktor Viktorovich Shatskikh (b. 1961) – Lieutenant Group 'A' Service Office MTO 7 of the KGB. Mortally wounded by a 5.45mm bullet passing through a slit in his body armour, which originated from a ricochet bullet shot by a fellow soldier inside the Lithuanian National Radio and Television building. He was awarded the Order of Red Banner posthumously.

12 of the 14 victims were buried in the Antakalnis Cemetery in Vilnius. Titas Masiulis was buried in Petrašiūnai Cemetery in his native Kaunas, and Rimantas Juknevičius was buried in the Marijampolė cemetery.

== Aftermath ==
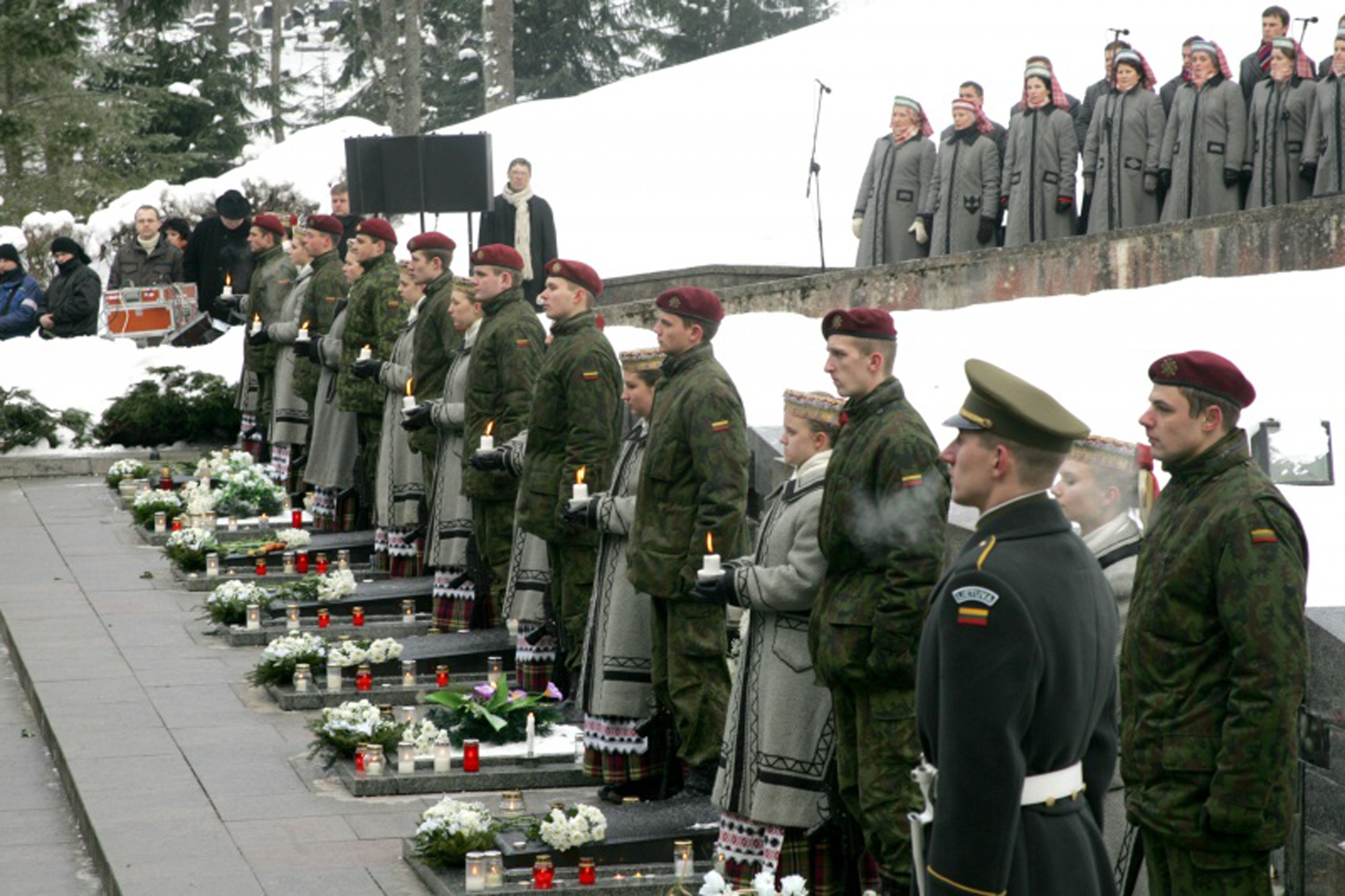
Commemoration ceremony near the victims' graves.

Immediately after the attacks, the Supreme Council issued a letter to the people of the Soviet Union and to the rest of the world denouncing the attacks and calling for foreign governments to recognise that the Soviet Union had committed an act of aggression against a sovereign nation. Following the first news reports from Lithuania, the government of Norway appealed to the United Nations. The government of Poland expressed their solidarity with the people of Lithuania and denounced the actions of the Soviet army.

The reaction from the United States government was somewhat muted as they were heavily preoccupied with the imminent onset of Operation Desert Storm against Iraq and worried about possible wider consequences if they were to offend the Soviets at that critical juncture. President George H. W. Bush denounced the incident, calling it "deeply disturbing" and that it "threatens to set back or perhaps even reverse the process of reform" in the Soviet Union. Bush was notably careful not to criticize Gorbachev directly, instead directing his remarks at "Soviet leaders".

After the events, Gorbachev said that Lithuanian "workers and intellectuals" complaining of anti-Soviet broadcasts had tried to talk to the Lithuanian parliament, but they were refused and beaten. Then, he said that Lithuanian "workers and intellectuals" asked the military commander in Vilnius to provide protection. Defense Minister Dmitry Yazov, Interior Minister Boris Pugo, and Gorbachev all asserted that no one in Moscow gave orders to use force in Vilnius. Yazov claimed that nationalists were trying to form what he called a bourgeois dictatorship. Pugo alleged on national television that the demonstrators had opened fire first.

During the following day, meetings of support took place in many cities (Kyiv, Riga, Tallinn) and some had defensive barricades built around their government districts (see The Barricades in Latvia).

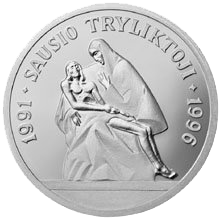
Litas commemorative coin dedicated to the 5th anniversary of the January 13 events

Although occupation and military raids continued for several months following the attacks, there were no large open military encounters after 13 January. Strong Western reaction and the actions of Soviet democratic forces put the President and the government of the Soviet Union in an awkward position. This influenced future Lithuanian-Russian negotiations and resulted in the signing of a treaty on 31 January.

During a visit by the official delegation of Iceland to Lithuania on 20 January, Foreign Minister Jón Baldvin Hannibalsson said: "My government is seriously considering the possibility of establishing diplomatic relations with the Republic of Lithuania." Iceland kept its promise, and on 4 February 1991, just three weeks after the attacks, it recognized the Republic of Lithuania as a sovereign independent state, and diplomatic relations were established between the two nations.

These events are considered some of the main factors that led to the overwhelming victory of independence supporters in a referendum on 9 February 1991. 84.73% of registered voters voted, of which 90.47% of them voted in favour of the full and total independence of Lithuania.

Streets in the neighborhood of the TV tower were later renamed after nine victims of the attack. A street in Titas Masiulis' native Kaunas was named after him, likewise a street in Marijampolė after its native, Rimantas Juknevičius, a street in Kėdainiai after Alvydas Kanapinskas, and a street in Pelėdnagiai (near Kėdainiai) after Vytautas Koncevičius.

From the interview of Mikhail Golovatov, ex-commander of "Alpha-group": "The weapons and ammunition that were given to us, were handed over at the end of the operation, so it can be established that not a single shot was fired from our side. But at the time of the assault, our young officer Victor Shatskikh was mortally wounded in the back. As we have already seized the TV tower and went outside, we came under fire from the windows of the neighbouring houses, and leaving from there we had to hide behind the armoured vehicles."

=== Criminal prosecution ===
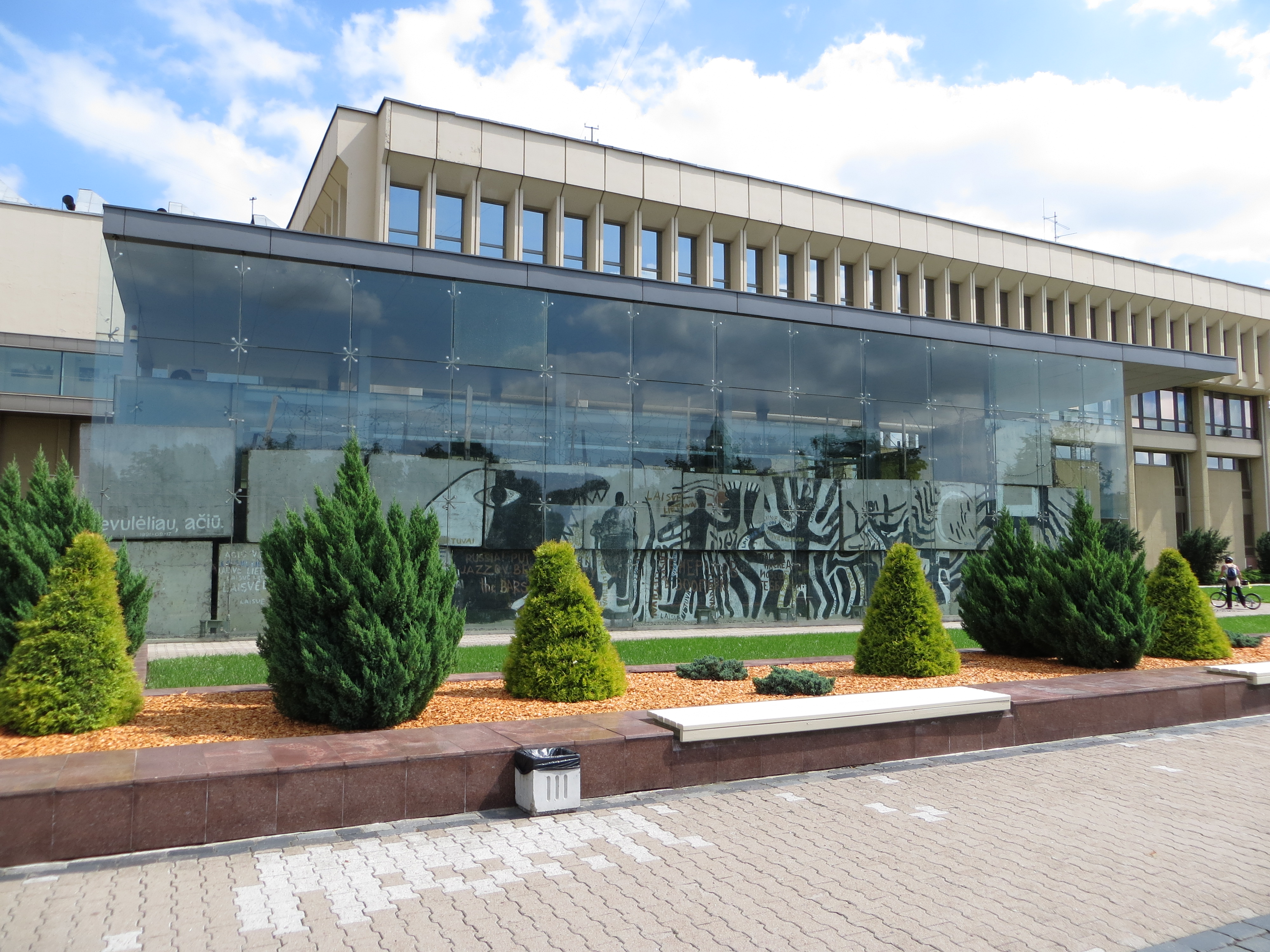
Remaining Seimas barricades nowadays

In 1996, two members of the Central Committee of Communist Party of the Lithuanian SSR, Mykolas Burokevičius and Juozas Jermalavičius, were given prison sentences for their involvement in the January Events. In 1999, the Vilnius District Court sentenced six former Soviet military men who participated in the events. On 11 May 2011, a soldier of the Soviet OMON Konstantin Mikhailov was sentenced to life in prison for killing customs workers and policemen in 1991 at the "Medininkai" border checkpoint with the Byelorussian SSR near the village of Medininkai (see Soviet aggression against Lithuania in 1990).

Since 1992, representatives of the Prosecutor General's Office of Lithuania requested Belarus to extradite Vladimir Uskhopchik, a former general who was in command of the Vilnius garrison in January 1991 and the editor of the newspaper Soviet Lithuania Stanislava Juonienė. Lithuania's request has been repeatedly denied.

In July 2011, diplomatic tensions rose between Austria and Lithuania when Mikhail Golovatov, an ex-KGB general who took part in 13 January 1991 massacre, was released after being detained at the Vienna Airport. He then proceeded to fly to Russia. In response, Lithuania recalled its ambassador from Austria.

Hearings in Vilnius District Court started on 27 January 2016, with 67 individuals facing charges of war crimes, crimes against humanity, battery, murder, endangering other's well-being, as well as unlawful military actions against civilians. The case consists of 801 volumes of documents, including 16 volumes of the indictment itself. The defendants included former Soviet Defense Minister Dmitry Yazov, former commander of Soviet Alpha anti-terror group Mikhail Golovatov, and Vladimir Uskhopchik.

Robertas Povilaitis, a surviving son of one of the victims, requested that law enforcement authorities conduct an investigation into Gorbachev's role in the events. On 17 October 2016, Vilnius Regional Court decided to summon Gorbachev to testify as a witness. The Russian Federation refused to question Gorbachev. As no pre-trial investigation has been initiated against Gorbachev in the 13 January case, the Chairman of the Constitutional Court of Lithuania Dainius Žalimas argued that it is hard to believe that the events happened without the knowledge of the President of the USSR. The role of Mikhail Gorbachev in the January events remains disputed.

In 2018, Russia's law enforcement began criminal proceedings against the Lithuanian prosecutors and judges who were investigating the case. Such Russian action was condemned by the European Parliament as "unacceptable external influence" and "politically motivated."

On 27 March 2019, Vilnius District Court found all 67 defendants guilty of war crimes or crimes against humanity. The vast majority of them were tried and sentenced in absentia. Among the high-profile defendants, former Soviet Defense Minister Dmitry Yazov was sentenced to 10 years in prison, Mikhail Golovatov to 12 years in prison and Vladimir Uskhopchik to 14 years in prison. Others were sentenced to prison terms between 4 and 12 years. Only two defendants, former soldiers Gennady Ivanov and Yuriy Mel, were in custody at the time, and the Russian government refused to extradite the other suspects.

On 31 March 2021, the Lithuanian Court of Appeal announced its judgement, which only increased the time of imprisonment for the sentenced and awarded non-pecuniary damage of 10.876 million Euro to the victims. A judge, who announced the judgement, said that: "As they drove with the tanks over the people, they understood perfectly well what they were doing." Thereafter, Russia threatened to take retaliatory actions for the judgement. The European Commissioner for Justice Didier Reynders had promised that the European Union will defend Lithuanian judges who heard the 13 January case from persecution by Russia. Minister for Foreign Affairs of Lithuania Gabrielius Landsbergis said that Lithuania will appeal to Interpol to reject Russia's appeal against the persecution of Lithuanian judges who heard the 13 January case.

In 2019, Russia and Belarus refused to extradite those who are responsible for the January Events.

As of March 2021, many of the 66 defendants remain out of reach of Lithuanian justice.

== Legacy ==
13 January is the Day of the Defenders of Freedom (Lithuanian: Laisvės Gynėjų Diena) in Lithuania. It is not a public holiday, but it is officially observed as a commemorative day. It is a vividly remembered day in the Lithuanian national memory. The day has been associated with mourning and the national flags are usually raised with a black ribbon attached. In recent years, forget-me-not flower pins have become a symbol of commemoration of the events.

Recently, there have been public debates about whether 13 January (and the events in general) should be viewed as the day of mourning or should rather be celebrated as the day of victory. Former Lithuanian leaders Landsbergis and Dalia Grybauskaitė expressed the view that 13 January is not only the day of mourning and commemorating those who sacrificed their lives, but also the day of national victory. Other prominent public figures described 13 January as a Victory Day, including Arvydas Pocius and Valdemaras Rupšys, both of whom were volunteers defending the Parliament during the events, as well as Rimvydas Valatka, Marius Laurinavičius, and Vytautas Ališauskas.

Lithuania has since accused Russia of trying to spread disinformation about the January Events. The European Parliament has condemned Russia and urged them to "cease the irresponsible disinformation and propaganda statements" regarding the 13 January case. EUvsDisinfo has documented several examples of disinformation in the pro-Kremlin media.

== See also ==
- Antakalnis Cemetery
- Baltic Way
- Black January
- The Barricades (Latvia)
- Autumn of Nations
- Sąjūdis
- April 9 tragedy
- Singing Revolution
- Soviet OMON assaults on Lithuanian border posts
- Vilnius TV Tower
