= Loreta Asanavičiūtė =

Lithuanian victim of violence (died Jan 1991)

- Portrait of Loreta Asanavičiūtė
- Born: April 22, 1967; Vilnius, Lithuanian SSR, Soviet Union
- Died: January 13, 1991 (aged 23); Vilnius, Lithuanian SSR, Soviet Union
- Burial place: Antakalnis Cemetery
- Occupation: Seamstress
- Known for: One of 14 people who was killed during January Events

Loreta Asanavičiūtė (22 April 1967 – 13 January 1991) was a Lithuanian seamstress who was killed in the January Events, a series of violent confrontations that took place near the Vilnius TV Tower in January 1991.

She was the only female among the 13 people who died in the events at the television tower. She was run over by a Soviet tank and died later in hospital.

== Early life and education ==
Loreta was born in Vilnius on April 22, 1967. In 1968, she began attending a nursery school in Antakalnis. In 1972, her family moved to Karoliniškės. She attended Vilnius 38th Secondary School in Lazdynai from 1974, and later transferred to Vilnius 41st Secondary School in Karoliniškės. In 1977, she switched to Vilnius 47th Secondary School, and in 1980, continued her studies at Vilnius 50th Secondary School, from which she graduated in 1982.

== Early career ==
After finishing school, Loreta began working at the "Aušra" sewing factory in 1982 as an apprentice, later becoming a seamstress. In 1983, she started working as a knitter at the "Dovana" collective, and in 1985, she graduated from the First Vilnius Night School.

== Cultural and personal life ==
In 1985, Loreta joined the "Dainava" folklore ensemble, with which she toured Moscow (1985), Leningrad (1986), and Lviv (1987). In 1988, she met Vincas, her future fiancé. That same year, she enrolled in the Vilnius Finance and Credit Technical School, where she graduated in 1990 with a degree in accounting.

== Political engagement ==
On August 23, 1989, Loreta participated in the historic Baltic Way demonstration, marking the 50th anniversary of the Molotov-Ribbentrop Pact.

== Death and legacy ==
On January 13, 1991, Loreta was killed in Vilnius while defending Lithuania's independence. She was guarding the Television Tower along with other citizens when Soviet military tank ran over her. She died from severe injuries caused by the tank's tracks, leading to slow internal bleeding. She died in the Red Cross Hospital.

== Posthumous recognition ==
On January 15, 1991, Loreta was posthumously awarded the Order of the Vytis Cross, 1st Class, for defending Lithuania's freedom and independence.

A 2.1-kilometre (1.3 mi) road in the centre of Vilnius is named Loretos Asanavičiūtės gatvė in her memory; it was formerly named Žvaigždžių, and renamed in 1996. The house she lived in (nr. 4) is located on that street, with a plaque commemorating her on its wall. A linden tree has been planted in her memory, along with oaks for her male fellow victims. She is buried in the Antakalnis Cemetery in Vilnius.

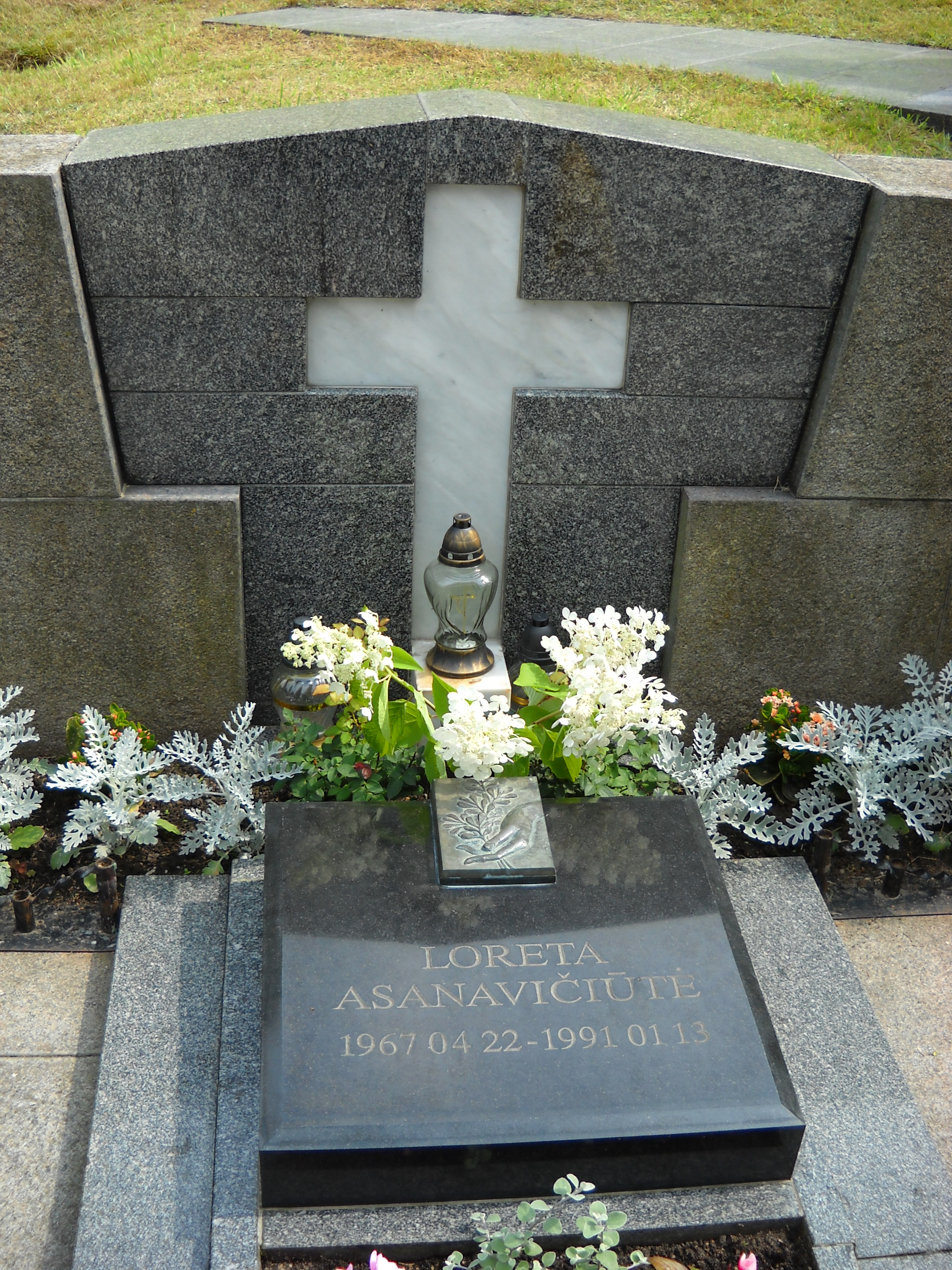
Asanavičiūtė's grave in Antakalnis Cemetery
