= Srpski Telegraf =

Daily newspapers in Serbia

- Type: Daily newspaper
- Format: Tabloid
- Owner: Medijska mreža
- Founder(s): Milan Lađević, Saša Milovanović
- Editor-in-chief: Dražen Ostojić
- Deputy editor: Tijana Cvejanović, Jovana Branković and Ognjen Bogdanović
- Managing editor: Milan Jovanović
- Photo editor: Branka Ćurčić
- Founded: 24 March 2016
- Political alignment: Pro‑SNS; Serbian nationalism; Conspiracy theorism; Pro‑Russian sentiment
- Language: Serbian
- Headquarters: Trg Nikole Pašića 7/II, Serbia
- Circulation: ~250,000 copies distributed for free (claimed, 2016)
- Website: Republika.rs

Srpski Telegraf is a Serbian daily tabloid newspaper based in Belgrade. It also operates the online portal Republika.rs. The first weekly edition of Srpski Telegraf was published on 4 July 2021.

== History ==
The first issue of Srpski Telegraf was published on 24 March 2016, with an initial circulation of 250,000 copies distributed free at kiosks. The newspaper was founded by journalists Milan Lađević and Saša Milovanović.

== Reputation and analysis ==
Media analysts and watchdogs have described Srpski Telegraf as politically aligned with the ruling Serbian Progressive Party (SNS) and President Aleksandar Vučić.

Media monitoring reports state that the outlet consistently promotes government positions and targets individuals who publicly criticize the authorities. During one year, analysis recorded 252 manipulative or unsubstantiated items across all sections featured on Srpski Telegraf’s front pages, indicating a pattern of inaccurate or manipulative reporting. The media outlet has been assessed as strictly untrustworthy, including its political section, general news, and crime reporting.

== Controversies ==
In 2022, journalist Vuk Cvijić reported a physical altercation with executive director Milan Lađević. The prosecution determined that the incident did not constitute a criminal offense. The Independent Journalists' Association of Serbia (NUNS) expressed concern over the decision, stating that it could undermine journalists' safety and the role of institutions responsible for protecting basic human rights and freedom of expression. NUNS urged the Higher Public Prosecutor's Office in Belgrade to review the decision and highlighted the need for faster and more effective responses to attacks on journalists. The association also expressed full support for Cvijić and his publication, Radar, and announced that it would continue to inform domestic and international organizations focused on media freedom and journalists' protection.

Srpski Telegraf has also been noted for publishing speculative statements regarding political scenarios, opposition activities, and international events. Some stories were highlighted in media monitoring reports for their unverified or exaggerated claims.

The Press Council issued a public warning to Srpski Telegraf after finding that the paper published a fabricated, unverified story based on a non-existent source, violating multiple provisions of the Journalists’ Code of Ethics. The Council’s monitoring further identified Srpski Telegraf as one of the outlets with the lowest compliance with ethical standards.

== Content and coverage ==
The newspaper publishes news on politics, regional and international affairs, popular culture, health, and sports. Its online portal Republika.rs features the same content, as well as more commentary, and opinion pieces.
