= State prosecutor =

State prosecutor may refer to a prosecutor who works for a state government; see:

- District attorney
- Public prosecutor
- State's attorney

State Prosecutor may also be the name of a specific office, such as:

- Prosecutors Office
