= Walulis sieht fern =

- Genre: Comedy, Satire
- Created by: Philipp Walulis
- Written by: Philipp Walulis, Nikolai Kleinhammer, Tobias Klose, Jakob Schreier
- Directed by: Philipp Walulis, Tobias Klose
- Presented by: Philipp Walulis
- Starring: Philipp Walulis, Marion Eva Krawitz, Sabrina Gander, Chris Mancin, Tobias Klose, Samira El Ouassil and others
- Theme music composer: Professor Kliq
- Opening theme: Wire & Flashing Lights
- Ending theme: Wire & Flashing Lights
- Composers: Anrne Hörmann, Sebastian Fischer
- Country of origin: Germany
- Original language: German
- No. of seasons: 3
- No. of episodes: 14

Production
- Producer: Klaus Kranewitter
- Editors: Matthias Andrzejewski, Sue Bauroth, Tobias Füller, Sebastian Prams, Jan Philipp Stahl
- Production company: Enrico Pallazzo Medienmanufaktur UG

Original release
- Network: EinsPlus
- Release: December 8, 2011

Walulis sieht fern (English: Walulis watches TV) was a satirical German television show broadcast on digital television channel EinsPlus. The show was created and presented by its namesake, Philipp Walulis. It parodied German television under the motto "Fernsehen macht blöd, aber auch unglaublich viel Spaß!" (TV makes you stupid, but also is incredibly much fun!) The show was discontinued because of the switching off of the channel "EinsPlus" in 2016. Now you can watch it on YouTube and "funk" on the channel "Walulis". Videos were uploaded until 2022. There was also a separate channel "Walulis Daily" that looked like a typical late-night-show. The uploads stopped in 2023.
