= Funk (service) =

German video-on-demand service

- Website type: Video on demand
- Available in: German
- Headquarters: Mainz, Germany
- Area served: Germany
- Key people: Florian Hager, Sophie Burkhardt
- Services: Streaming service
- Parent: ARD; ZDF
- Website: www.funk.net
- Launched: 1 October 2016
- Current status: Active

Funk is a German video-on-demand service, operated by the public broadcasters ARD and ZDF. SWR, a regional ARD member, is responsible for the service. Funk describes itself as a "content network". The target group is people between the age of 14 and 29.

== History ==
The director of SWR, Peter Boudgoust, advocated for a public service offer for the target audience in 2011. On 27 November 2012, SWR expressed a wish to merge EinsPlus with ZDFkultur. The new station created by this merger would be produced jointly by ARD and ZDF and primarily target a young audience. ZDF expressed caution, pointing out that this would require a decision by politicians. However, ZDF had already made a similar statement in advance and did not rule out, for example, a discontinuation of ZDFkultur in favor of a joint youth channel.

== About ==
Funk is aimed at people between the ages of 14 and 29, who rarely access the traditional media used for public broadcasting. Two thirds of the project's funding is provided by ARD and one third by ZDF.

Funk produces over 70 programs for social media platforms, such as YouTube, Facebook, Twitter, Instagram, TikTok, Spotify, Snapchat, and the funk.net web app, as well as publishing browser games such as Bundesfighter II Turbo. These are distributed on their own channels or accounts. The programs focus on information and entertainment. In addition, some series are distributed under license, sometimes in their original English versions. Programs are produced by various private production companies, the company's own production companies or by the broadcasters themselves.

The funk network is subject to the Interstate Broadcasting Agreement. This includes a review of all broadcasts at least every six months.
