= Philipp Walulis =

German television presenter and radio host

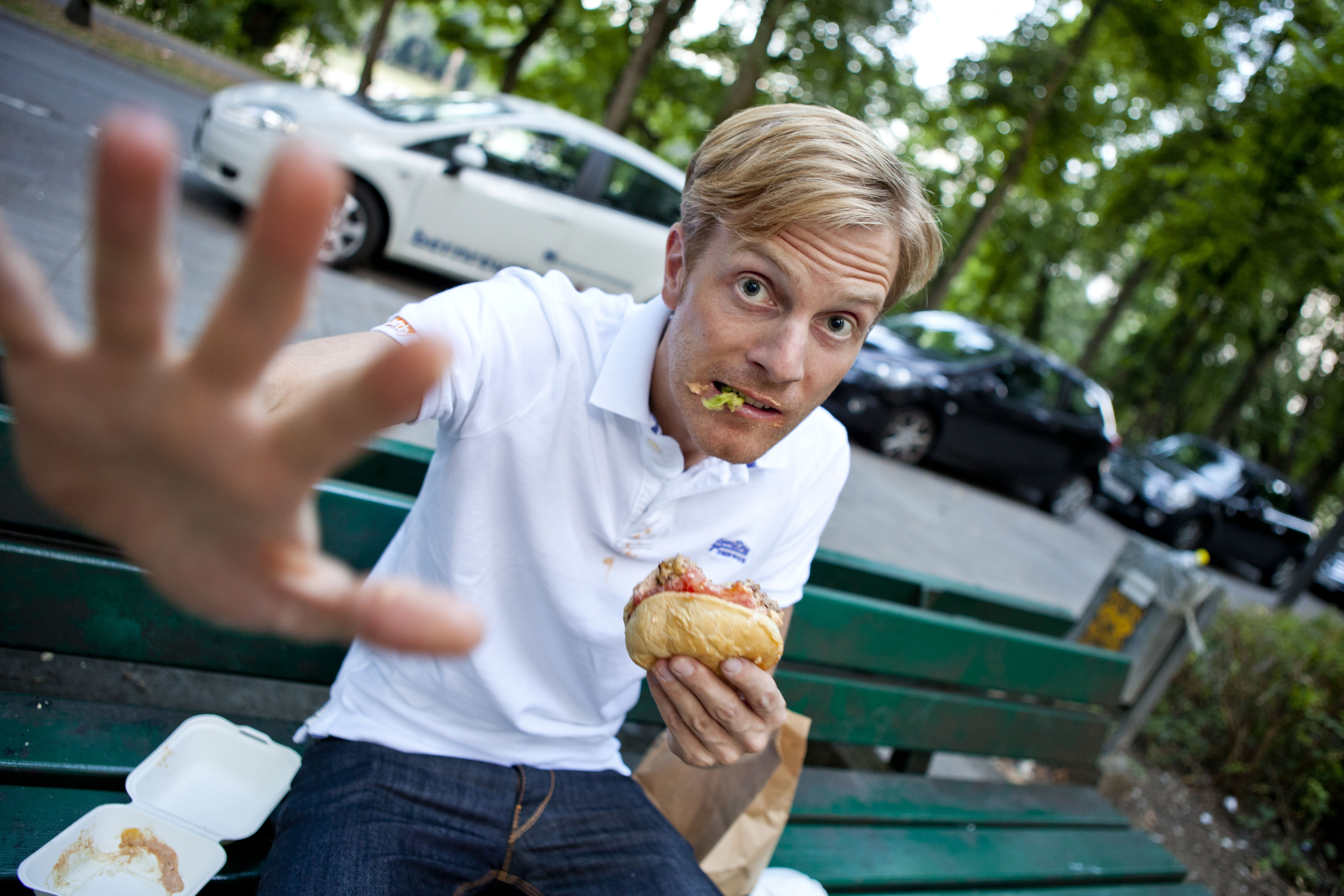
- Walulis emphasized an unfavorable photo in his Wikipedia article in Season 3 Episode 5 of Walulis sieht fern.
- Born: Philipp Xaver Walulis; 5 August 1980 (age 45); Starnberg, Bavaria, Germany
- Occupations: Television presenter, radio personality
- Website: www.walulis.de

Philipp Xaver Walulis (born 5 August 1980) is a German television presenter and radio host.

Walulis was born in Starnberg and raised in Pöcking. He studied at LMU Munich. From 2004, he appeared as a host many radio shows, where he joined with satirical shows. He founded the satirical band Aggro Grünwald (de) in 2007. Many large media organisations such as 3sat or the Süddeutsche Zeitung fell for this parody. At the end of 2011, on Tele 5, he started the satirical television show Walulis sieht fern for which he was awarded the Grimme-Preis. The show ran from May 2012 to September 2016 on EinsPlus on the ARD network. The television show parodies German television under the motto "Fernsehen macht blöd, aber auch unglaublich viel Spaß!" ("TV makes you stupid, but it is also a lot of fun!").
