= Vilnius TV Tower =

- The Vilnius TV Tower

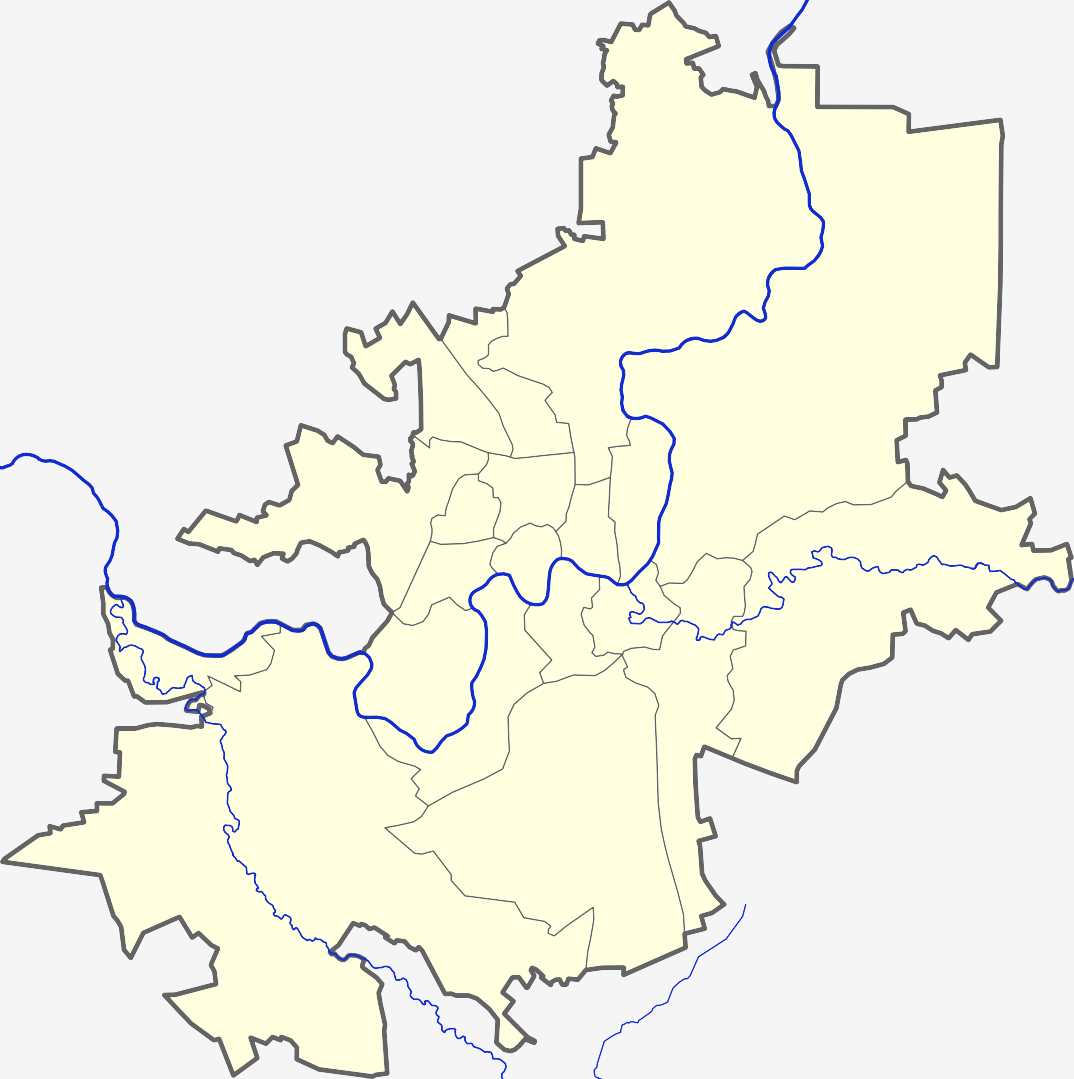
- Location within Vilnius Location within Lithuania

General information
- Type: observation, telecommunications, attraction
- Location: Vilnius, Lithuania
- Coordinates: 54°41′14″N 025°12′53″E
- Construction started: 1974; 52 years ago
- Completed: 1978; 48 years ago

Height
- Antenna spire: 326.5 m (1,071.2 ft)

The Vilnius TV Tower (Lithuanian: Vilniaus televizijos bokštas) is a 326.5 m (1,071 ft) high tower in the Karoliniškės residential district of Vilnius, Lithuania. It is the tallest structure in Lithuania, and the 29th tallest self-supporting tower in the world. It belongs to the SC Lithuanian Radio and Television Centre (Lithuanian: AB Lietuvos radijo ir televizijos centras).

== Design and construction ==
Ground-level image of Vilnius TV tower

The tower was designed by V. Obydov and the engineering section by K. Balėnas. The construction of the tower started on May 31, 1974, and finished on December 30, 1980. The construction was funded by the 11th Five Year Plan of the Soviet Union, which had earmarked funds for strategic investment in the then Lithuanian SSR. The weight of the whole structure is estimated at 25,000 to 30,000 metric tons (55,000,000–66,000,000 lb). The structure is composed of a concrete base, a 190 m (623 ft) long hollow reinforced concrete pipe, a reinforced concrete saucer, and a 136 m (446 ft) long steel spike. Radio transmitters are housed in the lower part of the concrete tower with antennas attached to the steel spike.

The observation deck 165 m (541 ft) from the ground houses the café "Paukščių takas" (English: Milky Way), offers a view of the city and its surroundings, and sports a rotating platform that revolves once every 45 minutes. High-speed elevators reach the café from ground level in 40 seconds. On clear days, visibility can extend as far as Elektrėnai, a city approximately 40 km (25 mi) west, where power plants produced much of the electricity for Vilnius in Soviet times.

== Museum ==
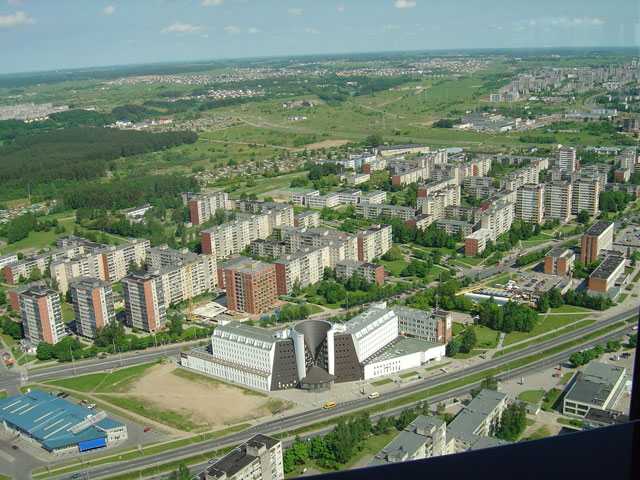
View from Vilnius TV tower

The TV tower played a major role in the events of January 13, 1991, when 14 unarmed civilians lost their lives and 700 were injured opposing the Soviet military seizure of the tower. A small museum dedicated to the January 1991 battle is housed on the ground floor, and various markers in the surrounding area indicate places where Lithuanian citizens died while trying to maintain the blockade against Soviet troops.

== Decoration ==
Since 2000 the tower has been decorated to look like a Christmas tree each Christmas season. During the 2006 World Basketball Championship it was decorated with a large basketball net. Vilnius TV Tower became the biggest basketball hoop in the world during the 2011 FIBA European Basketball Championship. The hoop was 35 metres in diameter with a 40-metre-high net, assembled at a height of 170 metres. The lighting of the giant hoop took 2,560 metres of lighting cable and 545 bulbs. Bungee jumps are available to the public from the roof of the observation deck.

Since 2019 tower decorations had changed. LED lighting was installed and the tower has been glowing bright blue color in the dark. During national celebrations, the tower changes its color to that of the flag of Lithuania by glowing for 2 minutes in one color.
