= Parquet (legal) =

Type of government organization

The parquet is the office of the prosecution, in some countries, responsible for presenting legal cases at criminal trials against individuals or parties accused of breaking the law.

== Office ==
The word literally means "wooden floor"; this is because, as opposed to the judges, who sit on an elevated platform during trials, the prosecution pleads standing on the floor. This also explains why the judges are sometimes referred to as "sitting magistrates" (magistrature assise) or "magistrates of the bench" (magistrats du siège) while the prosecutors are sometimes referred to as "standing magistrates" (magistrature debout).

In France, the parquet général is the public prosecutor's office of the appellate court (cour d'appel) or the Supreme Court (Cour de Cassation).

In Brazil, Portugal and Macau, the prosecutor's office, the "Public Ministry" (Ministério Público), is metonymically referred to as the parquet.

In Romania, the prosecutor's office, the "Public Ministry" (Ministerul Public), is also called the parchet (pronounced [parˈket]) and is allocated to a certain court at the local or national level.

In Dutch, the word parquet is translated as parket and it is also used to generally refer to the 'Public Ministry' (Openbaar Ministerie).

== See also ==
- Prosecutor
- Public prosecutor's office (German: Staatsanwaltschaft)
- Prosecution Ministry
