= EinsPlus =

- Country: Germany
- Headquarters: Stuttgart, Germany

Programming
- Picture format: 720p HDTV (downscaled to 16:9 576i for the SDTV feed)

Ownership
- Owner: ARD
- Sister channels: Das Erste; EinsFestival tagesschau24

History
- Launched: 29 August 1997; 28 years ago (as EinsMuXx); 23 April 2005; 20 years ago (rebranded EinsPlus)
- Closed: 30 September 2016; 9 years ago (19 years, 32 days)
- Former names: EinsMuXx

Links
- Website: einsplus.de

Availability

Terrestrial
- Digital terrestrial television: Previously available in Baden-Württemberg, Bavaria and Rhineland-Palatinate

EinsPlus was a German free-to-air television channel owned by ARD and operated by SWR. The channel launched on 29 August 1997 under the name EinsMuXx, and was renamed EinsPlus on 23 April 2005.

The channel, along with ZDFkultur was closed on 30 September 2016.

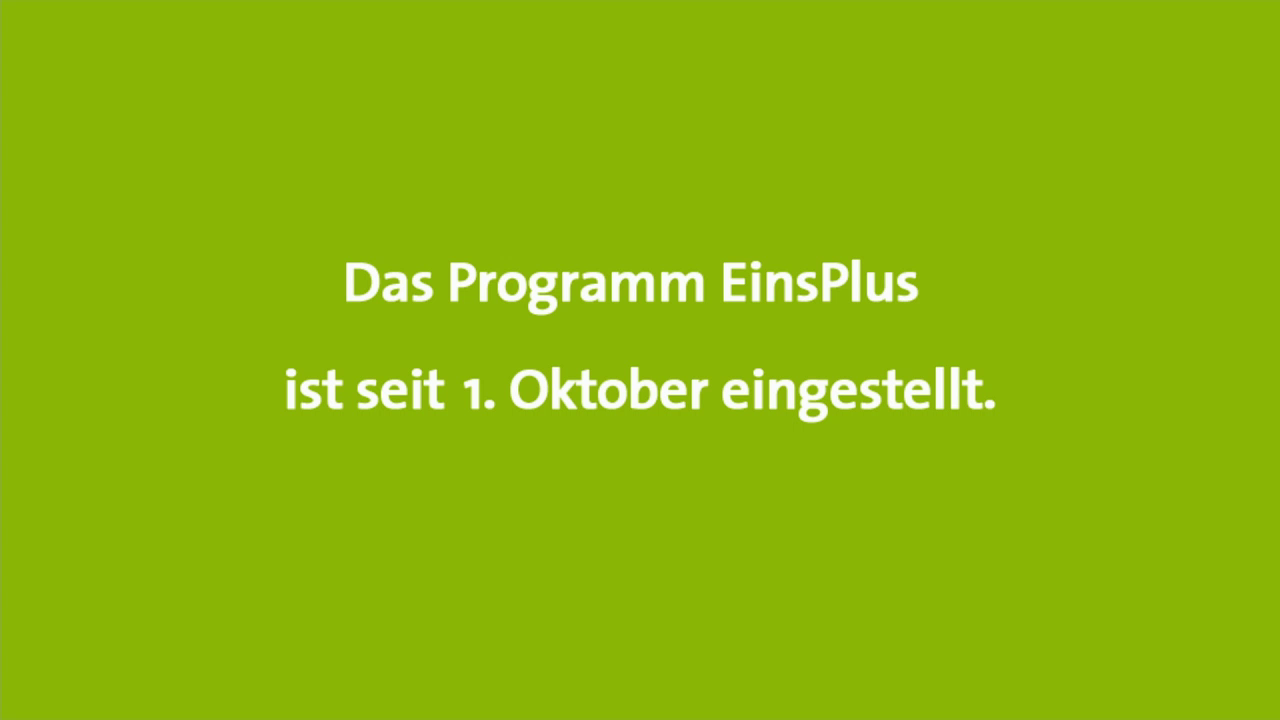
Notice after the TV network is closed down.

== Programming ==
- ARD-Buffet (2006–2012)
- Auf 3 Sofas durch ... (2012–2016)
- Crowdspondent - Deine persönlichen Reporter (2014)
- extra 3 (2009–2016)
- In Deutschland um die Welt (2013–2016)
- leben! Was Menschen bewegt (2009–2013)
- Nachtcafé (2009–2010)
- Walulis sieht fern (2012–2016)
- WTF?! Wissen - Testen - Forschen (2013–2015)

== Logos and identities ==
April to October 2005

2005 to 2013

2012 to 2013

2013 to 2016

2013 to 2016

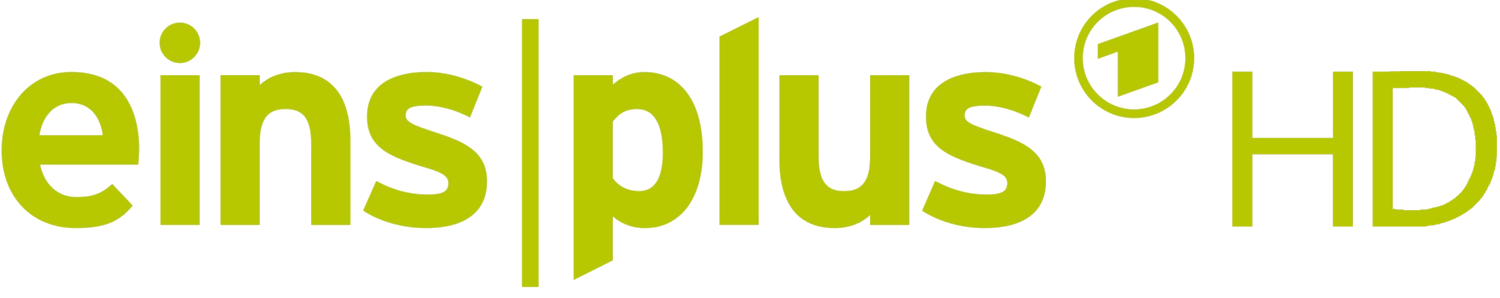
HD feed, 2013 to 2016
