= Public prosecutor's office =

Authority responsible for law enforcement and prosecution service

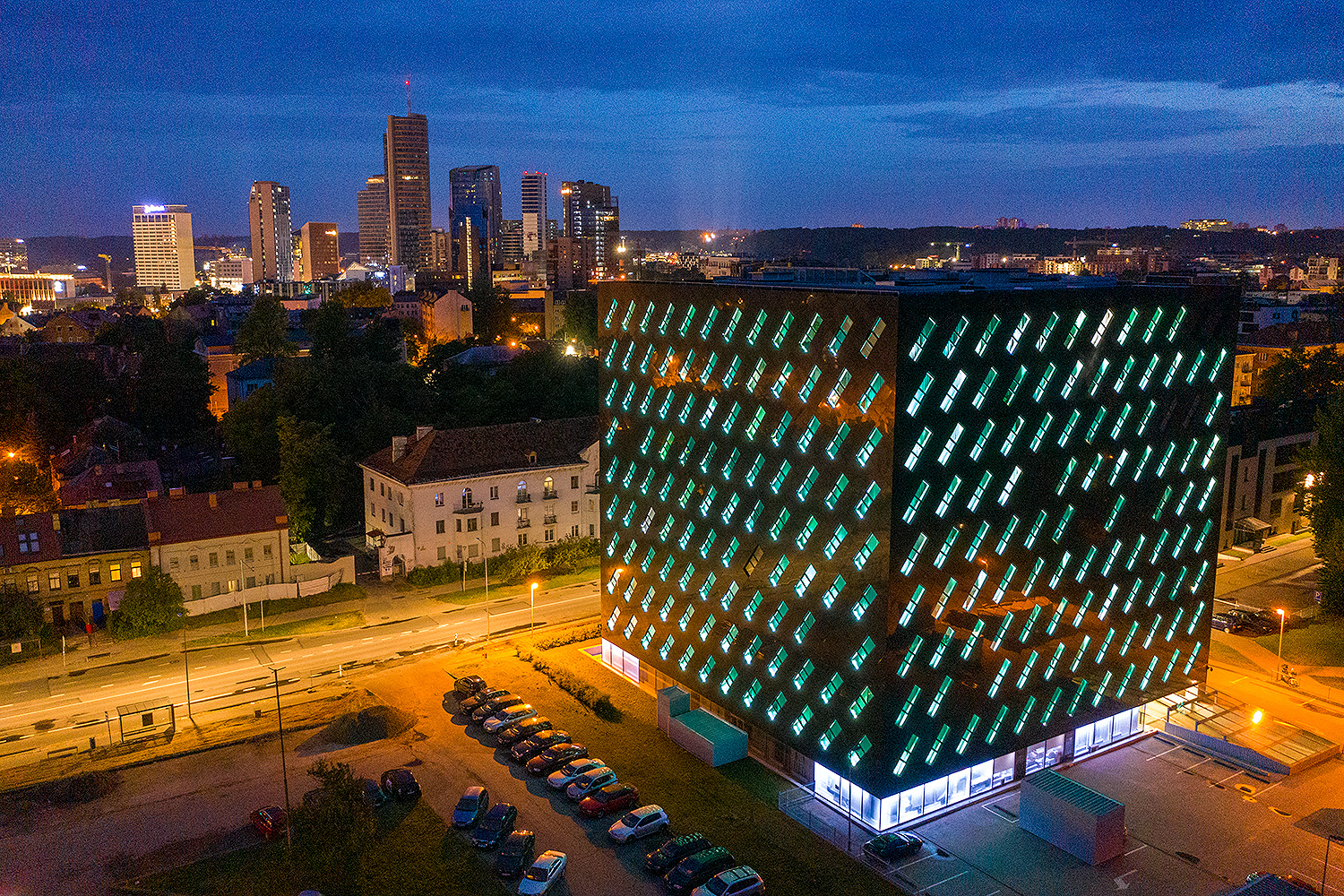
Lithuanian public prosecutor's office in Vilnius

Public prosecutor's offices are criminal justice bodies attached to the judiciary.

They are separate from the courts in Germany, Austria and the German-speaking parts of Switzerland, and are called the Staatsanwaltschaft (German: [ˈʃtaːt͡sʔanˌvaltʃaft]).

This kind of office also exists in mainland China, Taiwan and Macau (which continues to follow the Portuguese legal system), North Korea, and in some countries in Central Europe including Slovakia, Hungary, Slovenia, Poland and the Czech Republic.

== See also ==
- Prosecution
- Parquet (legal)
- Public prosecutor's office (France)
- Public prosecutor's office (Germany)
- Public Prosecutors Office (Japan)
- Public Prosecutors Office (Brazil)
- Public Prosecutors Office (Honduras)
- Crown Prosecution Service
- Director of Public Prosecutions (in the Commonwealth)
