= 1990 Lithuanian Supreme Soviet election =

- 24 February 1990 (first round); 4–10 March 1990 (second round)
- All 141 seats in the Supreme Soviet; 71 seats needed for a majority
- Turnout: 71.72%
Party	Leader	Seats
LKP (independent)	Algirdas Brazauskas	46
LSDP	Kazimieras Antanavičius	9
LKP	Mykolas Burokevičius	7
LŽP	Rūta Gajauskaitė	4
LDP	Saulius Pečeliūnas	3
LKDP	Algirdas Saudargas	2
Independents	—	64
By endorsement
Endorsed by Sąjūdis	Vytautas Landsbergis	91
Others	—	44
This lists parties that won seats. See the complete results below.
Chairman of the Presidium of the Supreme Soviet before	Chairman of the Supreme Council – Reconstituent Seimas after
Algirdas Brazauskas; LKP	Vytautas Landsbergis; Independent (endorsed by Sąjūdis)

Supreme Soviet elections were held in the Lithuanian SSR on 24 February with run-off elections on 4, 7, 8 and 10 March 1990 to elect the 141 members of the Supreme Soviet. In six constituencies, voter turnout was below the required minimum and a third round was held on 17 and 21 April. For the first time since 1940 elections to the People's Seimas, non-communist candidates were allowed to run. The elections were the first free nationwide elections since 1926, and only the fifth free elections in all of Lithuanian history.

The pro-independence Sąjūdis movement refused to become a political party and endorsed non-partisan candidates or candidates of various other political parties based on their personal merits. These endorsements often meant more than the official party affiliations, and Sąjūdis-backed candidates won 91 seats, an outright majority. During its third session on 11 March 1990, the Supreme Soviet adopted the Act of the Re-Establishment of the State of Lithuania, declaring Lithuania's independence from the Soviet Union.

== Background ==
The Eleventh Supreme Soviet of the Lithuanian SSR was elected on 24 February 1985. It acted as rubber stamp legislature up until the summer of 1988. By the summer of that same year Reform Movement was founded and gained support Lithuanian SSR-wide. Along side this, General Secretary of the Communist Party of the Soviet Union Mikhail Gorbachev announced the slogan of Demokratizatsiya, which intended to make Soviet institutions more democratic. It proposed candidacy of more than one person to single seat in soviets of various levels in the elections.

On 15 January 1989 the first free elections took place for two vacant deputies' seats in Šiauliai. One of them has been won by Sąjūdis supported independent candidate Zigmas Vaišvila.

On 26 March 1989 elections took place for 42 seats in the Congress of People's Deputies. Despite the Easter Sunday celebrations and boycott by dissident organizations such as the Lithuanian Liberty League, the turnout reached 82.5%. The results were a sweeping victory to Sąjūdis: 36 out of its 39 candidates won against the Communist Party of Lithuania (CPL) (some of these candidates were CPL members themselves). The communists won only 6 seats; two of them were uncontested, as Sąjūdis withdrew its candidates in favor of Algirdas Brazauskas and Vladimiras Beriozovas. CPL, shaken by the defeat, was losing authority and membership. To save the party, its leader Brazauskas moved closer to the pro-independence movements. By the summer of 1989, the party supported calls for "sovereignty" and cooperated with Sąjūdis.

On 29 September 1989 the Supreme Soviet of the Lithuanian SSR Deputies' Election Act was passed. It reduced future Supreme Soviet by 60 per cent (from 350 to 141 members) and eliminated deputies from local government soviets and various organisations in the process. At the same day, election day to the new Supreme Soviet of the Lithuanian SSR was proposed on 24 February 1990, what will be done on 23 November 1989. Initially, appointment (not electing) over one third of all deputies was proposed, but, due to public pressure, this proposal was not put in Election Act.

On 7 December 1989 the Supreme Soviet of the Lithuanian SSR, then almost fully controlled by CPL, amended the Constitution of the Lithuanian SSR eliminating Article 6, which established communist party monopoly in political life. At the same day, Article 7, which established participation of the Lithuanian Komsomol in political life (including elections), was amended as well. These decisions meant that Lithuania eliminated legal obstacles for a multi-party system and allowed other parties to compete in the upcoming parliamentary elections.

During its 20th congress on 19–20 December the CPL separated itself from the Communist Party of the Soviet Union (CPSU) by a vote of 855 to 160. For such insubordination, Brazauskas was scolded in a special session of the Central Committee of CPSU and Mikhail Gorbachev made a personal visit to Lithuania to heal the rift in January 1990. However, such measures changed little and CPL (independent) kept slowly pushing for independence. This political divorce was not approved by hardline communists. They established a separate CPL, which was still part of the CPSU, and claimed to be the legal successor of the "real" CPL. This pro-Moscow group was led by Mykolas Burokevičius and included disproportionately large numbers of representatives from Russian and Polish minorities.

== Electoral system ==
Members of the Supreme Soviet were elected from single-member constituencies by two-round system. Second round has been used or repeated if no candidate reach 50 per cent of all votes given or less than 50 per cent of all registered voters, who voted in constituency.

== Campaign ==
The main competition was between Sąjūdis and CPL (independent). While both camps agreed on the eventual goal of independent Lithuania, Sąjūdis advocated acting quickly without fearing Moscow's reaction and CPL campaigned for a step-by-step approach to avoid conflict with Moscow. Even though Sąjūdis was not a political party and was not reflected in any official statistics, its endorsements had an immense influence on candidate's electability because the votes would be cast not for party lists, but for specific personalities. Such endorsements would be handed out based on personal merits and without regard to political affiliation. Therefore, a number of CPL members was backed by Sąjūdis. Other parties were formed just recently and did not enjoy widespread popularity. Of all parties participating, only CPL (CPSU) did not support Lithuanian independence.

A total of 522 candidates registered for the election, but 50 dropped out before the election day. Of the remaining 472 candidates, 201 were proposed by the CPL (independent), 139 were nonpartisans, and 79 were listed by CPL (CPSU).

== Opinion polls ==
Polling Firm	Last date of polling	Sąjūdis	LKP	LSDP	LKDP	LDP	LŽP	LKP (TSKP)
VNTC	29 December 1989 – 3 January 1990	27.7	39.9	3.1	6.4	4.3	3.6	8.2
VNTC	25 November – 1 December 1989	46.9	17.3	3.2	9.7	5.4	6.5	-
VNTC	29 September – 5 October 1989	49.7	19.6	3.1	8.2	5.1	7.2	-

== Results ==
A total of 90 delegates were elected in the first round. In 51 constituencies, the run-off elections were held in early March. Originally scheduled for 10 March, the run-off was pushed forward whenever possible so that the Supreme Soviet could meet as soon as possible (all run-offs were held on 4, 7–10 March). Due to low voter turnout (primarily in areas where Polish and Russian minorities concentrated), elections in six constituencies were invalid.

Of the 135 members elected, 91 had been endorsed by Sąjūdis, including 58 of the 64 independents, 17 of the independent Communists, all elected members of the Social Democrats, Greens and Christian Democrats, and one of the three Democratic Party members. (Note: Different sources often provide different breakdown between Sąjūdis, nonpartisan, and CPL (independent) delegates as the division was not clear-cut: Sąjūdis did not have formal membership while CPL kept losing its members. CPL (independent), despite internal reforms and push for independence, fared rather poorly. Observers note that the communists ran a passive campaign and lacked personalities that could compete with prominent intellectuals of Sąjūdis. Also, the campaign was framed as a referendum for Lithuania's independence – all those in support were morally obligated to vote for Sąjūdis.)

Party	First round			Second round			Total seats
Party	Votes	%	Seats	Votes	%	Seats	Total seats
Communist Party of Lithuania (independent)			22			24	46
Lithuanian Social-Democratic Party			9			0	9
Communist Party of Lithuania (CPSU)			7			0	7
Lithuanian Green Party			2			2	4
Lithuanian Democratic Party			0			3	3
Lithuanian Christian Democratic Party			2			0	2
Young Communist League			0			0	0
Independents			48			16	64
Vacant							6
Total			90			45	141
Valid votes	1,814,218	97.99					
Invalid/blank votes	37,125	2.01					
Total votes	1,851,343	100.00					
Registered voters/turnout	2,581,359	71.72					
Source: University of Essex, CSCE, Tiesa

== Aftermath ==
Immediately after the first round, elected delegates gathered for semi-formal discussions and consultations. Some of the critical decisions were made during these "tea talks" between the first and second rounds of the election. The Supreme Soviet was to convene as soon as possible (two weeks after the election) and declare independence without delay. The Lithuanians were afraid that during the scheduled assembly of the Congress of People's Deputies on 12 March 1990, Gorbachev would be appointed as the President of the Soviet Union and would gain greater powers within the union. Specifically, Lithuanians feared that Gorbachev would pass a law on secession that would make it virtually impossible to break away from the Soviet Union. At the time of its first gathering on 10 March, the final results of the run-off election were not yet available.

During the first session, the delegates elected a commission to verify the election results. As verification was a time-consuming process, the Supreme Soviet adjourned until 09:00 the next morning. On 11 March the Supreme Soviet elected Vytautas Landsbergis, leader of Sąjūdis, as its chairman (91 votes) against Algirdas Brazauskas, leader of CPL, (38 votes). On the same day the Soviet changed its name to the Supreme Council of the Republic of Lithuania, re-adopted interwar coat of arms, and passed the Act of the Re-Establishment of the State of Lithuania (124 votes in favor, 6 abstentions, none opposed). It also abolished Soviet constitutions and re-adopted the Lithuanian Constitution of 1938, the last constitution before the Soviet occupation. It was a symbolic move to emphasize the legal continuity of the interwar state as the Constitution of 1938 was suspended minutes later and replaced by the Provisional Fundamental Law, based on the Constitution of Lithuanian SSR proposals of 1989. Thus Lithuania officially declared its independence from the Soviet Union.
