= 4th Congress of the Communist Party of Lithuania =

1924 meeting in Moscow

The 4th Congress of the Communist Party of Lithuania was held in Moscow on July 17–21, 1924. At the time, the Communist Party of Lithuania was an illegal underground organization inside Lithuania. The 4th party congress was held immediately after the closure of the 5th World Congress of the Communist International. At the event work in legal mass organizations in Lithuania was reviewed, and afterwards instructions were sent to local party organizations. The congress took place at a juncture when factional struggles inside the Russian Communist Party (Bolsheviks) were beginning to intensify.

== Preparations ==
As of 1924 the Communist Party was a banned underground political organization in Lithuania. Party cadres were hunted by the secret police, and the party operated in secret cells and used a complex system of code names, safe houses and clandestine communication channels to operate. About half of the incumbent Central Committee members were based in Moscow - Vincas Kapsukas, Zigmas Angarietis, Baltrus Matusevičius and Jonas Kubickis. But in the spring of 1924 the party leadership noted some success in the organization of May Day celebrations in Kaunas and Šiauliai. In the view of the party leadership there was a temporary stabilization of capitalism and that conditions would be ripe to expand mass work of the party. The Central Committee convoked the 4th party congress. In preparation for the 4th party congress a number of party district conferences were held clandestinely inside Lithuania, electing 14 delegates to the 4th party congress. Chaimas Kaplanas, in a 1971 article, recalls how the Šiauliai Party District Conference was convened in a forest near Akmenė in early July 1924. Participants discussed the experiences from activities in the area in the recent period. They elected a District Committee and delegation for the 4th party congress. The meeting was concluded in the evening with the singing of The Internationale in low voice.

== Participants ==
There were 4 delegates elected from the Kaunas Party District, 4 delegates from the Šiauliai Party District, 2 delegates from the Klaipėda Party District, 2 delegates from the Vilkaviškis Party District, 1 delegate from the Panevėžys Party District and 1 delegate from the Marijampolė Party District. The 14 congress delegates represented some 800 party members. However, 3 delegates where unable to reach the 4th party congress in Moscow due to the prevailing conditions in Lithuania (1 from Šiauliai, 1 from Vilkaviškis and the sole Marijampolė delegate). The 11 delegates in attendance were Vilhelm Knorin, Bronius Leonas-Pušinis, Antanas Stasiūnas, Petras Šyvis (Kaunas), Kapsukas, Chaimas Kaplanas, Julius Garadauskas (Šiauliai), Juozas Greifenbergeris, Martynas Jonelaitis (Klaipėda), Angarietis (Vilkaviškis) and Karolis Požela (Panevėžys). Kaplanas gives a slightly different account regarding the Šiauliai Party District delegation, stating that Kapsukas, Kriščiūnas and himself were elected delegates and that all three would have been present in at the congress (in his 1971 article he vividly remembers the journey of Kriščiūnas and him to Moscow). However Kaplanas affirms that there were 14 delegates elected by the Party Districts and 11 that attended the congress. Delegates journeyed in secret to the Soviet Union, wary of being captured by state security. Just before cross the Lithuanian-Latvian border by foot at the forests near Lake Avilys, Kaplanas and Kriščiūnas spotted a man they thought to be a police officer pursuing them. Upon arrival at Hotel Lux in Moscow they realised the man had in fact been the Kaunas Party District delegate Petras Šyvis.

In addition to being elected as delegate from the Kaunas Party District, Stasiūnas also represented the Young Communist League of Lithuania at the 4th party congress. Sergey Girinis, Roman Pilar, Antanas Sniečkus and Baltrus Matusevičius - Lithuanian communists residing in Soviet exile attended the 4th party congress with consultative vote. Kaplanas (1971) also mentions Rapolas Rasikas and Antanas Niedvaras as Soviet exile attendees.

There were a number of representatives of fraternal parties attending; Otto Rästas (Communist Party of Estonia), Kullervo Manner (Communist Party of Finland), Franciszek Grzelszczak-Grzegorzewski (Communist Workers Party of Poland) and Pēteris Stučka and Karlis Krastinis (Communist Party of Latvia). Per the account of Kaplanas, Polish communist Jan Olski also attended the event.

== Congress proceedings ==
The proceedings of the 4th party congress commenced at around 10 a.m. on July 17, 1924, in the meeting room of the Executive Committee of the Communist International, on the second floor of the Comintern headquarters building near the Red Square. The congress was opened with a silent tribute to Lenin, who had died few months earlier. A congress presidium was elected, consisting of Angarietis, Kapsukas and Jonelaitis. Požela and Sniečkas were elected as the congress secretariat. Angarietis, Kapsukas and Požela would constitute the editorial commission of the 4th party congress. Beginning the presentation of reports from the Central Committee Angaretis spoke on the political context in Lithuania and Požela presented the organizational report of the outgoing Central Committee about the activities since the third party congress. The resolutions adopted by the congress after hearing the Central Committee reports endorsed the 1923 reorganization of the Central Committee (in early 1923 the reorganization of the old Central Committee had taken place, whereby a Politburo and Organizational Bureau were created, to try to cope with the situation where the Central Committee membership was geographically dispersed between Kaunas, Vilnius and Moscow) and argued that the party leadership had taken a Bolshevik position correcting earlier mistakes, whereby the party had been strengthened ideologically although the party was shrinking in size. It was noted that the share of workers in party membership ranks had grown to about 60%, with the remaining 40% being occupied by clerks, small landowners, etc. After lunch the congress delegates joined delegates of the Comintern and Profintern congresses to visit various Moscow factories were political rallies were organized.

As the congress resumed the following day Kapsukas presented a report on the tasks of the party, party statutes and on the activities of the party inside the armed forces, Požela presented a report on party activities in among peasants, women and municipal bodies, Angarietis spoke on agitation and propaganda and work in trade union, Knorin spoke on the party program, Greifenbergeris spoke on the role of the party in the Klaipėda Region, Stasiūnas spoke on the youth movement.

The 4th party congress argued that the Communist Party of Lithuania should take a leading role in the struggles of the working class on day-to-day issues, and through such activism bring the workers and poor peasants from fighting for immediate partial demands towards the larger goals of the overthrow of capitalism and establish the dictatorship of the proletariat. This would be achieved by strengthening the work of the party in legal mass organizations, especially trade unions. The congress denounced the role of Social Democrats in the trade union movement, accusing them of 'splitting' the labour movement. The congress defined as the most important task the formation of a united Central Bureau of Trade Unions. It called for building unity between the labour organizations in the Klaipėda Region and the rest of Lithuania. Echoing the resolution on the peasant movement of the Comintern congress, the LKP congress called on party organizations to build support for Krestintern among the Lithuanian peasatry. The congress reflected on work in legal organizations, whether they be trade unions, cooperatives, municipal bodies and educational and cultural institutions. Decisions were taken to send communist cadres to work within organizations such as the Lithuanian Riflemen's Union and the Christian Democratic-led Lithuanian Labour Federation. The congress adopted a Resolution on petty-bourgeois deviations in literature, denouncing 'petty-bourgeois' deviations in the J. Janonis' Union of Lithuanian Proletarian Poets and called of the strengthening of literary activities.

The congress debated the weakness of the party cadres inside Lithuania. Stasiūnas and Kaplanas argued for the sending of theoretically trained cadres from the Soviet Union into Lithuania to reinforce the party. The senior party leadership Angarietis and Kapsukas rejected the proposition, arguing that the party should be built from within the country. Per Angarietis the majority of Lithuanian communists in the Soviet Union lacked experience of underground activism, only a small number of political exiles from Lithuania would be suitable to send back into the country for party work. The guests representing the communist parties of the neighbouring countries (Stučka, Manner, Rästas) echoed the position of Angarietis and Kapsukas, stating that the modality of sending party cadres from the Soviet Union usually did not render the desired results.

== New Central Committee ==
On its final day the 4th party congress received Dmitry Manuilsky, who addressed the gathering on behalf of the Presidium of the Executive Committee of the Communist International (ECCI). After Manuilsky's speech the congress elected a new 9-member Central Committee by secret ballot. The new Central Committee consisted of Zigmas Angarietis, Vincas Kapsukas, Karolis Požela, Sergey Girinis, Faivušas Abramavičius, Juozas Greifenbergeris, Vincas Gervickas, Jonas Vilčinskas, Vilhelm Knorin (ECCI representative). Angaretis and Požela were elected secretaries of the Central Committee. The new Politburo included Angaretis, Kapsukas, Knorin, Požela and Girinis. The congress tasked the new Central Committee to elaborate a party programme.

== Aftermath ==
At the end of the congress the meeting adopted a communique to be sent to the Central Committee of the Russian Communist Party (Bolesheviks). The 4th party congress was concluded by the singing of the Internationale. Invitations to attend the congress of the Red International of Labour Unions (Profintern) were handed out to all congress delegates. Požela and Kaplanas would attend a MOPR conference in Moscow, held at the Bolshoi Theatre.

After delegates returned to Lithuania, meetings were held in local party branches to bring the decisions of the 4th party congress to the party organizations. The new Central Committee issued a number of appeals to disseminate the decisions of the 4th party congress, to workers of Lithuania, to workers in the Klaipėda Region, to political prisoners, to progressive Lithuanian in the United States, to Lithuanians in the Soviet Union.

The 4th party congress took place as power struggles were surging in the Russian Communist Party (Bolshevik), and the line adopted at the congress aligned the Lithuanian communists with the Russian currents opposed to Trotsky. As the 4th party congress confirmed the Bolshevik line of the Communist Party of Lithuania, its leading duo (Kapsukas and Angarietis) would serve key roles in the Communist International in subsequent years.
