= Proletarisher signal =

Proletarisher signal (transl. Proletarian Signal, Yiddish: פּראלעטארישער סיגנאל) was a Yiddish-language publication printed in Kaunas, Lithuania from 1925 to 1926. It was an organ of the Kaunas District Committee of the underground Communist Party of Lithuania. The publication was edited by Chaimas Kaplanas and Borisas Galperinas.

The circulation of Proletarisher signal was some 1,500 copies. It was printed at the clandestine printing house 'Spartako'. Copies were sold for 25 cents.

Three issues of Proletarisher signal were published. The first issue was published in August 1925, the second in December 1925 and the third issue was published in March 1926. Issues 1 and 2 were printed in 33-by-26-centimetre (13 in × 10 in) format, whilst the last issue was in 39-by-27-centimetre (15 in × 11 in) format.

Once Undzer emes ('Our Truth') began to be distributed inside Lithuania, the publication of Proletarisher signal was discontinued.
