= Štraln =

- December 31, 1940 issue of Štraln
- Native name: שטראלן
- Editors: M. Breneris, Izaokas Karlinas, Genrikas Zimanas, Dovydas Levinšteinas, Aronas Garonas
- Frequency: Biweekly, weekly
- Publisher: Central Committee of the Young Communist League of Lithuania (1940-1941)
- First issue: June 1, 1938; 87 years ago
- Final issue Number: June 16, 1941; 84 years ago 87
- Country: Lithuania
- Language: Yiddish

Štraln (Yiddish: שטראלן, 'Rays of Light') was a Yiddish language communist journal published from Kaunas, Lithuania between June 1, 1938 and June 16, 1941. All in all 87 issues of Štraln were published.

Štraln was published legally as a biweekly between June 1938 and February 1940. It functioned as an organ of the Central Committee of the underground Communist Party of Lithuania (LKP). Štraln carried the subtitle 'Illustrated bi-weekly youth magazine for arts, science and sports'. Issues were usually 24 pages long. Officially M. Breneris was the editor of the magazine, but Genrikas Zimanas was the real editor of the magazine during this period. Štraln was one of the prominent examples of communist publications that gained an influence among Jewish intellectuals and youth movements in Lithuania in period preceding World War II. Writer Jokūbas Josadė published his texts in Štraln during this period. In February 1940 Štraln was closed down by the state censorship authorities. A total of 38 issues had been published until then.

Štraln resumed publishing in July 1940, now as an organ of the Central Committee of the Young Communist League of Lithuania (LKJS). During this period the journal appeared rather regularly. The contents and graphic quality of the magazine had improved significantly after the relaunch, with the issues of the magazine carrying plenty of photos. The publication frequency shifted to weekly after a while.

Officially Izaokas Karlinas was the Štraln editor after the July 1940 relaunch, but the real editors of the magazine were Dovydas Levinšteinas (from July 1940) and Aronas Garonas (from December 1940). The journal printed literary works (mainly poems) of local writers and writers from other Soviet republics. Collaborators of Štraln included Feliksas Bieliauskas, Kušelis Eljaševas, Feliksas Gladutis and Judita Komodaitė.
