= Chaimas Kaplanas =

Lithuanian communist (1899–1989)

Kaplanas in c. 1974

Chaimas Kaplanas (Russian: Хаимас Капланас, Yiddish: חיים קאפלאן; 1899–1989) was a Lithuanian-Jewish communist revolutionary. Kaplanas held key leadership roles in the Communist Party of Lithuania in the 1920s, but was excluded from the party leadership in 1927.

== Biography ==
=== Early life ===
Kaplanas was born on June 20, 1899, in Kovno (Kaunas). At the age of 20, as a worker in Ukmergė during the days of the Socialist Soviet Republic of Lithuania and Belorussia (Litbel), Kaplanas joined the Communist Party of Lithuania and Belorussia in 1919. As the Litbel soviet republic collapsed later the same year, the two Communist Party cells in Ukmergė were forced underground. The Kaunas Party District Committee named Kaplanas as the new secretary of the Ukmergė Party Subdistrict Committee. Under Kaplanas' leadership the Ukmergė Party Subdistrict Committee undertook organization of trade union activities and distribution of illegal literature. They conducted propaganda work within the 7th Regiment of the Lithuanian Army.

=== Career ===
By mid-1920 the Bureau of the Central Committee of the Communist Party sent Kaplanas to Vilnius. He was active in party work in Vilnius. As the Red Army withdrew from Vilnius he shifted to Kaunas where he took part in underground organizing activities. In Kaunas he organized the Military Department of the Central Committee of the Communist Party of Lithuania (LKP). In February 1921 Kaplanas was arrested in Kaunas, and was subsequently imprisoned at Kaunas Prison. At Kaunas Prison the communist prisoners repeatedly went on hunger strikes, in protest against the death sentences issued by military tribunals against jailed revolutionaries and against illtreatment by the prison authorities. During his eight months of imprisonment Kaplanas took part in four hunger strikes. Kaplanas was released from jail on bail before trial. In September 1921 LKP sent him to Vilnius (then under Polish rule) were Kaplanas was placed in charge of organizing party cells in the area. He was inducted into the LKP Vilnius City Committee and the LKP District Committee.

In October 1922 Kaplanas left for Moscow, Soviet Russia in order to pursue studies at the Lithuanian Section of the Communist University of the National Minorities of the West. However, in 1923 he was recalled to Lithuania by LKP Central Committee Bureau, which sent him to Šiauliai and named him as the secretary of the Šiauliai Party District Committee. In 1924, as Lithuania had annexed the Klaipėda Region, Kaplanas travelled to the area along with other communist organizers. Together they built a LKP party organization in the area. Moreover, as an organizer of the underground party, Kaplanas visited different parts of Samogitia and worked on preparations for subdistrict party conferences. He was active in the Lithuanian Red Aid movement.

Kaplanas was elected as delegate of the Šiauliai Party District to the July 1924 4th Congress of the Communist Party of Lithuania, held in Moscow. Kaplanas travelled clandestinely to Soviet Russia via Latvia. In the Soviet capital he also attended the 3rd congress of the Red International of Labour Unions (Profintern) as a delegate and the 1st conference of MOPR, the latter event being held at the Bolshoi Theatre.

By late 1924 Kaplanas was named Kaunas Party District Committee secretary. He remained in this position until 1927. By mid-1925 he was inducted into the LKP Central Committee as a candidate member. During this period Kaplanas was active in organizing underground press publishing activities. Together with M. Slivka, Kaplanas set up an underground Yiddish printing press in a house on Veiverių gatvė in Kaunas. Between 1925 and 1926 he was the editor the Yiddish-language LKP Kaunas District Committee organ Proletarisher signal. Once Undzer emes began to be distributed inside Lithuania, the publication of Proletarisher signal was discontinued.

In 1926 he went into exile in the German city Königsberg, along with other LKP cadres. In Germany Kaplanas worked on printing materials and organizing the smuggling of communist literature into Lithuania. The January 6, 1927 plenum of LKP, the first major party gathering after the December 1926 coup d'état in Lithuania, inducted Kaplanas into the Central Committee as a full member. Around this time his underground party name was 'Moricas'.

The Kaunas Party District elected Kaplanas as one of its delegates to the 4th LKP party conference, held in Moscow September 10-October, 1927. At the 4th party conference Kaplanas presented a report on the work among national minorities. Around this time Kaplanas tried to remain neutral in the inner-party conflict between the two main LKP leaders Vincas Kapsukas and Zigmas Angarietis, but appeared as favouring Kapsukas. During the process to elect the new Central Committee, Angarietis appealed to the conference not to elect Kaplanas. Kaplanas' candidacy was unsuccessful. Kaplanas was notably upset over the outcome of the party conference, with the proceedings records noting that he had banged his fist in rage.

=== Later years ===
Kaplanas would remain in Moscow after the party conference, and would no longer be a LKP party member. He worked and studied in Moscow, graduating from the Industrial Academy. Kaplanas served in the Red Army between 1941 and 1945. When the 16th Lithuanian Division was formed in May 1942, he was inducted into it and sent to the frontline.

After demobilization, Kaplanas began working in a managerial role in the Union of Consumers Societies of the Lithuanian SSR (Litpotrebsoyuz) in Vilnius. He retired in 1959. As of 1971, the then-retired Kaplanas was a member of the LKP Primary Organization at the Kaunas State Historical Museum. Kaplanas died on February 8, 1989.

== Bibliography ==
- Ch. Kaplanas. Kareivinėse neramu; iš atsiminimų, 1918-1927. [Literatūrinis bendraautoris P. Kirijenka], Vilnius, Valstybinė grožinės literatūros leidykla, 1961
- Ch. Kaplanas, Juozas Chlivickas, Žvalgas kasdien pavojuje, 1972
