= Čepulis =

- Lithuanian surname
- m.: Čepulis
- f.: (unmarried): Čepulytė
- f.: (married): Čepulienė

Čepulis is a Lithuanian surname derived from the name which is a diminutive for the names Čepas, Čepis, Čepys. Notable people with the surname include:

- Arvydas Čepulis, Lithuanian basketball player
- Jonas Čepulis (1939–2015), Lithuanian amateur heavyweight boxer

== See also ==
- Čepaitis, a patronymic from Čepas
