= Social Democratic Labour Party of Lithuania and Belorussia (internationalists) =

The Social Democratic Labour Party of Lithuania and Belorussia (internationalists) (Lithuanian: Lietuvos ir Baltarusijos socialdemokratų darbininkų partija (internacionalistų)) was a political party based in Vilna. The party had a Menshevik-Internationalist line. The party was led by S. Girinis.

The party emerged as a local group in Vilna of the Russian Social Democratic Labour Party (Mensheviks). During the spring of 1918, the group took part the united internationalist social democrat platform in Vilna (along with former members of the Lithuanian Social Democratic Party and the small communist cell).

Later, after a section of Polish social democrats split away from the group, it was reorganized as the 'Social Democratic Labour Party of Lithuania and Belorussia (internationalists)'. The party published Novaya era ('New Era') in Russian language.

The party had a certain influence among workers in Vilna. Ahead of the December 1918 election to the Vilna Soviet of Workers Deputies, the party formed a temporary bloc with the Communist Party of Lithuania and Belorussia, the Lithuanian Social Democratic Party, the General Jewish Labour Bund and others. The party won 22 seats in the Vilna Soviet. On December 15, 1918 one Menshevik-Internationalist, E. Sokofovskis, was elected to the nine-member Presidium of the Vilna Soviet. On December 22, 1918 the Menshevik-Internationalists presented a motion (which supported by the various non-communist parties) in the Vilna Soviet, refusing to cede power to the Provisional Revolutionary Workers and Peasants Government of Lithuania and instead called for an assembly of Soviets and that the Vilna Soviet would provisionally would constitute the government.

When the Vilna Soviet was reconstituted in February 1919, the party won nine seats. At the first meeting of the Vilna Soviet after the election one Menshevik-Internationalist was included in the Central Executive Committee of the Vilna Soviet (along with 16 communists and 3 Bundists).

A single Menshevik-Internationalist delegate (out of a total of 221 delegates) took part in the First Congress of Soviets of Lithuania held February 18-20, 1919, an event that endorsed the creation of the Socialist Soviet Republic of Lithuania and Belorussia (SSR LiB). When the Central Executive Committee of the SSR LiB was created on February 27, 1919 the Menshevik-Internationalists would hold one of the 100 seats.

The party was liquidated in 1919, following the example of the Russian Menshevik-Internationalists. In 1920 a section of former members of the party joined the Communist Party of Lithuania.

Following the end of SSR LiB, Menshevik-Internationalists would operate an 'International Club' with a canteen at 20, Vilniaus gatvė.
