= Steppes electoral district =

Constituency of the Russian Republic

Steppes
- Former Civilian constituency for the All-Russian Constituent Assembly
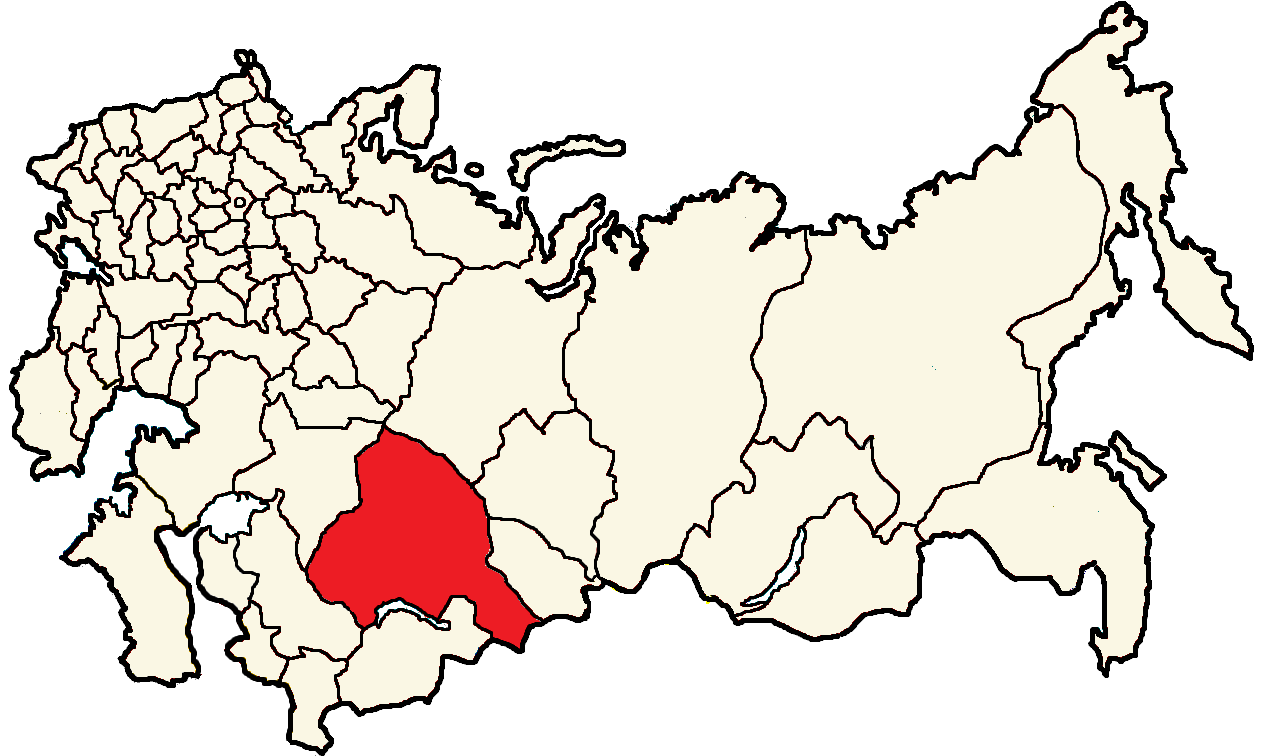

Former constituency
- Created: 1917
- Abolished: 1918
- Number of members: 14
- Number of Uyezd Electoral Commissions: 10
- Number of Urban Electoral Commissions: 3
- Number of Parishes: 384

The Steppes electoral district (Russian: Степной избирательный округ) was a constituency created for the 1917 Russian Constituent Assembly election. The electoral district covered the Akmolinsk Oblast and the Semipalatinsk Oblast. According to Wade (2004), it is unclear whether the election was carried through to completion in the electoral district.

== Lists in the fray ==
Fourteen lists contested the election in the Steppes;

- No. 1 - Cossacks
- No. 2 - Clergy and laity
- No. 3 - Bolsheviks
- No. 4 - Internationalists
- No. 5 - Alash
- No. 6 - Kadets
- No. 7 - Tatars
- No. 8 – Socialist-Revolutionaries
- No. 9 – Socialist Cossacks
- No. 10 – United Socialists
- No. 11 – Kirghiz Socialists
- No. 12 – Germans
- No. 13 – Muslim Democrats
- No. 14 – Clergy and Laity of Petropavlovsk

== Campaigning ==
=== Bolshevik Party ===
The Bolshevik list (no. 3) included V.M. Kosarev, A.A. Zvezdov, V.V. Tarakanov and V.S. Gorshkov as some of its candidates. The Omsk Soviet of Workers and Soldiers Deputies appealed to workers and peasants to vote for the Bolshevik list. Bolshevik agitations called for established of soviet power whilst campaigning for the Constituent Assembly ballot. The newspaper Revolyotsionnaya mysl' ('Revolutionary Thought') played an important role in the Bolshevik campaign.

Attempting to break the SR monopoly among the peasantry, the Bolsheviks in Omsk sent out some twenty railway workshop labourers and twenty soldiers to Akmolinsk Oblast and Tobolsk Governorate (being a separate electoral district) to campaign among the peasants.

=== Socialist-Revolutionary Party ===
In the run up to the elections, the Socialist-Revolutionary Party was split as an Omsk-based left-wing group led by N. Ishmaev broke away. However, even after the departure of the leftists the SRs suffered internal divisions. On October 17, 1917 the West Siberian Soviet of Peasants Deputies Executive Committee held a meeting and decided to field the right-wing SR leader P. Derber as candidate for the Constituent Assembly election. But a group of right-wing SRs in the Omsk Provincial SR Party Council opposed Derber's candidature, arguing that his moral standing was questionable.

The West Siberian Soviet of Peasants Deputies received a major financial boost from the Ministry of Education, which provided some 3 million Russian rubles for anti-Bolshevik agitation in the lead up to the vote.

== Results ==
The account of U.S. historian Oliver Henry Radkey, used as source for the results table below, only includes votes from Omsk and surroundings.

Steppe (only Omsk and surroundings)
Party	Vote	%
List 3 - Bolsheviks	11,681	37.71
List 6 - Kadets	4,925	15.90
List 10 - United Socialists (Mensheviks-Rightwing Socialist Bloc)	4,712	15.21
List 8 - Socialist-Revolutionaries	4,018	12.97
List 11 - Kirghiz Socialists	1,841	5.94
List 4 - Menshevik-Internationalists	1,660	5.36
List 1 - Cossack	1,069	3.45
List 2 - [Orthodox] Clergy and Laymen	555	1.79
List 5 - Alash	181	0.58
List 7 - Tatars	?	
List 9 - Cossacks-Socialists	?	
List 12 - Germans	?	
List 13 - Muslim-Democrats	?	
List 14 - [Orthodox] Clergy and Laymen of Petropavlovsk	?	
Unaccounted	332	1.07
Total:	30,974	

This account of the vote in Semipalatinsk uyezd comes from the work of Soviet historian L. M. Spirin.

Steppe (only Semipalatinsk uezd)
Party	Vote	%
List 5 - Alash	58,331	85.63
List 8 - Socialist-Revolutionaries	3,375	4.95
List 1 - Cossack	3,136	4.60
List 3 - Bolsheviks	1,910	2.80
List 9 - Cossacks-Socialists	475	0.70
List 7 - Tatars	468	0.69
List 2 - [Orthodox] Clergy and Laymen	150	0.22
List 4 - Menshevik-Internationalists	115	0.17
List 6 - Kadets	106	0.16
List 10 - United Socialists (Mensheviks-Rightwing Socialist Bloc)	19	0.03
List 13 - Muslim-Democrats	14	0.02
List 12 - Germans	11	0.02
List 14 - [Orthodox] Clergy and Laymen of Petropavlovsk	5	0.01
List 11 - Kirghiz Socialists	2	0.00
Total:	68,117	
