= Sąjūdis rally (1988) =

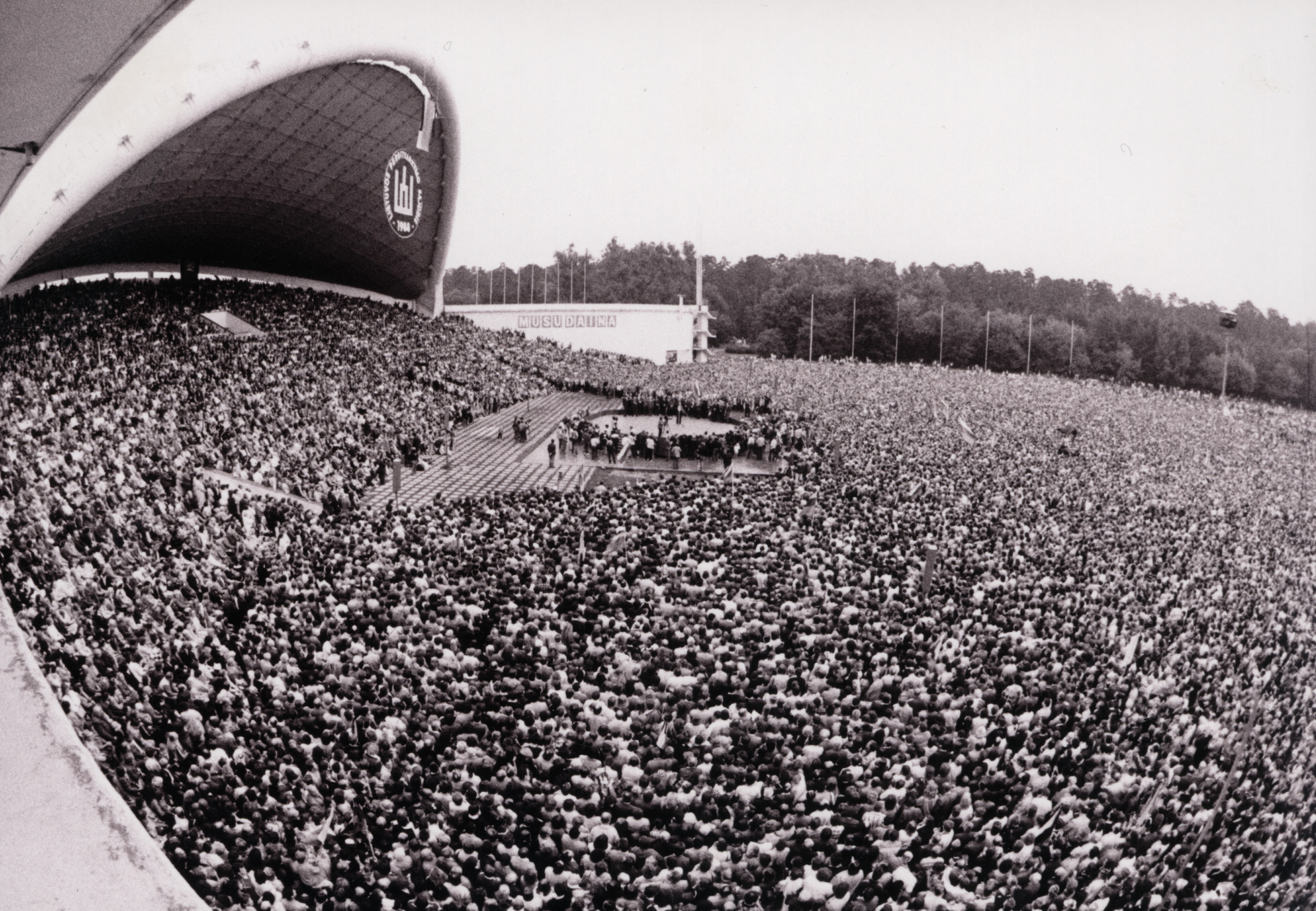
A rally in Lithuania commemorate and condemn the Molotov-Ribbentrop Pact, August 23, 1988, Vilnius, Vingis Park

The Sąjūdis rally was a commemoration event organized by the Lithuanian Reform Movement (Sąjūdis) in Vingis Park, Vilnius, Lithuanian SSR, to mark the anniversary of the Molotov-Ribbentrop Pact. The rally took place on August 23, 1988, and was attended by approximately 250,000 people.

== Organization and Location ==
Initially, the rally was planned to be held in Cathedral Square, where protests and a hunger strike organized by the Lithuanian Freedom League had been taking place since mid-August, demanding the release of political prisoners. However, the Central Committee of the Communist Party of Lithuania refused to grant permission for Cathedral Square, instead suggesting Vingis Park. The Sąjūdis leadership agreed on the condition that they be allowed to announce the location change on television. The televised announcement was made by Vytautas Landsbergis, who also referenced the conspiracy between Joseph Stalin and Adolf Hitler and their crimes.

== Speeches and Key Participants ==
During the rally, several prominent figures spoke, including:

- Vytautas Landsbergis, chairman of Sąjūdis
- Vladislovas Mikučiauskas, Minister of Foreign Affairs of the Lithuanian SSR
- Historian Gediminas Rudys, who emphasized the necessity of open discussion on the so-called 1940 socialist revolution in Lithuania, arguing that there was no revolutionary situation at the time
- Historian Liudas Truska, who expressed doubts about the nature of the 1940 revolutions in the Baltic states

Antanas Buračas, who protested against the Soviet Union’s control over Lithuanian affairs, particularly the construction of the third unit of the Ignalina Nuclear Power Plant. He also proposed drafting a new republican constitution, an idea supported by then-chairman of the Supreme Soviet of the Lithuanian SSR, Lionginas Šepetys, who noted that the ongoing Soviet reforms could lead to the transformation of the USSR into a federal state

Among the cultural figures who spoke at the rally were:

- Writers Vytautas Petkevičius, Virgilijus Čepaitis, and Kazys Saja
- Poets Sigitas Geda and Jonas Kalinauskas
- Actor Ramūnas Abukevičius
- Philosopher Arvydas Juozaitis
- Composer Julius Juzeliūnas
- Film director Arūnas Žebriūnas
- Priest Edmundas Atkočiūnas
- Poet Justinas Marcinkevičius demanded the publication of the Molotov-Ribbentrop Pact and its secret protocols in the Soviet press.

== Historical Footage and Anthem ==
During the event, historical footage was shown, featuring former Lithuanian Minister of Foreign Affairs (1938–1940) Juozas Urbšys discussing his meeting with Stalin in Moscow and the Soviet leader’s ultimatum to Lithuania. The Lithuanian national anthem, "Tautiška giesmė," was sung by the crowd.

== Conclusion and Confrontation with Authorities ==
The rally ended just before midnight with a candle-lighting ceremony in memory of the victims of Soviet oppression. Some participants proceeded to Cathedral Square to join the hunger strikers. However, under orders from Minister of Internal Affairs Romas Lisauskas, militia and military forces surrounded the square, preventing demonstrators from reaching the hunger strikers. Clashes ensued, with police pushing back the protesters. After midnight, Lisauskas met with Landsbergis and allowed small groups to visit the hunger strikers in turns. By around 3 a.m., the crowd dispersed, and tensions eased.
