= Icikas Meskupas-Adomas =

Leader of Lithuanian Komsomol and Communist Party in interwar Lithuania

Icikas Meskupas pseudonym Adomas (20 August 1907 – 13 March 1942) was a leader of the Lithuanian Komsomol and Communist Party in interwar Lithuania. He was elected to the People's Seimas and the Supreme Soviet of the Soviet Union. He became the second secretary of the party in February 1941. For his communist activities, he was arrested and imprisoned several times by Lithuania and once by Nazi Germany. During World War II, he joined the Soviet partisans and was killed in a shootout with the Lithuanian police.

== Early life ==
Meskupas was born in Ukmergė, then part of the Russian Empire, to a family of a Lithuanian Jewish tailor. Two of his uncles were active in the communist movement and he joined the Lithuanian Komsomol in late 1924 while still a high school student. At the time, the Communist Party and various communist activities were outlawed in Lithuania. In 1926, he graduation from the Jewish Gymnasium in Ukmergė and enrolled at the University of Kaunas studying to become a math teacher. After the coup of December 1926, many communists were arrested. Meskupas became a member of the central committee of Kaunas city and a secretary of Kaunas county Komsomol.

In October 1928, the 10th anniversary of the October Revolution, Lithuanian intelligence arrested several Komsomol members including Meskupas. He was tried in February 1929 and sentenced to eight years in prison, but the sentence was reduced to two years as he was still a minor. There were many other communists imprisoned in Kaunas Prison. It was here that Meskupas obtained his informal communist education and read classical communist texts, including The Communist Manifesto, The State and Revolution, and Capital, Volume I.

== Communist career ==
Upon his release, Meskupas joined the central committee of the Lithuanian Komsomol and was sent to Berlin by the Communist Party of Lithuania in July 1931. There he attended the University of Berlin and organized the publishing of various communist newspapers (Balsas, Komunistas, Partijos darbas, Undzer emes, Darbininkų jaunimas) and their smuggling into Lithuania. Communist activities in Berlin ceased after the Nazi takeover in early 1933. Meskupas was arrested in May 1933 by the Gestapo and imprisoned in Tilsit (now Sovetsk). He was released in April 1934 and returned to Kaunas where he joined the central committee of the Komsomol and the secretariat of the Communist Party. They launched a campaign to attract new members and published newspapers Šturminė kampanija (July–August 1934) and Darbininkų ir valstiečių jaunimas which were edited by Meskupas. He also became the editor of Tiesa, the official voice of the Communist Party. In summer 1935, he attended the Seventh World Congress of the Comintern as an advisory delegate. At the same time, he represented Lithuania at a plenum session of the International Red Aid (instead of Feiga Zaraitė who could not attend). Later, in September–October 1935, he was a delegate to the Sixth Congress of the Young Communist International.

He became a member of the central committee of the Communist Party in August 1935 and of its politburo in January 1938. Meskupas was arrested and imprisoned three other times, in October 1935 for one month and 10 days, in June 1936 for three months, and in May 1938 for ten months. Lithuanian contacts with the Comintern were terminated when Zigmas Angarietis, their contact person, was executed during the Great Purge. Antanas Sniečkus, the first secretary of the Communist Party, spent much of 1938–1939 in hiding from both the Lithuanian police and the Soviet NKVD and refused invitations to appear in Moscow. In December 1939, Meskupas was sent to reestablish these contacts and report on their activities for the past few years. Comintern found Lithuanian efforts to be satisfactory and according to the general party line.

In June 1940, Lithuania was occupied by the Soviet Union and lost its independence. The Soviets observed semi-constitutional formalities of transforming independent Lithuania into the Lithuanian SSR. Meskupas was elected to the People's Seimas, a rubber-stamp parliament that adopted a resolution of transforming Lithuania into a soviet socialist republic and applying for the membership in the Soviet Union. He was a member of the delegation sent to Moscow to present the resolution to the Supreme Soviet of the Soviet Union. In January 1941, he was one of the 35 Lithuanian delegates elected to the Supreme Soviet of the Soviet Union. In February, he became the second secretary of the Communist Party of the Lithuanian SSR.

== Brief partisan life ==
In June 1941, Nazi Germany invaded the Soviet Union and Meskupas, along with many other communists, evacuated to Russia. In Moscow, he formed a 15-member operative group that prepared for operations deep behind the enemy line. Almost all the men were politically active in the Communist Party or the Komsomol of Lithuania before the German invasion. At the time, the communists intended to reestablish the party in Lithuania – they prioritized political work and agitation over partisan warfare. The group was split into two sub-groups: Meskupas' sub-group was to be active in northern Lithuania and Juozas Daškauskas' sub-group in southeastern Lithuania. Meskupas was eager to depart, even promising to walk the distance, but various setbacks (Battle of Moscow, airplane malfunction, lukewarm reception by the NKVD) delayed his departure to 7 March 1942. Daškauskas' sub-group of six men departed on 17 March.

Meskupas along with nine others was airlifted and parachuted near Bauska, Latvia, about 100 kilometres (62 mi) north of their intended destination of Rokiškis District. Two men were killed in a shootout on landing, two others were captured and executed on the spot. On 12 March, the remaining six men reached the environs of Nemunėlio Radviliškis and asked a local forester for food and directions. The forester later alerted the Lithuanian police which sent seven policemen and four civilians to investigate. Meskupas' group was easy to track as the snow had not yet melted. All six men were killed in the ensuing brief shootout near Smailiai village. Daškauskas' sub-group did not fare better: all men, except for Vytautas Bieliauskas who went into deep hiding, were killed on 11–12 April. The Soviets did not know the fate of these men until they captured archives of the Lithuanian police at the end of the war.

== Legacy ==
In 1954, Meskupas and his men were reburied in the military section of the Antakalnis Cemetery. In 1965, Meskupas was posthumously awarded the Order of the Patriotic War (1st class). Two streets, in Kaunas and his native Ukmergė, as well as a furniture factory in Ukmergė were named in his honor. His memorial bust (sculptor Leonas Žuklys, architect Sigizmundas Pipynė) was unveiled in Ukmergė in May 1976. The bust was removed soon after the Lithuania's declaration of independence in March 1990 and was transferred to the Grūtas Park.
