= Sąjūdis =

Reform Movement of Lithuania Lietuvos Persitvarkymo Sąjūdis
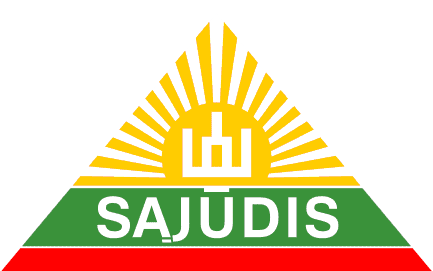
- Abbreviation: LPS (Sąjūdis)
- Leader: Vytautas Landsbergis (1988–1990)
- Founded: 23 October 1988; 38 years ago
- Headquarters: Vilnius
- Ideology: Lithuanian nationalism Anti-communism; Anti-Sovietism; Democratization
- Political position: Big tent
- Slogan: For Lithuania
- Seimas: 0 / 141
- European Parliament: 0 / 11
- Municipal councils: 0 / 1,498
- Mayors: 0 / 60

Website
- http://www.lietsajudis.lt/

The Sąjūdis (Lithuanian: [ˈsâːjuːdʲɪs], lit. 'Movement'), initially known as the Reform Movement of Lithuania (Lithuanian: Lietuvos Persitvarkymo Sąjūdis), is a political organisation which led the struggle for Lithuanian independence in the late 1980s and early 1990s. It was established on 3 June 1988 as the first opposition party in Soviet Lithuania, and was led by Vytautas Landsbergis. Its goal was to seek the return of independent status for Lithuania.

Sąjūdžio veliaveles Vytis 1989

== Historical background ==
In the mid-1980s, Lithuania's Communist Party leadership hesitated to embrace Gorbachev's perestroika and glasnost. The death of Petras Griškevičius, first secretary of the Communist Party of Lithuania, in 1987 was merely followed by the appointment of another rigid communist, Ringaudas Songaila. However, encouraged by the rhetoric of Mikhail Gorbachev, noting the strengthening position of Solidarity in Poland and encouraged by the Pope and the U.S. Government, Baltic independence activists began to hold public demonstrations in Riga, Tallinn, and Vilnius.

== Formation ==
At a meeting at the Lithuanian Academy of Sciences on 3 June 1988, communist and non-communist intellectuals formed Sąjūdis Initiative Group (Lithuanian: Sąjūdžio iniciatyvinė grupė) to organise a movement to support Gorbachev's program of glasnost, democratisation, and perestroika. The group was composed of 35 members, mostly artists. 17 of the group members were also communist party members. Its goal was to organise the Sąjūdis Reform Movement, which became known subsequently simply as Sąjūdis.

On 21 June 1988, the first massive gathering organised by Sąjūdis took place at Soviet Square near Soviet Palace. Three days later, a gathering took place in Gediminas' Square. There, delegates to the 19th All-Union Conference of the Communist Party of the Soviet Union were instructed about Sąjūdis's goals.

About 100,000 people in Vingis Park greeted the delegates when they came back in July. Another massive event took place on 23 August 1988, when about 250,000 people gathered to protest against the Molotov–Ribbentrop pact and its secret protocol.

On 19 June 1988, the first issue of samizdat newspaper "Sąjūdis News" (Lithuanian: Sąjūdžio žinios) was published. In September, Sąjūdis published a legal newspaper, "Atgimimas" (English: rebirth). In total, about 150 different newspapers were printed supporting Sąjūdis.

As stated in the first issues of “Atgimimas”, Sąjūdis was perceived as the reformist initiative by the intellectual authorities with a goal to start the national awakening.

In October 1988, Sąjūdis held its founding conference in Vilnius. It elected a 35-member council. Most of its members were members of the initiative group. Vytautas Landsbergis, a professor of musicology, who was not a member of the communist party, became the council's chairman.

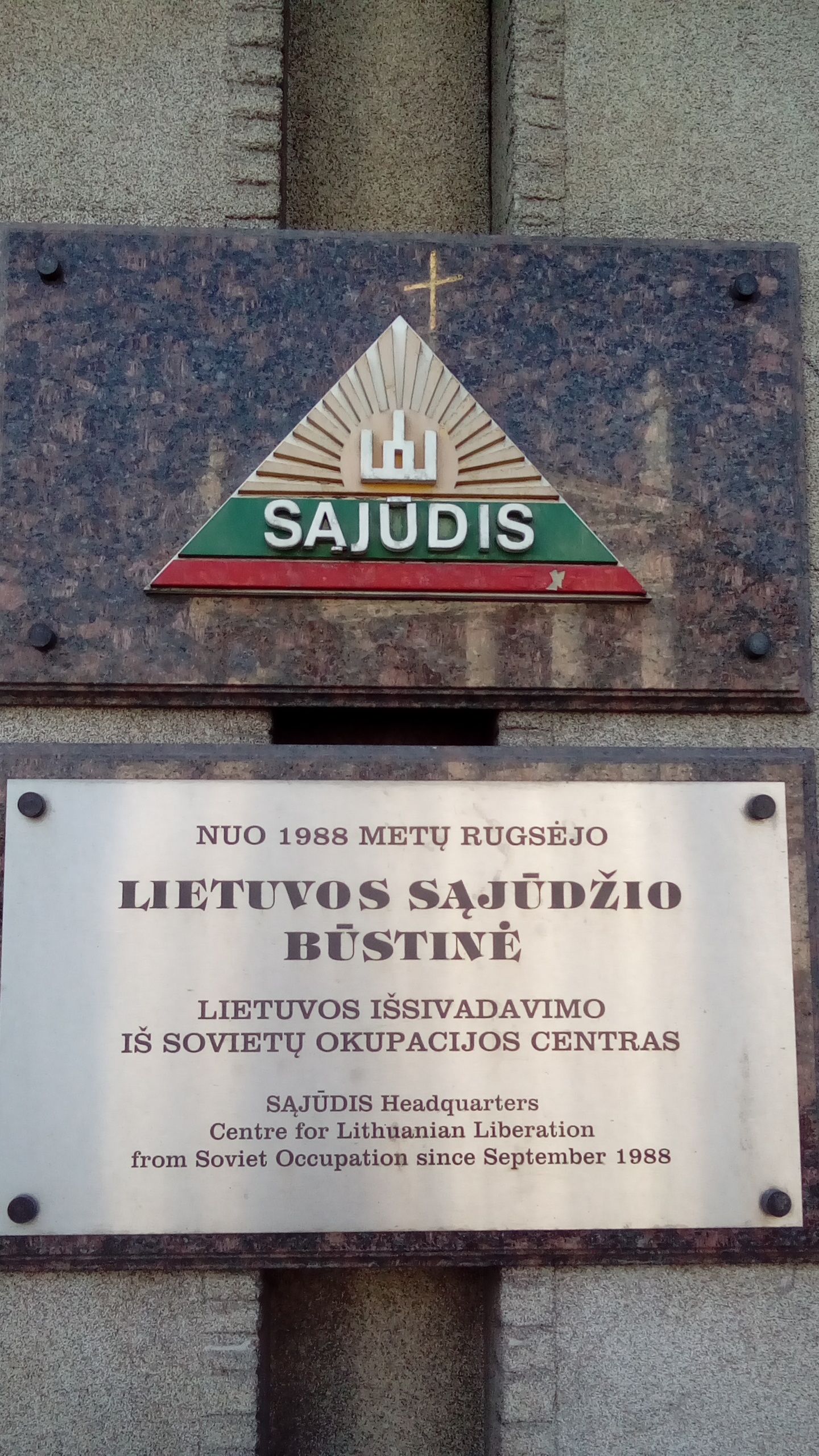
Sajudis plaque at old headquarters of the movement, now Ireland's embassy. Vilnius, 1 Šventaragio g.

== Activities ==
The movement supported Gorbachev's policies, but at the same time promoted Lithuanian national issues, such as restoration of the Lithuanian language as the official language. Its demands included the revelation of truth about the Stalinist years, protection of the environment, the halt on the construction of a third nuclear reactor at the Ignalina nuclear power plant, and disclosure of the secret protocols of the Nazi-Soviet Non-aggression Pact, signed in 1939.

Sąjūdis used mass meetings to advance its goals. At first, Communist Party leaders shunned these meetings, but by mid-1988, their participation became a political necessity. A Sąjūdis rally on 24 June 1988 was attended by Algirdas Brazauskas, then party secretary for industrial affairs. In October 1988, Brazauskas was appointed first secretary of the communist party to replace Songaila. Communist leaders threatened to crack down on Sąjūdis, but backed down in the face of mass protests. Sąjūdis candidates fared well in elections to the Congress of People's Deputies, the newly created Soviet legislative body. Their candidates won in 36 of the 40 districts in which they ran.

In February 1989, Sąjūdis declared that Lithuania had been forcibly annexed by the Soviet Union and that the group's ultimate goal was the restoration of Lithuanian independence. Lithuanian sovereignty was proclaimed in May 1989, and Lithuania's incorporation into the Soviet Union was declared illegal.

On 23 August 1989, the 50th anniversary of the signing of the Nazi–Soviet Molotov–Ribbentrop Pact, a 600-kilometre, two-million-strong human chain reaching from Tallinn to Vilnius focused international attention on the aspirations of the Baltic nations. This demonstration and the coordinated efforts of the three nations became known as the Baltic Way. Days after the rally, the federal Supreme Soviet soon made public its admission of the forced accession of the Baltic republics.

In December, the Communist Party of Lithuania seceded from the Communist Party of the Soviet Union and agreed to give up its monopoly on power. In February 1990, Sąjūdis representatives (or candidates that were supported by the movement) won an absolute majority (101 seats out of 141) in the Supreme Council of the Lithuanian SSR. Vytautas Landsbergis was elected chairman of the Supreme Council. This led to the declaration of the restoration of independence on 11 March 1990, with Landsbergis becoming the first leader of a restored Lithuania.

== After independence ==
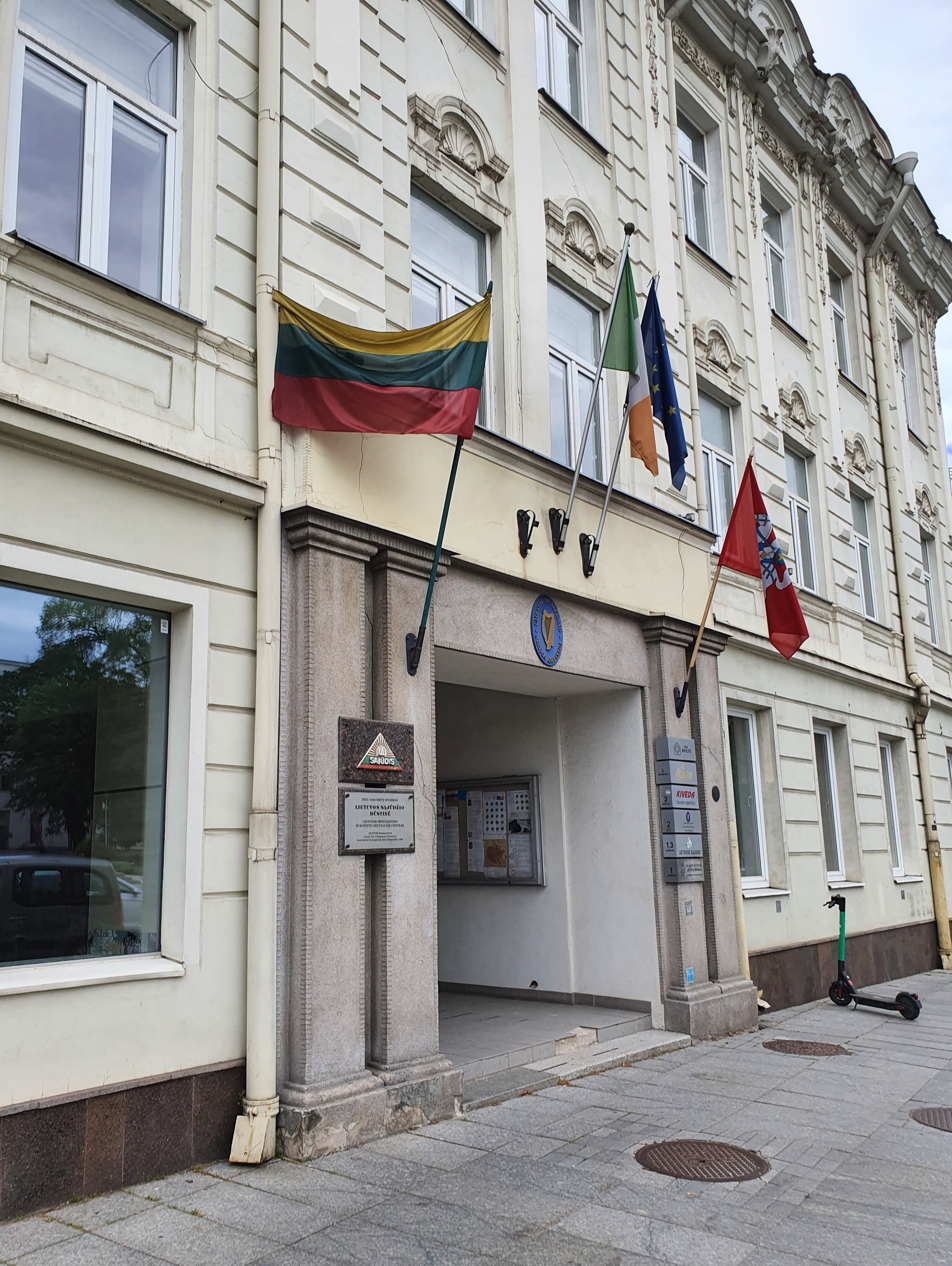
Headquarters of Sąjūdis in Vilnius

Today, Sąjūdis is still active in Lithuania, but it has lost almost all its influence.

With independence gained, reform communists and Vilnius liberal intellectuals left Sąjūdis about a month later. One of the reasons for this event was a growing nationalist rhetoric. Some members formed the new Independence Party, while liberal-leaning members helped to found the Liberal Union of Lithuania. As a result, the movement, still led by its founder V. Landsbergis, mostly included members from the Kaunas faction, who were inclined to "differentiate the local population into two clear groups, 'patriots' and 'communists'". The popularity of Sąjūdis waned as it failed to maintain unity among people with different political beliefs and was ineffective in handling the economic crisis.

Moreover, Sąjūdis lost major support from the rural regions of Lithuania, as they proposed agricultural and land reforms without the input and against the interests of most kolkhoz employees and workers. Sąjūdis retained support in Kaunas and Panevėžys.

In the late summer of 1992, Sąjūdis and several minor parties and movements formed an electoral coalition, "For democratic Lithuania". However, the Democratic Labour Party (DLP; the former Communist Party of Lithuania) was victorious in the Seimas elections of that year.

Many of the group, including Landsbergis, formed the core of the Homeland Union, now the largest centre-right party in Lithuania.

== Members of Sąjūdis Initiative Group ==
- Aloyzas Sakalas
- Regimantas Adomaitis
- Vytautas Bubnys
- Juozas Bulavas
- Antanas Buračas
- Algimantas Čekuolis
- Virgilijus Čepaitis
- Vaclovas Daunoras
- Sigitas Geda
- Bronius Genzelis
- Arvydas Juozaitis
- Julius Juzeliūnas
- Algirdas Kaušpėdas
- Česlovas Kudaba
- Bronius Kuzmickas
- Vytautas Landsbergis
- Bronius Leonavičius
- Meilė Lukšienė
- Alfonsas Maldonis
- Justinas Marcinkevičius
- Alvydas Medalinskas
- Jokūbas Minkevičius
- Algimantas Nasvytis
- Romualdas Ozolas
- Romas Pakalnis
- Saulius Pečiulis
- Vytautas Petkevičius
- Kazimira Prunskienė
- Vytautas Radžvilas
- Raimundas Rajeckas
- Artūras Skučas
- Gintaras Songaila
- Arvydas Šaltenis
- Vitas Tomkus
- Zigmas Vaišvila
- Arūnas Žebriūnas

== Election results ==
=== Congress of People's Deputies of the Soviet Union ===
Election year	Leader	Seats	+/–
1989 (Note: Did not contest as a political party but rather endorsed an assortment of non-partisan candidates based on their personal merits.)	Vytautas Landsbergis	36 / 42	New

=== Supreme Council – Reconstituent Seimas ===
Election year	Leader	Seats	+/–	Status
1990 (Note: Did not contest as a political party but rather endorsed an assortment of non-partisan candidates and candidates of various other political parties based on their personal merits.)	Vytautas Landsbergis	91 / 141	New	Government

=== Seimas ===
Election year	Leader	Votes	% (place)	Seats	+/–	Status
1992	Vytautas Landsbergis	393,502	21.17 (#2)	30 / 141	▼61	Opposition

== See also ==
- Latvian National Independence Movement
- Popular Front of Estonia
- Popular Front of Latvia
- Singing Revolution
- Belarusian Popular Front
