= Nikolai Mitkin =

Soviet politician (1929–1998)

- Николай Митькин
- Born: 13 March 1929; Ivina, Leningrad Region, USSR
- Died: 9 February 1998 (aged 68)
- Education: 1953 Karelian-Finnish University; 1968 Academy of the Social Sciences of the Communist Party of the Soviet Union
- Office: 2nd Secretary of the Communist Party of Lithuania

Nikolai Mitkin (Lithuanian: Nikolajus Mitkinas, Russian: Николай Андреевич Митькин, 13 March 1929 – 9 February 1998) was a figure of the Communist Party of the Soviet Union.

== Biography ==
In 1953, Mitkin graduated from the Karelia-Finnish University. In 1954, he joined the Communist Party of the Soviet Union (CPSU). From 1959 to 1961, he worked at the Karelian Regional Committee of CPSU. Later, he was secretary (1961–1963) and 2nd secretary (1963–1965) of the Petrozavodsk city committee of the CPSU. In 1968, he graduated from the Academy of the Social Sciences of the Communist Party of the Soviet Union and became a candidate of historical sciences. He then worked as a lecturer at the Karelian Regional Committee of CPSU (1968–1969) and instructor of the Central Committee of CPSU (1969–1984). In 1986, he became the Second Secretary of the Communist Party of Lithuania (CPL), joined the Central Committee and the Bureau of CPL. He was also elected to the Supreme Soviet of the Lithuanian SSR.

In the Lithuanian SSR, Mitkin worked to suppress the independence movement. In January–February 1988, he coordinated actions against commemoration of Lithuania's independence day on February 16. He unsuccessfully tried to prevent the establishment of Sąjūdis, openly calling it fascist and demanding that its members be expelled from the communist party. In 1988, due to his staunch belief in Marxism-Leninism and personal ambitions, his resignation was demanded by employees of the Lithuanian Academy of Sciences and participants in Sąjūdis' rallies. On 28 September 1988, on Mitkin's initiative and with the approval of the first secretary of CPL Ringaudas Songaila, special units of the Internal Troops of the Soviet Union were used against the participants of a peaceful rally organized by the Lithuanian Liberty League. In October 1988, Mitkin was dismissed from his duties by a decision of the Central Committee of the CPL. It was the first time that CPL overrode decisions of the Central Committee of CPSU.

Party political offices
Preceded by Nikolajus Dybenka	2nd Secretary of the Communist Party of Lithuania; 1986 to 1988	Succeeded by Vladimir Beriozov
