= Sergey Girinis =

Soviet revolutionary, journalist and trade unionist (1882–1961)

- Sergejus Girinis
- Born: Raul Isaakovich Ginzburg; 10 April 1882; Prisele, Roslavlsky Uyezd, Smolensk Governorate
- Died: 8 September 1961 (aged 79); Moscow, Soviet Union
- Occupations: Trade unionist, journalist
- Political party: All-Union Communist Party
- Other political affiliations: Russian Social Democratic Labour Party; Inter-District Organisation of United Social-Democrats; Russian Social Democratic Labour Party (Mensheviks); Social Democratic Labour Party of Lithuania and Belorussia; Communist Party of Lithuania and Belorussia; Communist Party of Lithuania
- Movement: Labour, Menshevik-Internationalist

Sergey Vladimirovich Girinis (Lithuanian: Sergejus Girinis, Russian: Сергей Владимирович Гиринис, 1882–1961), until 1919 known as Raul Isaakovich Ginzburg (Lithuanian: Raulas Ginsburgas, Russian: Рауль Исаакович Гинцбург), was a Soviet revolutionary, journalist and trade unionist. He was a leading figure in the labour movement in Vilna (Vilnius) in the 1910s, adhering to a Menshevik-Internationalist line. He later joined the Communist Party of Lithuania. After a prisoner exchange, he was based in Moscow and represented Lithuanian trade unions in the Red International of Labour Unions (Profintern). Girinis was a prolific writer, authoring different works on political theory and history.

== Early life ==
Raul Ginzburg was born on 10 April 1882 in Prisele village, Roslavlsky Uyezd, Smolensk Governorate. After graduating from the Smolensk Gymnasium in 1900–1901, Ginzburg went on to study at the Saint Petersburg Conservatory. There he became involved in the revolutionary movement and he soon found himself expelled from the conservatory.

In 1901, he went into exile in Geneva, Switzerland, where he continued his studies. In Geneva, he befriended Georgi Plekhanov, who became a key political inspiration for Ginzburg. Ginzburg joined the Russian Social Democratic Labour Party. In early 1902, Ginzburg returned to Russia (to Roslavl) and smuggled illegal Marxist literature. He was arrested by the Czarist authorities in March 1902 for his political activities, then exiled to eastern Siberia.

Having spent almost three years in Siberia, Ginzburg returned to his home region by early 1905. He took part in the Roslavl Group of Internationalists led by the zemstvo doctor M. A. Rivkin. During the 1905 Russian Revolution, Ginzburg was active in Bryansk and Roslavl. He organized a trade union of printing-shop workers in Smolensk. In 1907, he began his journalist career as editor of the newspaper Dneprovskaya Zarya ('Dniepr Dawn'). This newspaper was subsequently banned for its political content.

== Vilna decade ==
In 1911, he was expelled from Smolensk and shifted his residence to Vilna. In Vilna, he continued to be involved in organizing trade unions. He worked at editorial offices of Severo-Zapadny Golos ('North-Western Voice'), Vechernyaya Gazeta ('Evening Newspaper'), and Veestnik Znaniya ('Herald of Knowledge'). In 1916, Ginzburg joined the United Social-Democrats (Internationalists), an organization that published and agitated against the German occupation authorities in Vilna.

He eventually emerged as the leader of the Vilna organization of the Russian Social Democratic Labour Party (Mensheviks). During the spring of 1918, Ginzburg's group took part in the united internationalist social democrat platform in Vilna (along with former members of the Lithuanian Social Democratic Party and the small communist cell). In the debates with the other social democrats, Ginzburg called for the formation of an independent Lithuanian-Belorussian democratic republic (covering all of Lithuania, all of Belorussia including the Mogilev Governorate and the Vitebsk Governorate) with its own constituent assembly. His position was sharply criticized by the other factions and he stopped attending the joint meetings. Afterwards, Ginzburg's faction regrouped as the Social Democratic Labour Party of Lithuania and Belorussia (internationalists). This party upheld a Menshevik-Internationalist line. During the summer of 1918, Ginzburg escaped to Petrograd to avoid persecution by the German military authorities. In Petrograd, he contributed to the Bolshevik newspaper Severnaya Kommuna ('Northern Commune').

As the Red Army seized Vilna in January 1919, Ginzburg returned to the city. He was named deputy head of the Education Department of the city and was elected to the Vilna Soviet of Workers Deputies. As Vilna was seized by Polish forces, he moved into underground activities. At one point in the second half of 1919, he was captured by the Polish secret police, but he managed to escape from captivity.

Girinis-Ginzburg (having adopted the name 'Girinis' the preceding year) joined the Communist Party of Lithuania and Belorussia in early 1920, along with some other members of his Menshevik-Internationalist group in Vilna. In April 1920, the Communist Party sent him to Kaunas, the provisional capital of the Republic of Lithuania. Between April and June 1920, he served as the secretary of the Central Bureau of Trade Unions of Lithuania. He was the main organizer of the first congress of the Lithuanian trade unions held in Kaunas. In July 1920, he was arrested for having organized a general strike in the city and tried by a military tribunal.

== In Soviet Russia ==
Girinis was sent to Soviet Russia with the first exchange of political prisoners between Soviet Russia and Lithuania. He settled down in Moscow. In June–July 1921, he attended the 3rd World Congress of the Communist International as a delegate of the Communist Party of Lithuania. Around the same time, at the first congress of the Red International of Labour Unions (Profintern), he was elected to the Profintern Central Council representing the Lithuanian trade unions. In July 1924, Girinis attended the fourth congress of the Communist Party of Lithuania (held in Moscow) as a delegate with consultative vote. The fourth party congress elected him to the party's Central Committee.

He wrote books seeking to popularize Marxism-Leninism to wider audiences. Girinis worked closely with the Lithuanian communist leader Vincas Mickevičius-Kapsukas. This cooperation was especially close in 1926–1927, as the two worked in the Baltic Sections of Profintern (Girinis) and Comintern (Kapsukas).

During the 1930s Girinis held various positions. He continued to lead the Baltic Section of Profintern. He was active in party work in Moscow and Tashkent. He spent some time stationed at the Soviet representative office in Prague. He worked as instructor at the political department of the Moscow–Kazan Railway. Continuing his journalistic activities, he served as the head of the editorial departments of the newspapers Pravda, Trybuna Radziecka and Vechernyaya Moskva.

== Later life ==
During the Second World War, Girinis was in charge of the Newspaper Information Bureau of the Moscow City Committee of the All-Union Communist Party (bolsheviks). In the aftermath of the war, Girinis taught at trade union and party schools, teaching history and trade union theory.

Girinis was a prolific writer, authoring various books, articles, and pamphlets. He wrote extensively on the history of labour and revolutionary movements in Lithuania in 1918–1921. Between 1951 and 1954, he collaborated with the Institute for Party History of the Central Committee of the Communist Party of Lithuania, gathering archival materials for history of labour and left-wing movements.

Girinis died in Moscow on 8 September 1961. He was survived by his daughter, Olga Sergeevna Rivkina.

== Bibliography ==
- Ленин о национализме ('Lenin on Nationalism'), 1924
- Ленин о религии ('Lenin on Religion'), 1924
- Ленин об искусстве ('Lenin on Art'), 1924
- Očerednoe izvraščenie marksizma: o "teorii" Enčmena; sbornik statej, 1924
- Ленин о сельском пролетариате ('Lenin on the Rural Proletariat'), 1925
- Für den Leninismus ('For Leninism'), 1931
