= Young Communist League of Lithuania (1989) =

Young Communist League of Lithuania (Lithuanian: Lietuvos komunistinio jaunimo sąjunga) was a political youth movement in the Lithuanian SSR, Soviet Union. It was formed at a congress in June 1989, as the Leninist Young Communist League of Lithuania (LLKJS), the Lithuanian republican branch of the All Union Leninist Young Communist League (VLKSM), broke away from VLKSM and formed an independent organization. The break came after a survey had shown that only 11% of young Lithuanians considered that the LLKJS should have remained in the VLKSM.

The new organization did not adhere to the principles of democratic centralism. The shift was however not only organizational, but also represented a break in political orientation. The formulated goal of VLKSM of 'progress towards communism' was replaced by a pledge to 'defend the sovereignty of the Lithuanian SSR'. A sector of the erstwhile Leninist Young Communist League of Lithuania decided to remain in VLKSM, and formed a new Lithuanian republican branch of VLKSM.

In defiance of an amended election system, LKJS refused to nominate delegates to the Lithuanian Supreme Soviet.

The LKJS contested the 1990 Lithuanian elections, separately from the Communist Party. The organization did not win any seats though.

Alfonsas Macaitis was the First Sectary of the youth league. Maciatis claimed that the organization was the continuation of the interbellum Young Communist League of Lithuania. According to Maciatis, the interbellum youth league had been illegally annexed to the VLKSM.

In October 1990, the youth league was transformed into the Youth Forum of Lithuania. The youth league decided to hand over all its properties to the new organization.
