= Čepaitis =

- Lithuanian surname
- m.: Čepaitis
- f.: (unmarried): Čepaitytė
- f.: (married): Čepaitienė

Čepaitis is a Lithuanian surname, a patronymic from the name Čepas.

- Gražutė Čepaitė-Ragauskienė
- Virgilijus Čepaitis
- Zita Čepaitė, Lithuanian philologist, journalist, writer
