= Social Democratic Party of Lithuania and Belorussia =

The Social Democratic Party of Lithuania and Belorussia (Lithuanian: Lietuvos ir Baltarusijos socialdemokratų partija) was a political party that existed in Vilna in March–July 1918.

The party emerged from a split in the Lithuanian Social Democratic Party (LSDP). On 22 March 1918, at a conference of the Vilna section of LSDP, revolutionary-minded party members voted to break links with their mother party in protest against LSDP leaders Steponas Kairys and Mykolas Biržiška who were members of the Council of Lithuania and who were viewed as collaborators with the German occupation.

There was an agreement to form a united internationalist organization, and the party was joined the small communist 'initiative group' (formed around Aleksandra Drabavičiūtė, who had arrived in April 1918 of a first emissary of the Central Bureau of the Lithuanian Sections of the Russian Communist Party (Bolsheviks) to Lithuania) and the Vilna section of the Russian Social Democratic Labour Party (Mensheviks) (led by Ginsburg-Girinis). The General Jewish Labour Bund opted not to join the party, as their proposal for a federal party structure had been rejected. Likewise the intelligentsia around the LSDP stayed away from the party.

Between the former LSDP members, the communist group and the Mensheviks debates ranged on party programme and national question, with Menshevik and Bolshevik viewpoints clashing. The Social Democratic Party of Lithuania and Belorussia called for a Lithuanian-Belorussian democratic state with its own constituent assembly, a position not acceptable to the Bolsheviks. Drabavičiūtė proposed that the party adopt the name 'Communist Party', who this proposition was rejected by the other factions.

In July 1918, the debates broke down and the revolutionary social democrats and individual communists formed the Social Democratic Labour Party of Lithuania and Belorussia (which later became the Communist Party) at a meeting in Vilna. The Menshevik organization of Ginsburg-Girinis, on the other hand, would mutuate into the Social Democratic Labour Party of Lithuania and Belorussia (internationalists).
