= Avilys =

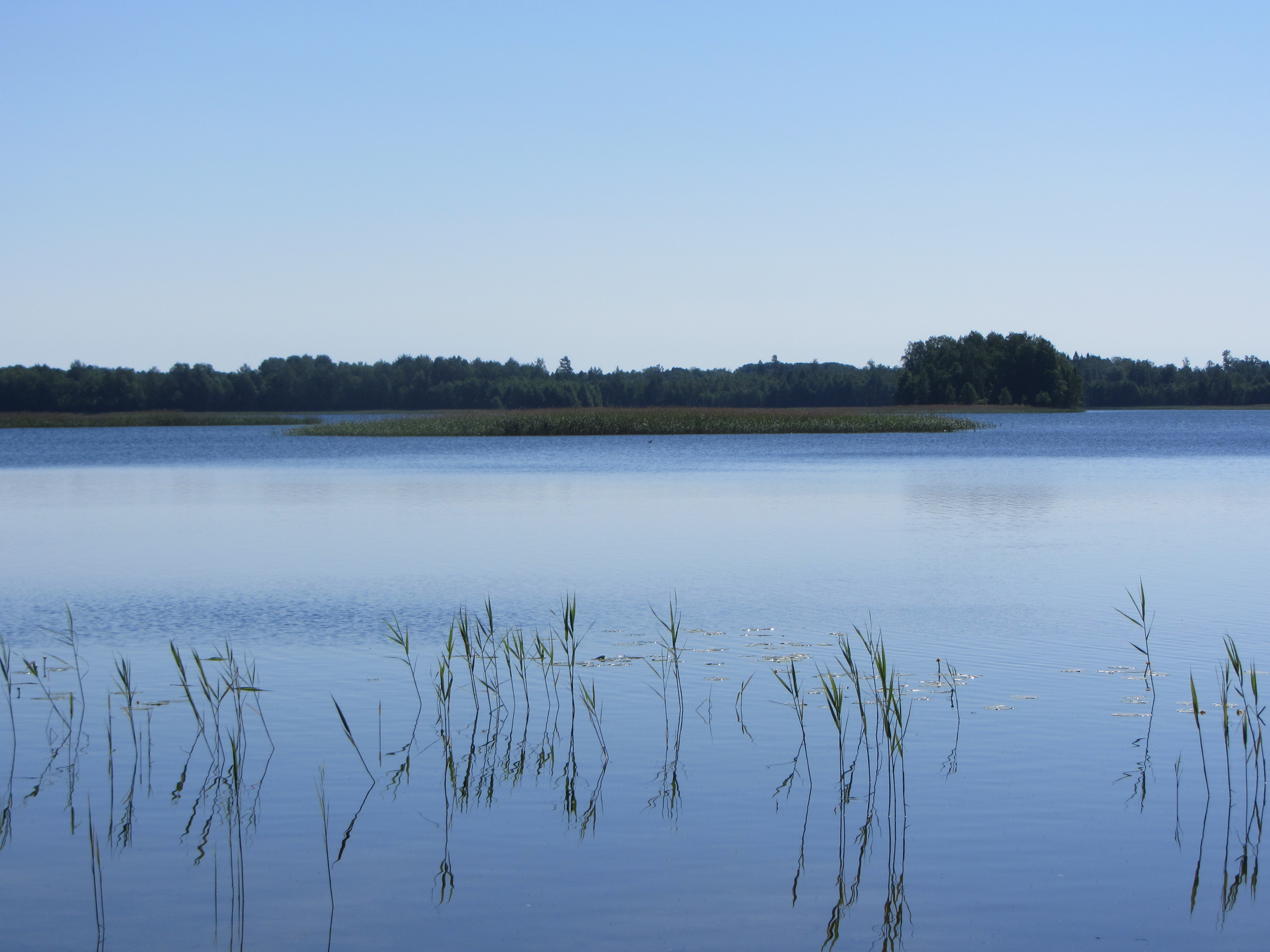
- Avilys Lake

- Location within Lithuania
- Location: Zarasai District Municipality, Lithuania
- Coordinates: 55°45′N 26°05′E
- Type: Lake
- Catchment area: 73.7 km^{2} (28.5 sq mi)
- Basin countries: Lithuania
- Surface area: 1,226.68 ha (3,031.2 acres)
- Average depth: 2.9 m (9 ft 6 in)
- Max. depth: 13.5 m (44 ft)
- Shore length^{1}: 54.82 kilometres (34.06 mi)
- Surface elevation: 157 m (515 ft)
- ^{1} Shore length is not a well-defined measure.

Avilys is a lake located near Napreliai in Zarasai district municipality in Utena county of Lithuania. It is part of the Western Dvina river basin, which flows across the border in Latvia.

== Geography ==
Avilys lake located near Napreliai village in Zarasai district municipality in Utena county of Lithuania. It is one of the 296 lakes in the district. Spread over an area of 1,226.68 ha (3,031.2 acres), it is located in northeast Lithuania, close to the border with Latvia. The average depth is around 3 meters (9.8 ft) while the maximum depth is around 13.5 meters (44 ft). It has about 44 km (27 mi) of shoreline.

It is part of the Western Dvina (Daugava) river basin, which flows across the border in Latvia. The lake forms part of the watercourse of the Laucesa river, which runs across the Latian-Lithuanian border. The lake is one of the few outside the protected areas in the district. It has been declared as a water body of national importance by the government of Lithuania. The lake has 31 islands and consists of the largest number of lake islands in the region.

== Composition ==
As per a 2017 measurement, the lake water was measured to have a pH of 8.6, slightly more than the average pH from other lakes in the region. The dissolved oxygen was measured at 8.8 mg/l, amongst the lowest in the region. The total dissolved content was recorded to be 1.7 mg/l of which total nitrogen was 0.54 mg/l.

== Flora and fauna ==
The lake consists of variety of plants and fishes. Common fishes include perch, roach, pike, tench, and bleak. Both commercial and recreational fishing is carried out in the lake. Najas flexilis is a rare aquatic plant species found only in few lakes in the region including Avilys.
