= Laucesa =

River in Latvia and Lithuania

Coordinates: 55°51′59″N 26°30′15″E

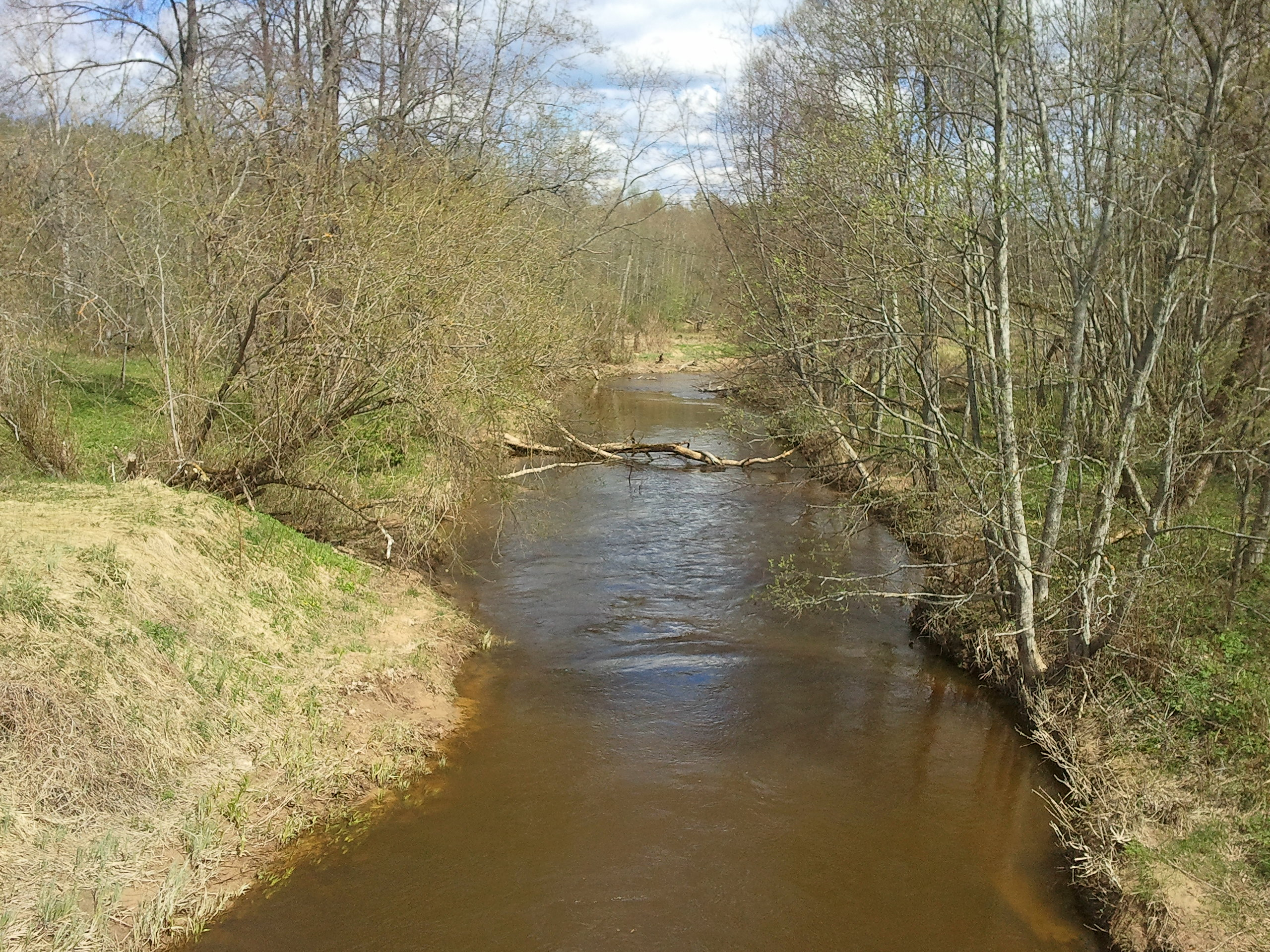
Laucesa in Latvia

Laucesa (Lithuanian: Laukesa, Polish: Łaukiesa, German: Lautze) is a 31-kilometre (19 mi) long river in Lithuania and Latvia.

It originates near Smėlynė from the Laukesas lake situated on the Latvia–Lithuania border. It first flows east along the state border for about 2 kilometres (1.2 mi). It then turns northeast and flows into the Daugava river near Daugavpils.
