= Saulius Pečeliūnas =

Lithuanian politician (1956–2023)

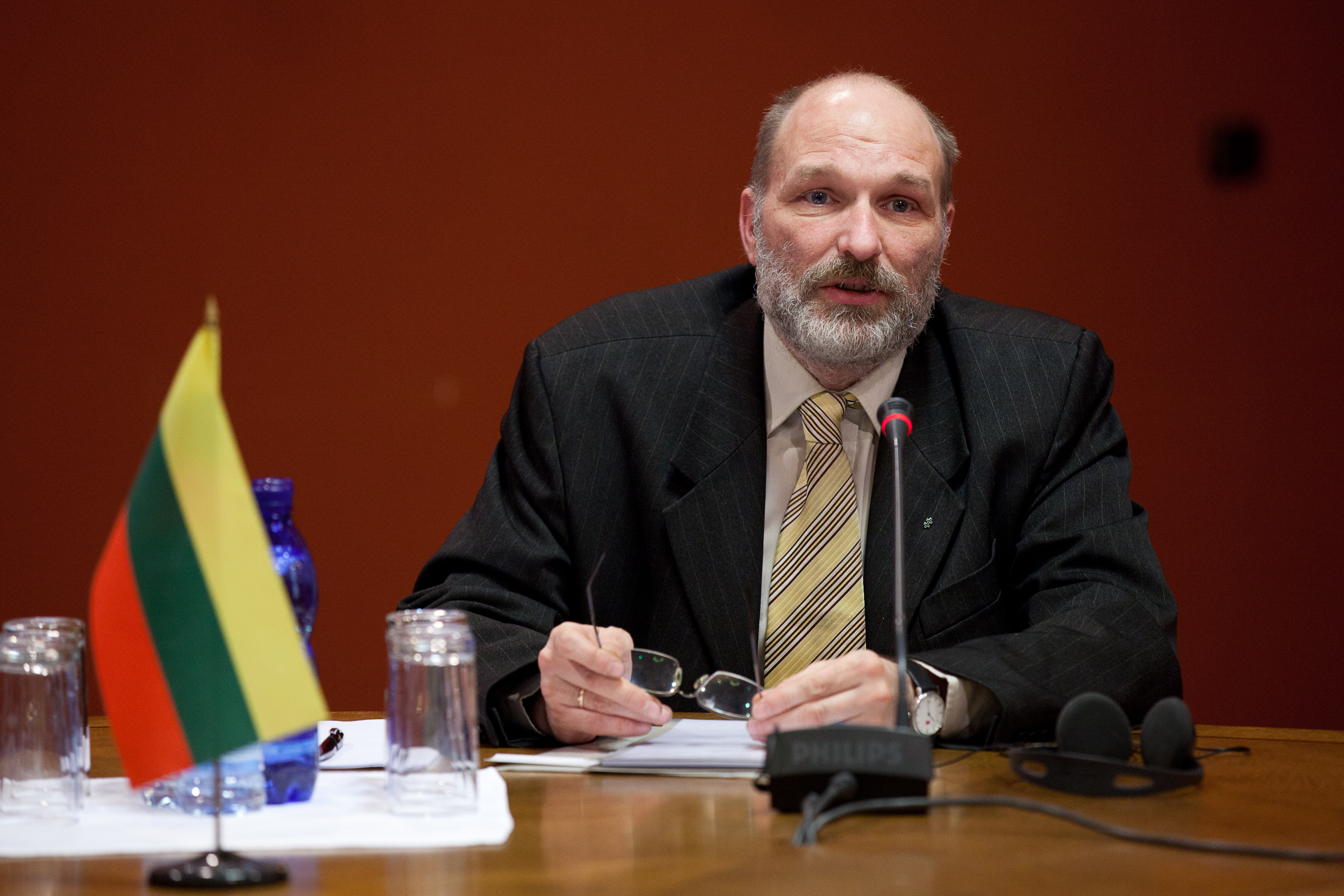
Pečeliūnas in 2011

Saulius Pečeliūnas (19 January 1956 – 2 December 2023) was a Lithuanian politician. In 1990 he was among those who signed the Act of the Re-Establishment of the State of Lithuania. Pečeliūnas died on 2 December 2023, at the age of 67.

== Sources ==
- Biography
