= Mykolas Burokevičius =

Lithuanian communist politician (1927–2016)

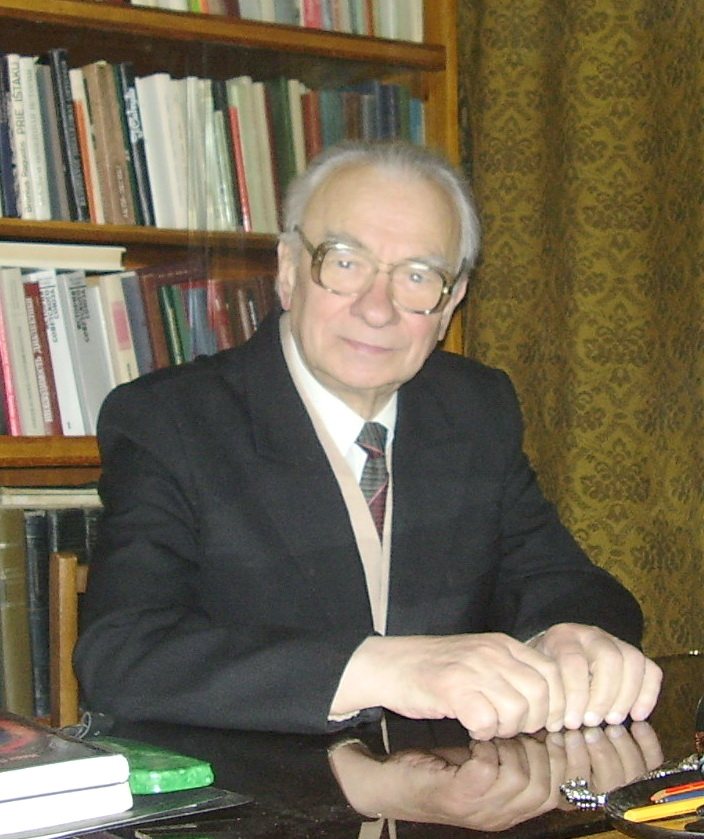
- Burokevičius in 2006

First Secretary of Central Committee of the Communist Party of Lithuania
- In office 3 March 1990 – 23 August 1991
- Preceded by: Algirdas Brazauskas
- Succeeded by: Position abolished

Full member of the 28th Politburo
- In office 14 July 1990 – 29 August 1991

Personal details
- Born: 7 October 1927 Alytus, Lithuania
- Died: 20 January 2016 (aged 88) Vilnius, Lithuania
- Party: Communist Party of Lithuania
- Other political affiliations: Communist Party of the Soviet Union
- Education: Vilnius Pedagogical Institute

Mykolas Burokevičius (7 October 1927 – 20 January 2016) was a communist political leader in Lithuania. After the Communist Party of Lithuania separated from the Communist Party of the Soviet Union (CPSU), he established alternative pro-CPSU Communist Party of Lithuania in early 1990, and led it as the First Secretary of Central Committee until its ban in 1991. He was the only Lithuanian to serve in the Politburo of the CPSU Central Committee, and did so from 1990 until its ban in 1991.

== Biography ==
He was born in Alytus, Lithuania in 1927. In 1942, a young Burokevičius was employed as a carpenter and a machinist at a plant in Udmurtia. In 1944 he became a member of the Lithuanian Communist Party where he worked as a chief of department and instructor. He graduated from the Vilnius Pedagogical Institute (now the Vytautas Magnus University Education Academy) in 1955 and the Lithuanian Academy of Sciences in 1963.

In 1963 he became a research fellow at the Institute of the History of the Party of the Central Committee of the Lithuanian Communist Party.

== Political activities ==
After the Communist Party of Lithuania voted to separate from the Communist Party of the Soviet Union in December 1989, he became the Secretary of the latter and on 3 March 1990 he gained the title of the First Secretary of the former.

His party's political programme stated that one of its goals was to maintain Lithuania as part of the USSR. Seven members of Burokevičius' party were elected during the Supreme Council of Lithuania elections on 24 February 1990. The Supreme Council declared re-establishment of Lithuania's independence during its first session in March.

On 11 January 1991 the pro-CPSU CPL sent an ultimatum to the Government of Lithuania, ordering it to comply with USSR President Mikhail Gorbachev's public requirement that the Supreme Council would immediately reinstate the legal force of the USSR and Lithuanian SSR Constitutions. The requirement was voiced one day earlier. The party added that failing that it might create the "Lithuanian National Salvation Committee" (Lithuanian: Lietuvos nacionalinio gelbėjimo komitetas), "which would take care of the matters of the future of the LSSR" - and eventually did so. During its lifetime, the party established several organizations meant to be alternative ministries.

The Soviet Army assault on the Vilnius TV tower and station on 13 January 1991 followed, during which 14 people were killed. During the period of 11 to 19 January 1991, the pro-CPSU party also made five more public declarations urging the forceful overthrow of the Government and other authorities of independent Lithuania. Burokevičius took part preparing those declarations.

== Prosecution ==
Burokevičius was indicted by Lithuanian prosecutors as a suspect in a criminal with regard to the January Events case on 22 August 1991. He was eventually arrested on 15 January 1994 in Belarus (on Lithuanian orders). From October 1996 to August 1999, Burokevičius and five other members of the Lithuanian Communist Party were tried for their involvement in the January Events. In August 1999, he was sentenced in Vilnius to 12 years' imprisonment for organizing murders and grievous bodily harm and also for establishing organizations which intended to overthrow the state. In early 2000, President Valdas Adamkus proposed the chief of colony to prepare documents that granted Burokevičius eligibility for pardon. Burokevičius refused this request, pleading innocent and stating that he was not guilty in his actions. He completed his sentence and was released on 13 January 2006.

On 5 January 2006 the European Court of Human Rights declared admissible Burokevičius' case against Lithuania on three counts of possible Convention for the Protection of Human Rights and Fundamental Freedoms violations and joined it with two other cases against Lithuania for its January Events lawsuits (Juozas Kuolelis and Leonas Bartoševičius). Burokevičius also sought compensation.

Specifically, the court examined whether Lithuania violated these articles of the convention:

- Article 6 (right to fair trial) – that he spent more than a "reasonable time" awaiting court proceedings
- Article 7 (no punishment without law) – that he was convicted for actions which were not crimes at the time under Lithuanian law (Burokevičius claimed that as the Lithuanian state came into existence only after the Soviet coup attempt of 1991, it cannot apply its criminal law to earlier events)
- Articles 9 (freedom of conscience), 10 (freedom of expression), 11 (freedom of association) and 14 (prohibition of discrimination) – Burokevičius and others claimed that they had been unjustly punished in the exercise of their beliefs as communists, their legitimate work as journalists, their right of association with other individuals, and their support for the idea of Lithuania's continuing membership of the USSR during the politically turbulent times of 1990–1991.

On 19 February 2008, the Court delivered judgment deciding that no violations took place.

== Later life ==
He died in Vilnius, Lithuania in 2016, aged 88.
