= Undzer emes =

Yiddish publication in Lithuania (1923–1934)

- Type: Monthly newspaper
- Founded: 1923
- Ceased publication: 1934
- Political alignment: Communist
- Language: Yiddish
- Headquarters: Kaunas; Berlin (1931–1933)
- Country: Interwar Lithuania; Germany (1931–1933)
- Circulation: 3000

Undzer emes ('Our Truth') was a Yiddish-language communist publication in interwar Lithuania, an organ of the Central Committee of the Communist Party of Lithuania. The publication was issued illegally and irregularly from Kaunas between 1923 and 1934. It was published clandestinely on a monthly basis, with a circulation of 3,000. Aizikas Lifšicas and J. Šochotas were part of the editorial team of Undzer emes.

Undzer emes was printed in Berlin 1931–1933, but the Lithuanian communists could not continue publishing activities there following the National Socialist takeover in Germany.
