= Zigmas Vaišvila =

Lithuanian politician

Zigmas Vaišvila (born 20 December 1956 in Šiauliai) is a Lithuanian politician. In 1990 he was among those who signed the Act of the Re-Establishment of the State of Lithuania. He and his wife, Regina, were married in 1979.
