= Virgilijus Čepaitis =

Lithuanian publisher and translator

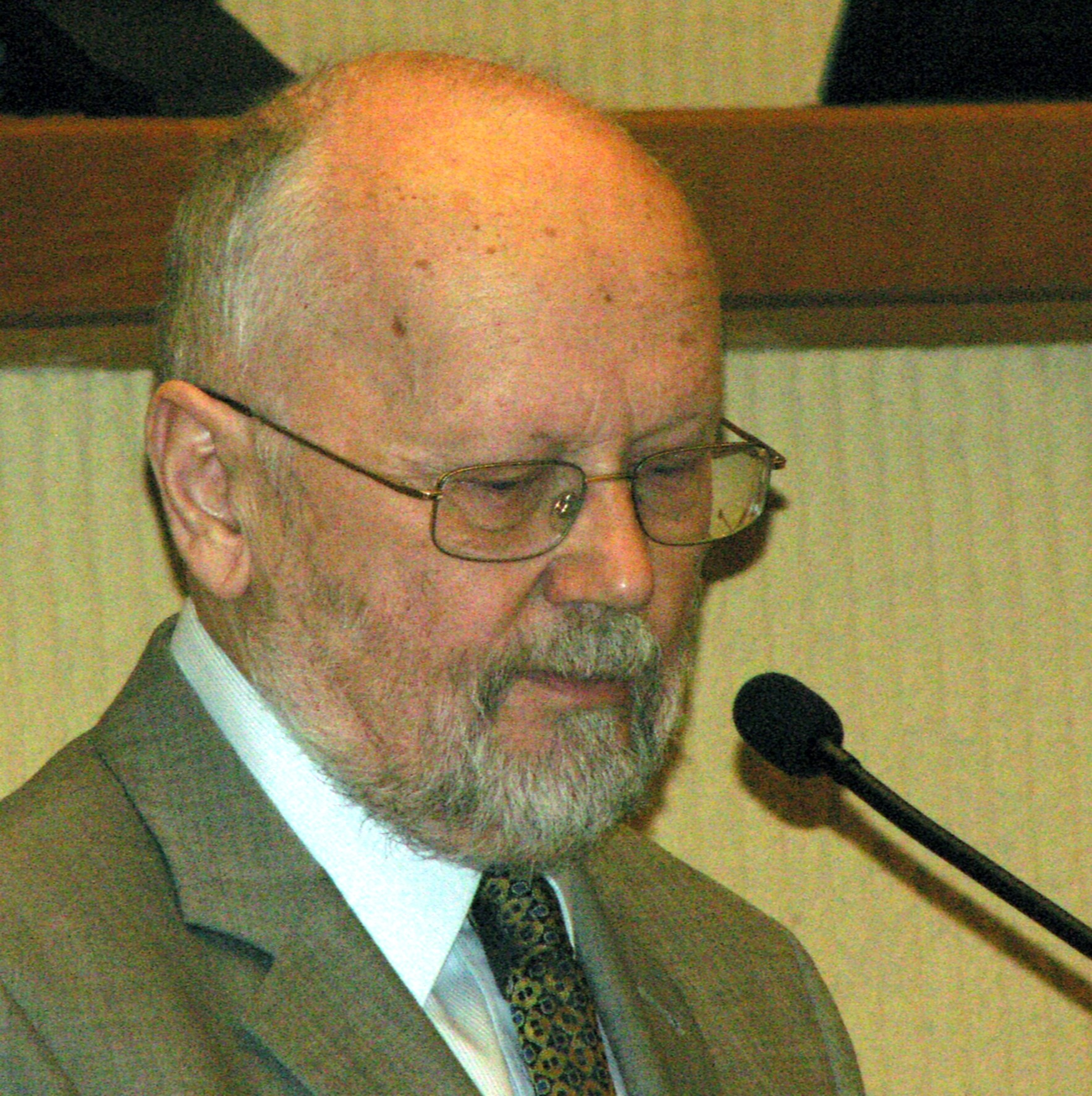
Virgilijus Čepaitis

Virgilijus Juozas Čepaitis (8 November 1937 in Šakiai, Lithuania) is a Lithuanian publisher and translator, best known for his involvement in the Sąjūdis independence movement. He was the Executive Secretary of Sąjūdis and a member of its Initiative Group. He was also a signatory of the Declaration of the Restoration of Independence of Lithuania on 11 March 1990.

In 1961, Čepaitis graduated from Moscow's Maxim Gorky Literature Institute. Čepaitis is married to Auksuolė Čepaitienė. They have three children and live in Vilnius, Lithuania.

== Positions held ==
- 1958–1988 – free-lance translator;
- 1988–1989 – the chief-editor of the film company "ARS";
- 1989–1990 – the executive secretary of the Sąjūdis Movement;
- 1990–1992 – Member of Parliament and Chairman of the Committee for Civil Rights and Ethnic Minorities;
- Chairman of the Sąjūdis faction, the member of the Lithuanian delegation in the negotiations with Russia in 1990–1991. Head of the Lithuanian delegation in the non-official negotiations with the Soviet Union in Hague, organised by De Burght consultations, 1991;
- 1993–1996 – the chief-editor of the publishing company "Litera";
- 1996–2001 – the director of the publishing company "Tvermė".
- Since 2001 – the owner of the publishing company "Librum"

== Social and political positions ==
- Since 1968 – member of the Lithuanian Writers' Union;
- 1988 – member of the Initiative Group of the Lithuanian Reform Movement (Sąjūdis);
- 1988–1990 – member of the Sąjūdis' Seimas Council;
- 1989–1994 – Chairman of the Lithuania-Poland Association;
- 1990–1992 – Chairman of the Independence Party;
- 1990–1992 – Chairman of Stasys Šalkauskis Cultural Foundation;
- Since 2003 – member of Lithuanian Translators Union.
- Since 1993 – member of the Association of Signatories of the Independence Act

== Literary works ==
Čepaitis has translated 59 books, namely translations from English to Lithuanian (including stories and plays of A. A. Milne, J. O'Neal, William Saroyan, James Thurber, Tennessee Williams); books from Lithuanian to Russian (novels and stories of Lithuanian writers Juozas Aputis, Jonas Avyžius, Juozas Baltušis, Vytautas Bubnys, Romualdas Granauskas, Romualdas Lankauskas, Jonas Mikelinskas, Kazys Saja, Ieva Simonaitytė, Vytautas Sirijos Gira, etc.); books from Polish to Russian (stories and plays of T. Karpowicz, S. Lem, S. Mrozek, etc.).

He is the author of a screenplay for the film Virto ąžuolai (Oak Trees Fell; 1976).

== Awards ==
- The Medal of Lithuanian Independence (awarded on July 1, 2000)
- The Award of Commemoration of Lithuania's Membership of NATO (awarded on July 25, 2002)
