= Menshevik-Internationalists =

Left-wing faction of the Russian Social Democratic Labour Party (Mensheviks)

The Menshevik-Internationalists were a faction inside the Russian Social Democratic Labour Party (Mensheviks). The faction, representing the left-wing inside the party, emerged in May 1917. It was joined by a number of political leaders returning from exile, the most notable being Julius Martov. The Menshevik-Internationalists opposed the pro-war line of Dan and Tsereteli. The Menshevik-Internationalists hoped to sway the Menshevik Party over to an anti-war stance. The Menshevik-Internationalists dominated the Menshevik Party Organizations in Kharkov, Tula and some other places. They had some control over the Petrograd branch of the party.

At the Menshevik Party congress in August 1917, the Menshevik-Internationalists represented about a third of the gathered delegates. A major chunk of the Menshevik-Internationalist faction broke away and joined the Bolsheviks in August 1917. This group included Yuri Larin.

At the election for the All-Russian Central Executive Committee held at the Third Congress of Soviets in January 1918, the Menshevik-Internationalists obtained two out of 306 seats.

== See also ==
- Social Democratic Labour Party of Lithuania and Belorussia (internationalists)
