= Vladimiras Beriozovas =

Lithuanian politician

Vladimiras Beriozovas (29 September 1929 – 16 March 2016) was a Lithuanian politician. In 1990 he was among those who signed the Act of the Re-Establishment of the State of Lithuania.
