= Communist Party of Lithuania =

Banned political party in Lithuania

Communist Party of Lithuania Lietuvos komunistų partija
- First Secretary: Antanas Sniečkus (first); Mykolas Burokevičius (last)
- Founded: 1 October 1918
- Banned: 1918–1940 (first ban); 23 August 1991–present (second ban)
- Succeeded by: Democratic Labour Party of Lithuania; Socialist People's Front (not legal successors)
- Headquarters: Vilnius
- Newspaper: Tiesa
- Youth wing: Leninist Young Communist League of Lithuania
- Ideology: Communism; Marxism–Leninism; Left-conservatism; Soviet patriotism
- Political position: Far-left
- National affiliation: Communist Party of the Soviet Union (1940–1989)
- International affiliation: Communist International (1919–1943)
- Continental affiliation: UCP–CPSU
- Colours: Red
- Supreme Council – Reconstituent Seimas (1990): 7 / 141 (5%)

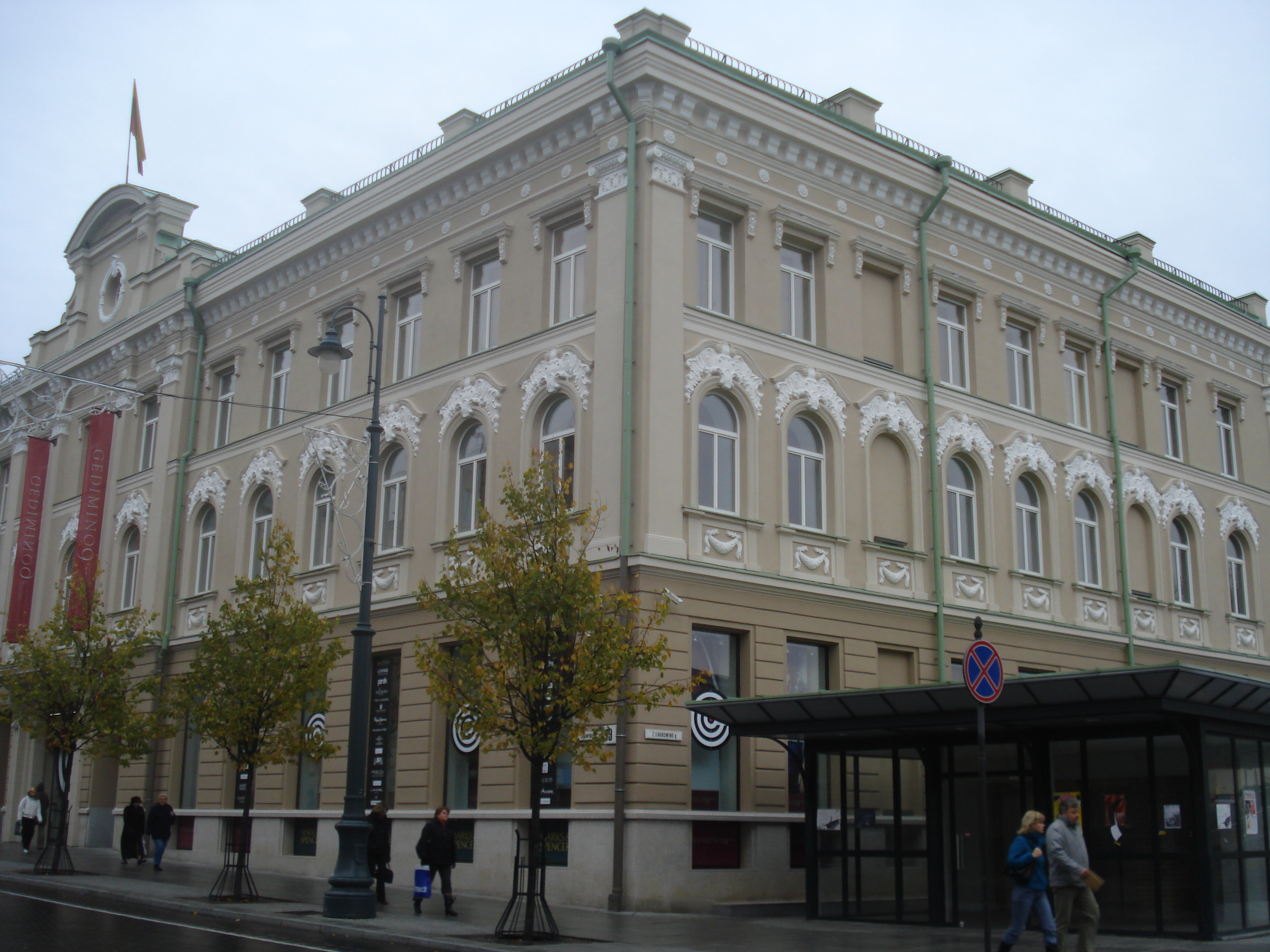
Former Central Committee office of the Lithuanian Communist Party

The Communist Party of Lithuania (Lithuanian: Lietuvos komunistų partija; Russian: Коммунистическая партия Литвы, romanized: Kommunisticheskaya partiya Litvy) is a banned Marxist-Leninist party in Lithuania. The party was established in early October 1918 and operated clandestinely until it was legalized in 1940 after the Soviets claimed the Baltics. The party was banned in August 1991, following the coup attempt in Moscow which later led to the dissolution of the Soviet Union and the end of the Lithuanian SSR. It remains illegal in modern day Lithuania and continues to operate, albeit having a negligible presence in Lithuanian politics.

== History ==
The party was working illegally from 1920 until 1940. Although the party was illegal, some of its members took part in the 1922 Lithuanian parliamentary election under title "Workers Groups". It managed to gather 5.0 per cent of vote (or around 40,000 votes) and elect five members. Due to political instability, Seimas was dissolved and new elections took place in 1923. In these elections, the party lost half of its support.

In 1940 the party amalgamated with the Communist Party of the Soviet Union (Bolsheviks) (CPSU). By the time of the formation of the Lithuanian SSR, the Communist Party of Lithuania (LKP) was headed by Antanas Sniečkus. In 1940, the LKP merged into the CPSU(b). The territorial organisation of the party in Lithuania was called Communist Party of Lithuania (Bolshevik) (LKP (b)). In the Lithuanian territorial organisation, the first secretary of the Central Committee of the party (always a Lithuanian) was de facto ruler of the country. The second secretary for the most of Soviet era was a Moscow-appointed Russian. In 1952 the name of the old Lithuanian party, LKP, was re-adopted.

On 24 December 1989, during mass protests of the Singing Revolution against the Soviet Union in Lithuania, the party declared itself independent from the Communist Party of the Soviet Union. By 1990, the main body of the CPL reorganized itself as the Democratic Labour Party of Lithuania, which in turn by 2001 merged with Social Democratic Party of Lithuania under the latter's name; but with leadership dominated by ex-communists and 'progressive' socialists.

A small portion of the party remained loyal to the CPSU, and reorganized as the Communist Party of Lithuania ('on platform of Communist Party of the Soviet Union') under the leadership of Mykolas Burokevičius after the "traditional" party declared independence from its Soviet Union counterpart. The party played a major role in the January 1991 Events in Lithuania.

The Communist Party of Lithuania was eventually banned on 23 August 1991.

== Membership ==
Party membership^{[1]}
Year	Members
1930	650
1936	1,942
1940	1,741
1941	4,620
1945	3,540
1950	27,800
1955	35,500
1960	54,300
1965	86,400
1970	116,600
1975	140,200
1980	165,800

== Governance ==
=== First Secretaries ===
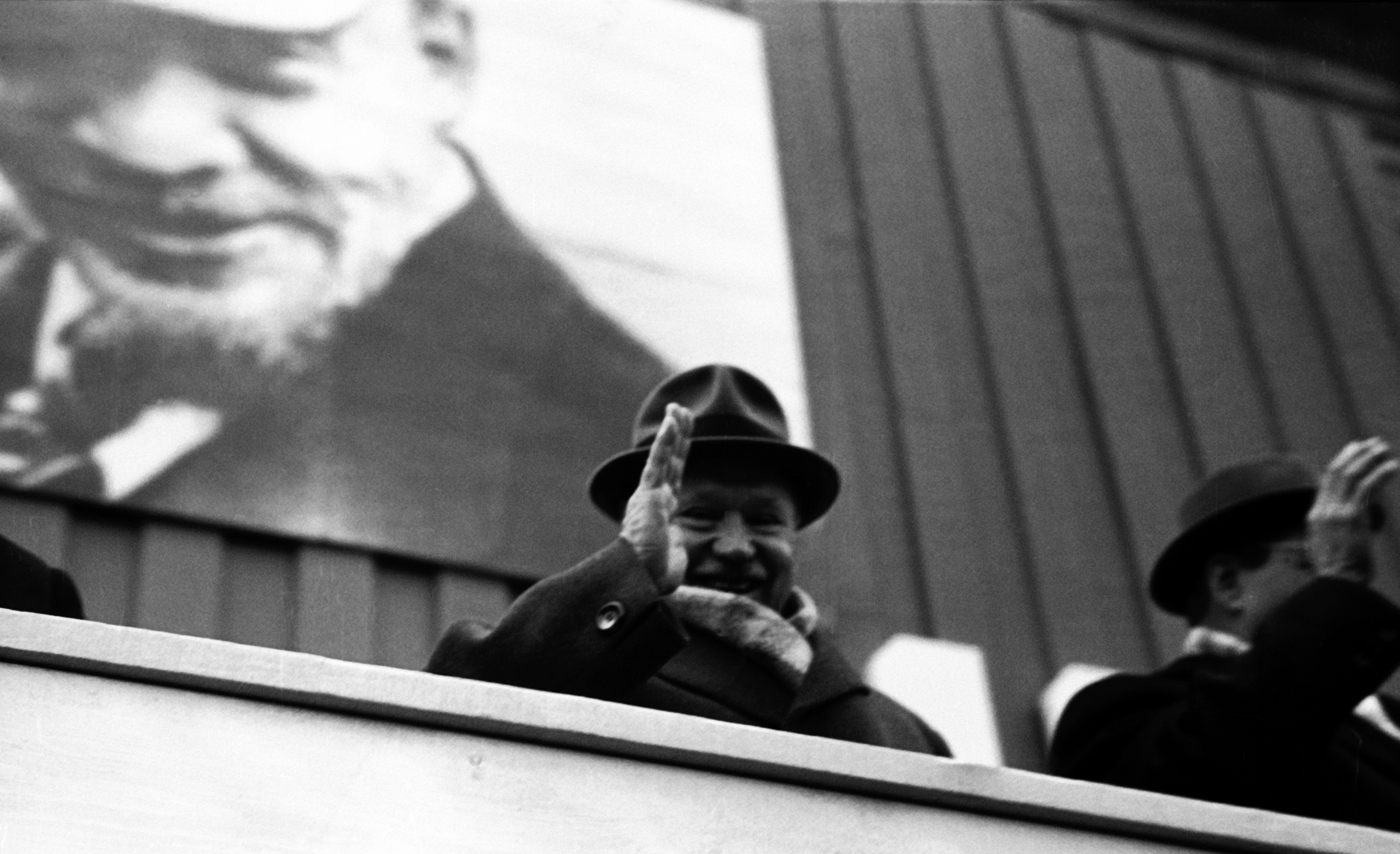
Antanas Sniečkus, the leader of the Communist Party of Lithuania from 1940 to 1974.

No.	Picture	Name (Birth–Death)	Took office	Left office	Political party
First Secretary
1		Antanas Sniečkus (1903–1974)	21 July 1940	22 January 1974	CPL/CPSU
—		Valery Khazarov acting (1918–2013)	22 January 1974	18 February 1974	CPL/CPSU
2		Petras Griškevičius (1924–1987)	18 February 1974	14 November 1987	CPL/CPSU
—		Nikolai Mitkin acting (1929–1998)	14 November 1987	1 December 1987	CPL/CPSU
3		Ringaudas Songaila (1929–2019)	1 December 1987	19 October 1988	CPL/CPSU
4		Algirdas Brazauskas (1932–2010)	19 October 1988	23 December 1989	CPL/CPSU
4		Algirdas Brazauskas (1932–2010)	23 December 1989	8 December 1990	CPL (independent)
"Leading role" of the party abolished 7 December 1989
First Secretary (of pro-Moscow breakaway faction)
5		Mykolas Burokevičius (1927–2016)	23 December 1989	23 August 1991	CPL/CPSU

=== Second Secretaries ===
- Icikas Meskupas-Adomas (9 February 1941 – 13 March 1942)
- Vladas Niunka (April – 30 December 1944)
- Alexander Isachenko (30 December 1944 – 24 November 1946)
- Alexander Trofimov (24 November 1946 – 22 September 1952)
- Vasily Aronov (25 September 1952 – 11 June 1953)
- Motiejus Šumauskas (February 1954 – 24 January 1956)
- Boris Sharkov (28 January 1956 – 27 September 1961)
- Boris Popov (30 September 1961 – 13 April 1967)
- Valery Khazarov (13 April 1967 – 10 December 1978)
- Nikolay Dubenko (11 December 1978 – 17 September 1986)
- Nikolai Mitkin (17 September 1986 – 9 December 1988)
- Vladimir Beryozov (9 December 1988 – 1990)

=== Congresses ===
Congress	Date	Delegates Voting + advisory	Notes
1st	1–3 October 1918	34	Took place illegally in Vilnius
2nd	4–6 March 1919	159 + 10	Joint congress with the Communist Party of Byelorussia; Established the Communist Party (Bolsheviks) of Lithuania and Belorussia
3rd	24–29 October 1921	12	Took place illegally in Königsberg
4th	17–21 July 1924	11 + 4	Took place in Moscow; after the 5th World Congress of the Comintern
5th	5–9 February 1941	294 + 66	Took place in Kaunas; First congress after establishment of the Lithuanian SSR
6th	15–18 February 1949	471 + 74	First congress after World War II
7th	22–25 September 1952	517 + 75	Elected 9 delegates to the 19th Congress of the Communist Party of the Soviet Union
8th	16–19 February 1954	541 + 44	
9th	24–27 January 1956	578 + 101	Elected 9 delegates to the 20th Congress of the Communist Party of the Soviet Union
10th	12–15 February 1958	572 + 108	
11th	14–16 January 1959	596 + 126	Elected 9 delegates to the 21st Congress of the Communist Party of the Soviet Union
12th	1–3 March 1960	593 + 103	
13th	27–29 April 1961	688 + 119	Elected 36 delegates to the 22nd Congress of the Communist Party of the Soviet Union
14th	9–10 January 1964	765 + 99	
15th	3–5 March 1966	789 + 90	Elected 42 delegates to the 23rd Congress of the Communist Party of the Soviet Union
16th	3–5 March 1971	748 + 47	Elected 45 delegates to the 24th Congress of the Communist Party of the Soviet Union
17th	20–22 January 1976	904	Elected 49 delegates to the 25th Congress of the Communist Party of the Soviet Union
18th	29–30 January 1981	933	Elected 42 delegates to the 26th Congress of the Communist Party of the Soviet Union
19th	24–25 January 1986	947	Elected 55 delegates to the 27th Congress of the Communist Party of the Soviet Union
20th	19 December 1989	1033	Voted to separate from the Communist Party of the Soviet Union

== See also ==
- Communist Party (Bolsheviks) of Lithuania and Belorussia
