= Boleslovas Baranauskas =

Soviet politician (1902–1975)

Chairman of the Supreme Soviet of the Lithuanian Soviet Socialist Republic
- In office 25 August 1940 – 1951
- Preceded by: Office established
- Succeeded by: Feliksas Bieliauskas

Personal details
- Born: 5 October 1902 Vaivadiškiai, Ukmergė County, Kovno Governorate, Russian Empire
- Died: 2 December 1975 (aged 73) Vilnius, Lithuanian Soviet Socialist Republic, Soviet Union
- Party: Communist Party of Lithuania
- Profession: Politician; intelligence officer

Boleslovas Baranauskas (Russian: Боле́словас Барана́ускас; 5 October 1902 – 2 December 1975) was a Soviet politician and intelligence officer. He served as Chairman of the Supreme Soviet of the Lithuanian Soviet Socialist Republic from 1940 to 1951. He was also an investigator for the NKVD.

== Biography ==
=== Early life and interwar Lithuania ===
Baranauskas was born on 5 October 1902 in Vaivadiškiai, Ukmergė County, Kovno Governorate, Russian Empire. He was educated in the Latvian cities of Jelgava and Riga before returning to Lithuania in 1919, living in Joniškis. In 1921, he joined the Communist Party of Lithuania, which was banned at the time. He was active in the communist party, leading to him being arrested and imprisoned several times. From 1923 until January 1925, he was held in the Šiauliai and Kaunas prisons.

After being released, Baranauskas joined the Communist Party's Šiauliai District Committee, leading to another arrest in 1927. He was held at the Šiauliai prison and later transferred to the Varniai concentration camp, receiving a six-year prison sentence in 1929. He was released in 1935 and then served in the communist underground, becoming a member of the Central Committee of the Communist Party in 1936 and working as an instructor in the Alytus district. Baranauskas held the position of head of the transport department of the Central Committee in 1937, then served as secretary of the communist party of Kaunas city and the district from 1937 to 1938. He later became secretary of the city party committee of Šiauliai. He was arrested again in 1939 and received a long prison sentence, being held at the forced labour camps in Dimitravas and Pabradė until June 1940.

=== World War II ===
Baranaukas was freed at the start of the Soviet occupation of Lithuania in 1940. After the Soviets occupied Lithuania, they held rigged elections to the People's Seimas (parliament), and Baranauskas won a seat; the parliament later that year became the Supreme Soviet of the Lithuanian Soviet Socialist Republic. On 25 August 1940, after the reorganization of the parliament, Baranauskas was elected Chairman of the Supreme Soviet. That same year, he became the chief of security of the Šiauliai district, the deputy commissar of the NKVD (secret police) in the Lithuanian SSR and the People's Commissariat of State Security, which the Visuotinė lietuvių enciklopedija (Universal Lithuanian Encyclopedia) described as "one of the organizers of the repressions of the Lithuanian population". He fled for the Soviet Union in June 1941, at the start of the German occupation of Lithuania during World War II.

In Russia, Baranauskas attended the Higher School of the NKVD in Moscow. Afterwards, he worked as an investigator for the secret police and served from 1942 to 1944 as head of the intelligence and information department of the headquarters of the Lithuanian partisan movement which coordinated Soviet partisan activities in Lithuania.

=== Post-war Lithuanian SSR ===
After the Soviets reoccupied the Baltic states in 1944, Baranauskas returned and continued serving as Chairman of the Supreme Soviet, a post he held until 1951; he also added the role of chairman of the Republic Council of Trade Unions of the Lithuanian SSR in 1945, which he held through 1958. Baranauskas became a member of the Central Committee of the Communist Party of Lithuania in 1949 and served in that role through 1961. He was also a member of the Supreme Soviet of the Soviet Union from 1950 to 1958.

In 1958, Baranauskas was appointed to serve at the Academy of Sciences of the Lithuanian SSR as editor-in-chief for the publication of archival documents. He held the title until his death in 1975. In this role, he oversaw the writing of documents describing the history of Lithuania, including a number of books about the country under Nazi occupation. Baranauskas wrote a memoir, titled Nineteen Years Underground (Девятнадцать лет в подполье). He died on 2 December 1975, at the age of 73, in Vilnius.
