= Karolis Didžiulis =

Lithuanian communist politician

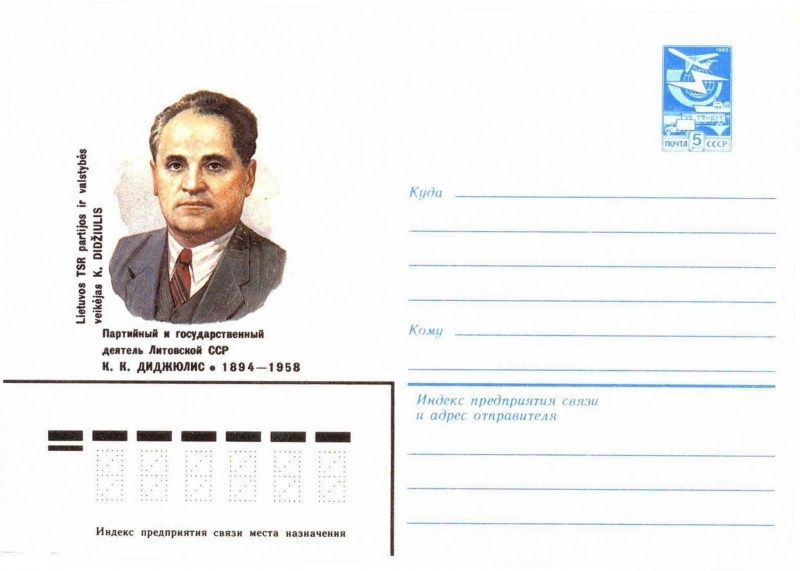
- Commemorative Soviet stamped envelope with an image of Karolis Didžiulis
- Born: Karolis Grosmanas; 19 August 1894; Mandeikiai, Russian Empire
- Died: 24 May 1958 (aged 63); Vilnius, Lithuanian SSR
- Burial place: Antakalnis Cemetery
- Education: Communist University of the National Minorities of the West
- Occupations: Communist activist, judge
- Political party: Communist Party of Lithuania
- Awards: Orders of Lenin; Order of the Red Banner of Labour

Karolis Didžiulis (born Grosmanas; 19 August 1894 – 24 May 1958) was a Lithuanian communist politician and statesman. He was a member of the Central Committee of the Communist Party of Lithuania in 1927–1958 and chairman of the Supreme Court of the Lithuanian SSR in 1947–1958.

Didžiulis completed just three years of primary education and worked as a farm worker, dockworker and metalworker in Riga before joining the Communist Party of Lithuania in 1919. The party was illegal in interwar Lithuania and Didžiulis was arrested and imprisoned numerous times, spending a total of about nine years in Lithuanian prisons. After the Soviet occupation of Lithuania in June 1940, he joined the People's Government of Lithuania, was elected to the People's Seimas, and was deputy chairman of the Supreme Soviet of the Lithuanian SSR. He was in charge of the Soviet land reform which nationalized landholdings and distributed them to landless peasants.

During World War II, he evacuated to Russia and was party representative and organizer in Penza and Pereslavl-Zalessky. He returned to Vilnius in July 1944 and participated in the Sovietization efforts of Lithuania: land nationalization, mass deportations to Siberia, and suppression of the Lithuanian partisans. From 1947 to his death in 1958, he was chairman of the Supreme Court of the Lithuanian SSR.

== Biography ==
=== Early life ===
Didžiulis was born on 19 August 1894 in Mandeikiai north of Šiauliai. He was of Latvian origin; from about 1940 he used the Lithuanian translation (Didžiulis) of his surname Grosman (transl. big man). His parents owned 37 hectares (91 acres) of land, but struggled financially. Didžiulis completed just three years of primary education. In 1912, he moved to Riga to work in the docks and metalworking factory. During a dockworkers' strike in 1913, he was involved in distributing social democratic literature. In October 1914, after the outbreak of World War I, he returned to his family's farm.

In late 1918, after the German revolution, Didžiulis joined a local pro-communist group in Žagarė. In January 1919, at the start of the Lithuanian–Soviet War, he organized communist soviet and police in Šakyna. These institutions were disbanded by February 1919.

=== Interwar Lithuania ===
In June 1919, Didžiulis established contacts with Lithuanian communists and joined the Communist Party of Lithuania. At first he worked with local communists in Joniškis and Šiauliai. In September 1921, he was tasked by the party with transport and distribution of illegal communist literature, including the periodicals Tiesa and Komunistas.

In September 1922, Didžiulis was arrested when he transported literature to Vilkaviškis. Even though the Lithuanian police found only legal publications, Didžiulis was confined to a camp in Aukštoji Freda and later the Fifth Fort of Kaunas Fortress. He was released in September 1923. The party then sent him to study at the Communist University of the National Minorities of the West in Moscow. He returned to Lithuania in August 1925 and organized communist activities in the Šiauliai area.

After the coup d'état in December 1926, many two members of the Central Committee of the Communist Party of Lithuania were executed while a few others were arrested. As a result, the Central Committee coopted Didžiulis in January 1927. Later that year, he was also elected to the Politburo and Secretariat. However, he was arrested in January 1928 after the police searched his apartment and found numerous illegal publications. In May 1929, he was sentenced to eight years in prison. He served the sentence in Kaunas Prison, Ninth Fort, and Šiauliai Prison. He was released in October 1933, but again arrested and imprisoned for three months in November 1933.

Released, Didžiulis continued communist activities. In late 1934, he travelled to Moscow to consult and coordinate with other Lithuanian communists. At the time the Communist Party had two main leaders – Vincas Kapsukas and Zigmas Angarietis – who competed for influence. Didžiulis and Aizikas Lifšicas allied with Kapsukas who died in February 1935. This allowed Angarietis to promote his man Kazys Sprindys to the Secretariat. With the help of Mikhail Trilisser, leader of the Comintern, Lifšicas attempted to remove Angarietis. Sprindis was replaced by Icikas Meskupas-Adomas but Didžiulis and Lifšicas were demoted to regional (raikom) party work in Suvalkija and Klaipėda Region. While in Suvalkija, Didžiulis rallied communist forces in support of the 1935 Suvalkija farmers' strike. He opposed the party's position of not allying with non-communists and wanted to collaborate with other parties (including the Lithuanian Christian Democratic Party) that supported the strike.

Didžiulis was arrested again for three weeks in January 1936 and three months in November 1936. In June 1938, he organized 10-day courses for young communists near Alytus. After these courses, he was arrested and sent to the Dimitravas forced labour camp for a year. He was arrested again in October 1939 and sent back to Dimitravas and later to the Pabradė forced labor camp. In total, he spent about nine years in Lithuanian prisons.

=== Lithuanian SSR ===
==== 1940–1941 ====
He was freed from the forced labor camp after the Soviet occupation of Lithuania in June 1940. The People's Government of Lithuania appointed him as its envoy to Vilnius and Vilnius Region (with rights of a minister). According to memoirs of Vincas Krėvė-Mickevičius, Didžiulis was given this assignment (effective July 1) to give communists a majority over Lithuanian nationalist members of the government. He was elected to the People's Seimas as a candidate of the Union of the Working People of Lithuania. According to early voting results published by Darbo Lietuva, Didžiulis received 93,375 votes out of approximately 178,000 total votes (thus roughly 52%). However, later "official" results claimed that 99.2% of voters voted for the Union of the Working People (no official results by candidate were ever published).

Didžiulis was one of twenty representatives sent to Moscow to request the Soviet Union to accept the newly established Lithuanian SSR as one of its constituent republics. People's Seimas reorganized itself as the Supreme Soviet of the Lithuanian SSR and Didžiulis became deputy of Justas Paleckis, chairman of the presidium of the Supreme Soviet. At the same time, he became the agricultural department of the Central Committee of the Communist Party of Lithuania. In this capacity, he led the Soviet efforts to nationalize landholdings. In a year, about 600,000 hectares (1,500,000 acres) of land was nationalized. The Soviets did not establish kolkhozs but distributed land to landless peasants.

==== 1941–1958 ====
After the German invasion of the Soviet Union in June 1941, Didžiulis evacuated to Penza where he became a representative of the Council of People's Commissars in charge of the affairs of evacuated Lithuanians in the Penza region. In June 1943, he became party organizer (partorg) in Pereslavl-Zalessky where several Lithuanian artist assemblies had gathered.

In July 1944, after Vilnius was retaken by the Soviets as a result of the Operation Bagration, he returned to Vilnius and resumed his pre-war positions: deputy chairman of the presidium of the Supreme Soviet and work in a commission in charge of the land reform. He also taught the history of the Communist Party of the Soviet Union at the party school in Vilnius. He was elected three times (in 1947, 1951, and 1955) to the Supreme Soviet of the Lithuanian SSR and twice (in 1955 and 1958) to the Supreme Soviet of the Soviet Union.

Didžiulis participated in Soviet repressions against the Lithuanians. In 1945, he dealt with property confiscated of people deported to Siberia from Trakai and Kretinga districts. In May 1948, he supervised and instructed party activists on how to carry out the Operation Vesna in Biržai district. In October 1951, during the Operation Osen, his sister-in-law Ana and her son were deported from his family's farm in Mandeikiai, but Soviet officials quickly intervened and she was freed from the deportee train in Ostashkov.

From 1947 to 1958, Didžiulis was the chairman of the Supreme Court of the Lithuanian SSR. On 25 September 1957, the court handed death sentence to Adolfas Ramanauskas, one of the most prominent Lithuanian partisans.

=== Death and legacy ===
For his service to communist causes, Didžiulis was awarded two Orders of Lenin and two Orders of the Red Banner of Labour. Didžiulis died on 24 May 1958 and was buried at the in Antakalnis Cemetery.

During the Soviet era, the polytechnic institute in Šiauliai (present-day Šiauliai State College) as well as the secondary school in Žagarė were named in his honor. Streets in Vilnius, Šiauliai, and Panevėžys bore his name. His memoir and selected writings were published in 1963.

== Bibliography ==
- Ėmužis, Marius (2016). Sovietų Lietuvos valdantysis elitas 1944-1974 metais: tarpusavio ryšiai ir jų raiška (PhD thesis) (in Lithuanian). Vilnius: Vilnius University.
- Labanauskas, Ramūnas (2010). "Jaunųjų katalikų sąjūdžio santykis su komunizmo doktrina ir praktika (1936–1940)" (PDF). LKMA Metraštis. Serija B: Bažnyčios istorijos studijos (in Lithuanian). XXXII. ISSN 1392-0502.
- Raškauskas, Kęstutis (2014). Revoliucinės kultūros eksperimentas Lietuvoje (1927–1935 m.) (PhD thesis) (in Lithuanian). Kaunas: Vytautas Magnus University. ISBN 978-9955-12-982-0.
- Šarmaitis, Romas (1988). Lietuvos revoliucionieriai (PDF) (in Lithuanian). Mintis. pp. 119–137. ISBN 5-417-00071-X.
- Senn, Alfred Erich (2007). Lithuania 1940: Revolution from Above. On the Boundary of Two Worlds. Identity, Freedom, and Moral Imagination of the Baltics. Rodopi. ISBN 978-90-420-2225-6.
- Senn, Alfred Erich (2013). "Problems of Baltic Historiography, 1939–41". In Clemmesen, Michael H.; Faulkner, Marcus S. (eds.). Northern European Overture to War, 1939-1941: From Memel to Barbarossa. Brill. ISBN 9789004249097.
- Starkauskas, Juozas (2007). Represinių struktūrų ir komunistų partijos bendradarbiavimas įtvirtinant okupacinį režimą Lietuvoje 1944–1953 m. (in Lithuanian). Lietuvos gyventojų genocido ir rezistencijos tyrimo centras. ISBN 978-9986757764.
- Tininis, Vytautas (4 November 2022) [2018]. "Karolis Didžiulis". Visuotinė lietuvių enciklopedija (in Lithuanian). Mokslo ir enciklopedijų leidybos centras.
- Truska, Liudas (2004). Preconditions of The Holocaust: The Upsurge of Anti-Semitism in Lithuania in the years of the Soviet Occupation (1940–1941) (PDF). International Commission for the Evaluation of the Nazi and Soviet Occupation Regimes in Lithuania.
- Tyla, Antanas, ed. (1995). Lietuvos gyventojų trėmimai 1940–1941, 1944–1953 metais sovietinės okupacinės valdžios dokumentuose (in Lithuanian). Lietuvos istorijos institutas. ISBN 9986-577-11-X.
