= Pabradė forced labour camp =

Forced labour camp in Lithuania (1939–1944)

- Location: Pabradė, Lithuania
- Status: Closed
- Security class: Forced labour camp
- Population: 183 (April 1940)
- Opened: November 1939
- Closed: July 1944

Pabradė forced labour camp (Lithuanian: Pabradės priverčiamojo darbo stovykla) was a forced labour camp established by the authoritarian regime of President Antanas Smetona in 1939 in the former Polish military barracks near Pabradė in the present-day Švenčionys District Municipality, Lithuania. The camp was closed after the Soviet occupation of Lithuania in June 1940.

== Interwar Lithuania ==
Before 1939, Pabradė was part of the Second Polish Republic. Lithuania gained the town when the Soviet Union transferred a portion of Vilnius Region according to the Soviet–Lithuanian Mutual Assistance Treaty of October 1939. As the Dimitravas forced labour camp was running out of capacity, the Lithuanian government established another forced labour camp in the former Polish military barracks that were located about 2 kilometres (1.2 mi) from the town in November 1939. The camp was established based on the Law on Forced Labour Institutions adopted by the Fourth Seimas on 10 November 1936. It started operations in January 1940.

The government sent criminal and political prisoners to the camp when it lacked evidence for conviction. Since Lithuania was under martial law, the prisoners were sent to the camp without trial based on administrative orders by military commandants or county governors. The prisoners had to be between the ages of 17 and 60. The prisoners could be held for up to a year; bad behavior could earn additional six months. The prisoners worked breaking stones and digging peat.

At the end of April 1940, the camp held 92 political and 91 criminal prisoners. Notable prisoners included communists Karolis Didžiulis, Boleslovas Baranauskas, Solomonas Atamukas, Alteris Kleineris, Aleksas Maginskas, Domas Pundzius, Jokūbas Vicas. In May 1940, several leaders of voldemarininkai were arrested and sent to the camp. In June 1940, the Lithuanian police arrested construction workers who went on strike in Kaunas and sent some of them to the camp.

The camp was closed after the Soviet occupation of Lithuania in June 1940.

== German occupation ==
During the German occupation of Lithuania, the camp was reestablished on 15 May 1942. Its warden was the Lithuanian policeman Pranas Mačiulis.

Most people were sent to the camp for avoiding various forced labour projects by the German authorities. According to a daily schedule from September 1942, the prisoners worked from 7 a.m. to 6 p.m. with a one-hour lunch break and ten-minute breaks every hour. On rest days and holidays, prisoners were allowed to meet with relatives. Escapes from the camp were frequent. From October 1942 to February 1944, at least 328 prisoners escaped. Germans suspected that a Lithuanian guard was taking bribes and allowing the prisoners to escape.

In April 1943, administrative office of the camp was moved to Vilnius. In August 1943, the camp employed a total of 42 personnel. In March 1943, the camp opened a branch near Rūdninkai. On 25 May 1944, the camp in Rūdninkai was attacked by the Soviet partisans. They burned down the camp's administration and killed two guards. Out of 27 prisoners, 16 escaped but 11 later returned to the camp.

The date the Pabradė camp was closed is unknown. It is likely that it continued to function until the territory was captured by the Red Army in early July 1944.

=== Prisoner statistics ===
Number of prisoners at the camp
As of	Men	Women	Total
1 Aug 1942	53	6	59
30 Sep 1942	50	7	57
1 Dec 1942	86	5	91
1 Jan 1943	97	4	101
31 Mar 1943	71	2	73
28 May 1943	232	23	255
6 Jun 1944	64	16	80

Newly admitted prisoners by period
Period	Men	Women	Total
Aug–Sep 1942	25	5	30
Oct–Nov 1942	81	2	83
Dec–Jan 1942	70	4	74
Feb–Mar 1943	79	4	83
Apr–May 1943	339	36	375
May – 15 Mar 1944	?	?	?
15 Mar – May 1944	155	45	200

== See also ==
- Varniai concentration camp
