= Veiveriai =

- Town
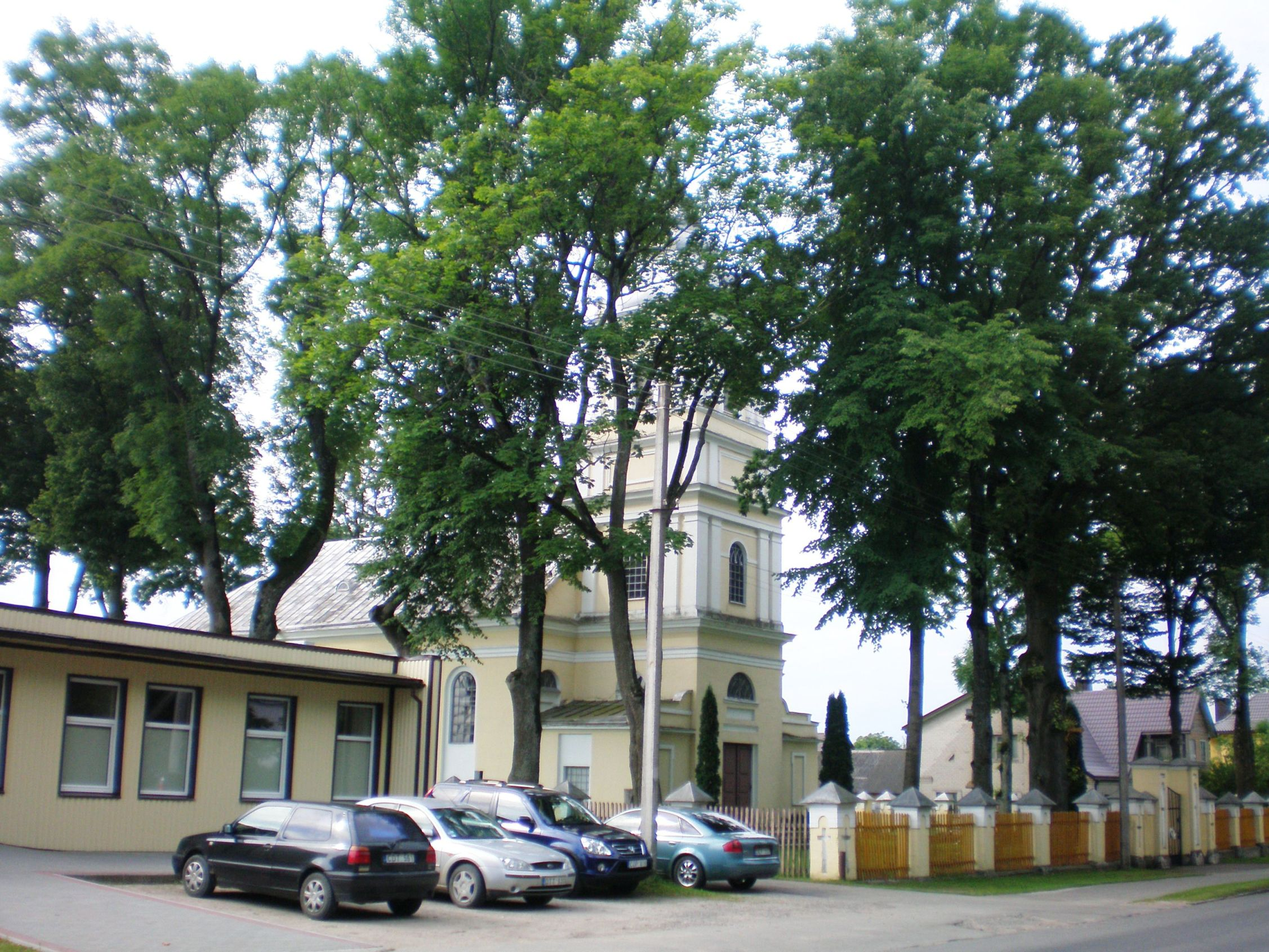
- Veiveriai church

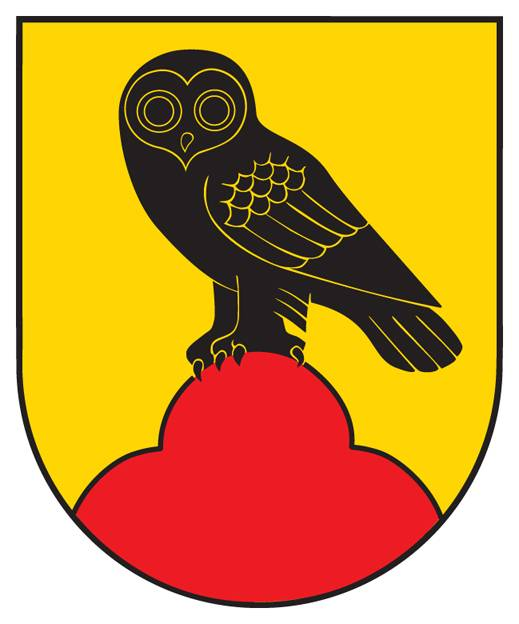
- Coat of arms

- Location of Veiveriai
- Coordinates: 54°45′50″N 23°43′30″E
- Country: Lithuania
- Ethnographic region: Suvalkija
- County: Kaunas County
- Municipality: Prienai district municipality
- Eldership: Veiveriai eldership
- Capital of: Veiveriai eldership
- First mentioned: 1744

Population (2011)
  - Total: 1,167
- Time zone: UTC+2 (EET)
  - Summer (DST): UTC+3 (EEST)

Veiveriai is a town in Lithuania. It is located about 18 kilometres (11 mi) southwest of Kaunas on the E67 road to Marijampolė. According to the 2011 census, its population was 1,167.

== History ==
Year	Population
1827	249
1897	921
1923	813
1959	693
1970	775
1979	859
1987	902

The town was first mentioned in written sources in 1744, but began growing a century later when a large postal station was established on the Kaunas–Suwałki road, part of a longer Berlin–St. Petersburg route, in 1838–1839. Mail coaches would stop here to change horses and pick up passengers. The office was closed after the postal route was superseded by the Warsaw–Saint Petersburg Railway, built in 1859–1861. During the Uprising of 1863, a battle occurred between local rebels (some 620 men) and Russians army on August 21, 1863. Poorly armed rebels were defeated and lost about 80 men before retreating. After establishment of the teachers' seminary, Veiveriai grew as a center of education and culture. In 1935, during an economic crisis, the town was part of fierce farmers' protests against the government of Antanas Smetona. Two protesters were killed. After World War II, Veiveriai supported armed anti-Soviet resistance. In 1989 Skausmo kalnelis (Hill of Sorrows) was created where bodies of killed resistance fighters were buried. The hill was incorporated into the town's coat of arms, adopted in 2004.

== Education ==
In 1866 Tsarist authorities established teachers' courses (in 1872 reorganized into the Veiveriai Teachers' Seminary) in the old post office building. The seminary trained teachers for elementary schools in the Suwałki Governorate and became and important center of the Lithuanian National Revival. During World War I, the seminary was evacuated into Russia, but never returned. Its former building was used to establish a secondary school in 1919. The school was named after Tomas Žilinkas, who taught at the teachers' seminary for 37 years and encouraged his students to read banned Lithuanian books. As of May 2008, the school had 458 students and 45 teachers. In 1989 a music school was established in Veiveriai. In 1994 it was renamed after opera singer Antanas Kučingis and expanded to include non-musical specialties. The school has 120 students and 17 teachers.

== Religion ==
The first chapel in Veiveriai was built in the second half of the 18th century. In 1818 nobles of the Godlewski family built a wooden church, staffed by vicars from Zapyškis. Since 1846 Veiveriai, as a center of a parish, had its own priests. In 1853 Józef Godlewski built a brick Neo-Renaissance church, named after Saint Louis. The church was reconstructed in 1930s when Mykolas Krupavičius, alumni of the teachers' seminary, briefly served in Veiveriai.
