= 1935 Suvalkija farmers' strike =

Labor strike in Lithuania

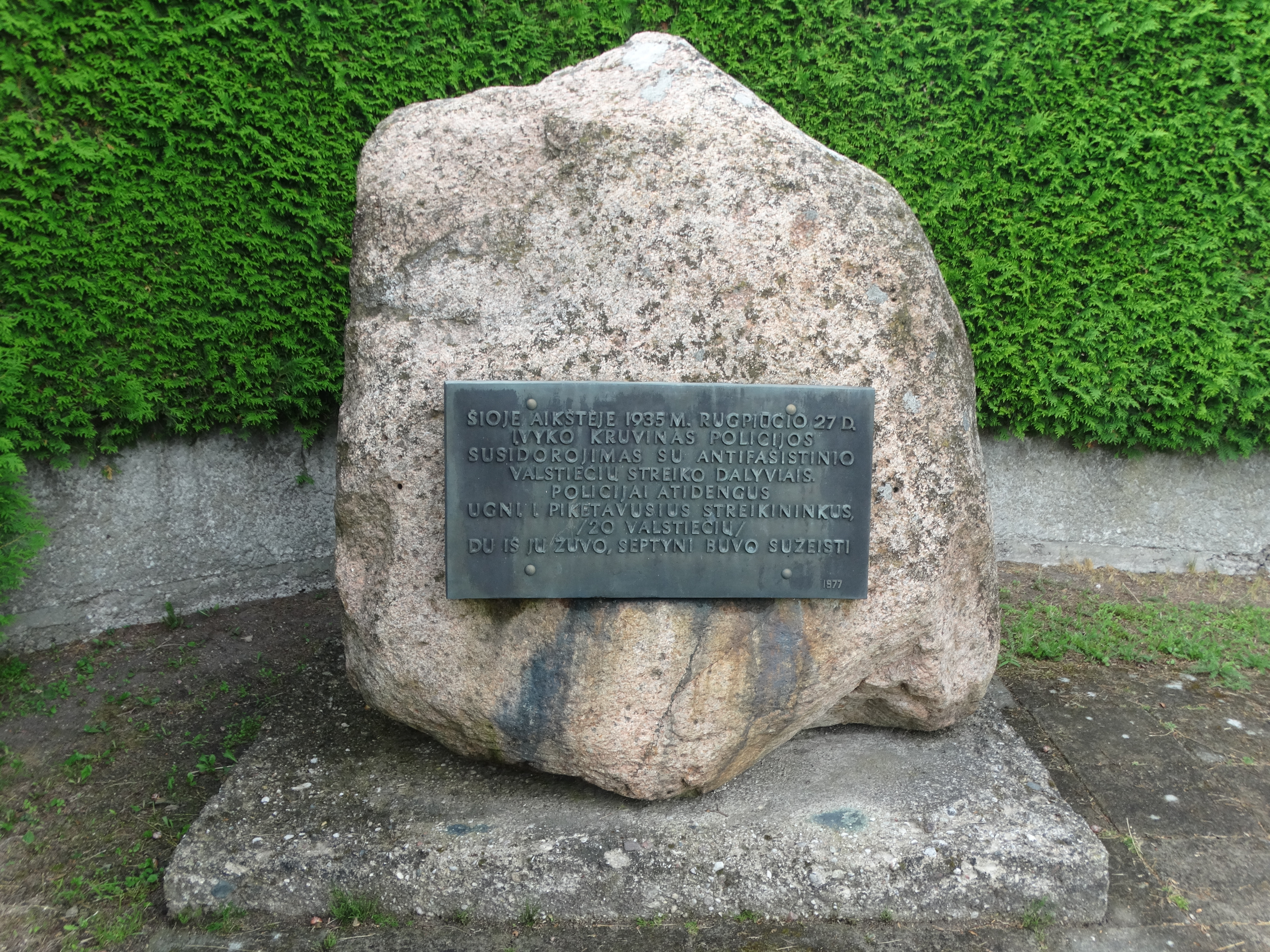
Memorial stone in Veiveriai erected in 1977

The farmers' strike in Suvalkija was a civil unrest in interwar Lithuania in 1935. It mostly affected Suvalkija (southern Lithuania) where farmers demanded aid to help with a severe economic crisis.

The strike was caused by more than threefold decrease in prices of agricultural goods due to the collapse of Lithuanian exports. Germany (the largest trading partner) ceased Lithuanian imports due to the worsening political situation (territorial claims to the Klaipėda Region and specifically the trial of Neumann and Sass), while the United Kingdom (the second largest export market) enacted protectionist policies due to the Great Depression.

As a result, farmers could not pay their loans or taxes and their discontent was fanned by the outlawed Communist Party of Lithuania. Their demands were mostly financial (e.g. lower taxes, deferral of loans), but there were also political demands to replace the authoritarian regime of President Antanas Smetona. They began organizing in May 1935 and started a general strike (refusal to pay taxes or sell their products) on 20 August 1935. Mass protest rallies soon turned into violent clashes with the police (most notably in Veiveriai on 27 August), which left five strikers dead. By December 1935, the strike subsided and turned into terrorist incidents aiming to intimidate local officials and those who refused to join the strike. A police officer was shot and killed in November 1936.

A total of 253 people were tried by a military court for their involvement with the strike. Nineteen people were sentenced to death, of which five were executed, while the rest were pardoned. The government blamed the opposition parties (particularly the Lithuanian Christian Democratic Party and the Lithuanian Popular Peasants' Union) for inciting the strike and suspended them in November 1935. Further, all political parties (except the ruling Lithuanian Nationalist Union) were banned in February 1936.

== Economic crisis ==
Economy of interwar Lithuania was dependent on agriculture. About 85% of people worked in the agricultural sector. It was a rapidly developing sector as farmers took out loans to expand and improve their farms, acquire fertilizers and machinery, etc. Their products were purchased by processing and export companies that monopolized their markets: Pienocentras for milk, Maistas for meat, and Lietūkis for grain. These three companies alone accounted for about half of the exports of Lithuania.

However, due to the Great Depression, exports fell sharply in the early 1930s. Lithuanian agricultural products were primarily exported to Germany (it accounted for 59% of all Lithuanian exports in 1929). However, as Hitler came to power, bilateral relations worsened due to the German territorial claims to Klaipėda Region. Exports to Germany practically ceased after the trial of Neumann and Sass. Germany even blocked Lithuanian efforts to export to other countries (e.g. France or Czechoslovakia) via German territory. Lithuania attempted to redirect its exports to England which was the second largest export market at 17% of all exports in 1929. However, after the British Empire Economic Conference, England imposed import quotas and duties. Further, the British pound was devalued. Due to lower prices and lower volumes, Lithuania's exports in 1934 accounted for just 28% of exports in 1929.

The situation was further complicated by the monetary policy. Lithuania kept the value of litas stable, which meant lower prices in the domestic market and uncompetitive exports. Such policy benefited those receiving stable wages and lenders, but was devastating to producers and borrowers. As a result, prices began to fall sharply. For example, the export price for a centner of wheat dropped from an average 47 Lithuanian litas in 1924–1928 to just 13 litas in 1934–1936. The prices that farmers received saw even larger declines. A farmer could sell a centner of wheat for 30–32 litas in 1928, and only for 3–5 litas in 1935. Overall, prices for agricultural products declined about 3.4 times. As a result, farmers could not pay their loans, taxes, or wages to their employees.

== Organizing the strike ==
Signs of discontent emerged in 1934. However, they were isolated incidents of farmers refusing to pay taxes, disrupting foreclosure auctions, attacking bailiffs or police officers, etc. The Communist Party of Lithuania (then outlawed in Lithuania) fanned the discontent, encouraged organized resistance, and sent its agitators and instructors. One of such communist activists was Karolis Didžiulis. Just in August–September 1935, the Communist Party published and distributed nine different proclamations. During the period of the Lithuanian SSR, communist role in the strike was exaggerated and the strike was portrayed as a "joint struggle against fascism." Other organizations also participated in the strike and distributed proclamations, including Farmers' Unity and voldemarininkai.

The farmers were most active in Suvalkija (districts of Marijampolė, Vilkaviškis, Šakiai, Sejny). This region, due an earlier abolition of serfdom, was an affluent agricultural region. Its farmers borrowed larger sums for farm improvements. The region was also better educated and was closer to the border with East Prussia (Germany) which allowed strikers to print various proclamations and smuggle weapons. Outside of Suvalkija, there were active strikers in the districts of Alytus, Trakai, Raseiniai as well as sympathizers across Lithuania.

The farmers began organizing in late May 1935. Meetings about a coordinated farmers' strike (refusal to pay taxes and sell their products) occurred in summer 1935. A key meeting took place in Gustaičiai attended by 25 representatives from the districts of Marijampolė, Vilkaviškis, Šakiai, Alytus. This meeting elected a committee that issued a proclamation calling for a general strike to start on 20 August 1935 and continue for a month. To ensure that farmers did not deliver their products to sell to city residents, strikers organized road blocks.

The farmers demanded to lower taxes, suspend repayment of loans, cancel foreclosure auctions, and increase in the purchase price of agricultural goods. However, there was also a group of farmers that made political demands to replace the government of Antanas Smetona and to restore democracy.

== Strike ==
=== Clashes with police ===
On 25 August, about 3,000 people attended a protest in Prienai (the largest protest of the strike). It dispersed peacefully, but the following day the police started arresting the main organizers. On 27 August, the arrested organizers were transported to Kaunas but the police vehicles were stopped by protesters near Išlaužas. After a violent clash, the vehicles were smashed and prisoners were freed. Order was restored only after the government sent a hundred mounted policemen. Seven policemen were injured, and one striker Antanas Zablackas died of injuries.

On 27 August, in Veiveriai, strikers attempted to intimidate and expel from the town's marketplace farmers who did not join the strike. When police attempted to disperse the strikers (about 50 men), one striker shot a policeman in the leg. The police responded with fire. The shootout left two strikers (Juozas Gustaitis (Note: Juozas Gustaitis was a member of the Lithuanian Nationalist Union.) and Stasys Veiverys (Note: Stasys Veiverys was a leader of a local chapter of Young Lithuania.)) dead, five strikers and three policemen injured.

On 27 August, communist activists organized a protest that attracted about 600 people in Butrimonys. They also clashed with the police. The following day, there were clashes with the police in Balbieriškis and Daugai. On 30 August, there was a clash in Birštonas.

On 21 September, in Gražiškiai, police arrested three strike organizers (including farmer Pranas Eidukaitis). About 300 farmers gathered at the local police station and forced the police to free the arrested people. More arrest followed with another attempt to free the detained on 23 September. During this clash, striker Jurgis Abramavičius was killed, and two others were injured.

On 12 October, strikers attempted to disarm a group of Lithuanian Riflemen. Striker Juozas Alkevičius was killed in the incident.

On 12 December, there was a clash with the police in Plokščiai. On 16 February 1936 (anniversary of the Act of Independence of Lithuania), more than 1,000 attended a demonstration in Šakiai.

=== Terrorist incidents ===
The general strike subsided by December 1935. Mass protests were replaced by terrorist incidents, including attacks on administrative offices and officials, damage to telephone wires, reprisals against those who refused to join the strike, etc. A number of local officials received threatening notes and letters. According to a report by the State Security Department from 1939, in total, 133 telephone posts were cut, 32 farms were set on fire, and 20 dairy collections points were destroyed.

On 9 November 1936, an unknown man entered the police station in Gražiškiai and shot dead police chief Liudas Lietuvninkas. He was given an official funeral. His art deco tombstone designed by the architect Vytautas Kašuba was added to the Registry of Cultural Heritage in 1993.

By fall 1936, terrorist incidents diminished. Former strikers continued to look for opportunities to organize a new strike with the help of the political opposition of the Smetona's regime. These efforts were unsuccessful and tapered off by fall 1937.

== Trials and executions ==
938 people received administrative sentences (i.e. without trial). A total of 253 people were tried by a military court (due to martial law which was in effect in Lithuania). Trials continued until 1938. Attorneys Antanas Tumėnas, Mykolas Sleževičius, Liuda Purėnienė represented some of the defendants pro bono. 19 people received death sentences, but 14 were pardoned by the president. 8 people received life sentences, 184 people received 1 to 15 years in prison. Many of the sentences were later commuted. For example, Jurgis Čėsna was initially sentenced to death, but was released in May 1938.

Four people (Petras Šarkauskas, (Note: Petras Šarkauskas (born 1905) owned 51 hectares (130 acres) of land. He was a member of the Lithuanian Riflemen's Union and a secretary of a local chapter of the Lithuanian Nationalist Union in Kaupiškiai.) Bronius Pratasevičius, (Note: Bronius Pratasevičius (born 1908) owned 21 hectares (52 acres) of land. He did not belong to any organizations.) Kazys Narkevičius, (Note: Kazys Narkevičius (born 1899) owned 21 hectares (52 acres) of land. He was previously sentenced for involvement in the Kaunas garrison mutiny in 1920 and for making moonshine. He was a treasurer of a local chapter of the Farmers' Unity.) and Alfonsas Petrauskas (Note: Alfonsas Petrauskas (born 1908) lived with parents who owned 51 hectares (130 acres) of land. He was a member of the Catholic youth organization Pavasaris.)) were executed by a firing squad at the VI Fort of Kaunas Fortress at 3:33 am on 23 May 1935. They organized a group of men who transported anti-government proclamations from Germany (police confiscated 25,680 copies), kept a cache of weapons and bullets, and attacked a farmer returning from a market. ELTA, the Lithuanian news agency, disseminated a press release about their execution which included and unsigned explanation that these men maintained contacts with foreign anti-government agents (i.e. Germany) and thus could not be pardoned.

The fifth person (Aleksandras Maurušaitis) was executed in the gas chamber on 21 October 1937. Among other crimes, Maurušaitis was accused of murder, arson at the farm of Jonas Pranas Aleksa (former Minister of Agriculture), shootout with the police while resisting arrest.

In September 1940, three months after the Soviet occupation of Lithuania, Soviet police arrested police officer Mikas Radzevičius for shooting at the strikers in Veiveriai.

== Aftermath ==
=== Government changes ===
As a result of the unrest, a new government was formed on 6 September 1935. However, Prime Minister Juozas Tūbelis and most ministers remained the same, only Jonas Pranas Aleksa (Minister of Agriculture) and Steponas Rusteika (Minister of the Internal Affairs) resigned. In a press interview Tūbelis denied that government changes were caused by the strike. On 13 September 1935, police arrested Jonas Lapėnas, the former director of Maistas and former chairman of the Nationalist Union, and accused him of corruption. He was sentenced to eight years in prison, but later acquitted.

The economic crisis and Germany's boycott of Lithuanian exports forced Lithuania to make concessions. Negotiations with Nazi Germany started in March 1936 and a trade treaty was concluded on 5 August 1936. The exports to Germany rebounded, but Lithuania pardoned most of the defendants in the trial of Neumann and Sass and could not take more decisive actions to curb the pro-Nazi propaganda in the Klaipėda Region.

The government made some moves to alleviate the economic hardship of the farmers. The land tax was reduced by 10% and eliminated for three years for new farmers. Repayment of loans to the government owned Land Bank were deferred until 1937. In some instances, foreclosures were delayed.

=== Suppression of the opposition ===
The government and its official newspaper Lietuvos aidas variously blamed the communists, foreign forces (i.e. Nazi Germany), or local troublemakers (i.e. landless peasants, seasonal farm workers, criminals). The newspaper portrayed farmers as confused, misguided, or coerced by these nefarious forces. Farmers and the military were key supporters of the ruling Lithuanian Nationalist Union. The government also blamed the opposition parties on organizing the strike. There is some evidence that opposition parties (Lithuanian Christian Democratic Party, Lithuanian Popular Peasants' Union, Communist Party of Lithuania, Social Democratic Party of Lithuania) attempted to organize a joint popular front during the strike.

On 12 October 1935, former presidents and ministers from opposition parties (Lithuanian Christian Democratic Party members Aleksandras Stulginskis, Pranas Dovydaitis, Antanas Tumėnas and Lithuanian Popular Peasants' Union members Kazys Grinius, Mykolas Sleževičius, and Ernestas Galvanauskas) sent a memorandum to President Smetona. They urged the government to take immediate actions to solve the crisis; the most important of such actions would be forming a coalition government that would include members of the opposition and organizing democratic elections to the Seimas (parliament). In response, on 7 November, the government suspended both of these political parties for "activities harmful to the nation and the state". Further, all political parties (except the Nationalist Union) were banned in February 1936. While elections to the Fourth Seimas of Lithuania were held in June 1936, the Nationalist Union ensured its full control of the legislature.

== Bibliography ==
- Adomaitis, Justinas (22 February 2002). "Skaudu tik dėl žemės". Abipus žemės (in Lithuanian). 4 (31).
- Balkus, Mindaugas (2012). "1935-1936 m. Užnemunės ūkininkų streikas: propagandos ir viešosios nuomonės apžvalga" (PDF). Lietuvos istorijos metraštis (in Lithuanian). 1: 103–118. ISSN 2538-6549.
- Brinius, Deividas (2010). Pasaulinė ekonominė krizė ir Lietuvos valstybės ekonominė politika (Thesis) (in Lithuanian). Šiauliai University.
- Černevičiūtė, Sigita (2013). "Mirties bausmės taikymo praktika: 1935–1936 m. Suvalkijos ūkininkų streikas". Istorija (in Lithuanian). 92: 22–31. ISSN 2029-7181.
- Eidintas, Alfonsas (2015). Antanas Smetona and His Lithuania: From the National Liberation Movement to an Authoritarian Regime (1893-1940). On the Boundary of Two Worlds. Translated by Alfred Erich Senn. Brill Rodopi. ISBN 9789004302037.
- Eidintas, Alfonsas; Žalys, Vytautas; Senn, Alfred Erich (1999). Tuskenis, Edvardas (ed.). Lithuania in European Politics: The Years of the First Republic, 1918-1940 (Paperback ed.). New York: St. Martin's Press. ISBN 0-312-22458-3.
- ELTA (18 September 1940). "Byla dėl Veiverių valstiečių šaudymo". Darbo Lietuva (in Lithuanian). Vol. 113. p. 1.
- Jokubauskas, Vytautas (2019). Netiesioginis poveikis ir Lietuvos karinis saugumas 1919–1940 m. (in Lithuanian). Klaipėda: Klaipėdos universitetas. ISBN 978-609-404-277-5.
- Kazlauskas, Albinas (2008). "Gyvą nuteisė, mirusį – išteisino" (PDF). Šiaurietiški atsivėrimai (in Lithuanian). 1 (24). ISSN 1392-6810.
- Kulikauskas, Gediminas (2 January 2009). "Krizis tarpukario Lietuvoje (II dalis)". Verslo žinios (in Lithuanian).
- Labanauskas, Ramūnas (2010). "Jaunųjų katalikų sąjūdžio santykis su komunizmo doktrina ir praktika (1936–1940)" (PDF). LKMA Metraštis. Serija B: Bažnyčios istorijos studijos (in Lithuanian). XXXII: 204–206. ISSN 1392-0502.
- Lukšas, Aras (28 August 2009). "Neramus 1935-ųjų rugpjūtis". Lietuvos žinios (in Lithuanian).
- Piročkinas, Arnoldas (19 September 2013). "Du Lietuvos ekonomikos 1920–1940 m. dėmenys (2)" (PDF). Mokslo Lietuva (in Lithuanian). 16 (504). ISSN 1392-7191.
- Rudokas, Jonas (2019). Juozo Tūbelio laikai (in Lithuanian). Vilnius: Žemės trauka. ISBN 978-9955-705-32-1.
- Ruzgaitis, I. (21 November 1961). "Keletas faktų apie tariamąjį Suvalkijos ūkininkų streiką" (PDF). Vienybė (in Lithuanian). p. 5.
- Šarmaitis, Romas, ed. (1978). Lietuvos Komunistų partijos istorijos apybraiža: 1920–1940 (in Lithuanian). Vol. 2. Vilnius: Mintis.
- Tamošaitis, Mindaugas (2011). Valstiečiai liaudininkai Lietuvos politiniame gyvenime 1926–1940 m. (PhD thesis) (in Lithuanian). Vytautas Magnus University. pp. 165–166.
- Vaskela, Gediminas (5 May 2005). "Lietuvos ūkis 1929-1938 metais" (in Lithuanian). Archived from the original on 7 February 2008.
- Žilinskas, Antanas (29 July 2020). "Suvalkijos ūkininkų neramumai, sukrėtę Lietuvos valdžią" (in Lithuanian). Mūsų saveitė.
- Zinkus, Jonas; et al., eds. (1985–1988). "Lietuvos valstiečių streikas". Tarybų Lietuvos enciklopedija. Vol. 2. Vilnius: Vyriausioji enciklopedijų redakcija. pp. 605–606. OCLC 20017802.
