= Vladas Niunka =

Lithuanian communist politician

- Born: 17 August 1907; Baisogala, Kovno Governorate, Russian Empire
- Died: 26 December 1983 (aged 76); Vilnius, Lithuanian SSR
- Burial place: Antakalnis Cemetery
- Education: Vytautas Magnus University
- Occupations: Newspaper editor, communist propagandist and politician, university professor
- Political party: Communist Party of Lithuania
- Awards: Order of Lenin; Order of the October Revolution; Order of the Red Banner of Labour; Order of the Patriotic War; Order of the Badge of Honour

Vladas Niunka (17 August 1907 – 26 December 1983) was a Lithuanian communist politician and publicist. He joined then-illegal Communist Party of Lithuania (CPL) in 1928. For his communist activities, he was arrested seven times by the Lithuanian police and spent about five years in prisons. He edited and published several communist newspapers, including Tiesa, Propagandistas, Komunistas. He was a long-term member of the Central Committee of CPL (1938–1983) as well as deputy (1947–1983) and chairman (1955–1963) of the Supreme Soviet of the Lithuanian SSR. During World War II and in 1948–1961, Niunka was secretary of the Propaganda and Agitation Department of CPL. He dedicated the last two decades of his life to academic work researching anti-communist policies and activities of the Catholic Church. He became a member of the Lithuanian Academy of Sciences and a Candidate of Sciences.

== Education ==
Niunka was born in Baisogala to a family of a postal worker and seamstress. In 1919, he enrolled at the Šiauliai Gymnasium and graduated in 1925. He continued his studies at the University of Kaunas. Due to financial difficulties, he could not attend classes in Kaunas and instead took correspondence courses in law while working as a teacher in Šiauliai. In 1925–1928, he taught Lithuanian language at a high school. Due to frequent arrests and imprisonments, he obtained the law diploma only in 1939.

== Independent Lithuania ==
While visiting Kaunas, he became interested in communism. At the time, the Communist Party of Lithuania (CPL) and its press were outlawed in Lithuania. Niunka was arrested in April 1927 for the possession of an illegal communist newspaper. That time he was released, but became a person of interest to the Lithuanian intelligence. In May 1928, Niunka took a more active role in the communist underground – he wrote articles to communist newspapers and helped smuggling communist publications from Kaunas to Šiauliai. For that he was arrested in November 1928 and sentenced to imprisonment at the Varniai concentration camp. There were many other communists at the camp and they organized self-education in communist theory. The camp was closed bringing Niunka's release in October 1931.

Niunka returned to Šiauliai and took up private lessons. He became a leader of the regional communist section. He was arrested in February 1933 and sentenced to three months in Šiauliai Prison. Upon release, Niunka moved to Kaunas where he joined Kaunas district communist committee and edited its newspaper Revoliucinis darbininkas. He was arrested again in August 1935 (one-month imprisonment) and July 1936 (two-month imprisonment).

Antanas Sniečkus returned to Lithuania in 1936 and began looking for new people to fill leadership positions within the CPL. Niunka was co-opted to the Central Committee of CPL in mid-1937. He also edited Tiesa and published Propagandistas for political education of the party. He was tasked with approaching left-wing activists (social-democrats and others) about creating a unified popular front. He published newspapers Liaudies frontas and Antifašistas aimed at this, but ultimately he was not successful. He was arrested in May 1938 and imprisoned for nine months in Dimitravas forced labor camp. He was arrested again in July 1939 and sent for a year to the same camp in Dimitravas.

== World War II ==
On 15 June 1940, Lithuania was occupied by the Soviet Union. Niunka was freed on 18 June and appointed editor of Tiesa (then known as Liaudies balsas). He was involved in the show elections to the People's Seimas: helped draft the new election law and became chairman of the electoral commission. Niunka was given only 12 hours to prepare the law which allowed only one candidate per seat. He helped to falsify the election results. From August 1940 to May 1944, he was the chief prosecutor of the Lithuanian SSR.

When Nazi Germany invaded in June 1941, Niunka evacuated to Moscow. There he joined the propaganda section of the CPL and worked publishing communist press. In April 1944, he became the second secretary of CPL but was quickly dismissed by Mikhail Suslov for "softness". Niunka was elected to the Politburo of CPL in August 1944.

== Soviet Lithuania ==
Niunka was a deputy chairman of the Council of Ministers of the Lithuanian SSR from January 1945 to November 1948. In April–November 1948, he was also Minister of Education. He moved on to become secretary of the Propaganda and Agitation Department of CPL until 1961. In this capacity, he chaired a commission on the translation and publication of collected works of Vladimir Lenin (35 volumes) and other fundamental works of Marxism–Leninism. He supported sovietization and suppression of the Lithuanian culture and the Catholic Church. He advocated to prohibit Lithuanian deportees from returning to Lithuania. At the same time, he was a deputy of the Supreme Soviet of the Soviet Union (1946–1962) as well as of the Supreme Soviet of the Lithuanian SSR (1947–1983) and was its chairman from 1955 to 1963 – de jure equivalent to the speaker. From June 1953 to February 1954, he was also the second secretary of CPL (for the second time).

In 1961, Niunka left the Politburo and the Propaganda and Agitation Department, but remained a member of the Central Committee of CPL. He devoted his time to the academic work. He taught as docent at Vilnius University (1946–1950 and 1961–1968) and edited theoretical journal Komunistas (1961–1970). In 1962, he became a corresponding member of the Lithuanian Academy of Sciences (admitted as true member in 1976). His research, published as six separate books in 1963–1980, centered on politics of the Catholic Church. In 1971, he defended his theses to become a Candidate of Sciences but did not complete all the requirements for the Doctor of Sciences. In total, Niunka published 11 books and about 400 articles during his lifetime.

He was awarded Order of Lenin (twice), Order of the October Revolution, Order of the Red Banner of Labour (twice), Order of the Patriotic War 2nd class, Order of the Badge of Honour.

Niunka died in Vilnius in 1983 and was buried in Antakalnis Cemetery.

== Bibliography ==
- Šarmaitis, Romas (1988). Lietuvos revoliucionieriai (PDF) (in Lithuanian). Mintis. ISBN 5-417-00071-X.
- Senn, Alfred Erich (2007). Lithuania 1940: Revolution from Above. On the Boundary of Two Worlds. Identity, Freedom, and Moral Imagination of the Baltics. Rodopi. ISBN 978-90-420-2225-6.
- Tininis, Vytautas (2000). Sniečkus. 33 metai valdžioje. Antano Sniečkaus biografinė apybraiža (in Lithuanian) (2nd ed.). Karminas. ISBN 9986-9231-4-X. Archived from the original on 2019-02-09.
- Tininis, Vytautas (2009-12-02). "Niùnka". Visuotinė lietuvių enciklopedija (in Lithuanian). Mokslo ir enciklopedijų leidybos centras.
