= Dimitravas forced labour camp =

Forced labor camp in Lithuania (1937–1944)

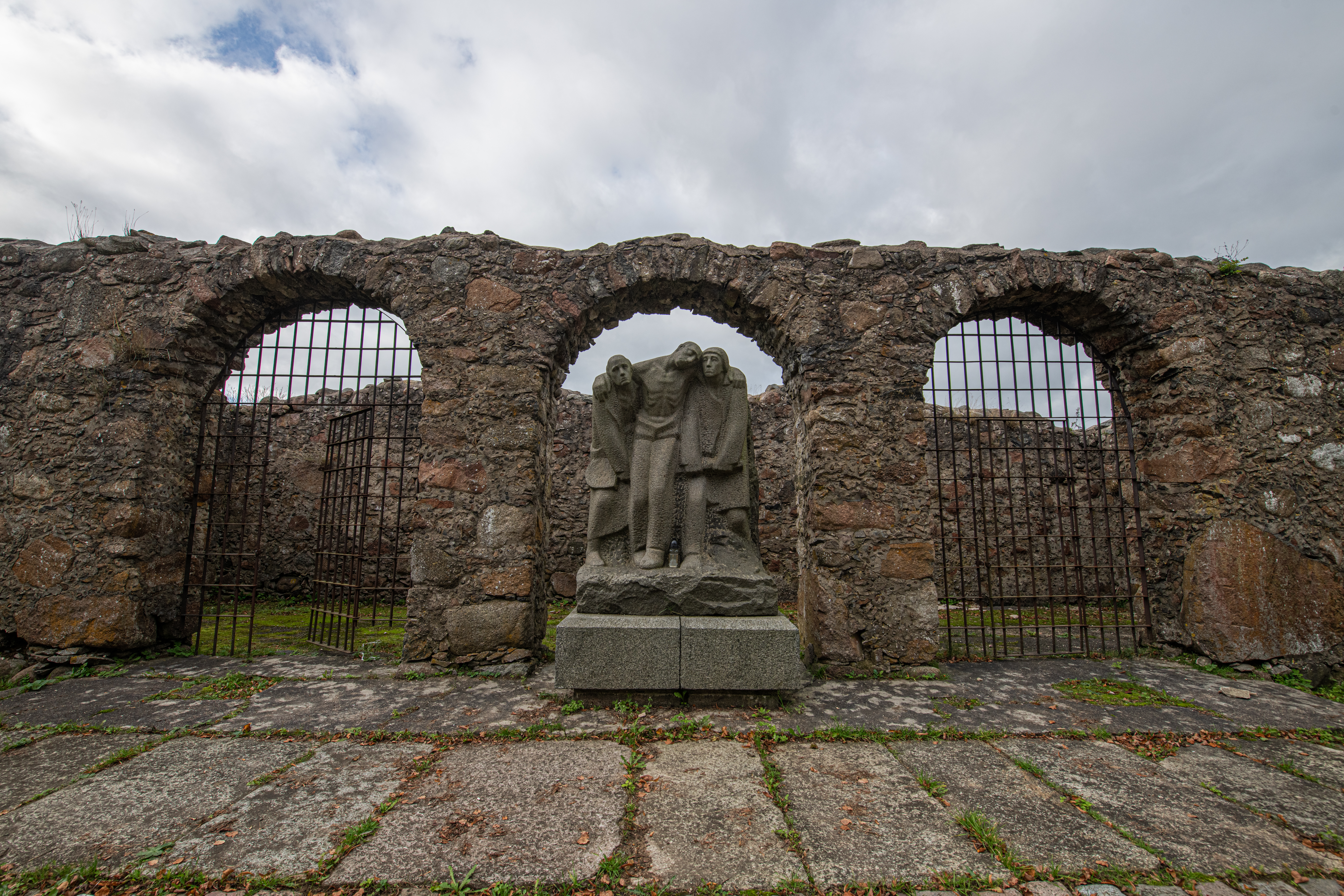
- Memorial sculpture at the site of the camp

- Location of the camp in Lithuania
- Location: Dimitravas, Lithuania; 55.968252°N 21.231542°E
- Status: Closed
- Security class: Forced labor camp
- Population: 209 (December 1939)
- Opened: August 1937
- Closed: October 1944

Dimitravas forced labour camp (Lithuanian: Dimitravo priverčiamojo darbo stovykla) was a forced labor camp established by the authoritarian regime of President Antanas Smetona in 1937 at the former estate of counts Zubov in the village of Dimitravas in the present-day Kretinga District Municipality, Lithuania. It was used to hold criminal and political prisoners who worked on breaking stones. Many prominent Lithuanian communist passed through the camp.

The camp was closed after the Soviet occupation of Lithuania in June 1940 but reopened when Lithuania was occupied by the Germans a year later. In July–August 1941, it held about 500 Jewish women and children from Skuodas who were executed in a nearby forest. Later it held mainly communist activists and farmers who were either unwilling or unable to pay the taxes or requisitions. According to Soviet sources, 1,770 prisoners were executed at the camp. In July 1944, prisoners organized a revolt and a mass escape, but the camp continued to operate until it was liberated by the Red Army in October 1944.

== Interwar Lithuania ==
Dmitry Zubov (1764–1835), major general in the Imperial Russian Army, established an estate for a folwark in 1829. The estate became known as Dimitravas in his honor. In 1874, the estate was purchased by the Tyszkiewicz family who owned the nearby Kretinga Manor. In 1899, the estate had 26 buildings. It was sold to the Lithuanian government in 1937.

The Lithuanian government established the Dimitravas forced labor camp based on the Law on Forced Labor Institutions adopted by the Fourth Seimas on 10 November 1936. It was a branch of Kaunas Prison. The camp opened in August 1937. The government sent criminal and political prisoners, primarily communists, to the camp when it lacked evidence for conviction. Since Lithuania was under martial law, the prisoners were sent to the camp without trial based on administrative orders by military commandants or county governors. The prisoners had to be between the ages of 17 and 60. The prisoners could be held for up to a year; bad behavior could earn additional six months. The prisoners were forced to work breaking stones which were transported via the nearby Bajorai–Priekule Railway for road construction. More artistic prisoners made memorial plaques and monuments.

At the beginning of 1938, the camp had 52 prisoners – 46 men (26 criminal and 20 political) and 6 women (political). The number of prisoners steadily grew. The camp held 91 prisoners in May 1938, 149 prisoners in September 1939, and 209 prisoners in December 1939. During 1939, a total of 337 people were sent to the camp. In total, it is estimated that about 500 people passed through the camp in interwar Lithuania. Prominent communists imprisoned at the camp included Justas Paleckis, Karolis Didžiulis, Icikas Meskupas-Adomas, Vladas Niunka, Motiejus Šumauskas, Boleslovas Baranauskas. In May 1940, several leaders of voldemarininkai were arrested and sent to the camp. The prisoners were allowed to read newspapers and listed to the radio.

The camp had the capacity of about 200 prisoners. As the number of prisoners increased, the government established a new forced labor camp in Pabradė in November 1939. Both camps were closed down after the Soviet occupation of Lithuania in June 1940. The barracks in Dimitravas were used to house Soviet soldiers.

== German occupation ==
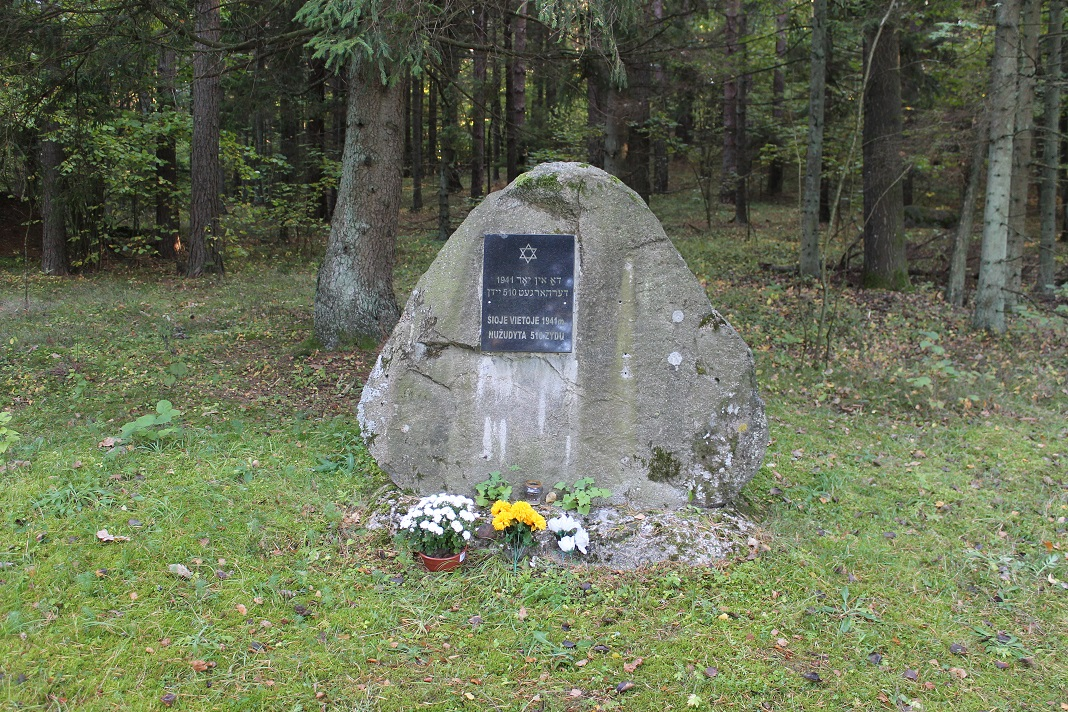
Memorial stone at the site of executions of Jewish women and children

When Lithuania was occupied by the Germans in June 1941, the camp was reestablished. At first, it was used to hold communists and Soviet activists from the Kretinga District.

In late July 1941, about 500 Jewish women and children from Skuodas were brought to the camp. They had to travel the distance of about 40 kilometres (25 mi) on foot in two days. On the way, people who could not keep up were executed. In 1963, 33 bodies were exhumed in five burials along the way. On 15 August 1941, older women and children were taken to a forest about 1.5 kilometres (0.93 mi) from the camp and shot by about 20 Lithuanian auxiliary policemen and four local volunteer residents. They were buried in mass graves. In December 1944, a Soviet commission exhumed four gravesites and counted 510 bodies – 385 women, 94 adolescents, and 31 children. The children had no bullet wounds and were buried alive. The site is marked by a memorial stone and was added to the Registry of Cultural Property in 1993.

About 40 young Jewish women were left in the camp. In September 1941, they were taken to Darbėnai and executed with other local Jews. After this, the camp held only political prisoners. In 1941, most prisoners were communists, including members of the Lithuanian Komsomol. During this period, future literary historian Jurgis Lebedys was briefly held at the camp. It later held farmers who were either unwilling or unable to pay the taxes or requisitions, people avoiding forced labor, profiteers, moonshiners, etc. The prisoners were forced to work in the forests, railway, or agricultural fields. In winter 1942, the prisoners worked on the construction of the railway depot in Kretinga, about 10 kilometres (6.2 mi) south of the camp.

As the Red Army pushed west and retook large areas of Lithuania, prisoners aided by about 10 or 12 guards (out of total 35 guards) organized a revolt and mass escape on 9 July 1944. They took weapons and burned prisoner case files. Out of several hundred prisoners, only two elderly men remained at the camp. Some of the escaped prisoners were recaptured and brought back to the camp. After the escape, the camp held about 60 to 100 prisoners guarded by the Ukrainian policemen. The prisoners worked digging trenches for the German Army. As the front approached, some prisoners were released while 40 prisoners (including five women) were sentenced to death on 8 October 1944. However, an attack by the Red Army disrupted the scheduled execution and the condemned prisoners were freed.

During the camp's operation, some prisoners were executed. For example, a group of prisoners was taken to Kretinga in August 1942. Five prisoners escaped during transport while the rest were executed outside of the town. In 1973, Soviet historians published a collections of documents about the mass murders in Lithuania. In it, without citing sources, they claimed that a total of 1,770 people were murdered at the camp between 1941 and 1944, not counting the 510 Jewish women and children.

== Camp description ==
According to a Soviet report from 1944, the camp was a square measuring about 800 metres (2,600 ft) on each side and surrounded by a 2-metre (6 ft 7 in) high barbed wire fence. The camp had six red watchtowers which locals nicknamed porcino. The prisoners were held in five buildings – three wooden barracks that measured 38 by 14 metres (125 by 46 ft) and could fit about 300 people each and two stone buildings with basements which housed cells for solitary confinement.

== Post-war ==
At the end of 1944, the Soviet government used the camp to train new recruits and sergeants. In 1949, the former estate became part of a local kolkhoz (collective farm).

In October 1964, a museum was opened at the former camp with methodological support from the Ninth Fort Museum and the Kaunas History Museum. It was a branch of the Kretinga Museum and covered a territory of 5.4 hectares (13 acres). A sculpture depicting three political prisoners by sculptor Antanas Dimžlys was installed by the ruins of the camp in 1974. The museum was closed in 1995. The former camp remains largely abandoned.

== Gallery ==
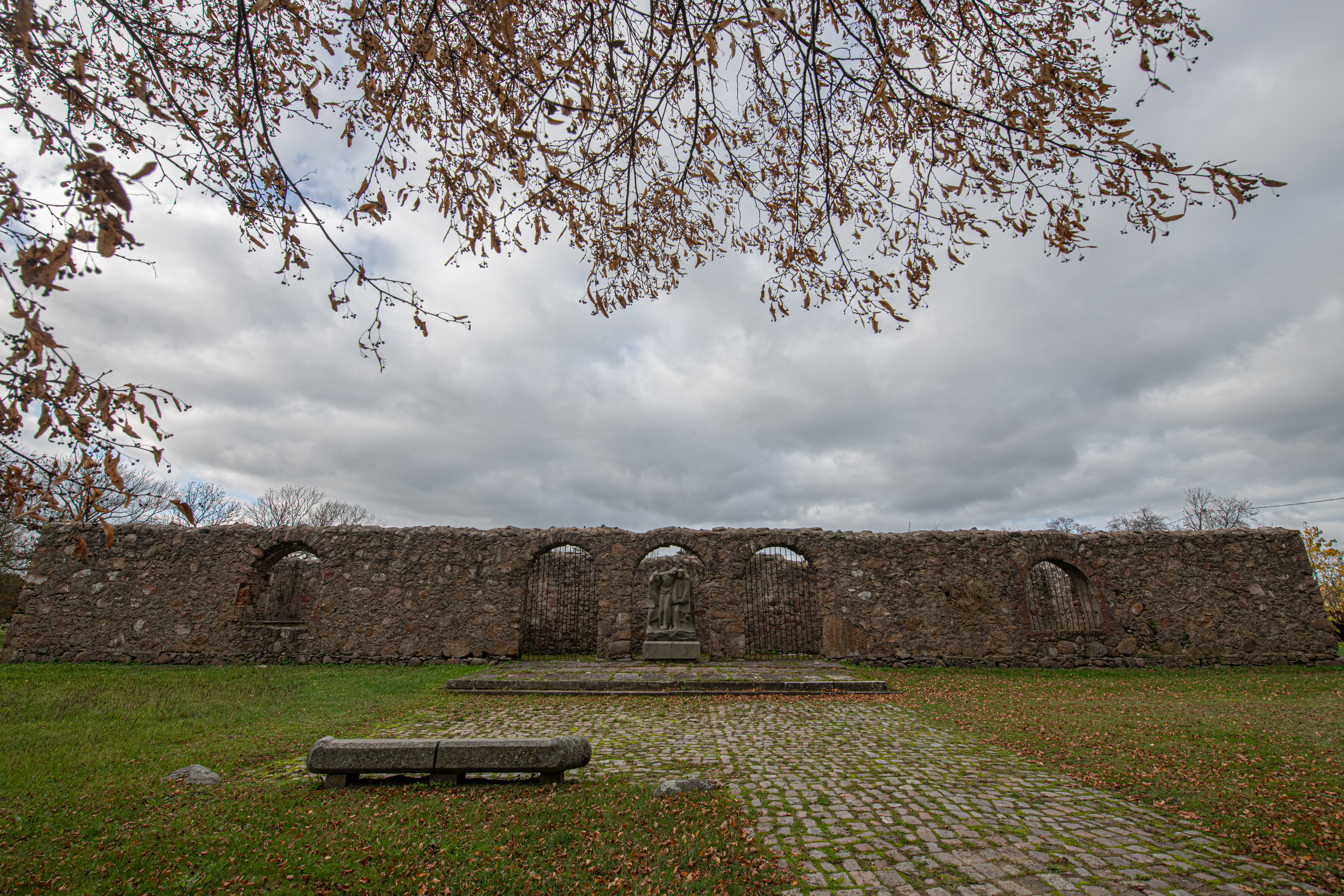
Stone path leading to the barrack was paved by the prisoners

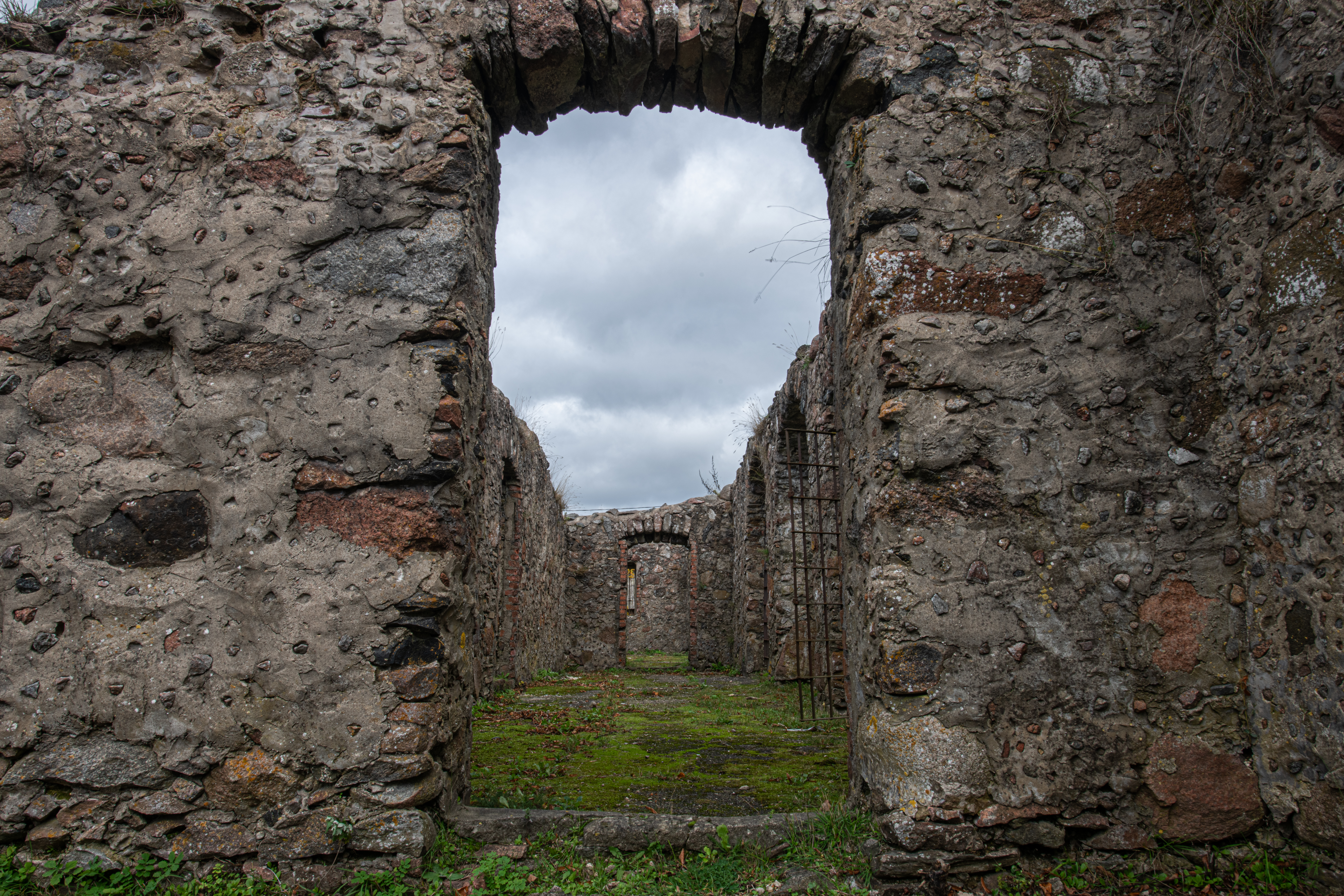
A look into the barrack

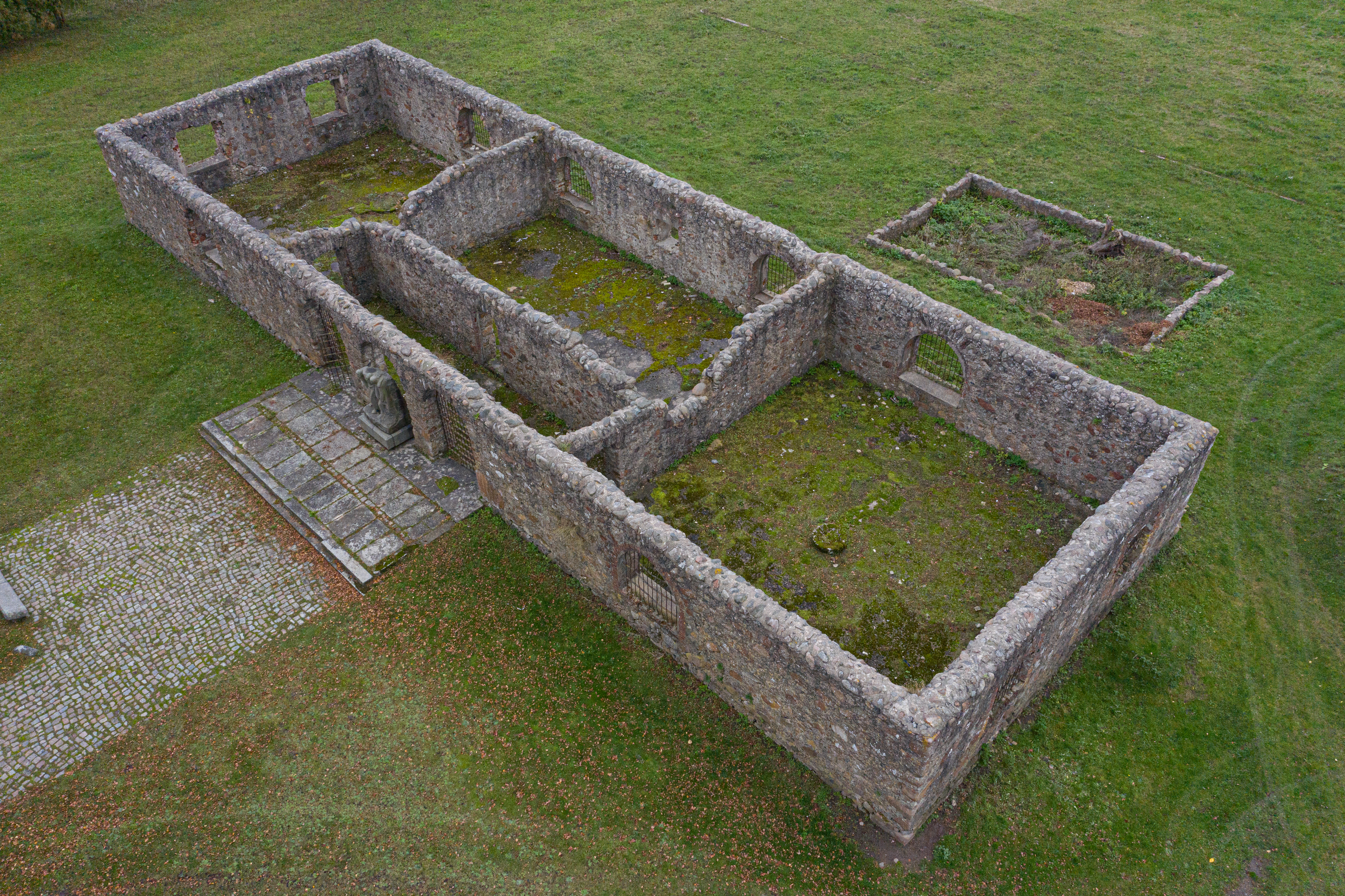
Aerial view of the ruins of one of the brick barracks

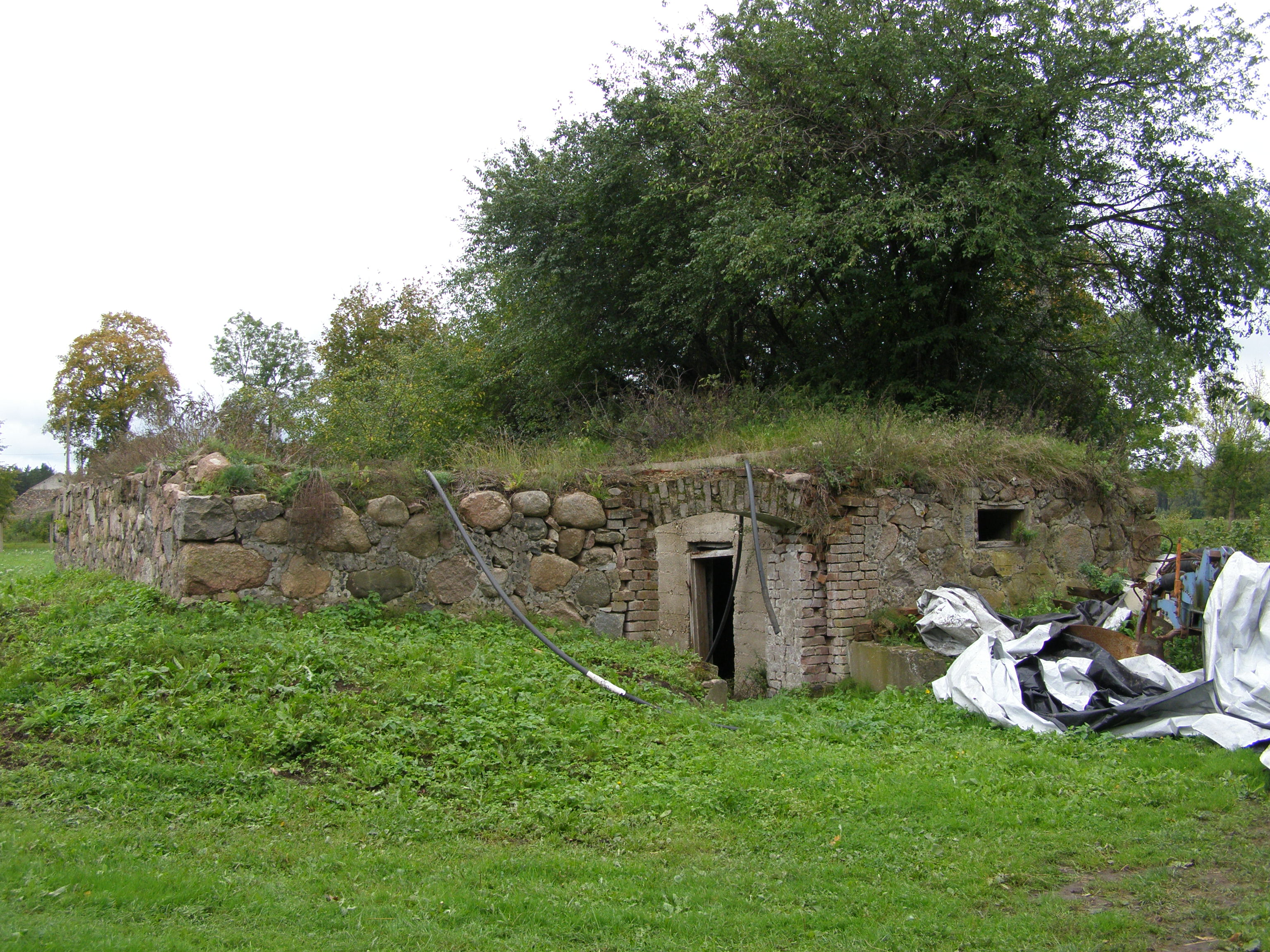
Remnants of solitary confinement cells

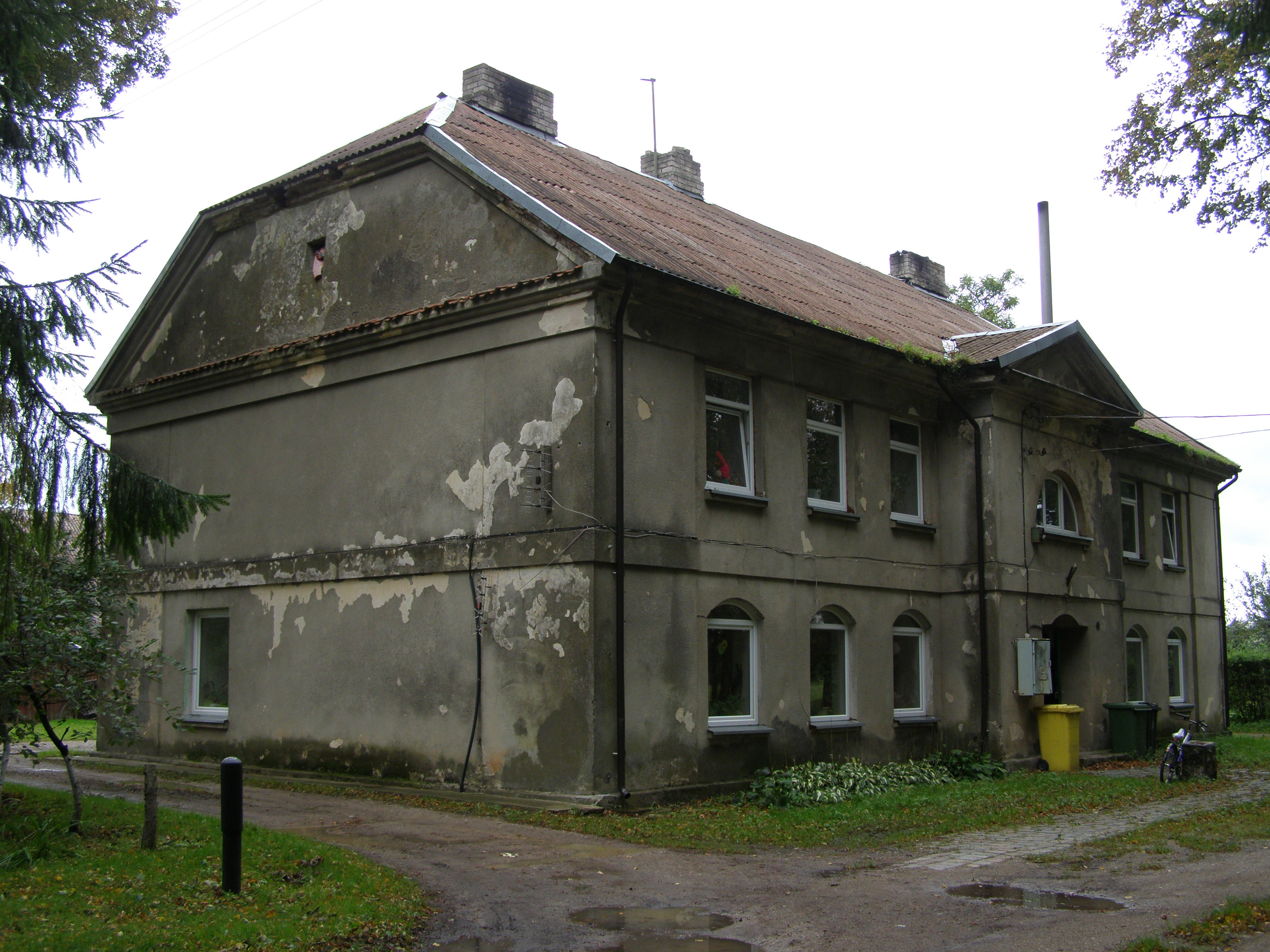
Administrative building of the camp (now a residential building)

== See also ==
- Varniai concentration camp
