= Gražiškiai =

- Town
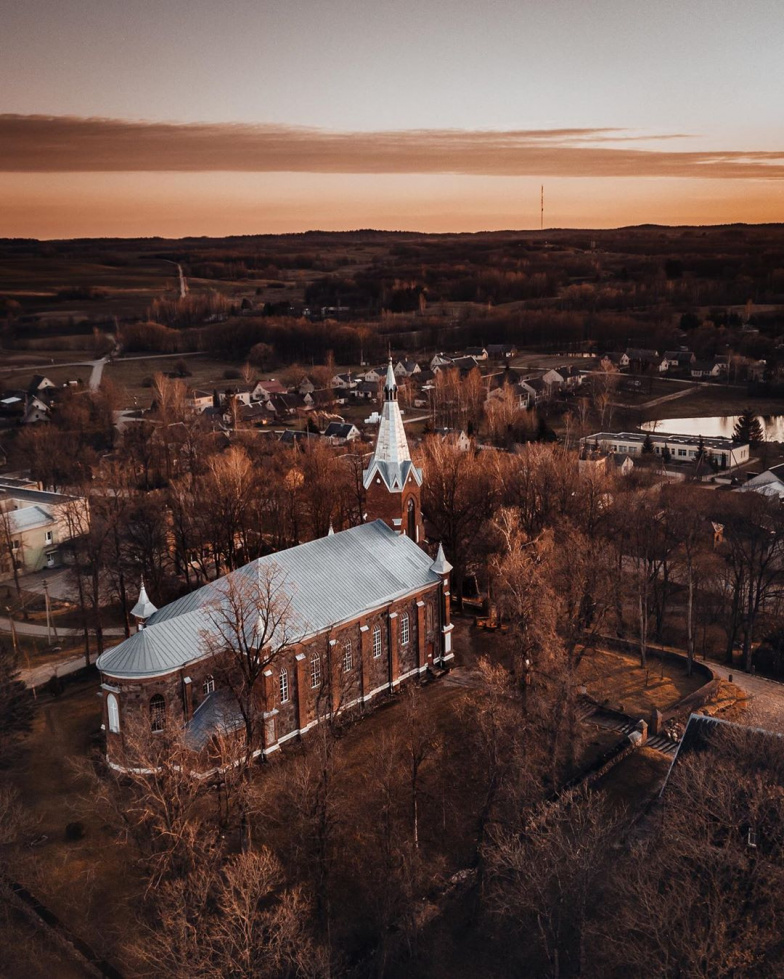
- Bird's-eye view of Gražiškiai

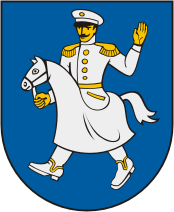
- Coat of arms

- Location within Lithuania
- Coordinates: 54°28′10″N 22°55′20″E
- Country: Lithuania
- County: Marijampolė County
- Municipality: Vilkaviškis District Municipality

Population (2011)
  - Total: 349
- Time zone: UTC+2 (EET)
  - Summer (DST): UTC+3 (EEST)

Gražiškiai is a small town in Marijampolė County, Vilkaviškis District Municipality. The town is located in southwestern Lithuania. According to the 2011 census, the town has a population of 349 people.

== Etymology ==
The name Gražiškiai is believed to have originated from the name of the nearby Grauža or Gražupis stream. In early written sources, the town was called Graža or Gražiai, and from the 17th century onwards, with the addition of a suffix, as Gražiškiai.

== Geography ==
Gražiškiai is located in south-western Lithuania, in the Sudovian Upland, in the south of Vilkaviskis District. The town is located 7.8 km north of the border with Poland and about 12 km east of the border with Kaliningrad Oblast. The Vištytis Regional Park is located 5 km south-west of Gražiškiai. In the surrounding area, there are lakes of Talaikė, Vygris, Beržinis, Armudiškės, and Dotamas.

== History ==
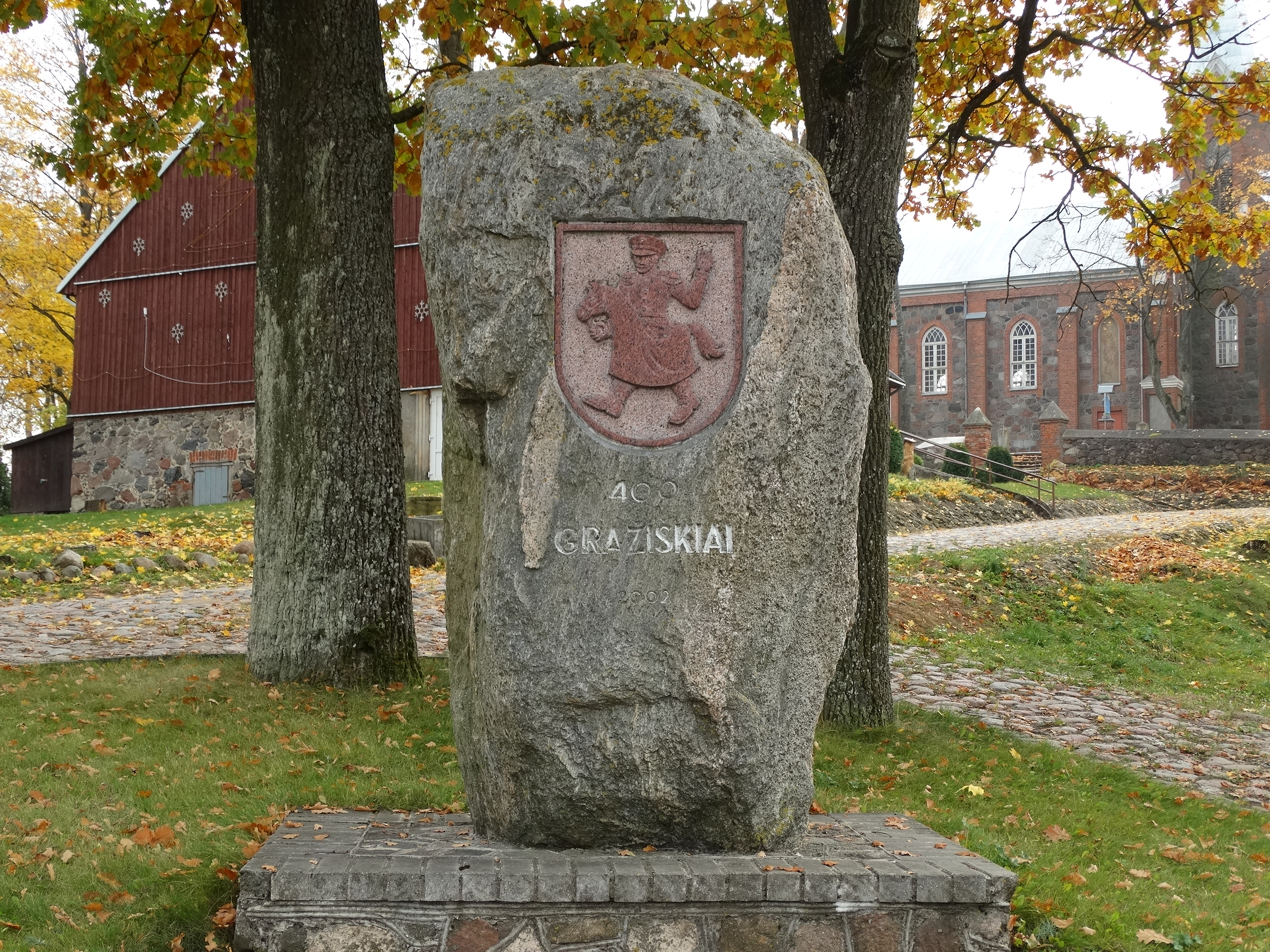
Monument with the coat of arms of Gražiškiai, unveiled in 2002

The town's origins can be traced back to the 16th century during the resettlement of Sudovia region after the lengthy Lithuanian Crusade, during which the region was largely abandoned. The newly established village consisted of a hill with surrounding land and was named Graža or Gražiai. In 1598, Jonas Naruševičius, the forester of Nemunaitis and supreme judge of the Lithuanian Tribunal, appointed Vaitiekus Gintautas as the first landlord of the village, and he founded the Gražiai manor. On the initiative of Gintautas, the first wooden church was built around 1600, for which Naruševičius allocated a tithe from all the inhabitants of the Nemunaitis area. In 1606, Gražiai manor had 16 valakas of land, 90 morgen of forest, and a watermill by the Dotamas River. In 1623 it is mentioned that there was a parish school near the church. The church decayed over time and was replaced by a new wooden church in 1745. In 1746, Gražiškiai was granted the market right of holding weekly markets and 4 annual markets. In 1781, the parish school was restored.

In the mid-19th century, in addition to the primary school, there was also a higher school, which trained scribes for the parish. In 1863, during the January Uprising, a group of rebels led by a peasant, G. Martinaitis, was active in the area around Gražiškiai. In 1877–1881, the present brick church of Gražiškių was built in the town. In 1925 a new wooden school was built, which was destroyed during the World War II and rebuilt in 1951.

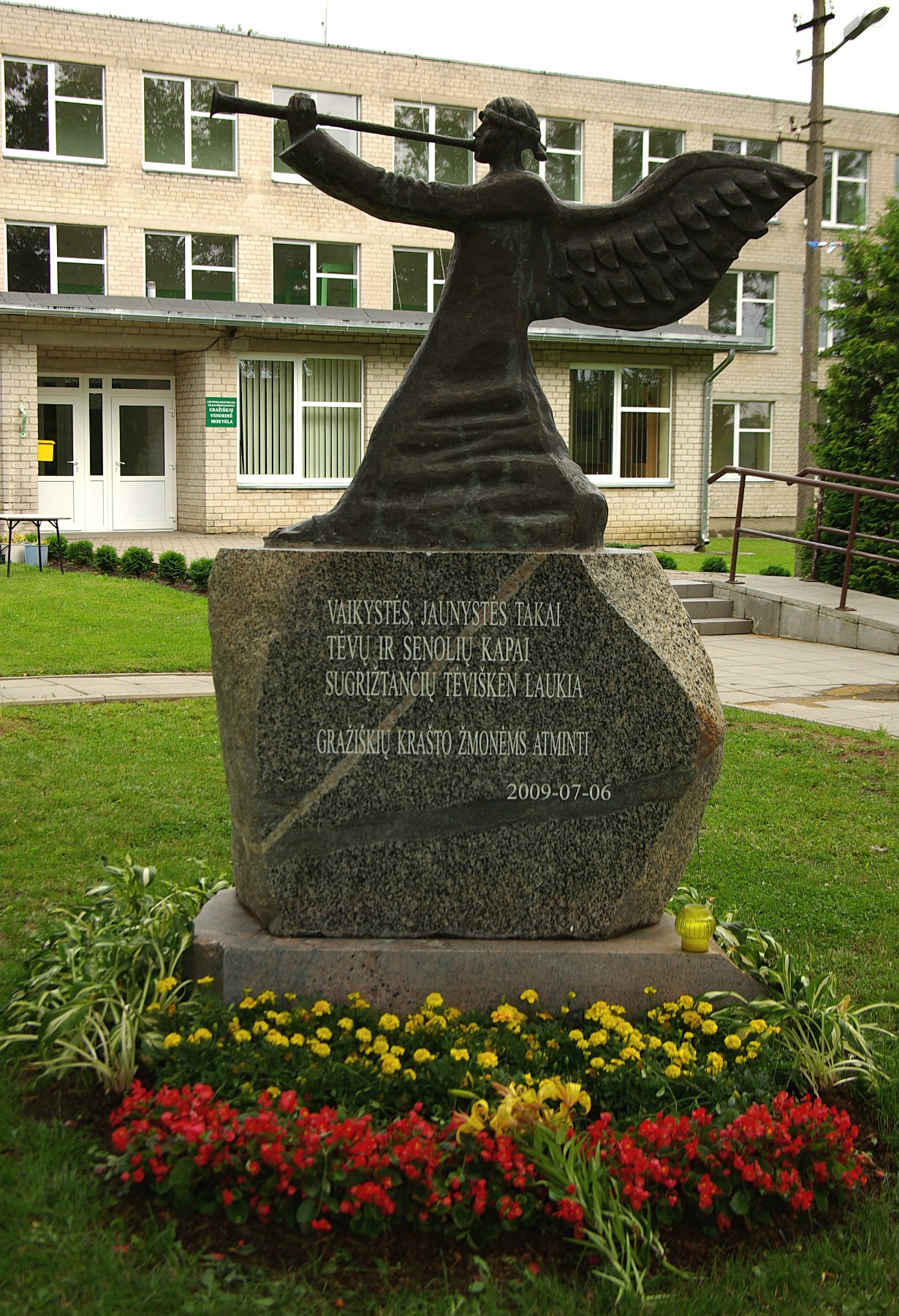
Monument of the Angel

The townspeople of Gražiškiai took part in the Russian Revolution of 1905, and in 1918 they supported the work of the State Council of Lithuania through a mass collective petition. In 1935, the residents of Gražiškiai took part in the Suvalkija farmers' strike.

After World War II, the Lithuanian partisans of the Vytautas Brigade of the Tauras military district were active in the area. In 1947 the first library was established, in 1959 a cultural house, post office and clinic were set up in the former clergy house. In 2001, the coat of arms of Gražiškiai was approved by the decree of the President of Lithuania. In July 2002, the town celebrated the 400th anniversary of its founding. In 2009, on the initiative of people from Gražiškiai, a Monument of the Angel inviting people to return to their homeland was unveiled.

== Culture ==
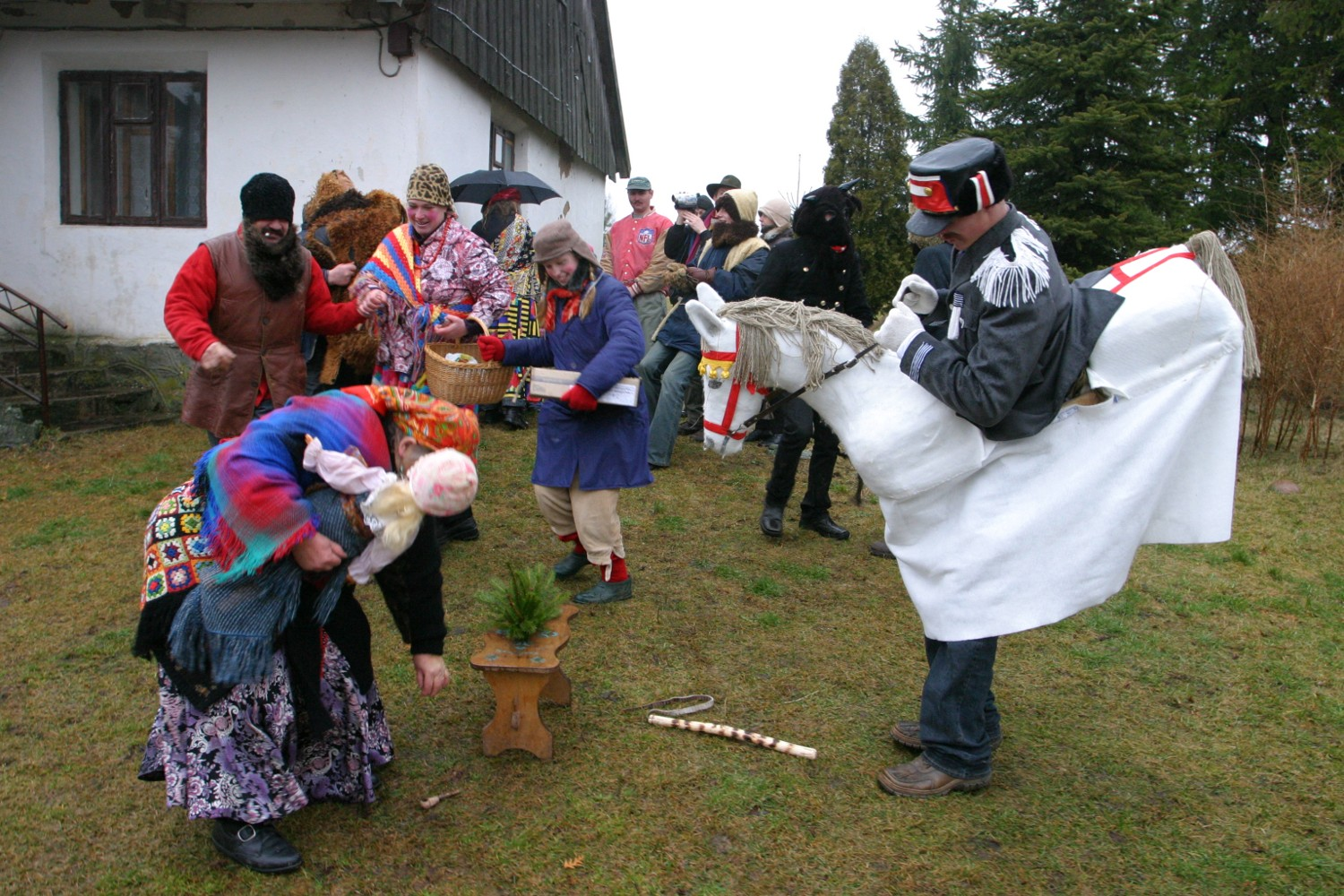
The celebrations of the Dance of Šyvis in 2004

The Dance of Šyvis (Lithuanian: Šyvio šokdinimas) is a celebration resembling a carnival of Užgavėnės, during which a group of masqueraders led by Šyvis (white horse) visits the homesteads of the town and surrounding villages to wish their hosts a good year. The tradition, which may have originated in Prussia, is celebrated only in Gražiškiai. The first mention of the Dance of Šyvis was in 18th-century written sources. In the past, this custom was practised in many villages in south-western Lithuania, but only in Gražiškiai has it survived to this day. The Dance of Šyvis is depicted in the town's coat of arms.
