= Supreme Court of the Lithuanian Soviet Socialist Republic =

Former high court in Lithuania

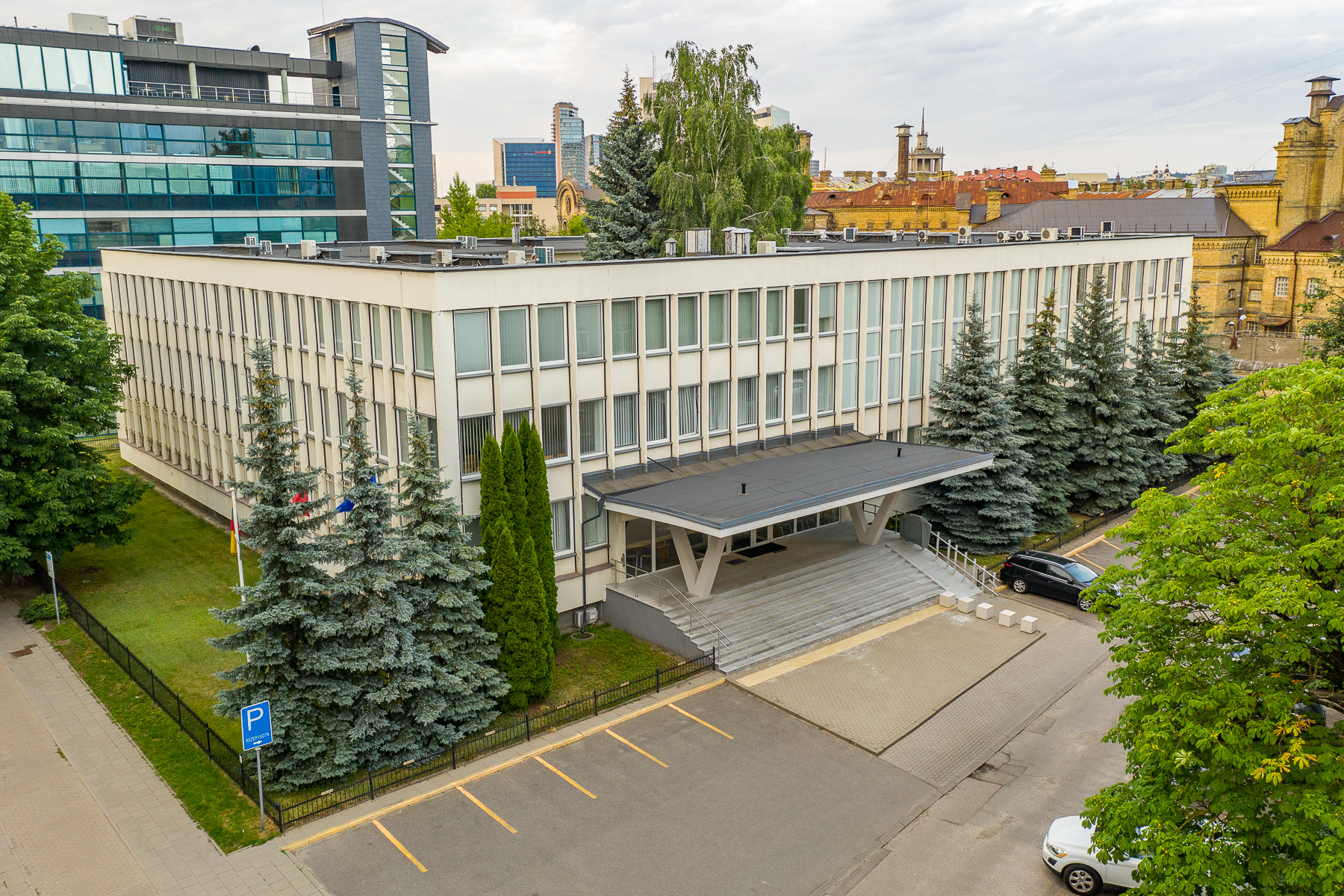
Building of the Supreme Court (build in 1965) next to Lukiškės Prison

The Supreme Court of the Lithuanian Soviet Socialist Republic (Lithuanian: Lietuvos SSR Aukščiausiasis Teismas) was the supreme judicial organ of the Lithuanian Soviet Socialist Republic. It replaced the Supreme Tribunal of Lithuania in 1940, and was replaced by the Supreme Court of Lithuania in 1990. For most of the Soviet period, there were only two levels of courts in Lithuania – the People's Courts and the Supreme Court.

== History ==
The Supreme Court was established shortly after the Soviet occupation of Lithuania in June 1940. The Supreme Soviet of the Lithuanian SSR adopted the new Soviet constitution on 25 August 1940 which authorized the Supreme Court. The Supreme Tribunal of Lithuania was officially liquidated on 26 September, and the Supreme Court was officially formed on 16 October 1940. During the German occupation (June 1941 to mid-1944), the Supreme Court did not function. It was reestablished in 1944. After Lithuania declared independence in March 1990, the court was reorganized into the Supreme Court of Lithuania.

== Functions ==
The Supreme Court consisted of judicial panels for civil and criminal cases. These panels reviewed cases from the People's Courts as the court of cassation and ruled on particularly important cases as the court of first instance. Another panel ruled on disciplinary matters related to judges.

The court also had a presidium and a plenum that examined cases as a judicial supervisor. Additional supervision was provided by the Supreme Court of the Soviet Union in limited cases (e.g. in cases where laws of the Lithuanian SSR conflicted with laws of the Soviet Union). In addition, the plenum examined judicial practice and provided binding guidance on the application of the laws to lower courts and other institutions. Judicial supervision was the main activity of the Supreme Court.

In 1970, Ministry of Justice was established. It took over some administrative duties from the Supreme Court such as court management, personnel selection, collection of statistics, supervision of notaries.

The Supreme Court of the Lithuanian SSR was part of the judicial system of the Soviet Union and had no real independence.

== Personnel ==
In 1940, the Supreme court had a chairman, two vice-chairmen, six members, and 16 people's councilors. In 1947, the court had 19 judges and 99 councilors. In 1953, the number of judges grew to 26. Formally, the judges were elected for five-year terms by the Supreme Soviet of the Lithuanian SSR. In reality, the judges were selected by the Central Committee of the Communist Party of Lithuania. Loyalty to the Communist Party was a key requirement for the judges. Thus, for example, in 1947, five judges had no judicial education.

== Chairmen ==
The court was chaired by:

- Jurgis Blieka (1940–1941, 1944–1947)
- Karolis Didžiulis (1947–1958)
- Albinas Likas (1959–1980)
- Jonas Misiūnas (1980–1990)
