= Butkų Juzė =

Lithuanian educator, poet, playwright and journalist

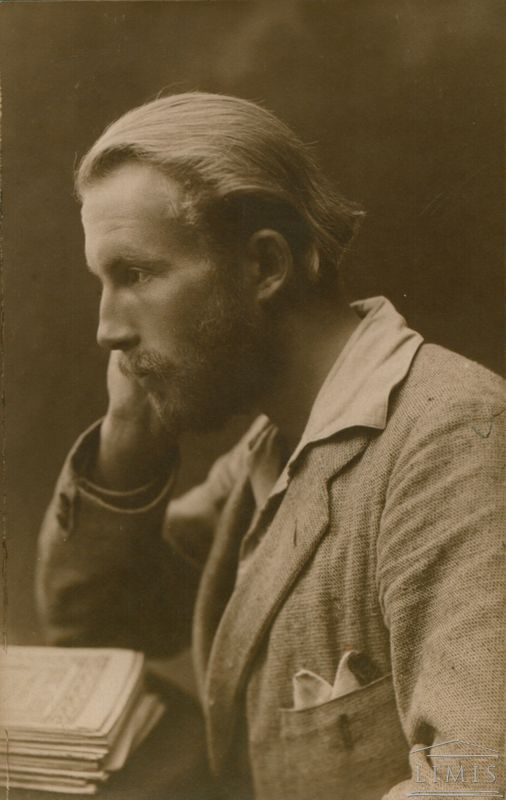
Butkų Juzė

Butkų Juzė (July 21, 1893 – April 22, 1947) was the pen name of Juozas Butkus, a Lithuanian educator, poet, playwright and journalist. He worked for numerous newspapers from 1910 onwards, including Aušrinė, Žemaitis, Lietuvos žinios, and Naujojoje Lietuvoje. In 1932 he was inducted into the Lithuanian Journalists' Union. He wrote the play Palaidūnas (Prodigal) in 1925, and translated numerous works into Lithuanian, including Goethe's Egmont. He later worked as a museum curator and teacher at the Klaipėda Pedagogical Institute.

Following the December 17, 1926 coup, he was arrested due to his pro-communist views and imprisoned for more than a year at the Varniai concentration camp. After his release in 1927, he worked at a Polish gymnasium in Ukmergė and as a teacher at a commercial school in Tauragė. In 1931, he co-edited the weekly newspaper Darbininkų balsas (Workers' Voice) with others.

From 1937 to 1940, Butkų Juzė served as the head of the Palanga State Public Library. In 1943, he became the director of the Samogitian Theater in Telšiai. From 1945 to 1947, he served as the director of the Alka Museum and also taught at the Klaipėda Teachers' Institute.

== Death and Burial ==
Butkų Juzė died on April 22, 1947, in Klaipėda but was buried in Telšiai.
