= Tiesa =

Official daily newspaper in the Lithuanian SSR

Tiesa (English: truth) was the official daily newspaper in the Lithuanian SSR. Established in 1917, the newspaper soon became the official voice of the Communist Party of Lithuania. After the Lithuanian victory in the Lithuanian–Soviet War, the party and the newspaper were outlawed in Lithuania. Thereafter, it was first printed in exile and later illegally in Kaunas. Tiesa survived irregular publishing schedules, frequent relocations, staff changes, and other difficulties and, after the Soviet occupation of Lithuania in June 1940, became the official daily of the new communist regime. At its peak, its circulation exceeded 300,000 copies. After the collapse of the Soviet Union, Tiesa lost its official status and its circulation shrank. The publication was discontinued in 1994.

== History ==
=== Early history ===
The first issue of Tiesa was published by the Lithuanian section of the Russian Social Democratic Labour Party (bolsheviks) in Petrograd on April 12, 1917. In October 1917, Tiesa became the official newspaper of the Lithuanian section. From April to December 1918, it was published in Moscow. By December 12, 1918, 91 issues of Tiesa were published.

In March–April 1919, five issues of the newspaper were published in Vilnius, the proclaimed capital of the short-lived Lithuanian–Belorussian Soviet Socialist Republic. It was the official newspaper of the Communist Party (Bolsheviks) of Lithuania and Belorussia. When Poland captured Vilnius during the Vilna offensive, Tiesa evacuated and was printed with interruptions in Raseiniai, Kaunas, Königsberg, Bellshill and Smolensk as the official newspaper of the Communist Party of Lithuania. In March 1926, it settled more permanently in Kaunas, the temporary capital of Lithuania. The communist party was outlawed in Lithuania, therefore Tiesa had to be printed illegally. There were 157 issues published in Kaunas.

Circulation of Tiesa
Year	Circulation
1917	3,000
1927	1,500
1941	40,000
1955	200,000
1970	258,000
1980	276,000
1987	311,000
1990	241,000
1994	50,000

=== Lithuanian SSR ===
After the Soviet occupation of Lithuania in June 1940, Tiesa was legalized and became a daily. It appeared first as Liaudies balsas (June 16–25) but soon recovered its historical name. It continued to be the official outlet of the Communist Party of Lithuania until the German invasion of the Soviet Union in June 1941. The newspaper was reestablished in Moscow in February 1942. There, 85 issues were published until July 1944. In August 1944, after the Soviet victory in Vilnius offensive, the newspaper relocated to Vilnius. Once again, it became a daily. From August 1945, in addition to being the official newspaper of the Communist Party of Lithuania, Tiesa was also the official voice of the communist government, specifically the Supreme Soviet of the Lithuanian SSR and the Council of Ministers of the Lithuanian SSR. It had permanent correspondents in Moscow and New York. In 1967, Tiesa received the Order of the Red Banner of Labour.

=== Independent Lithuania ===
After the first free parliamentary elections in February 1990, Lithuania declared independence from the Soviet Union. Lietuvos aidas became the official newspaper of the Supreme Council – Reconstituent Seimas. The Communist Party of Lithuania reorganized itself into the Democratic Labour Party of Lithuania (LDDP). Tiesa followed suit and became the newspaper of the LDDP. In 1992, Tiesa became a privately owned publication. On July 1, 1994, it was discontinued and replaced by daily Diena (English: day). The last issue of Diena was published in 1996.

== Content ==
Tiesa was dedicated to communist ideology. It advocated socialist revolution and criticized other political parties. It reported on the activities of the Communist Party of Lithuania and its organizations, and published their programs, resolutions, statements and manifestos. Tiesa also reported on world and Lithuanian news, analysing stories through a communist point of view. The newspaper also published stories on the life of workers, peasants and soldiers. Occasionally it also published fiction, mostly poems.

== Editors ==
The editors-in-chief were:

- April 1917: Vladas Požela
- April 1917 – February 1918: Zigmas Angarietis
- March 1918 – April 1919: Vincas Mickevičius-Kapsukas
- September 1919 – August 1922: Karolis Požėla
- July 1924 – January 1926: Zigmas Angarietis
- February–November 1926: Karolis Požėla
- January 1927 – May 1929: Antanas Sniečkus
- August 1930: Ignas Gaška
- January–July 1934: Aizikas Lifšicas
- August 1934 – July 1935: Icikas Meskupas-Adomas
- November 1935 – April 1936: Juozas Garelis
- September 1936 – November 1939: Antanas Sniečkus
- January–March 1940: Antanas Petrauskas
- June 1940: Vladas Niunka
- July 1940 – April 1942: Genrikas Zimanas
- May–December 1942: Jonas Šimkus
- January 1943 – July 1944: Vladas Niunka
- August 1944 – September 1945: Romas Šarmaitis
- October 1945 – December 1970: Genrikas Zimanas
- January 1971 – 1987: Albertas Laurinčiukas
- 1987–1990: Mindaugas Barysas
- 1990– June 1994: Domas Šniukas
