= Varniai concentration camp =

Political internment camp in Lithuania

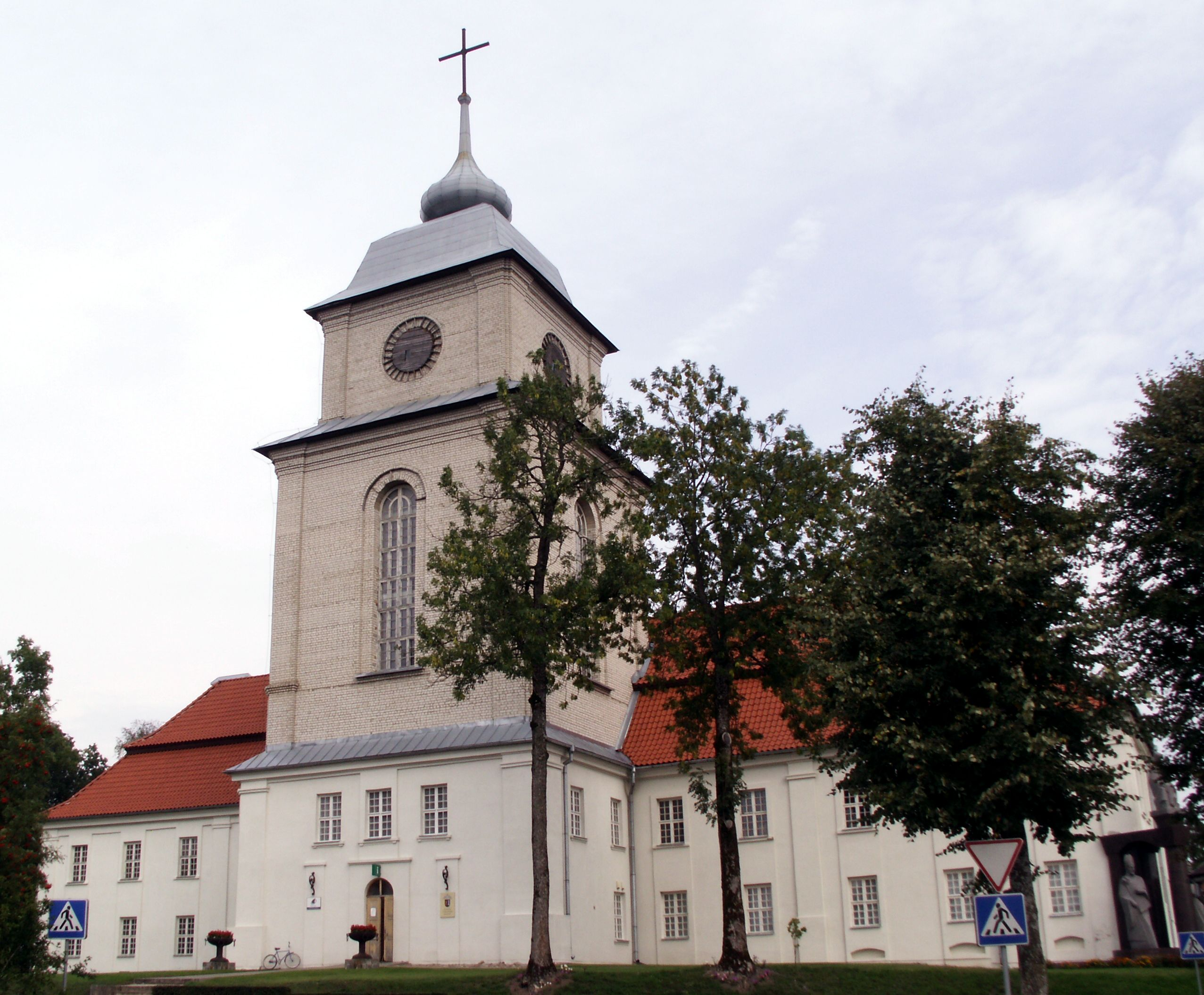
- Main building of the concentration camp (present-day Samogitian Diocese Museum)

- Location of the Varniai concentration camp
- Location: Varniai, Lithuania; 55°44′38″N 22°22′21″E
- Status: Closed
- Security class: Internment camp
- Capacity: 300
- Population: 168 (October 1928)
- Opened: 19 January 1927
- Closed: 30 October 1931
- Warden: Captain Kostas Rudaitis

Notable prisoners
- Butkų Juzė, Vladas Niunka, Mečislovas Gedvilas, Andrius Bulota

Varniai concentration camp was an internment camp in Varniai, Lithuania. It was created a month after the coup d'état of December 1926 to house political prisoners, mostly members of the outlawed Communist Party of Lithuania. In total, more than 1,000 people passed through the camp before it was closed in 1931 due to financial difficulties brought by the Great Depression. Later, the authoritarian regime of Antanas Smetona operated two other internment camps, one in Dimitravas in 1936 and another in Pabradė in 1939.

== History ==
In December 1926, Lithuanian military organized a coup to overthrow the democratically elected Lithuanian government of President Kazys Grinius and install Antanas Smetona and his Lithuanian Nationalist Union. The official rationale given by the military was that their actions had prevented an imminent Bolshevik coup, allegedly scheduled for 20 December. About 350 communists were arrested and four leaders (Karolis Požela, Juozas Greifenbergeris, Kazys Giedrys and Rapolas Čarnas) were executed on 29 December. The new government decided to establish a concentration camp and selected the building of the former Varniai Priest Seminary which was turned into military barracks after the Uprising of 1863.

By mid-February 1927, the number of inmates reached 136. The camp could accommodate about 300 people, but only rarely the population exceeded 150. At the end of 1927, the population peaked at 187. The people, including women and a few children, would be sent to the camp by an administrative order of a military commandant when the authorities lacked evidence for a criminal conviction. The internment was usually for 1–3 months or until the end of the martial law (i.e. unlimited).

In 1931, on average, there were 48 internees at the camp. The camp was officially closed on 30 October 1931 due to financial difficulties brought by the Great Depression. The building was returned to the military. In total, more than 1,000 people passed through the camp.

== Internees ==
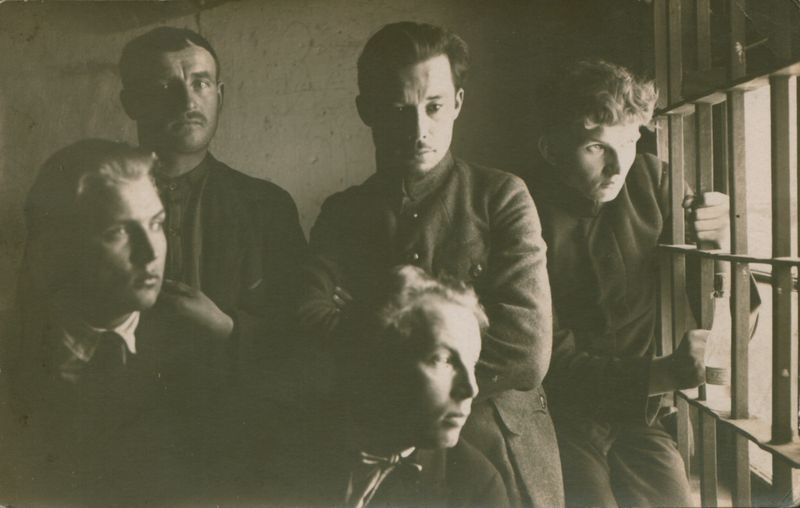
Internees at the camp in 1927 (including Butkų Juzė)

The first three internees arrived on 19 January 1927. They were editor of Tautos valia major Juozas Tomkus, former chairman of the Lithuanian Riflemen reserve captain Pranas Klimaitis, and M. Marcinkevičius. Tomkus and Klimaitis were accused of organizing a coup on 14–15 January but were released within a few days. Notable inmates included writer Butkų Juzė, communists Vladas Niunka, Mečislovas Gedvilas, socialist attorney Andrius Bulota, former Minister of Finance Petras Karvelis. The cells were large and could house some 30 people. The communists used this to establish self-education groups to improve their knowledge and understanding of Marxism–Leninism.

== Polish–Lithuanian dispute ==
A letter allegedly written by 28 Polish teachers imprisoned in Varniai was published by Polish press on 4 October 1927. The letter claimed that the teachers were imprisoned because they refused to teach history according to the government-approved syllabus. This was a very sensitive issue due to the bitter Polish–Lithuanian dispute over the Vilnius Region. After the coup d'état of December 1926, Lithuania started a campaign against Polish primary schools. Many schools were closed after 12 Polish teachers were arrested right after the coup while others lost their jobs under the pretext of insufficient knowledge of the Lithuanian language or lack of qualifications.

The letter was likely a forgery by the Polish government in response to Lithuanian plans of adopting a new constitution that would explicitly name Vilnius (Polish: Wilno) as the capital of Lithuania. The letter could also a forgery by Lithuanian political émigrés, internal opposition, or German government, which just now was starting the campaign to regain the Klaipėda Region (Memel territory). The Polish government used the letter as a pretext to close dozens of Lithuanian schools (including 44 schools maintained by the Lithuanian Education Society Rytas) and arrest 25 Lithuanian teachers and activists. Lithuanian Prime Minister Augustinas Voldemaras sent a formal complaint to the League of Nations which debated the question during its December session.
