= Vaivadiškiai =

- Village
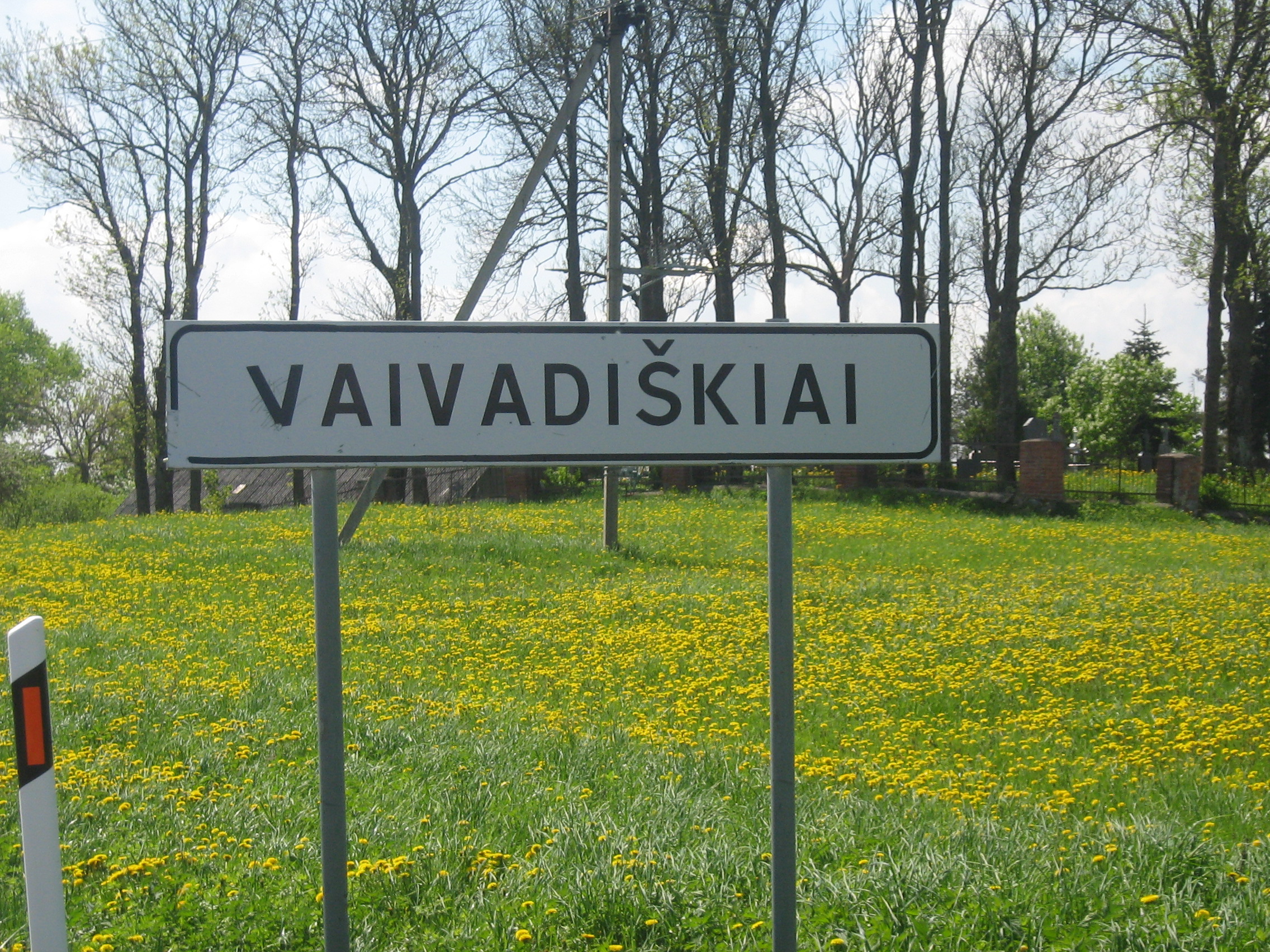

- Location in Lithuania
- Coordinates: 55°08′50″N 24°16′30″E
- Country: Lithuania
- County: Kaunas County
- Municipality: Jonava

Population (2011)
  - Total: 167
- Time zone: UTC+2 (EET)
  - Summer (DST): UTC+3 (EEST)

Vaivadiškiai is a village in the Jonava district municipality, in Kaunas County, in central Lithuania. According to the 2011 census, the village has a population of 167 people.
