= Statesmen (conspiracy theory) =

Lithuanian political conspiracy theory

The Statesmen, or Statesmen Clan (Lithuanian: "valstybininkai", "valstybininkų" klanas, generally written with quote marks) is a conspiracy theory which claims that a deep state of unelected officials, based in the Ministry of Foreign Affairs and the State Security Department of Lithuania (VSD), seeks to influence the actions of elected officials, protect each other in power and take control of Lithuania. The conspiracy theory emerged in 2006, after the death of VSD officer Vytautas Pociūnas in Belarus, who the theory claims was a whistleblower of the clan's activities. The conspiracy theory was promoted by politicians in the Homeland Union (TS-LKD).

Though primarily connected with investigations from 2006 to 2010, the theory has experienced a revival since 2019, after opponents of the Homeland Union claimed that the "clan" remains active and is pressuring the Šimonytė Cabinet.

== Content ==
Yes, such a clan exists. They never participate in elections, but they always win. However, this clan doesn't have a clear structure and is often united only by the interests of the time. I will quote the thoughts expressed by one "statesman" during a private conversation: "If politicians are failures and do not try to keep political power in their hands, it is natural that someone will take it anyway. The state cannot be ungoverned. That's why we do it, because we know what to do with government power."
— Artūras Zuokas

According to Valdas Vasiliauskas, editor-in-chief of Lietuvos žinios (later a Member of the Seimas for the Way of Courage party), the Statesmen are "a clan-like group of persons connected by constant mutual relations, distribution of roles and tasks among group members", it is a highly organized and hierarchical organization (Vasiliauskas identified Albinas Januška as its leader), has control of the Ministry of Foreign Affairs, the State Security Department, the President of Lithuania, the military, police, the political sciences faculty of Vilnius University and is connected with the courts, political parties and the media.

Pociūnas was generally described as a whistleblower, a VSD official who was aware of the conspiracy and was killed for attempting to reveal it to the media. The specific information differed. In 2008, Vasiliauskas claimed that Pociūnas investigated the connections between the "Statesmen" and the energy company Dujotekana, as well as the company's influence in government institutions. Later, in 2014, he claimed that Pociūnas was aware about the CIA black site in Antaviliai, near Vilnius, and the alleged bribes to VSD officials which allowed its creation.

It had been alleged that the "Statesmen" were responsible for the fall of Brazauskas Cabinet II and convinced members of the Labour Party to support the formation of the Kirkilas Cabinet. Viktor Uspaskich accused "statesmen" of attempting to destroy his political career and his party via Labour's "dark accounting" case. Rolandas Paksas, President of Lithuania impeached in 2004, claimed that he opposed the "statesmen" during his presidency and was removed for refusing to allow the establishment of the Antaviliai CIA black site. In 2007, he claimed that "statesmen" conspired to raise attention towards LGBT rights in Lithuania to distract attention from their case.

According to Rasa Juknevičienė, Member of the Seimas from the Homeland Union, the deep state emerged after the 1998 Russian financial crisis and the 2000 Lithuanian parliamentary election, which spurned a group of individuals to "take the reins of the state to their hands" with Russian financial support. Vasiliauskas claimed that the conspiracy formed as early as 1990, within the deputies of the Supreme Council of Lithuania, also known as the Reconstituent Seimas, including members of the former Communist Party of Lithuania. Antanas Valionis claimed that "TS-LKD campaign against the so-called Statesmen" could have been motivated by the struggles of business groups in the energy sector in 2000–2006 and VSD investigations into previous unexplained violent acts, such as the Bražuolė bridge bombing in 1994 and the bombing of the editorial office of Lietuvos rytas in 1995. According to the politician, the TS-LKD interpreted this as a conspiracy against them.

== History ==
=== Death of Vytautas Pociūnas ===
Though the pejorative term "valstybininkas" ("Statesman", meaning an official who belongs to a group of influential figures seeking personal gain) has been used in Lithuanian media since at least 2005, the conspiracy theory emerged after Vytautas Pociūnas, a VSD officer stationed in Brest, Belarus, was found dead after falling out of the window of Hotel Intourist on 23 August 2006. The death was ruled an accident, but it was rumoured that Pociūnas was killed for his alleged investigations into a deep state within the Lithuanian government and institutions, and their anti-state activities. It became more prominent after an investigation into Pociūnas' death by the State Prosecutor's Office was closed in late 2006 after a very quick investigation (including a claim that Pociūnas fell out of a window while urinating, which was interpreted as a smear campaign), and after an Ekstra magazine interview of VSD deputy director Darius Jurgelevičius in September 2006, in which he commented on the public interest in the Pociūnas case:

There are many nuances and details. And if all this rummaging around in those bones continues, moments that will not add honor to the whole thing will start to emerge. I think someone is trying to make a big show, but the result, I believe, will be disappointing. Unfortunate.

Numerous protests were held in support of Pociūnas and his surviving family, and the final annual commemoration of his death was held in 2016. The death was also followed by an investigation by the Seimas National Security and Defense Committee (Lithuanian: Lietuvos Respublikos Seimo nacionalinio saugumo ir gynybos komitetas, NSGK) into VSD activity, initiated by Homeland Union Member of the Seimas Rasa Juknevičienė.

=== 2006 Seimas investigation ===
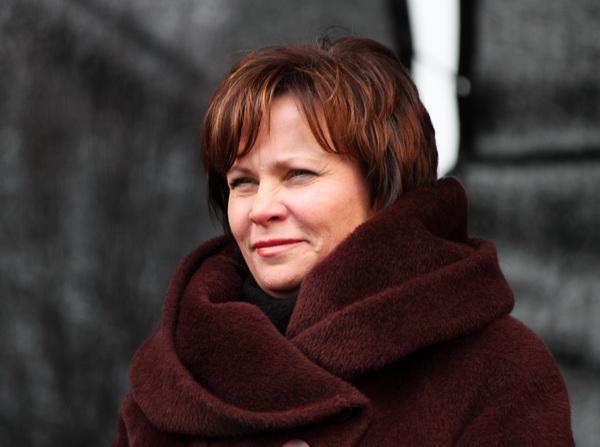
Member of the NSGK, Rasa Juknevičienė was one of the first Seimas members to demand a parliamentary investigation into VSD activities, which fuelled the conspiracy theory.

On 4 December 2006, NSGK published their conclusion on the activities of the State Security Department. 33 active (in December 2006) and 4 former VSD officials, Seimas members Andrius Kubilius, Jurgis Razma, Antanas Valionis, former secretary of the Ministry of Foreign Affairs Albinas Januška, former Director General of VSD, ambassador to Spain Mečys Laurinkus, consul general in Grodno Daiva Mockuvienė, television journalist Joana Lapėnienė, Vytautas Pociūnas's wife Liudvika Pociūnienė and brother Algimantas Pociūnas, and signatory of the Act of March 11 Algirdas Endriukaitis testified before the committee.

The investigation was controversial. Januška resigned from the Ministry of Foreign Affairs, claiming that he is unable to answer public criticism while keeping state secrets, but was immediately reappointed as advisor to Gediminas Kirkilas. NSGK members unsuccessfully demanded certificates from the VSD related to possible corrupt connections of high-ranking officials. Refused, the politicians turned to President Valdas Adamkus hoping to convince him to temporarily suspend the then head of the VSD, Arvydas Pocius, whose decision not to provide information was assessed as a mockery of the Seimas. However, the president refused to meet with members of the Seimas. During the investigation, independent journalists published information regarding the suspects' alleged membership in the KGB and connections with the Russian state energy company Gazprom.

In the committee's opinion, Pociūnas was removed from his previous duties within the VSD and assigned to Belarus in order to stop corruption investigations he was conducting in the transport and energy sectors. In addition, the committee stated that

certain signs identified during the parliamentary investigation allow to assume that some VSD investigations, actions of directors and officials in some cases may have been carried out or their results used for the benefit of certain political groups, in other cases - to influence these political groups or politicians themselves.

The committee's opinion statement first coined the term "statesman" to refer to individuals allegedly involved, to Albinas Januška, without a negative connotation.

The term "statesmen" was originally claimed by the accused politicians and civil servants themselves, to express their patriotism. Mečys Laurinkus commented on the existence of a group which "formulated tasks" for the State Security Department on 30 October 2007:

In many democratic states, there is a mechanism for forming tasks for the intelligence service and even reviewing them annually. These are special groups of politicians in the government or presidency. There is no such mechanism in Lithuania, the VSD works according to the Law on the Fundamentals of National Security, like a radar signaling an impending threat. It is effective, but very expensive, and it also duplicates the work of other services. Several influential Lithuanian politicians, who are quite rightly called by the honorable name of "statesmen", took the initiative of formulating tasks. Unusual, new, but very necessary work has received distorted evaluations from both inside and outside the institution.

This was taken by various politicians in the country to be a confirmation of the existence of the conspiracy, and Member of the Seimas Algimantas Matulevičius (Civic Democracy Party), in charge of a parliamentary investigation into VSD activity, described it as an unconstitutional act. Laurinkus later claimed that he does not remember the existence of such a scandal.

=== Renewed criminal investigation ===
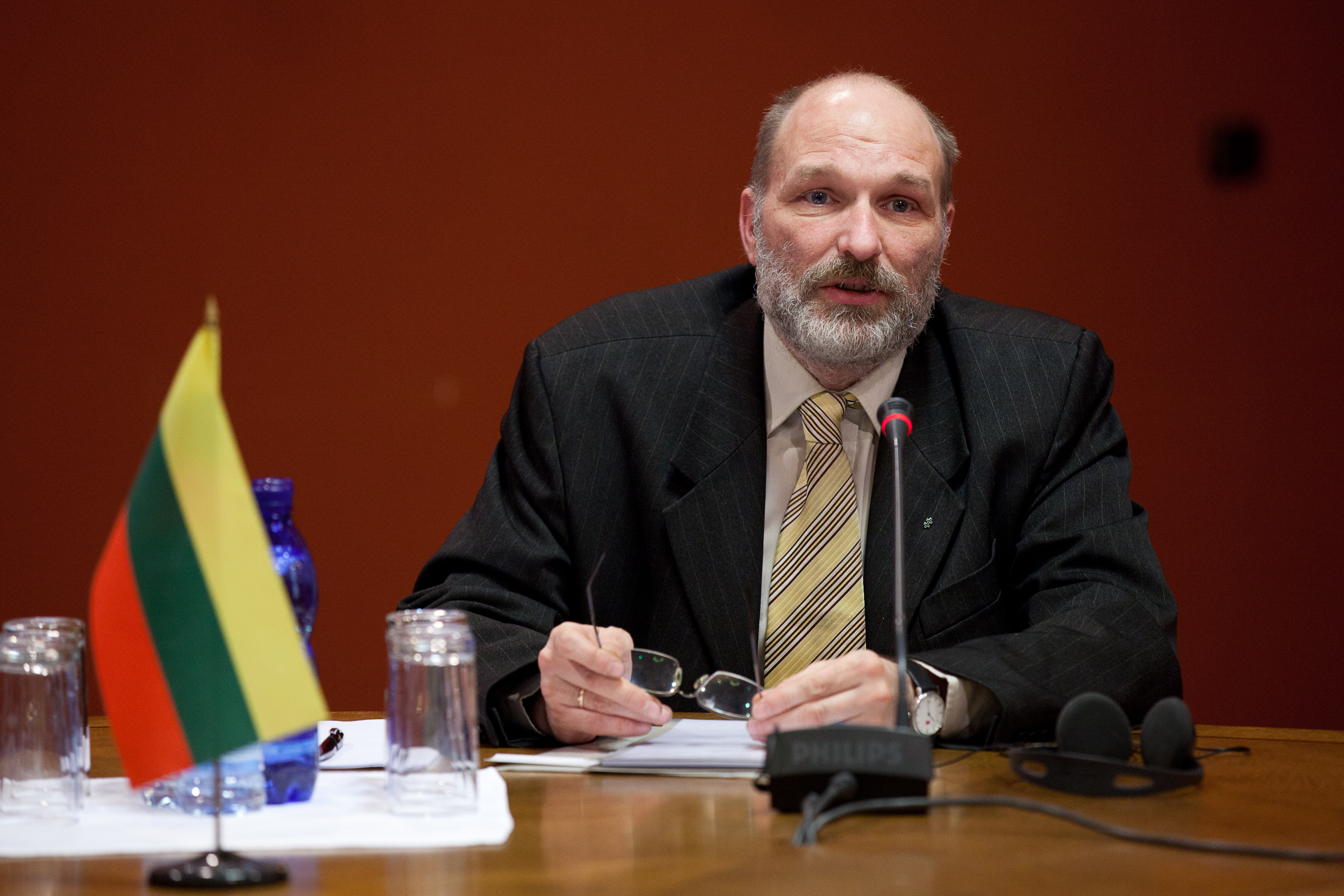
Pečeliūnas in 2011

Vytautas Pociūnas' widow, Liudvika Pociūnienė, requested the reopening of the terminated investigation in November 2006, claiming that it lacked detail and was not impartial. She was joined by Member of the Seimas Saulius Pečeliūnas (TS-LKD), who formed a nonpartisan civil society organization, Rally of Citizens (Lithuanian: Piliečių santalka), claiming to combat perceived cliques in the government and a "nomenklatura more powerful than the law". Both complaints were dismissed by the General Prosecutor's Office in July 2007 on lacking grounds.

Pociūnienė received support throughout the political spectrum. Vytautas Landsbergis, former leader of the Homeland Union, asserted that the conclusions of the prosecutor's office that Pociūnas died in an accident were "worthless", and the New Union (Social Liberals) lodged a demand that the General Prosecutor's Office should make the materials of the investigation file public. On 17 August 2007, Prime Minister Gediminas Kirkilas announced the formation of a special work committee which would investigate the circumstances of Pociūnas' death, led by publicist Vytautas Ališauskas and staffed by Seimas and European Parliament members from several political parties. New forensic and medical experts were hired after Pociūnas' widow and the press criticized the negligence of the forensic experts during the initial investigation.

The renewed investigation was slow and controversial. It was criticized by President Valdas Adamkus as a threat to the independence of the prosecution system. The committee could only meet in 2008 due to conflicting schedules of the committee members (including two EP members, who worked in Brussels and could only participate on Fridays), and several of the committee's members resigned before the first meeting due to this inactivity. Meanwhile, at the order of court, the General Prosecutor's Office renewed investigation into the case, which doubled the work of the committee. It was shut down in March 2008. An independent investigation commission was organized by Sąjūdis in July 2008. Vygaudas Ušackas alleged that asking for Landsbergis's support to be selected as Minister of Foreign Affairs in October 2008, he was requested to "eliminate the Statesmen element administered by Albinas Januška".

On 24 February 2009, the case was closed again and the General Prosecutor's Office reaffirmed that Pociūnas' death was an accident. Liudvika Pociūnienė once again protested the verdict. On 9 June 2009, the Vilnius District Court ordered the prosecutors to reopen the case a third time. Under court order, the case was also reclassified as a murder case. After investigations into official documents, over 100 witnesses questioned and experiments organized in the Inturist hotel in Brest, the case was closed as an accident again on 1 February 2013. Pociūnienė requested the case to be reopened again, but her request was dismissed.

=== 2008 "List of the Statesmen" publication ===
On 26 March 2008, an article titled "Lithuania Has Been Taken Over by the Statesmen Clan?" (Lithuanian: "Lietuvą užvaldė „valstybininkų" klanas?") was published on the newspaper Lietuvos žinios. This article compiled a list of 43 civil servants, diplomats, advisors of then-president Valdas Adamkus, VSD employees, businessmen, political scientists, and members of the Seimas, who were allegedly members of a single hierarchical structured "clan" which seeks to take over the state. According to editor-in-chief Valdas Vasiliauskas, it was published under a pseudonym to "protect the author from possible retaliation".

In the same month, Mečys Laurinkus published an open letter for Vytautas Landsbergis, requesting him to use his authority to end "the idiotic persecution of some civil servants that has been going on for almost two years now". Laurinkus also asked the leadership of TS-LKD to mention a single crime committed by the alleged "statesmen".

An investigation into the circumstances surrounding the formation of the Kirkilas Cabinet was proposed in the Seimas in 2008, but was voted down. Discussion of the "List of Statesmen" and the high point of the conspiracy theory coincided with the 2008 Lithuanian parliamentary election, which was seen as an opportunity for "De-Albinization". Several parties vowed to destroy the conspiracy's perceived power in their electoral campaigns. Opponents of the perceived "statesmen" described themselves as "patriots" (Lithuanian: "pilietininkai"). Both sides alleged that the other side was influenced or controlled by corporations and foreign interests - "statesmen" referred to the holding company MG Baltic and chemical company Achema, while "patriots" referred to Dujotekana and the business alliance "VP Ten", led by Nerijus Numavičius. Both sides accused the other of collusion with Russia.

The election was won by the Homeland Union, which was joined by the Liberal and Centre Union, the National Resurrection Party and the Liberal Movement in a centre-right "Coalition for Change" (Lithuanian: Permainų koalicija), which formed the Kubilius Cabinet II.

=== "Hawks" counter-conspiracy ===
In November 2008, VSD director Povilas Malakauskas informed the newly appointed Homeland Union prime minister Andrius Kubilius of the existence of an alleged anti-state group called "Hawks" (Lithuanian: "vanagai"). "Hawks" were journalists and politicians affiliated with the political right who were actively involved in the alleged "unmasking" of "statesmen" activity. Valdas Vasiliauskas, journalist Tomas Čyvas, Darius Kuolys (later founder of the Lithuanian List), Audrius Bačiulis, Virgis Valentinavičius (advisor of Andrius Kubilius), Vladas Laučius (chief editor of news portal Alfa.lt, previously consultant for MG Baltic Media) and others were alleged as members of this counter-conspiracy. Alleged members of this group claimed that this was a VSD attempt to control the media and influence politicians.

Edvardas Čiuldė claimed that "hawks" represented the interests of large media companies and were financed by the alcohol producer Stumbras, owned by MG Baltic.

=== Election of Dalia Grybauskaitė ===
Dalia Grybauskaitė, President of Lithuania from 2009 to 2019, won the 2009 Lithuanian presidential election with an anti-systemic platform and was supported by the Homeland Union. After her inauguration, several state officials implicated in the conspiracy theory were removed from office. In August 2009, in a controversial decree, she fired deputy director of the VSD Darius Jurgelevičius, while Mečys Laurinkus was accused of politicking in diplomatic service and recalled from the Lithuanian embassy in Georgia in late 2009. Valdas Vasiliauskas described it as "a war between the President and the Statesmen".

Albinas Januška retired from politics in late 2008 to herd sheep in a farm near Zarasai, but continued to unofficially advise politicians on state affairs.

By late 2010, the Homeland Union dropped their interest in the "statesmen" conspiracy theory and ceased investigations in government institutions such as the VSD, although it was still maintained by independent "hawk" journalists, the Civic Democracy Party and the Way of Courage party.

According to declassified VSD information, officials allegedly a part of the "Statesmen" group (including Albinas Januška and Raimondas Lopata) attempted to appoint Mindaugas Bastys as Minister of Agriculture in the Butkevičius Cabinet in 2012.

=== Revival ===
In early 2023, the conspiracy theory was revived after the publication of the book "The Whistleblower and the President" (Lithuanian: Pranešėjas ir prezidentas) by Dovydas Pancerovas and Birutė Davidonytė, which described alleged business and VSD involvement in the Gitanas Nausėda campaign during the 2019 Lithuanian presidential election, including illegal collection of personal information. After the publication of the book, MPs of the Lithuanian Farmers and Greens Union alleged that the book was published to discredit the incumbent president and proposed an investigation into "statesmen" activity, but the proposal did not find support even among the opposition.

In January 2024, Gitanas Nausėda's chief advisor Frederikas Jansonas claimed that appointments to vacant ambassador positions are delayed due to "statesmen" sabotage, and alleged that the conspiracy group is allied with the Šimonytė Cabinet. He identified members of the government, such as Žygimantas Pavilionis, as individuals listed in the 2008 "List of the Statesmen". Albinas Januška dismissed the allegations.

== Alleged members ==
Proponents of the conspiracy theory generally refer to individuals named in the "List of the Statesmen" (Lithuanian: "valstybininkų" sąrašas), which lists the alleged deep state's members and supporters. The list was originally published by the newspaper Lietuvos žinios on 26 March 2008:

- Albinas Januška, advisor to Gediminas Kirkilas (Prime Minister of Lithuania from 2006 to 2008), generally alleged to be the leader of the conspiracy;
- Mečys Laurinkus, director of the VSD from 1998 to 2004;
- Officials in the Ministry of Foreign Affairs:
  - Laimonas Tallat-Kelpša, ministry secretary;
  - Žygimantas Pavilionis, ministry secretary;
  - Violeta Gaižauskatė, ministry official;
  - Rimantas Šidlauskas, ambassador to Russia;
  - Viktoras Baublys, consul general to Kaliningrad;
  - Edminas Bagdonas, ambassador to Belarus;
  - Algirdas Kumža, ambassador to Ukraine;
  - Egidijus Meilūnas, ambassador to Poland;
  - Juozas Bernatonis, ambassador to Estonia, former vice-chairman of the Social Democratic Party of Lithuania;
- Advisors to Valdas Adamkus, President of Lithuania from 1998 to 2003 and from 2004 to 2009:
  - Valteris Baliukonis, advisor to the President on foreign policy;
  - Simonas Šatūnas, advisor to the President on foreign policy;
  - Lauras Bielinis, advisor to the President on internal policy;
  - Mindaugas Ladiga, advisor to the President, former VSD officer;
  - Aušra Rauličkytė, advisor to the President on legal matters;
- Members of the Institute of International Relations and Political Sciences of Vilnius University, alleged by conspiracy theorists to be a "Statesmen factory":
  - Raimundas Lopata, director of the institute from 1999 to 2009;
  - Audrius Siaurusevičius, journalist, lecturer;
- Egidijus Kūris, justice in the Constitutional Court of Lithuania and its president from 2002 to 2008;
- Povilas Makalauskas, director of the Special Investigation Service from 2004 to 2007;
- Valdas Tutkus, commander of the Lithuanian Armed Forces from 2004 to 2009;
- Algis Vaičeliūnas, general, candidate to director of the VSD in 2007, deputy of Albinas Januška on national defense;
- Kęstutis Lančinskas, deputy general commissioner of the Lithuanian Police Force;
- Gediminas Kirkilas, leader of the Social Democratic Party and Prime Minister from 2006 to 2008;
- Justinas Karosas, member of the Social Democratic Party, chairman of the Foreign Affairs Committee of the Seimas;
- Antanas Valionis, member of the Seimas from the New Union (Social Liberals), Minister of Foreign Affairs from 2000 to 2006;

The newspaper also claimed that other, unmentioned figures are affiliated with the conspiracy within political parties, in the legal system and in business.

== Impact ==
=== Political impact ===
The Statesmen conspiracy theory was pronounced during the 2008 Lithuanian parliamentary election. In their 2008 election programs, the Civic Democracy Party vowed to "destroy the "statesmen clan"", and Order and Justice claimed that they "seek power in order to restore the state to the people, which they were robbed by the "statesmen" clan". The conspiracy was also frequently referred to by politicians of the Homeland Union, such as Rasa Juknevičienė, as well as President Dalia Grybauskaitė, who connected it with Russian influence in the Lithuanian government.

During Kubilius Cabinet II, the death of Vytautas Pociūnas was brought up by Conservative politicians, such as Jurgis Razma, as waving the bloody shirt to support reforms to the State Security Department and the dissolution of the national energy company LEO LT.

The Statesmen conspiracy theory emerged at a similar time as the Case of Drąsius Kedys, another controversial legal case which led to public protest against perceived corruption and "clans" in the state apparatus. According to controversial journalist and TV presenter Rūta Janutienė, in both cases, "the victim is turned into the culprit of the accident, labels of alcoholics and drug addicts are attached to the deceased". Tomas Čyvas claimed that state security services connected to the conspiracy were responsible for separating Drąsius Kedys and his daughter. Similarly, the investigation into the unexplained assassination of VSD officer Juras Abromavičius took place in 2007, and some journalists and conspiracy theorists stated that they were committed by the same "mafia clan".

Vytautas Pociūnas' widow, Liudvika Pociūnienė, became a member of TS-LKD and was elected as a Member of the Seimas in the 2020 Lithuanian parliamentary election.

=== Foreign assessment ===
A 2006 November file on the resignation of Albinas Januška by the United States embassy in Lithuania was leaked from a document cache by WikiLeaks. In it, US officials express their surprise at Januška's resignation, mention his influence in the Kirkilas Cabinet and state theories about his resignation by questioned Lithuanian officials, including possible Russian involvement. According to the document,

Whenever a prominent official in Lithuania becomes the victim of a scandal, it is usual to blame Russia. We may never know why this mysterious official resigned. What still confuses us is that A. Januska resigned because of such hard-to-prove and unfounded accusations. For all we know, he could have overcome this situation if he had wanted to. However, we believe that this Svengali of Lithuania will remain active and influential in the circles of Lithuanian domestic and foreign politics in the future.

=== In popular culture ===
A previously unnamed street in the Pilaitė district in Vilnius was named Vytautas Pociūnas Street in 2016.

The conspiracy theory was parodied on the Lithuanian political satire TV show Dviračio žinios.

== See also ==
- Antaviliai
- Bražuolė bridge bombing
- 1993 Pakaunė mutiny
- lt:Juras Abromavičius
- Vytautas Pociūnas
