= Dalia Grybauskaitė =

President of Lithuania from 2009 to 2019

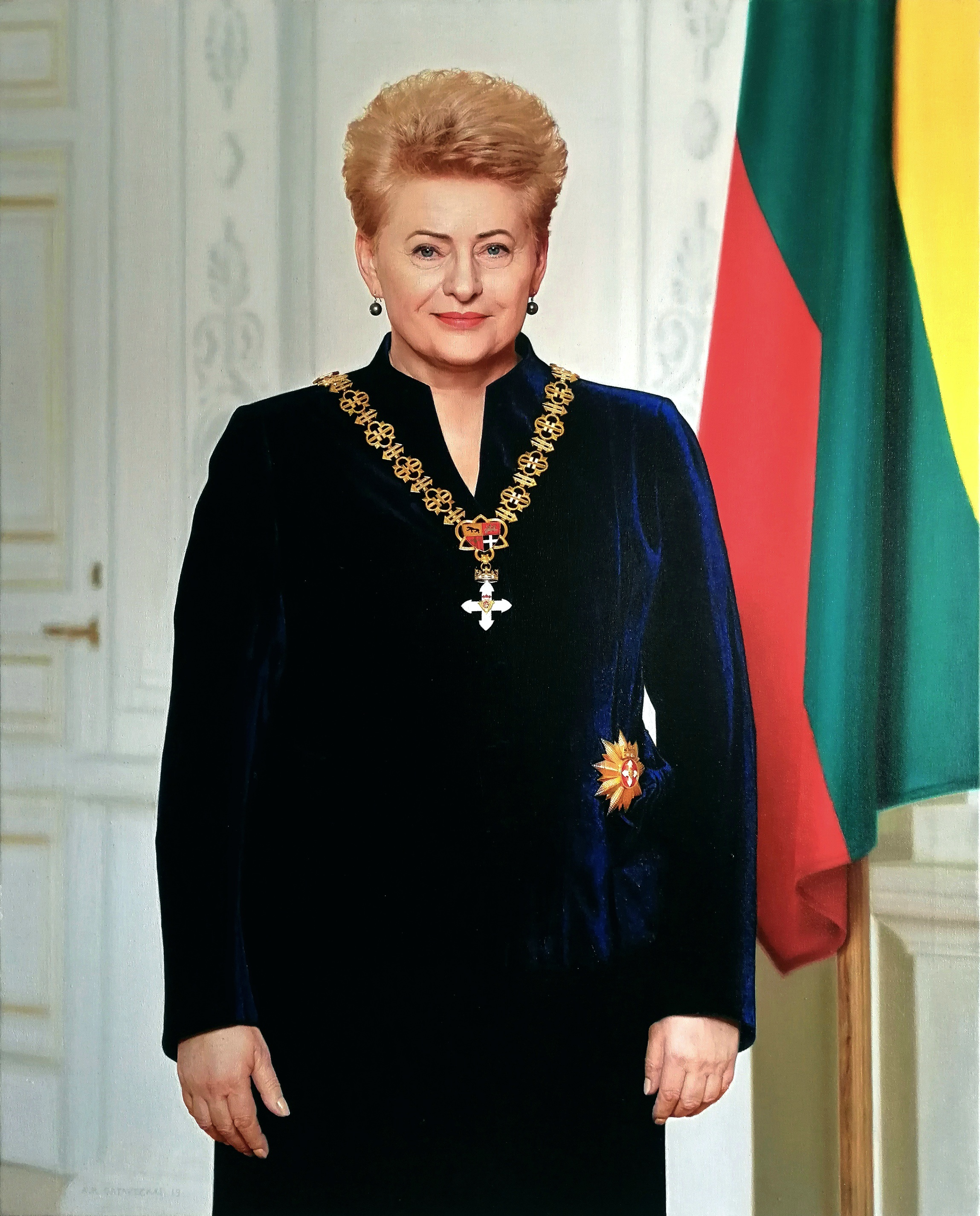
- Official portrait of Grybauskaitė, wearing the Grand Cross with Golden Chain of the Order of Vytautas the Great, 2019

8th President of Lithuania
- In office 12 July 2009 – 12 July 2019
- Prime Minister: Andrius Kubilius; Algirdas Butkevičius; Saulius Skvernelis
- Preceded by: Valdas Adamkus
- Succeeded by: Gitanas Nausėda

European Commissioner for Financial Programming and the Budget
- In office 22 November 2004 – 1 July 2009
- President: José Manuel Barroso
- Preceded by: Michaele Schreyer; Markos Kyprianou (Budget)
- Succeeded by: Algirdas Šemeta

European Commissioner for Education and Culture
- In office 1 May 2004 – 11 November 2004; Served with Viviane Reding
- President: Romano Prodi
- Preceded by: Viviane Reding
- Succeeded by: Ján Figeľ (Education, Training, Culture and Multilingualism)

Minister of Finance
- In office 12 July 2001 – 1 May 2004
- Prime Minister: Algirdas Brazauskas
- Preceded by: Jonas Lionginas
- Succeeded by: Algirdas Butkevičius

Personal details
- Born: 1 March 1956 (age 70) Vilnius, then part of Lithuanian SSR, Soviet Union
- Party: Communist Party of the Soviet Union (1983–1989); Communist Party of Lithuania (1989–1990); Independent (1990–present)
- Education: Leningrad State University; Georgetown University
- Dalia Grybauskaitė's voice Grybauskaitė discussing the European Commission's provisional draft budget for 2006; Recorded 27 April 2005

Dalia Grybauskaitė (Note: Lithuanian pronunciation: [dɐˈlʲɛ ɡrʲiːbɐʊsˈkɐ̂ˑɪtʲeː]) (born 1 March 1956) is a Lithuanian politician who served as the eighth president of Lithuania from 2009 to 2019. She is the first and so far only woman to hold the position and in 2014 she became the first President of Lithuania to be reelected for a second consecutive term.

Grybauskaitė has served as Minister of Finance, as well as European Commissioner for Financial Programming and the Budget from 2004 to 2009. She is often referred to as the "Iron Lady", or the "Steel Magnolia".

== Early years ==
Grybauskaitė was born on 1 March 1956 to a working-class family in Vilnius during the Soviet occupation of Lithuania. Her mother, Vitalija Korsakaitė (1922–1989), was born in the Biržai region and worked as a saleswoman. Her father, Polikarpas Grybauskas (1928–2008), was an electrician and driver. He also was a NKVD serviceman during the Second World War. Grybauskaitė attended Salomėja Nėris High School. She has two brothers, one living in Lithuania, and the other living in Colorado Springs, in the United States. She has described herself as not among the best students, receiving mostly fours in a system where five was the highest grade. Her favourite subjects were history, geography and physics.

Grybauskaitė began participating in sports at the age of eleven, and became a passionate basketball player. At the age of nineteen, she worked for a year at the Lithuanian National Philharmonic Society as a staff inspector. She then enrolled in A. A. Zhdanov State University in Leningrad, as a student of political economy. At the same time, she began working in a local factory in Leningrad. In 1983, Grybauskaitė graduated with a citation and returned to Vilnius, taking a secretarial position at the Academy of Sciences. Work in the academy was scarce and so she moved to the Vilnius Communist Party High School, where she lectured in political economics and global finance.

From 1983 to December 1989, she was a member of the Communist Party of the Soviet Union and after the Communist Party of Lithuania broke away from the CPSU in December 1989, she was member of the CPL until June 1990. In 1988, she defended her PhD thesis at Moscow (Academy of Social Sciences). In 1990, soon after Lithuania reestablished its independence from the Soviet Union, Grybauskaitė continued her studies at the Edmund A. Walsh School of Foreign Service at Georgetown University, Washington D.C., in the Special Programme for senior executives.

== Early career ==
Between 1991 and 1993, Grybauskaitė worked as Director of the European Department at the Ministry of International Economic Relations of the Republic of Lithuania. During 1993, she was employed in the Foreign Ministry as director of the Economic Relations Department, and represented Lithuania when it entered the European Union free trade agreements. She also chaired the Aid Coordination Committee (Phare and the G24). Soon afterwards, she was named Extraordinary Envoy and Plenipotentiary Minister at the Lithuanian Mission to the EU. There, she worked as the deputy chief negotiator for the EU Europe Agreement and as a representative of the National Aid Co-ordination in Brussels.

In 1996, Grybauskaitė was appointed Plenipotentiary Minister in the United States' Lithuanian embassy. She held this position until 1999, when she was appointed deputy Minister of Finance. As part of this role, she led Lithuanian negotiations with the World Bank and International Monetary Fund. In 2000, Grybauskaitė became Vice Minister of Foreign Affairs, going on in 2001 to become Minister of Finance in the Algirdas Brazauskas government. Lithuania joined the European Union on 1 May 2004, and Grybauskaitė was named a European Commissioner on the same day.

== European Commission ==
Grybauskaitė initially served as European Commissioner for Education, Culture, Multilingualism and Youth. She held this position until 11 November 2004, when she was named European Commissioner for Financial Programming and the Budget within the José Manuel Barroso-led Commission.

In November 2005, Grybauskaitė was named "Commissioner of the Year" in the European Voice Europeans of the Year poll. She was nominated "for her unrelenting efforts to shift EU spending towards areas that would enhance competitiveness such as research and development." She commented:

I don't usually participate in contests, so this is a very pleasant surprise for me. I consider it a distinction not for me personally, but for all the new EU Member States, both small and large, as an acknowledgment of their bringing a new and fresh perspective to the EU. I think that it's also a prize for having the courage to speak the often difficult truth and to point out the real price of political rhetoric in Europe. As for results, we still have to wait for them. An agreement on the budget for 2007–2013, which Europe really needs, is most important.

As Financial and Budget Commissioner, she strongly criticized the EU budget, stating it was "not a budget for the 21st century." The majority of the EU budget was spent on agricultural programmes. Grybauskaitė presented a 2008 EU budget in which, for the first time in its history, spending on growth and employment constituted the highest share of the budget, exceeding that of agriculture and natural resources. She frequently criticised the Lithuanian Government, headed by Prime Minister Gediminas Kirkilas, for its lack of response to the approaching financial crisis.

== 2009 presidential election ==
On 26 February 2009, Grybauskaitė officially announced her candidacy for the 2009 presidential election. In her declaration speech, she said:

I decided to return to Lithuania if the Lithuanian people decide I am needed there now. I think that we all long for the truth, transparency and responsibility for our country. We all want to live without fear, with confidence in ourselves, in each other, and in tomorrow. I can and I want to contribute with my experience, knowledge and skills to expel shadows from morality, politics, and economics to create a citizen-ruled Lithuania – a state of citizens. Therefore, I will run for the Lithuanian presidency.

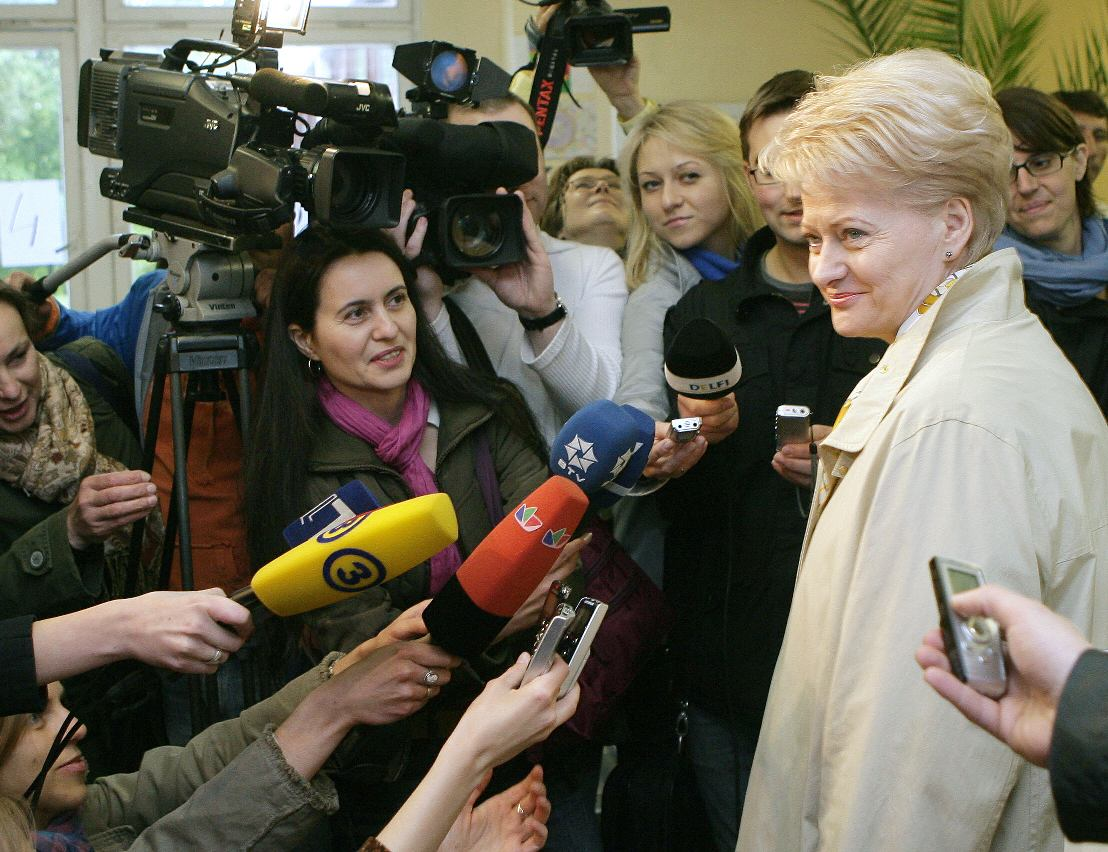
Grybauskaitė giving an interview during her 2009 presidential campaign.

There were three women and four men as presidential candidates. Opinion polls taken in February 2009 showed that Grybauskaitė was the undisputed leader in the race. She ran as an independent, although she was supported by the dominant Christian Democrats as well as by NGOs, including Sąjūdis.

Her campaign was primarily focused on domestic issues. After years of strong economic growth, Lithuania faced a deep recession, with double-digit declines in economic indicators. The unemployment rate rose to 15.5% in March 2009, and a January street protest against the government's response to the recession turned violent. During the campaign, Grybauskaitė stressed the need to combat the financial troubles by protecting those with the lowest incomes, simplifying the Lithuanian bureaucratic apparatus, and reviewing the government's investment programme. She also promised a more balanced approach in conducting foreign policy, the primary constitutional role of the Lithuanian presidency.

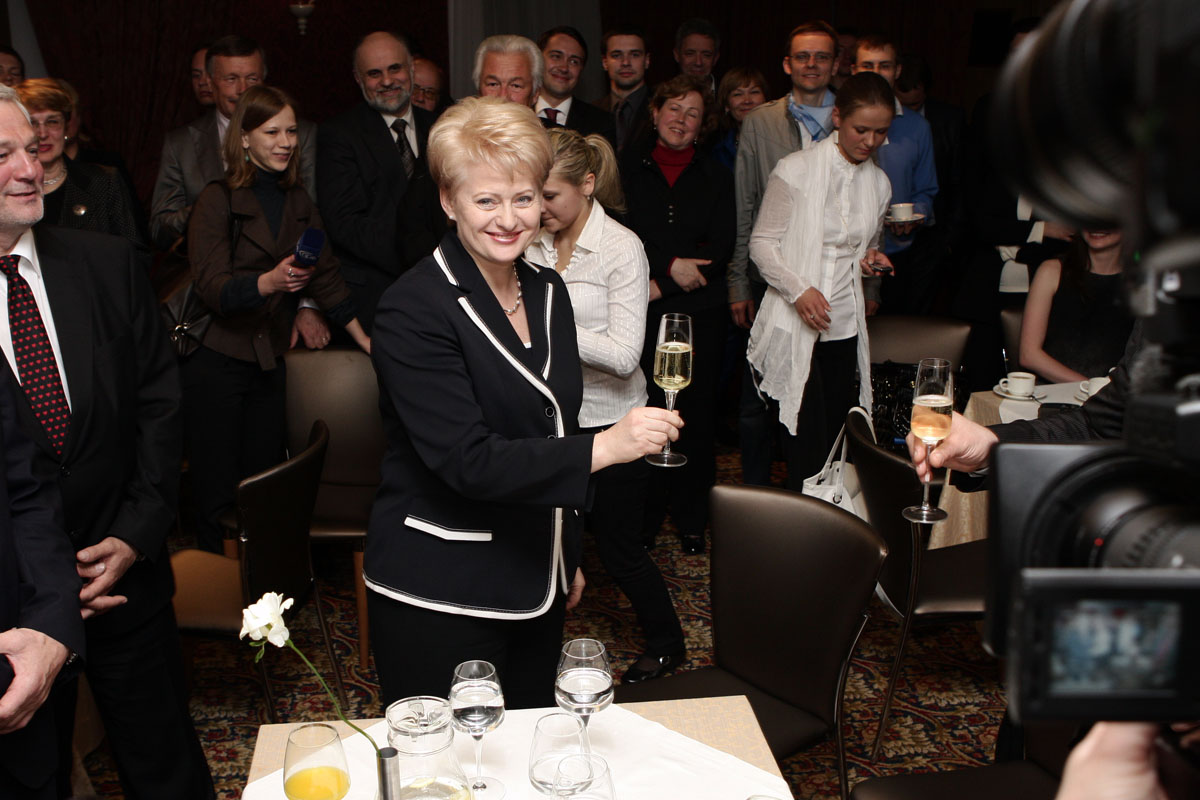
Grybauskaitė celebrating her landslide victory in 2009.

The election was held on 17 May 2009. Grybauskaitė won in a landslide, receiving 69.1% of the valid vote. The 51.6% turnout was just above the threshold needed to avoid a runoff election. In winning the election, Grybauskaitė became not only the first female president of Lithuania, but won by the largest margin recorded for a free election in Lithuania.

Political analysts attributed the easy victory to Grybauskaitė's financial competence and her ability to avoid domestic scandals. The international press was quick to dub her the "Lithuanian Iron Lady" for her outspoken speech and her black belt in karate. Grybauskaitė, who speaks Lithuanian, English, Russian, French and Polish, has mentioned Margaret Thatcher and Mahatma Gandhi as her political role models.

== Presidency (2009–2019) ==
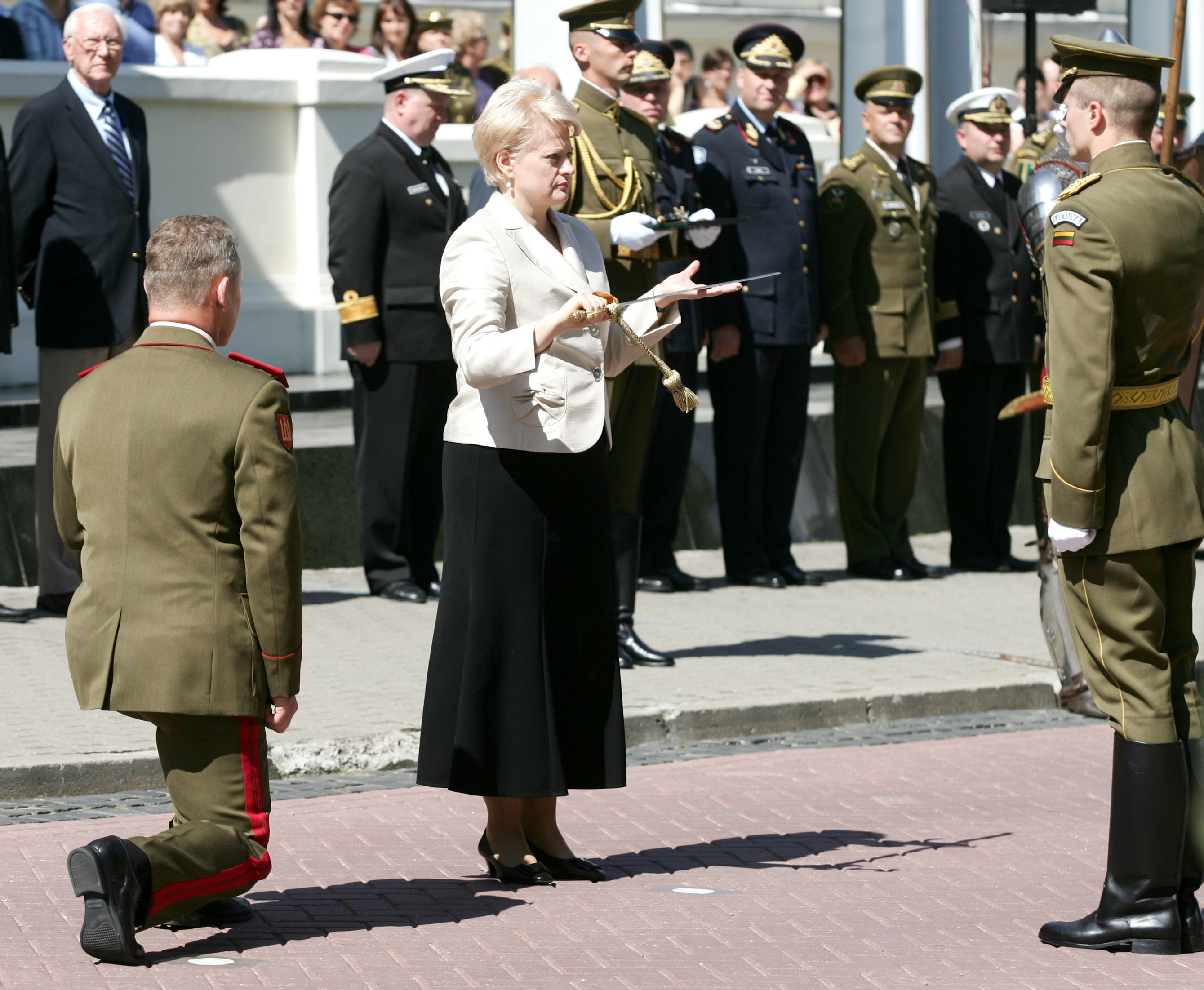
Grybauskaitė inaugurating Arvydas Pocius as the commander of the Lithuanian Armed Forces on 28 July 2009.

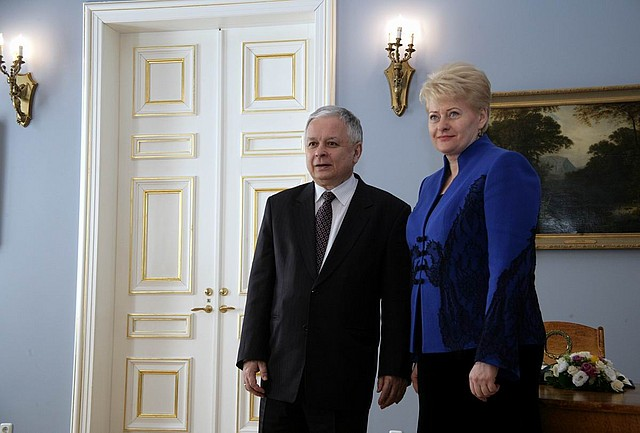
Grybauskaitė meeting with Polish President Lech Kaczyński in Vilnius, on 8 April 2010

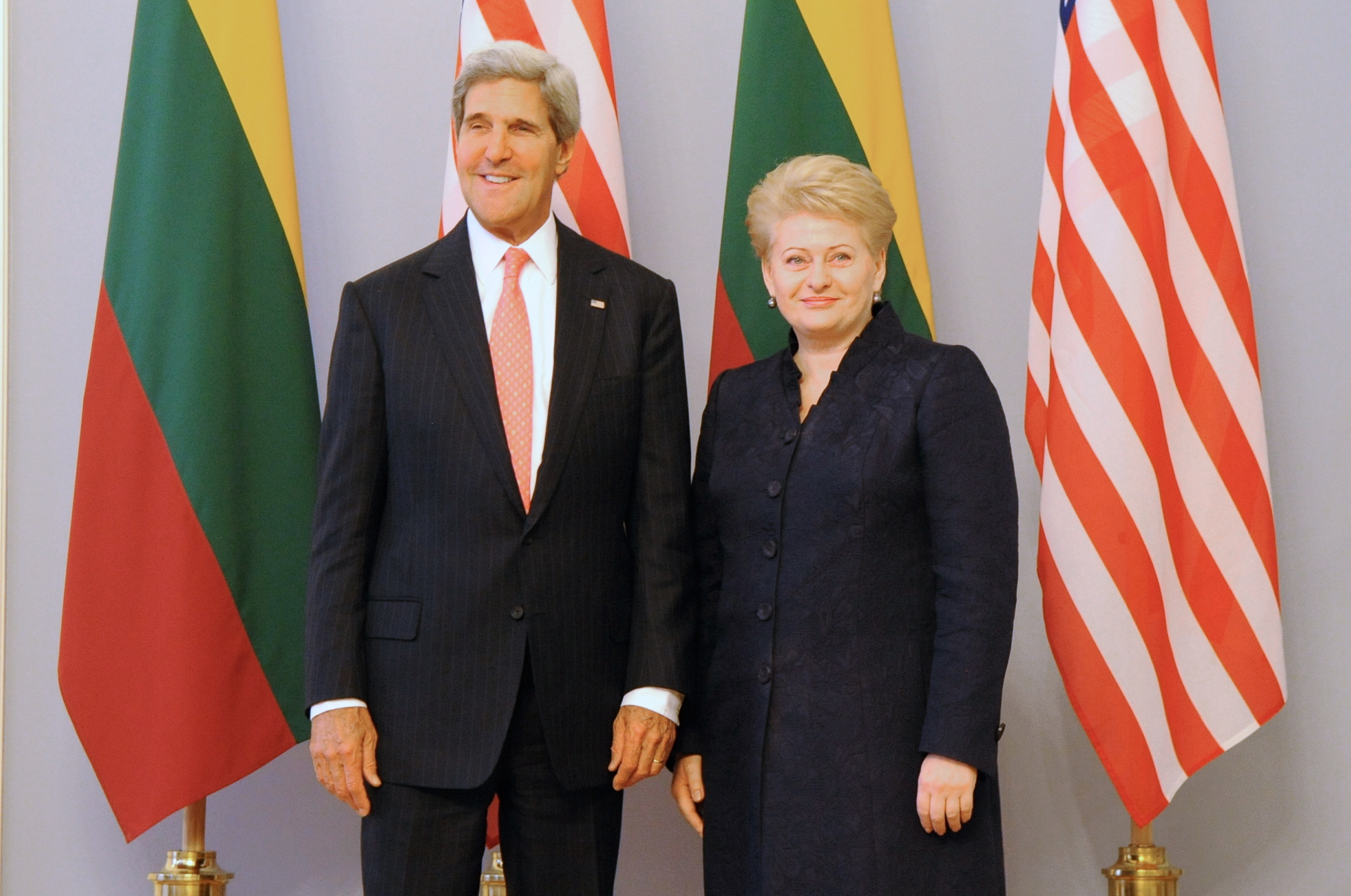
U.S. Secretary of State John Kerry meets with Grybauskaitė in Vilnius, 7 September 2013

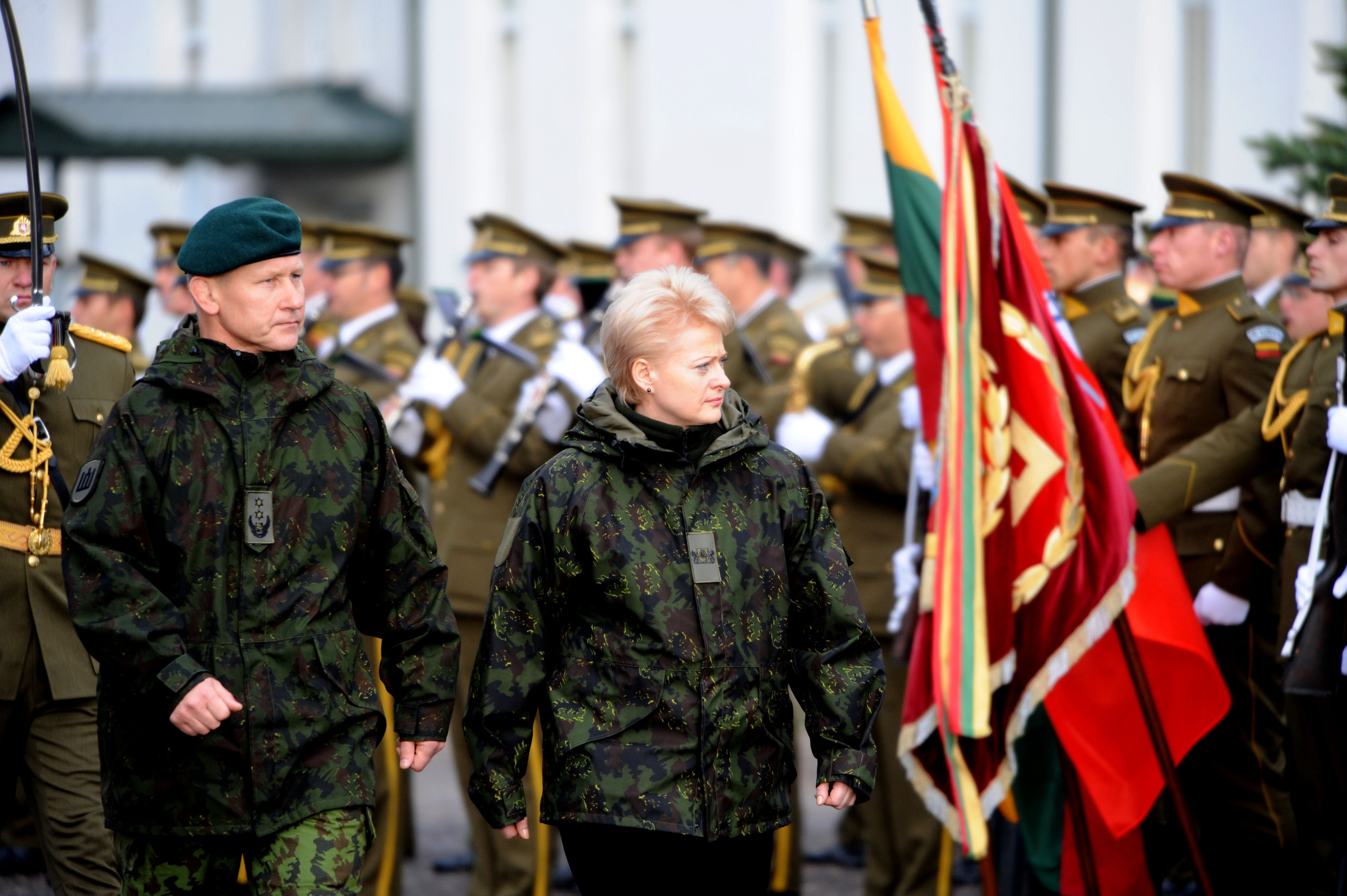
Grybauskaitė and Chief of Defence of Lithuania Arvydas Pocius.

Grybauskaitė assumed presidential duties on 12 July 2009, and accepted half of her presidential salary (312,000 litas). Her first presidential visits abroad were made to Sweden and Latvia; in April 2011, she made a state visit to Norway. Grybauskaitė supported the NATO-led military intervention in Libya. In 2014, Grybauskaitė was reelected President. She received 46% of the vote in the first round, and defeated Zigmantas Balčytis of the Social Democratic Party in the run-off with 58% of the vote.

=== Domestic policy ===
==== Style of leadership ====
According to Tapio Raunio and Thomas Sedelios, the office of President during Grybauskaitė's two terms was the strongest in Lithuanian history since 1990. Grybauskaitė took advantage of grey areas in the Constitution of Lithuania to accrue additional competences, such as a monopoly on Lithuania's representation in the European Council, and often made use of informal power, such as personal meetings between the Presidential office, Prime Ministers and individual ministers, to express positions on matters outside of the Presidency's competences.

During the campaign for the 2014 Lithuanian presidential election, Grybauskaitė was accused of "autocracy" and collusion with the Homeland Union. However, Grybauskaitė publicly stated that she does not support granting additional powers to the Presidency, instead claiming that the existing Presidential powers should be "used more effectively". Grybauskaitė is generally seen as a President friendly to the Homeland Union, and polls most strongly with conservative and liberal voters.

==== Campaign against the "Statesmen" ====
At time of Grybauskaitė's inauguration in 2009, the "Statesmen" conspiracy theory had been prominent in the press since the death of State Security Department (VSD) officer Vytautas Pociūnas in 2006. Proponents of the theory claimed that a deep state, led by officials in the VSD and the Ministry of Foreign Affairs, sought to take control of the country. Grybauskaitė's election platform included a vow to combat corruption in the government, as well as "the system". After her inauguration, several state officials implicated in the conspiracy theory were removed from office. In August 2009, in a controversial decree, she fired deputy director of the VSD Darius Jurgelevičius, while Mečys Laurinkus was accused of politicking in diplomatic service and recalled from the Lithuanian embassy in Georgia in late 2009. Valdas Vasiliauskas described it as "a war between the President and the Statesmen".

By late 2010, the Homeland Union, who were the most active promoters of the conspiracy theory, dropped their interest in it and ceased investigations in government institutions such as the VSD, although it was still maintained by independent journalists, the Civic Democracy Party and the Way of Courage party.

==== Conflict with the Seimas in 2012 ====
After the 2012 Lithuanian parliamentary election, Grybauskaitė declared that she would not accept any proposed cabinet which includes the Labour Party, which earned the second largest number of seats in the Seimas in the election. Labour, a populist political party led by Russian-born businessman Viktor Uspaskich, was implicated in the so-called "dark accounting" case in 2006 and was also seen by the President as a pro-Russian party. However, Grybauskaitė was unable to prevent the formation of a coalition between Labour and the Social Democrats, which took office as the Butkevičius Cabinet. Grybauskaitė remained influential during the rest of the term and vetted Labour-proposed minister candidates with various means, including testing ministerial candidates on their knowledge of English. After the Electoral Action of Poles in Lithuania left the coalition in 2014 and their minister Jarosław Niewierowicz resigned, the position of Minister of Energy officially fell to Labour, but Niewierowicz's replacement, Rokas Masiulis, was widely seen as Grybauskaitė's candidate.

=== Foreign policy ===
==== Relations with Russia ====
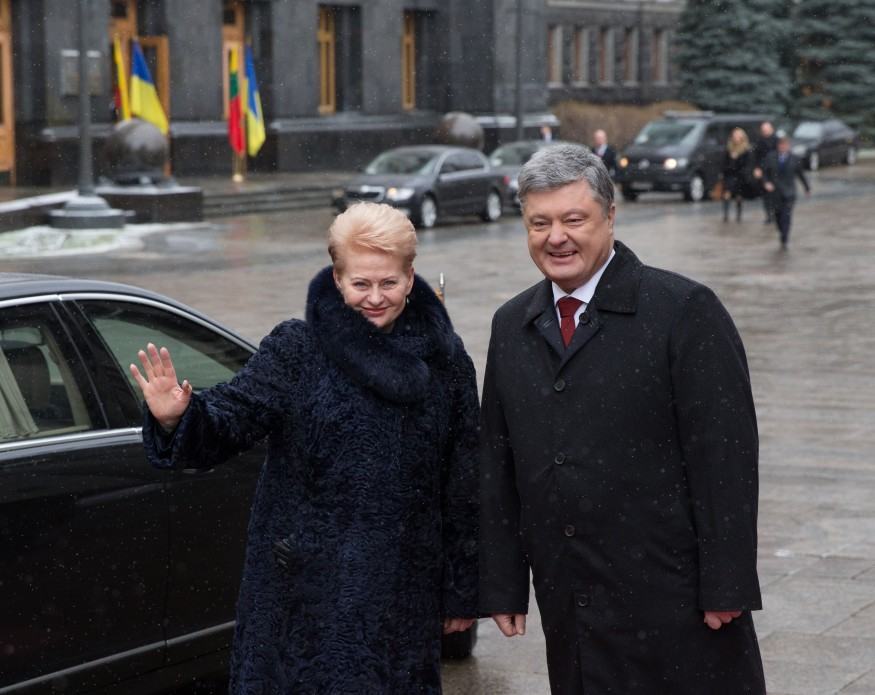
Grybauskaitė and Petro Poroshenko in Kyiv, Ukraine, December 2016

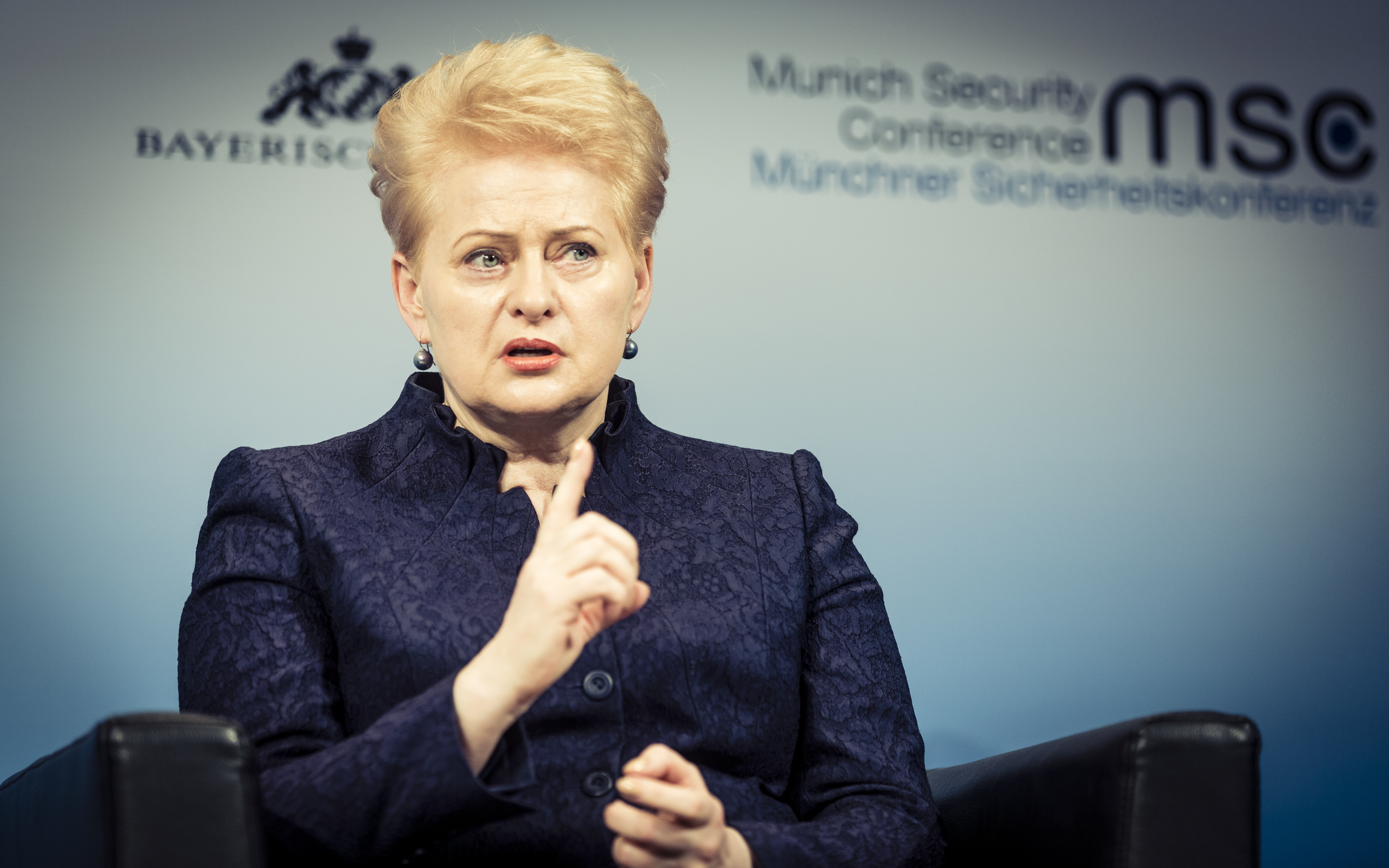
Grybauskaitė during the 53rd Munich Security Conference 2017

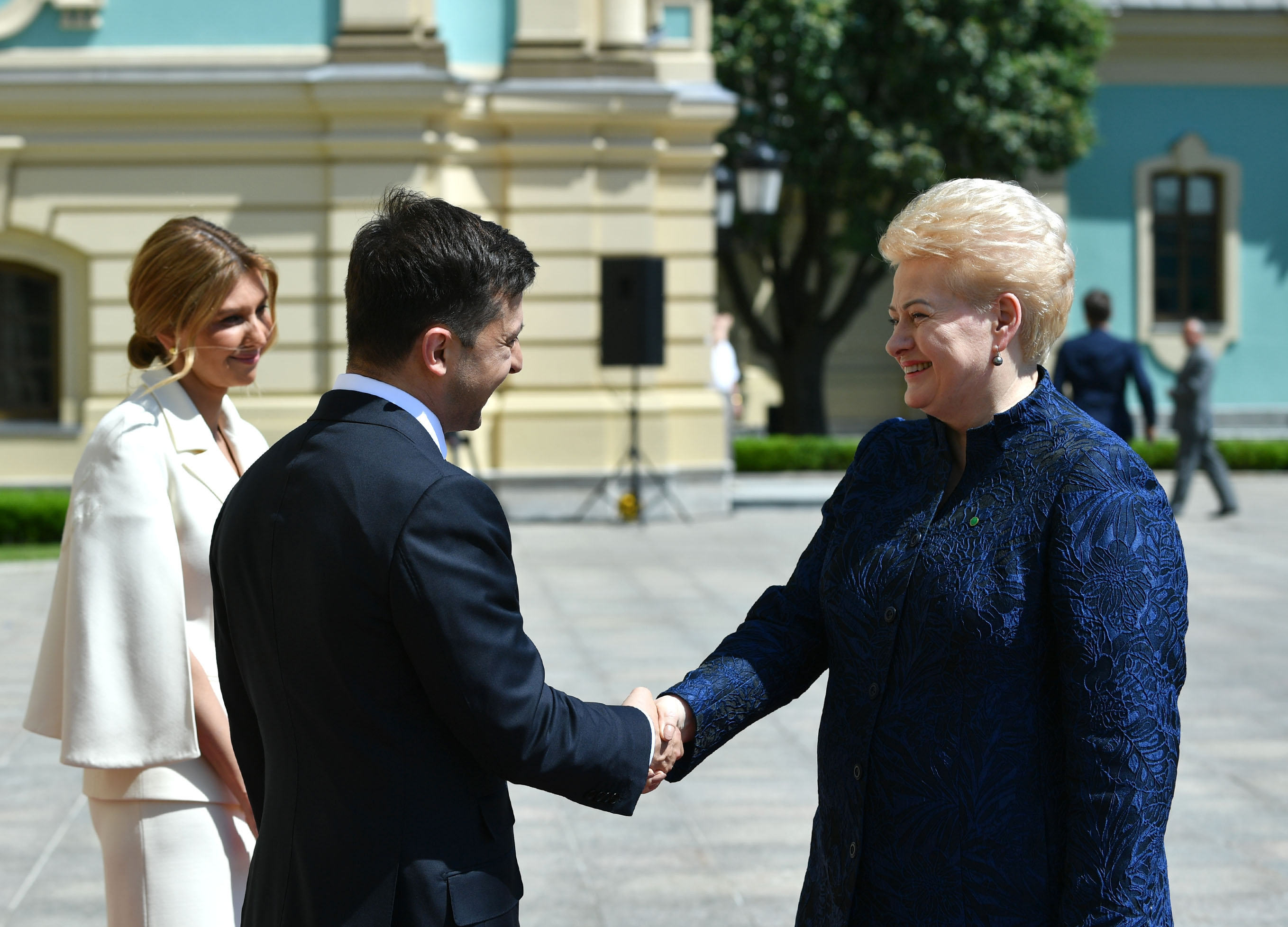
Grybauskaitė with Volodymyr Zelenskyy and his wife Olena in May 2019

At the beginning of her first term, Grybauskaitė tried to reset relations with Russia and check whether pragmatic relations with Russia were possible. In 2010, Grybauskaitė even met with Russian Prime Minister Vladimir Putin in Helsinki. After her presidency, Grybauskaitė described the meeting as a clarifying point, stating "I realised that this person and country is not willing to accept their neighbors honorably, that they are trying to make you kneel on your knees; Either you give in, or you are the enemy." During the meeting, according to her, Putin presented a list of demands to fulfill, encompassing increasing the interconnectedness and interdependence of the Lithuanian–Russian energy sectors. The president found these unconsiderable as an avenue for the Russian coercion. After this meeting, relations between Lithuania and Russia began to cool down.

On 19 December 2013, Grybauskaitė decided to boycott the Sochi Winter Olympics together with other Western leaders, including German president Joachim Gauck, French president François Hollande, and the US president Barack Obama, due to Russia's human rights violations, attitudes and behaviour with Eastern partners and Lithuania. Relations with Russia markedly deteriorated during Grybauskaitė's second term in office, due in part to her hard line stance against Russian influence in Europe and the Baltics, especially after the start of the Russo-Ukrainian War. In May 2014, Grybauskaitė called the dependence on Russian gas an "existential threat" to Lithuania.

Following her reelection in May 2014, Grybauskaitė said "Dignity, self-respect and mutual benefit, these are the principles that should set the basis for relations between countries and no doubt, knowing that this is our neighbor, we wish this country to democratize and cope with the arising economic challenges". In June 2014, Grybauskaitė told the German news magazine Focus: "[Putin] uses nationality as a pretext to conquer territory with military means. That's exactly what Stalin and Hitler did." She also claimed that Russia and Putin were "characterised by aggressiveness, violence, and a willingness to overstep boundaries."

On 20 November 2014, Grybauskaitė, commenting on the Russo-Ukrainian war, characterized Russia as "a terrorist state which carries out an open aggression against its neighbors". In June 2018, Grybauskaitė said that Lithuania should be ready for Russian invasion. She also said that Western states will "wake up" only "when they have been attacked" by Russia. In December 2018, Grybauskaitė told Ukrainian President Petro Poroshenko that Lithuania would increase military assistance to Ukraine: "We will additionally supply more ammunition, send more military instructors and cyber security experts to help repel hybrid attacks, especially during the elections."

==== Relations with the EU and United States ====
In December 2014, Grybauskaitė said that Lithuania will have to take the responsibility for the secret CIA-operated prison in Lithuania. Regarding British Prime Minister Theresa May's comments on acting as a "bridge" between the European Union and the United States, Grybauskaitė said that "I don't think there is a necessity for a bridge. We communicate with the Americans on Twitter." In March 2017, Grybauskaitė criticized the government of Poland and Prime Minister Beata Szydło for not endorsing Donald Tusk again for the President of the European Council.

==== Brexit ====
In January 2019, Grybauskaitė said a "no-deal Brexit" would be better than delaying Brexit. She said the EU would negotiate mini or sectoral arrangements to mitigate a no-deal scenario.

== Post-presidency (2019–present) ==
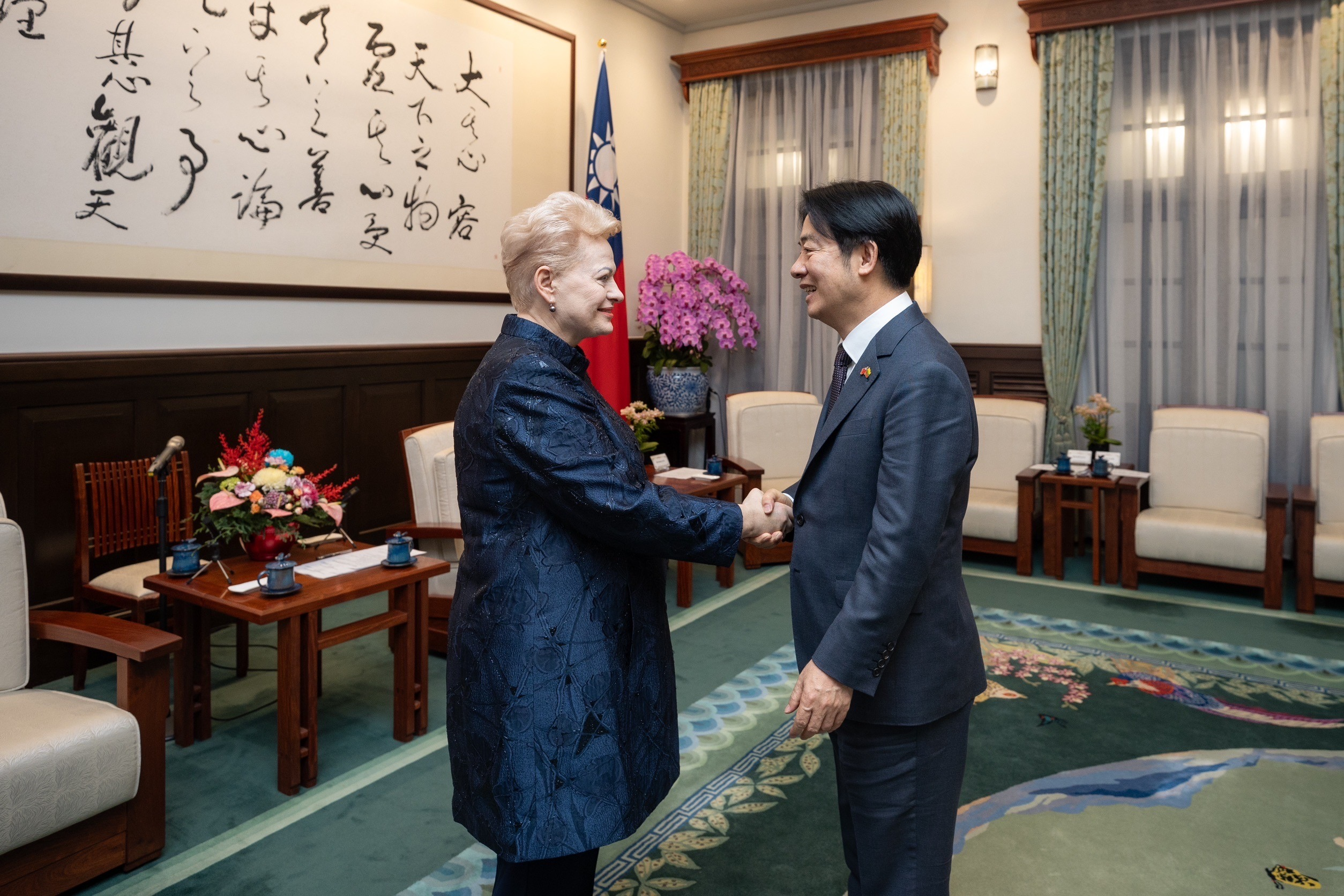
Grybauskaitė meeting with President of Taiwan William Lai Ching-te during her visit to Taiwan (2024)

In March 2020, Grybauskaitė was appointed by the President of the United Nations General Assembly and the President of the United Nations Economic and Social Council as one of the two co-chairs of the High Level Panel on International Financial Accountability Transparency and Integrity for Achieving the 2030 Agenda (FACTI Panel).

Following the 2022 Russian invasion of Ukraine, Grybauskaitė publicly supported a direct NATO military confrontation with Russia believing the diplomatic negotiations had failed and more sanctions won't deter Russia from pursuing its military goals. "War can be only stopped by a war, which has already started," Grybauskaitė wrote on Facebook. She added, "I'm ashamed to hear that leaders and officials of NATO states are muttering about not being able to involve in the conflict but being fine with it in the case of Syria, Libya, Africa, Yugoslavia, and Afghanistan?"

In 2024, Hillary Rodham Clinton Awards recognized Grybauskaitė for her opposition to Russian aggression, with Hillary Clinton noting "her prescient warnings about the growing aggressiveness of Vladimir Putin, warnings that a lot of people did not want to hear at that time, with the hope that ignoring him and them would cause them to disappear, but Dalia understood the threats that an aggressive Russia under Putin posed before many others did."

In November 2024, following the Lithuanian parliamentary election, Grybauskaitė sharply criticized the decision of the victorious Social Democrats to ally in a coalition with the nationalist party Dawn of Nemunas, whose founder Remigijus Žemaitaitis is known for antisemitic statements. She wrote that she viewed the incoming government as a "Kremlin-scented coalition with fascist brownshirt seasoning" and that the inclusion of Dawn of Nemunas was already causing "irreparable reputational damage" to Lithuania in the eyes of its EU and NATO partners.

== Personal life ==
In addition to her native Lithuanian, she is fluent in English, Russian and Polish, and also speaks French. Grybauskaitė has a black belt in karate.

== Public image ==
Grybauskaitė is often praised by supporters for her strength of leadership, while in office, she was presented as a dutiful politician who fights corruption and seeks to establish order in the country. Opponents would often characterise Grybauskaitė's style of leadership as authoritarian-like.

=== Relationship with the foreign press ===
In 2015, Grybauskaitė received some backlash in Latvia as well as Lithuania after an interview for Latvian Television. The conversation took a different turn after journalist Gundars Rēders asked about the possibility of legalisation of same-sex marriages in Lithuania. The President of Lithuania responded by saying that there are no discussions regarding this question and added: "I think we did not agree on these questions. We agreed on questions and you don't try to drag me on for 40 minutes. If you're finished with your questions, we're finished." Grybauskaitė demanded that the latter segment of the interview would be cut out and turned down any further questions, saying: "You cannot ask non-agreed questions for the President. I don't give such kind of interviews." Latvians, especially the journalist community, expressed their dismay on social media towards the Lithuanian President. Latvian journalist Inga Spriņģe reacted to the interview on Twitter, by saying: "Hmm, if Grybauskaitė demanded so fiercely to cut out the questions that were not agreed upon beforehand, I have a feeling that for Lithuanian journalists it is the norm."

== Controversies ==
=== KGB accusations ===
Grybauskaitė has repeatedly denied having any ties with the Soviet intelligence services. Lithuanian investigative journalist Rūta Janutienė made an episode on Grybauskaitė showcasing various documents about her possible ties with the KGB but this episode never officially aired on TV3. In 2015, politician Zigmas Vaišvila had appealed to the Ministry of Internal Affairs of Russia as well as the Embassy of Russia in Lithuania for them to disclose the information about whether or not Grybauskaitė worked for the USSR Embassy in the US in 1991. Russian institutions had refused to provide any insight on the matter stating: "According to the Article 7 on Personal Data of the Federal Law, operators and inner employees who have access to personal data are obligated not to disclose any information to a third party or share any personal information without the consent of the subject to whom it belongs." EUvsDisinfo has documented the accusations as disinformation spread by the pro-Kremlin media whereas The Insider has claimed the ex-KGB agent allegations about Grybauskaitė being false noting that the letters allegedly written in 1982 contain inaccuracies and suspicious formulations.

During an interview, the creator of the documentary The Secret of the State about Grybauskaitė, Donatas Ulvydas, claimed she did go to a KGB school. According to Ulvydas, she stated: "Yes, I was studying there and there's nothing here more to talk about." Despite Ulvydas' explanation that his former claim was lapsus linguae on Facebook, politician Naglis Puteikis attempted to launch an investigation in the Lithuanian Seimas, but the initiative did not get enough support.

=== "Tulip post" controversy ===
In September 2019, Grybauskaitė was at the centre of the "tulip post" corruption scandal, which was one of the greatest blows to her political career. Emails from 2014 to 2016 suggested that the President possibly knew about the unlawful relations between politician Eligijus Masiulis and the business group MG Baltic. She had also allegedly pressured Masiulis into following her orders such as convincing the then-ruling Social Democratic Party, to prevent Saulius Skvernelis from getting a post "if he goes to a party that is not aiming for a coalition". The scandal had significantly affected the President's ratings with the polls indicating a drop of almost 11% of support from the general public. The per cent of people having a negative opinion about Grybauskaitė rose from 18.5% to 27.5%. The President stated that she cannot confirm the authenticity of these emails but confirmed her correspondence with politicians.

== Awards ==
Grybauskaitė has received the following national and international awards:

Year	Award	Issuer
2003	The Commander's Cross of the Order of the Lithuanian Grand Duke Gediminas	Lithuania
2009	The Order of Vytautas the Great with the Golden Chain	Lithuania
2011	Commander Grand Cross with Chain of the Order of the Three Stars	Latvia
2011	Knight Grand Cross of the Royal Norwegian Order of St. Olav	Norway
2011	Knight Grand Cross of the Order of the Falcon	Iceland
2012	Member of Xirka Ġieħ ir-Repubblika	Malta
2012	Grand Officer of the Order of Saint-Charles	Monaco
2013	Knight Grand Cross with Collar of the Order of the White Rose of Finland	Finland
2013	Knight Grand Cross with Collar of the Order of the Cross of Terra Mariana	Estonia
2013	Grand Cross Special Class of the Order of Merit of the Federal Republic of Germany	Germany
2013	Charlemagne Prize for 2013	Aachen
2015	Order of the Republic	Moldova
2015	Collar of the Order pro merito Melitensi	SMOM
2015	Knight of the Order of the Seraphim	Sweden
2016	Order for Exceptional Merits	Slovenia
2016	Collar of the Order of the Star of Romania	Romania
2018	Knight Grand Cross of the Order of the Netherlands Lion	Netherlands
2018	Knight Grand Cross of the Order of Merit of the Italian Republic with Collar	Italy
2018	Member of the Order of Liberty	Ukraine
2019	Knight of the Order of the White Eagle	Poland

Political offices
New office	Lithuanian European Commissioner; 2004–2009	Succeeded by Algirdas Šemeta
Preceded by Viviane Reding	European Commissioner for Education and Culture; 2004; Served alongside: Viviane Reding	Succeeded by Ján Figeľ as European Commissioner for Education, Training, Culture and Multilingualism
Preceded by Michaele Schreyer; Markos Kyprianou as European Commissioner for the Budget	European Commissioner for Financial Programming and the Budget; 2004–2009	Succeeded by Algirdas Šemeta
Preceded by Valdas Adamkus	President of Lithuania; 2009–2019	Succeeded by Gitanas Nausėda
Diplomatic posts
Preceded by Tarja Halonen	Chair of the Council of Women World Leaders; 2014–2019	Succeeded by Kolinda Grabar-Kitarović
