= Lauras =

Lauras may refer to:

- Lauras Bielinis, a Lithuanian political scientist
- Lauras Januševičius, Lithuanian footballer
- Lauras Stacevičius, Lithuanian politician

== See also ==
- Lauras Stern, German animated children's television series
- Lauras Entscheidung, German television film
- Laura (disambiguation)
