= Gitanas Nausėda =

President of Lithuania since 2019

His Excellency Gitanas Nausėda
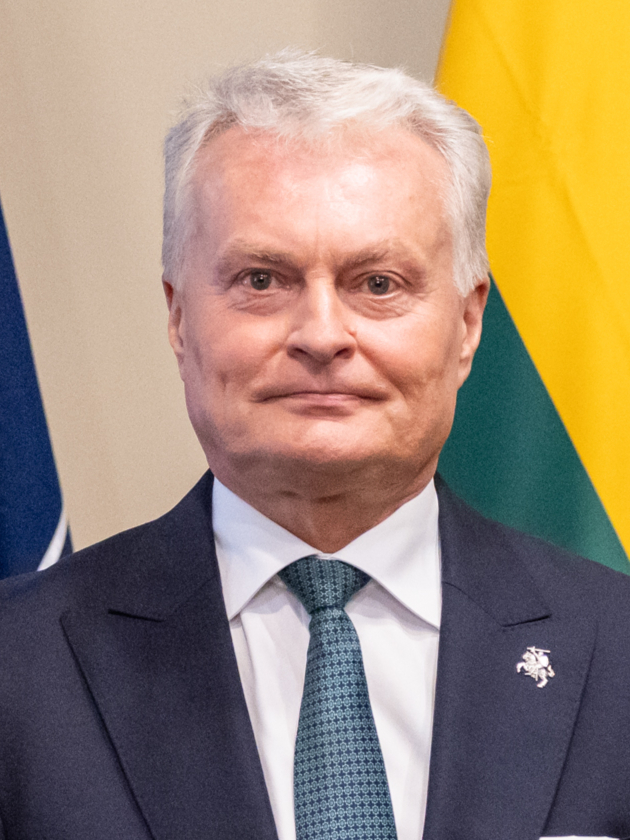
- Nausėda in 2025

9th President of Lithuania
- Incumbent
- Assumed office 12 July 2019
- Prime Minister: Saulius Skvernelis; Ingrida Šimonytė; Gintautas Paluckas; Rimantas Šadžius (acting); Inga Ruginienė; Mindaugas Sinkevičius
- Preceded by: Dalia Grybauskaitė

Personal details
- Born: 19 May 1964 (age 62) Klaipėda, then part of Lithuanian SSR, Soviet Union
- Party: Independent
- Other political affiliations: Communist Party of the Soviet Union (1988–1991)
- Spouse: Diana Nausėdienė (m. 1990)
- Children: 2
- Education: Vilnius University (B.Sc) University of Mannheim (PhD)

Gitanas Nausėda (/ɡɪˈtɑːnəs naʊˈsɛdə/; Lithuanian: [ɡʲɪˈtˠɐnˠɐs nˠɐʊˈsʲeːdˠɐ]; born 19 May 1964) is a Lithuanian politician, economist, banker, and diplomat who is serving as the ninth and incumbent president of Lithuania since 2019. Born in Klaipėda, Nausėda graduated from Vilnius University with an economics degree in 1987. He was director of monetary policy at the Bank of Lithuania from 1996 to 2000 and chief economist to the chairman of SEB bankas from 2008 to 2018.

Nausėda entered politics in 2019, running as an independent candidate in the 2019 Lithuanian presidential election. In the second round of the election, he defeated the independent (but Homeland Union-endorsed) Ingrida Šimonytė, with 66% of the vote. His success has been attributed to his moderate, "catch-all" profile. As president, Nausėda oversaw Lithuania's response to the 2020–2021 Belarusian protests and the Russian invasion of Ukraine. He has had a difficult relationship with the Šimonytė Cabinet, including proposals of impeachment and several political scandals.

On 7 December 2023, Nausėda announced his decision to run for re-election in the 2024 Lithuanian presidential election and was re-elected for a second term on 26 May 2024.

== Early life and education ==
Nausėda was born on 19 May 1964 in the port city Klaipėda on the Baltic coast. He started his secondary studies at the Klaipėda 5th Secondary School and also attended the Klaipėda Music School where he sang in the boys' choir "Gintarėlis".

After secondary school he moved to Vilnius where he studied Industrial Economics from 1982 to 1987 at Vilnius University. Afterwards, he continued his studies as a post-graduate student of Economics from 1987 until 1989. As a student, Nausėda registered to join the Communist Party of the Soviet Union (CPSU) in 1988 at the age of 24. From 1987 to 2004 he occasionally lectured on economic topics at the university.

From 1990 to 1992, he participated in an academic exchange program at the University of Mannheim in Germany under the DAAD scholarship. He defended his PhD thesis "Income Policy Under Inflation and Stagflation" in 1993. Upon returning to Lithuania, he worked for the Lithuanian Competition Council as Head of the Financial Markets Department until 1994. Since 2009 he has been an associate professor at Vilnius University Business School.

== Professional and political career ==
Having completed his studies, from 1992 to 1993 he worked for the Research Institute for Economics and Privatization. From 1993 to 1994 he worked for the Lithuanian Competition Council as a head of the Financial Markets Department. From 1994 to 2000 he worked at the Bank of Lithuania, initially in the department regulating the commercial banks and later as a director of the Monetary Policy Department. From 2000 to 2008 he was a chief economist and adviser to the chairman of AB Vilniaus Bankas. From 2008 to 2018 he was the financial analyst as well as chief adviser and later the chief economist for the SEB bankas president.

In 2004, he supported the election campaign of the former Lithuanian president Valdas Adamkus.

== Presidency (2019–present) ==
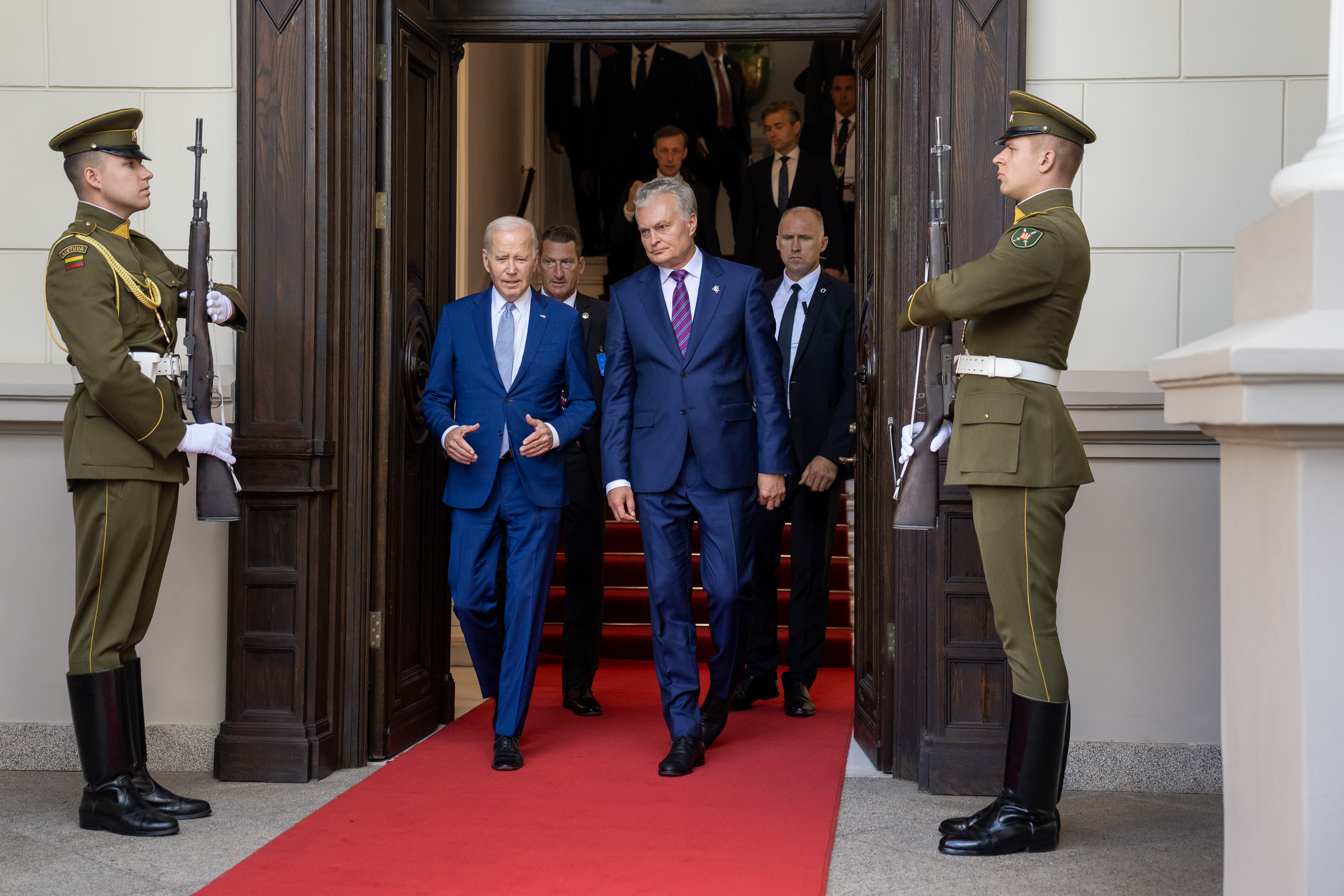
Gitanas Nausėda meets the President of the United States Joe Biden during the 2023 Vilnius summit

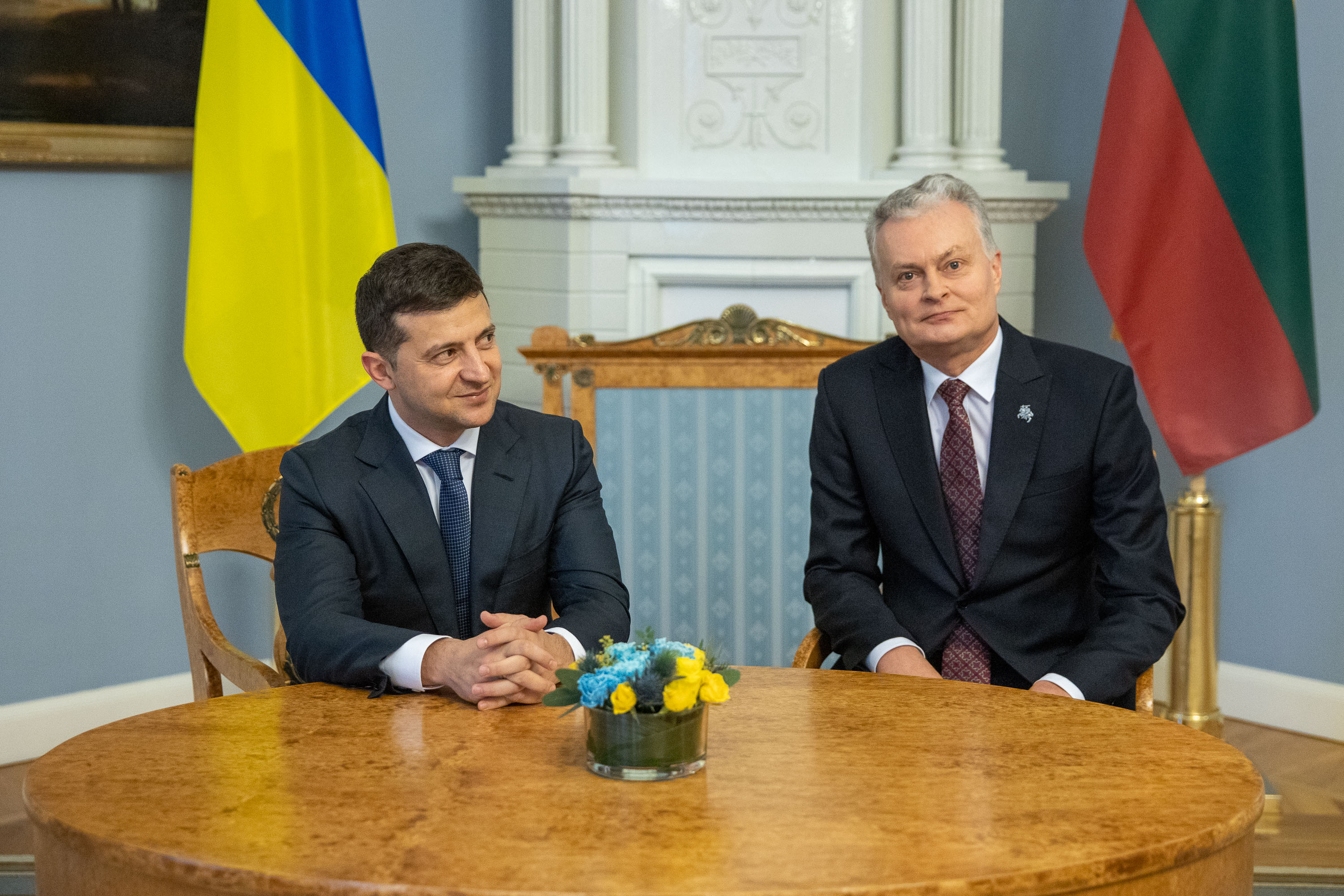
Gitanas Nausėda meeting with the President of Ukraine Volodymyr Zelenskyy in Vilnius in November 2019

On 17 September 2018, Nausėda announced his candidacy for the 2019 Lithuanian presidential election. He finished just 2,000 votes behind former finance minister Ingrida Šimonytė in the first round, and defeated her in the runoff with 66 percent of the vote.

He was officially inaugurated on 12 July. Nausėda presented acting prime minister Saulius Skvernelis's candidacy to continue his duties on 18 July. By the time he had spent a month in office, Nausėda was considered to be the most trusted politician in Lithuania according to polls conducted by the Lithuanian National Radio and Television (LRT).

=== Foreign policy ===
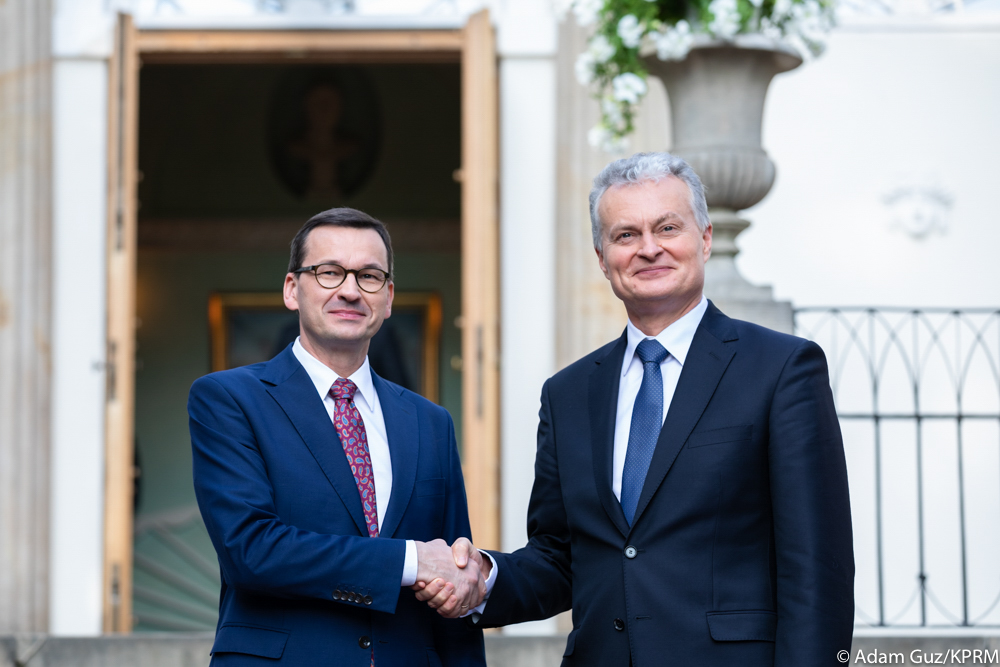
President Nausėda during meeting with Prime Minister of Poland Mateusz Morawiecki in July 2019

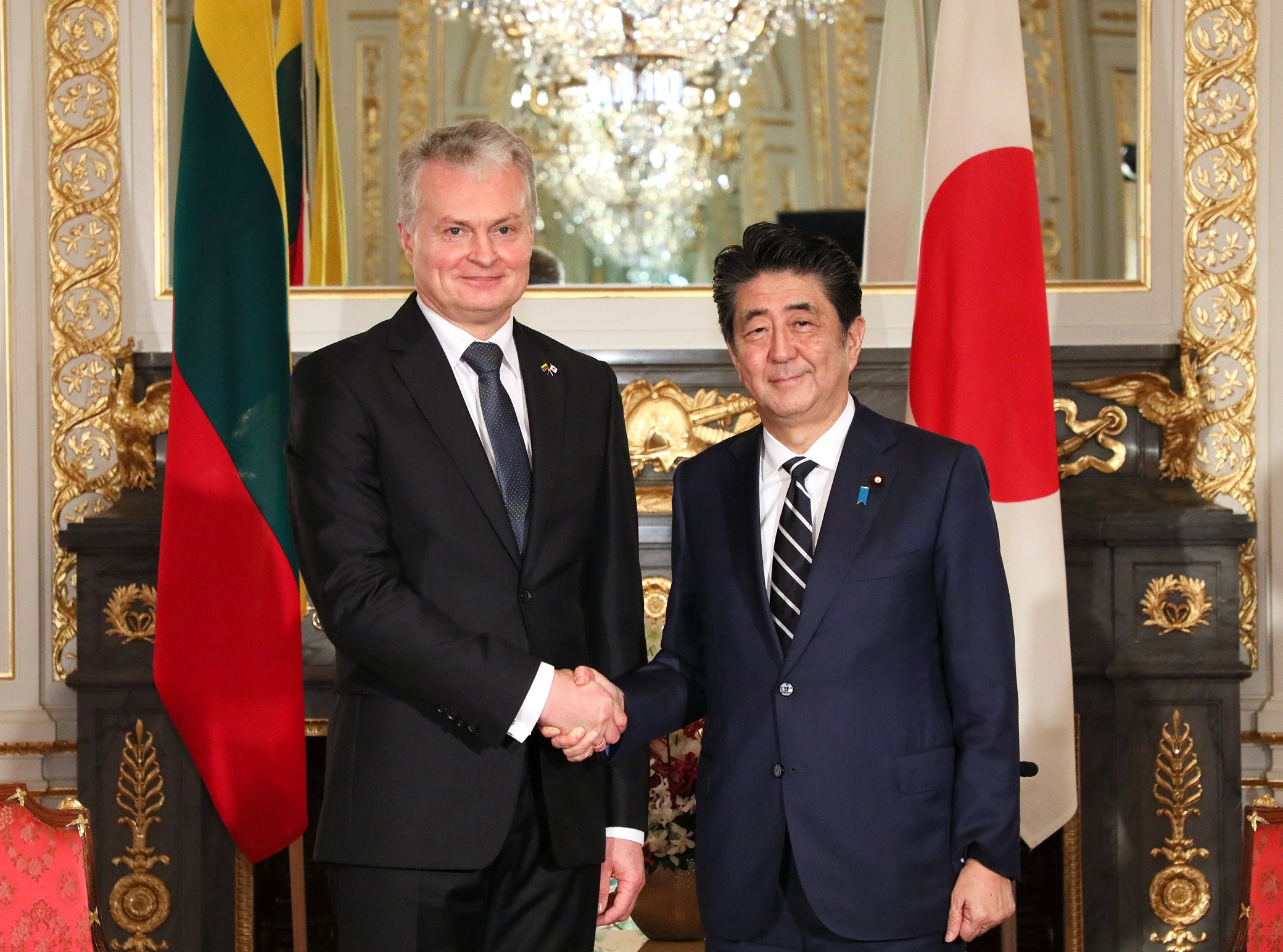
Nausėda meets with the prime minister of Japan Shinzo Abe in October 2019

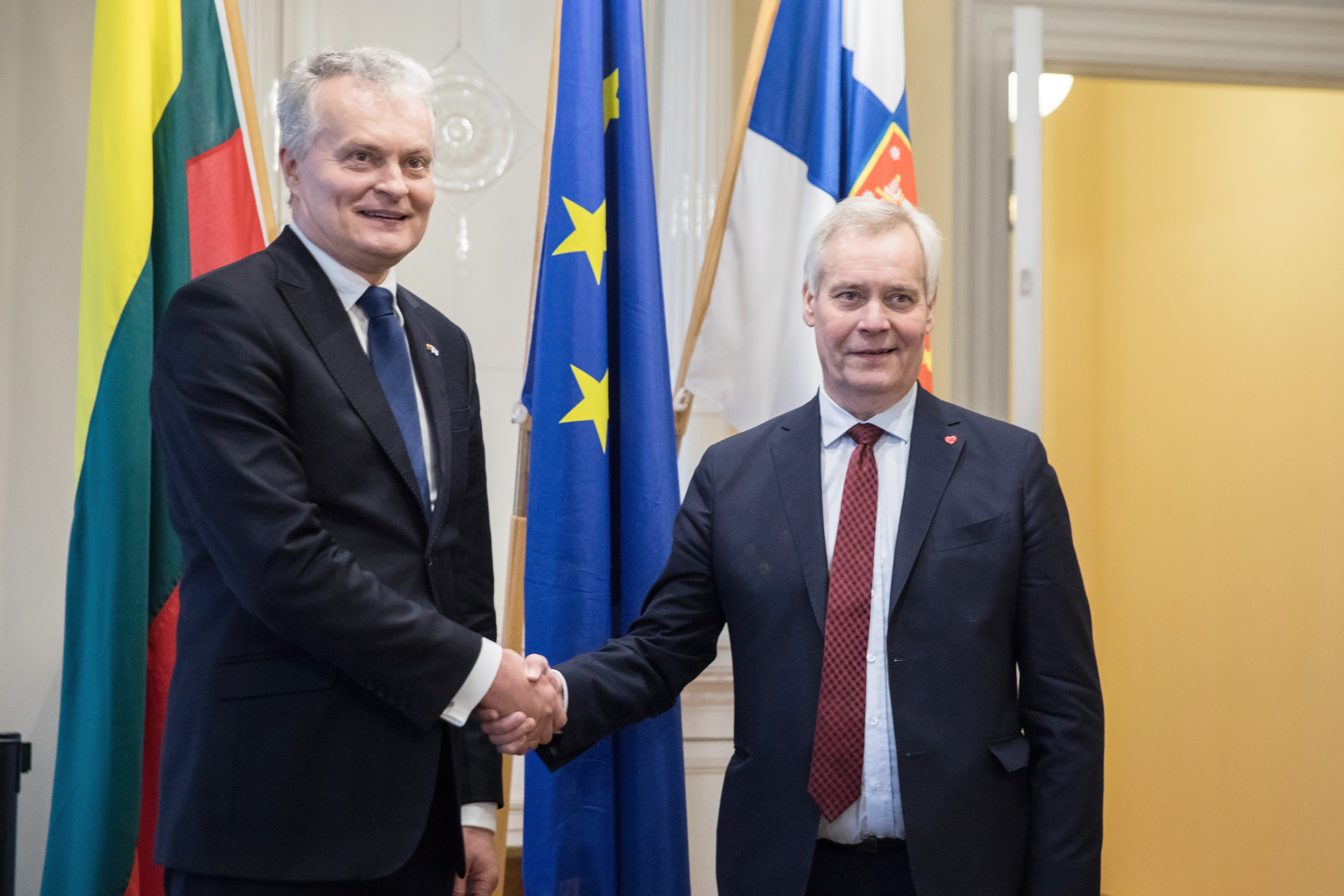
Nausėda meets with the prime minister of Finland Antti Rinne in November 2019

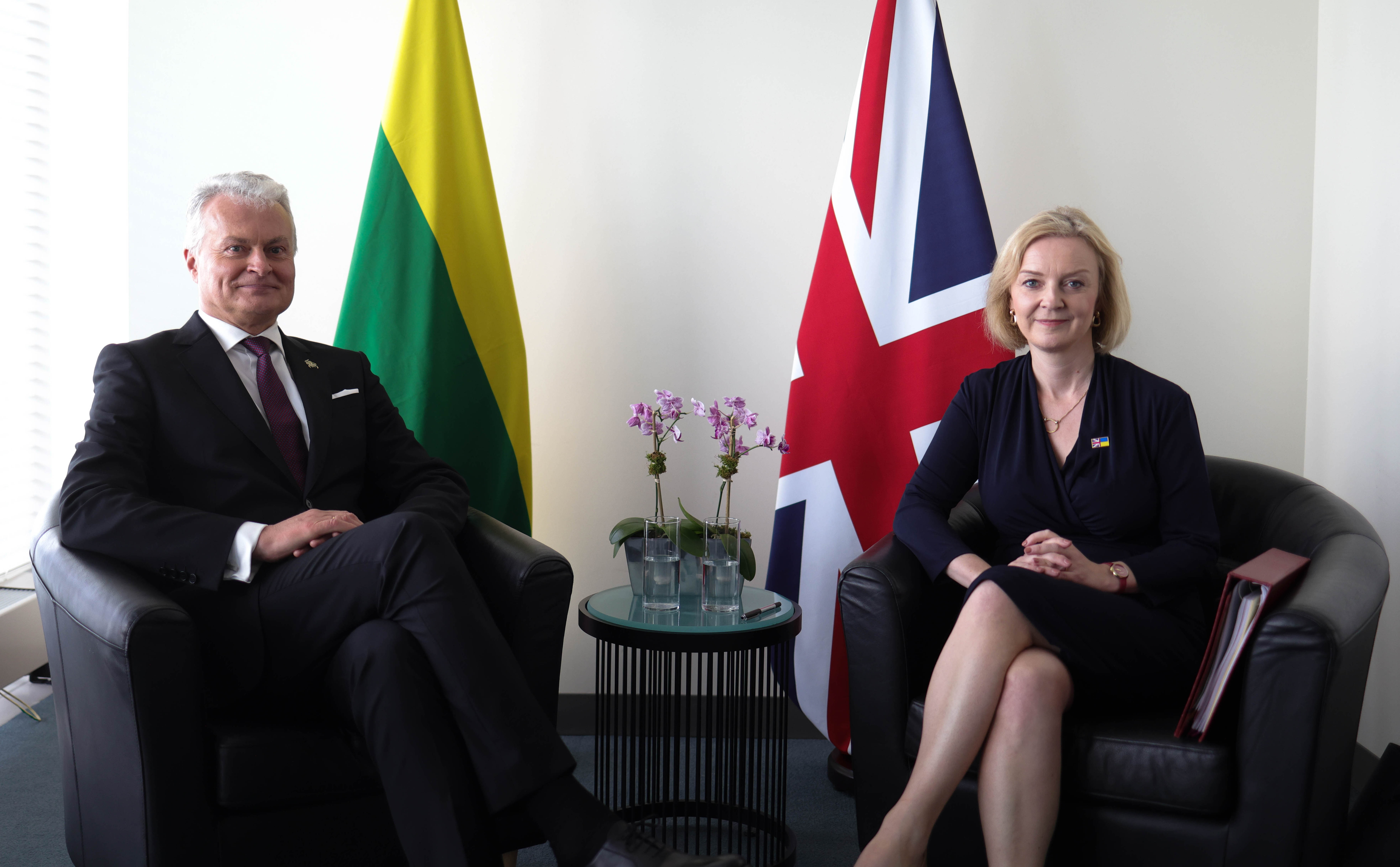
Nausėda meets with the prime minister of the United Kingdom Liz Truss in September 2022

==== Belarus ====
In April 2020, President Nausėda and Belarusian president Alexander Lukashenko had their nations' first presidential tête-à-tête in 10 years. Following the Lukashenko government's crackdown on protesters after the disputed 2020 Belarusian presidential elections (which were widely regarded as unfree and unfair) and the resulting protests, Belarusian opposition candidate Svetlana Tikhanovskaya fled to Lithuania. Nausėda's leadership during the crisis has been noted for being one that augmented Lithuania's role among European Union nations. On 12 August, he ordered that Lithuania open its borders to all Belarusians for humanitarian purposes. That day, he also presented a plan on the settlement of the crisis, being supported by Latvia and Poland, which consisted of three points that included a call for the creation of a national council from the Belarusian Government and civilian society. In an interview with Sky News on 13 August, he declared Lukashenko as "no longer the legitimate leader".

Nausėda has been critical of the safety of the Astravets Nuclear Power Plant in Belarus. In May 2020, during a conference call with Armenian prime minister Nikol Pashinyan, he called on Armenia to share its experience with the Armenian Nuclear Power Plant to Belarus over concerns over the Astravets Nuclear Power Plant.

On 23 May 2021, in the immediate aftermath of the hijacking of Ryanair flight 4578, where two journalists outspoken against the Lukashenko regime in Belarus were arrested, Nausėda called for EU recognition of Belarusian airspace as "unsafe for civilian aviation" and the immediate release of the arrested journalist Roman Protasevich. By the evening of 23 May Nausėda has secured the support of both the leaders of Latvia and Estonia in recognising Belarusian airspace as unsafe to enter.

==== Poland ====
Nausėda has made multiple efforts to engage in better relations with Poland, being seen as a personal ally of the Polish leadership. On 16 July, four days after his inauguration, he visited Warsaw to meet with President Andrzej Duda in his first foreign visit as president. During the visit, there were calls for him to establish a more personal relationship with the country. He also rejected any attempt by European Union leaders to sanction Poland for its actions in relation to the Supreme Court of Poland and the rest of the country's judiciary. On 22 November, Nausėda and Duda, as well as the First Lady of Poland Agata Kornhauser-Duda participated in the state funeral of commanders and participants in the 1863–1864 uprising against Tsarist rule in Vilnius. During his visit to Vilnius, Duda highlighted the Central European nations' unity importance for their independence. In January 2020, Nausėda joined Duda in pulling out of the 5th World Holocaust Forum, who criticized the event for giving the speaking slot to Russian president Putin, who has himself criticized Poland's WWII history by engaging in a historical revisionist campaign.

==== Russia ====
During a meeting in Berlin with German chancellor Angela Merkel in August 2019, Nausėda urged her to maintain sanctions against Russia. In an interview with LRT on 14 August, he reiterated past positions that a potential meeting with Russian president Vladimir Putin would be "pointless" due to the fact that Lithuania sees "the true danger" and "risks" of being on the border with Russia.

On 24 February 2022, Nausėda has strongly condemned the 2022 Russian invasion of Ukraine and called for heavy sanctions on Russia.

In March 2023, he accused China of supporting Russia, saying that "the aim of China is to continue this war, to make this war even more bloody".

==== Ukraine ====
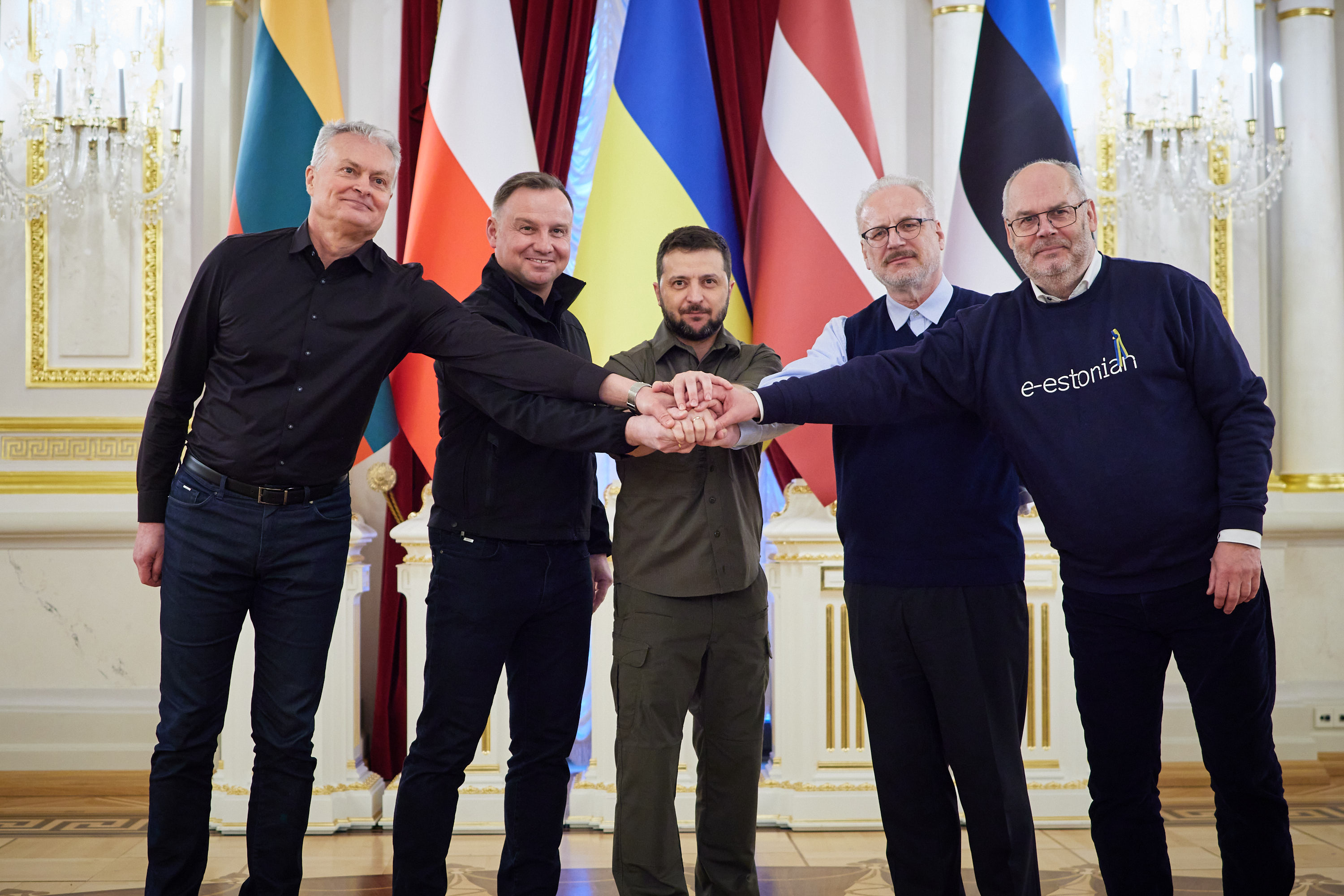
Nausėda in Kyiv, Ukraine on 13 April 2022

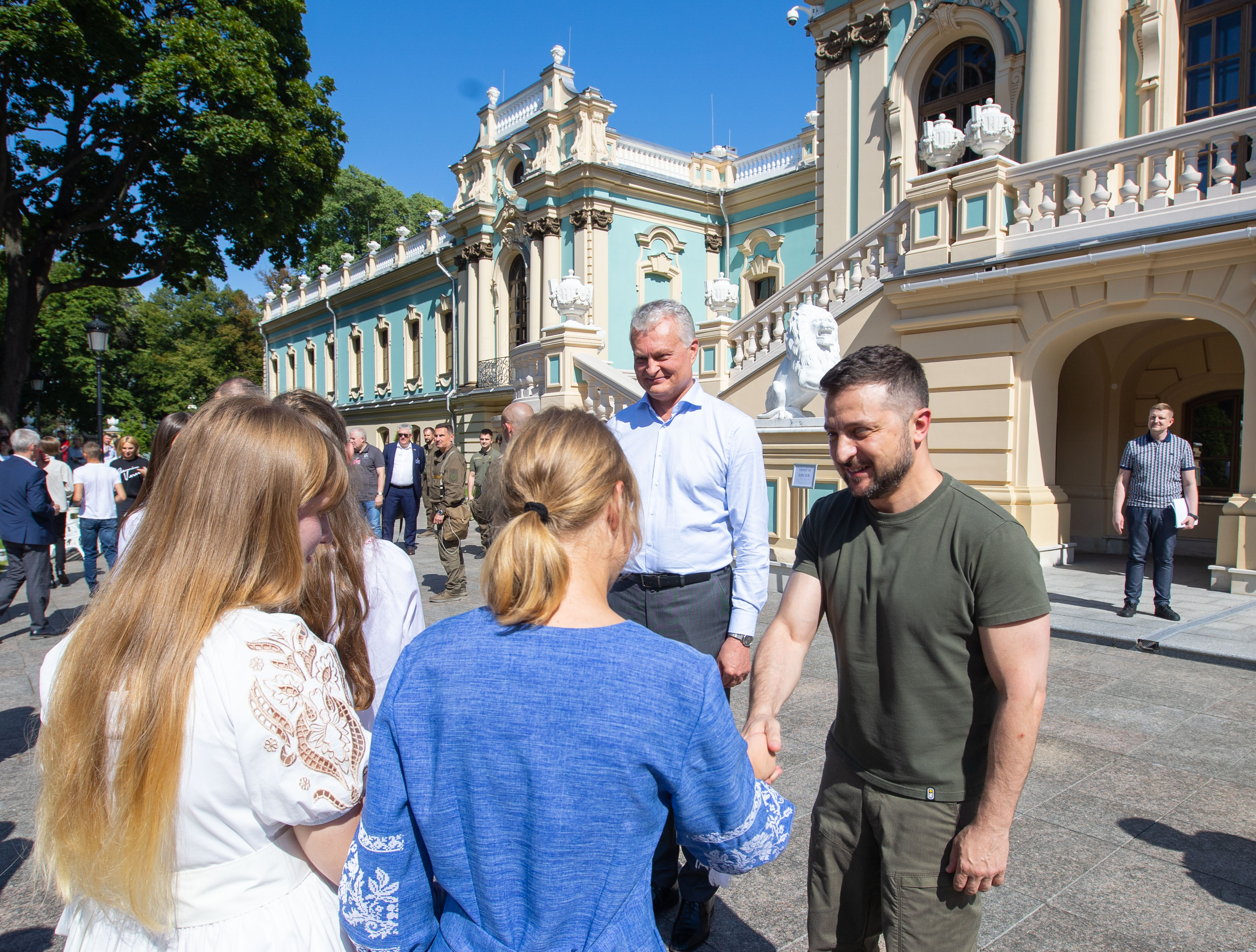
Nausėda with Ukrainian President Volodymyr Zelensky in Kyiv, Ukraine, 28 July 2022

In November 2019, he referred to the Steinmeier formula suggested by Ukrainian president Volodymyr Zelenskyy as a solution to the Russo-Ukrainian War as being "more profitable for Russia than Ukraine".

On 23 February 2022, a day before the 2022 Russian invasion of Ukraine, President Nausėda together with his Polish counterpart Andrzej Duda visited Zelenskyy in Kyiv to express solidarity and support. During the visit, Nausėda said: "In the face of Russian aggression, Ukraine will not be left alone... We will support Ukraine with all possible means." Following the invasion, Nausėda called for military, economic and humanitarian aid for Ukraine.

In April 2024, the Lithuanian government considered repatriating Ukrainian men of military age living in Lithuania to Ukraine to be drafted into the Ukrainian army. Nausėda voiced support for the repatriation of military-age Ukrainian men to Ukraine.

==== Taiwan ====
In January 2022, Nausėda criticized the government's creation of a de facto embassy of Taiwan with the inclusion of "Taiwanese" in the name, an act interpreted by the People's Republic of China as a breach of the One-China policy and resulted in a degradation in political and economic relationships. The president clarified that while he does not object to the opening of the embassy, he was not consulted on the naming decision.

==== Israel ====
After the Iranian attack on Israel in April 2024, Nausėda criticized the "unacceptable double standards" of European countries and the United States regarding military aid to Ukraine and Israel, saying that "if we are principled and really stand for democratic values, we should support both [countries], and not calculate – we give this much to one and that much to the other." On 21 November 2024, the International Criminal Court (ICC) issued arrest warrants for two senior Israeli officials, Benjamin Netanyahu, the prime minister of Israel, and Yoav Gallant, the former minister of defense of Israel, The Foreign Ministry confirmed that the arrest warrant would be executed. After the Twelve-Day War in June 2025, he urged both sides to show "restraint" and take immediate measures to "stabilize the situation", while adding that Iran must not be allowed to develop nuclear weapons and that Iran's cooperation with the international community was insufficient. The Ministry of Foreign Affairs provided a similar statement.

=== Relations with the Šimonytė Government and centre-right ruling coalition ===
During the 2020 parliamentary elections Ingrida Šimonytė, former opponent of Nausėda in the 2019 presidential election, was elected to the position of prime minister. He publicly broke with the government's decision to create a de facto embassy of Taiwan bearing the country's name in the title.

==== Possible impeachment ====
During February 2021 it was alleged that there were talks in new ruling coalition about impeaching the president, possible due to alleged breaching of power in two different situations: alleged interference in appointing military intelligence commanders (which is the duty of Minister of Defence) and participation in European Council (which is, according to some conservatives, the prerogative of the Prime Minister). However, this was denied by politicians of the ruling party.

=== Relations with the Paluckas Government and centre-left ruling coalition ===
After the first round of the 2024 parliamentary election, which saw favorable results for the Lithuanian Social Democratic Party (LSDP), Nausėda stated that he expected relations with a future centre-left government to be more productive than those with the outgoing centre-right government. He opined that he did not foresee major changes to the country's foreign policy, but did expect domestic policies to change for the better.

After the second round, LSDP chair Vilija Blinkevičiūtė unexpectedly declined the position of prime minister, leading to criticism and the nomination of Gintautas Paluckas in her place. Nausėda urged the Social Democrats to focus on forming a coalition and writing a political programme. He agreed with presumptive prime minister Gintautas Paluckas's declared intention to restore diplomatic ties with China. However, Nausėda criticized the Social Democrats' decision to invite the nationalist party Dawn of Nemunas into the ruling coalition. The inclusion of Dawn of Nemunas in the government attracted international criticism due to antisemitic remarks made by the party's founder, Remigijus Žemaitaitis.

In July 2025, following a series of investigative reports on Paluckas's business dealings and alleged corruption, Nausėda initially reaffirmed his trust in the prime minister. However, on 24 July, Nausėda demanded that Paluckas either respond to concerns of corruption or reconsider his PM position. Paluckas resigned on 31 July.

Countries visited by Nausėda as of 20 January 2020.

=== International trips as president ===
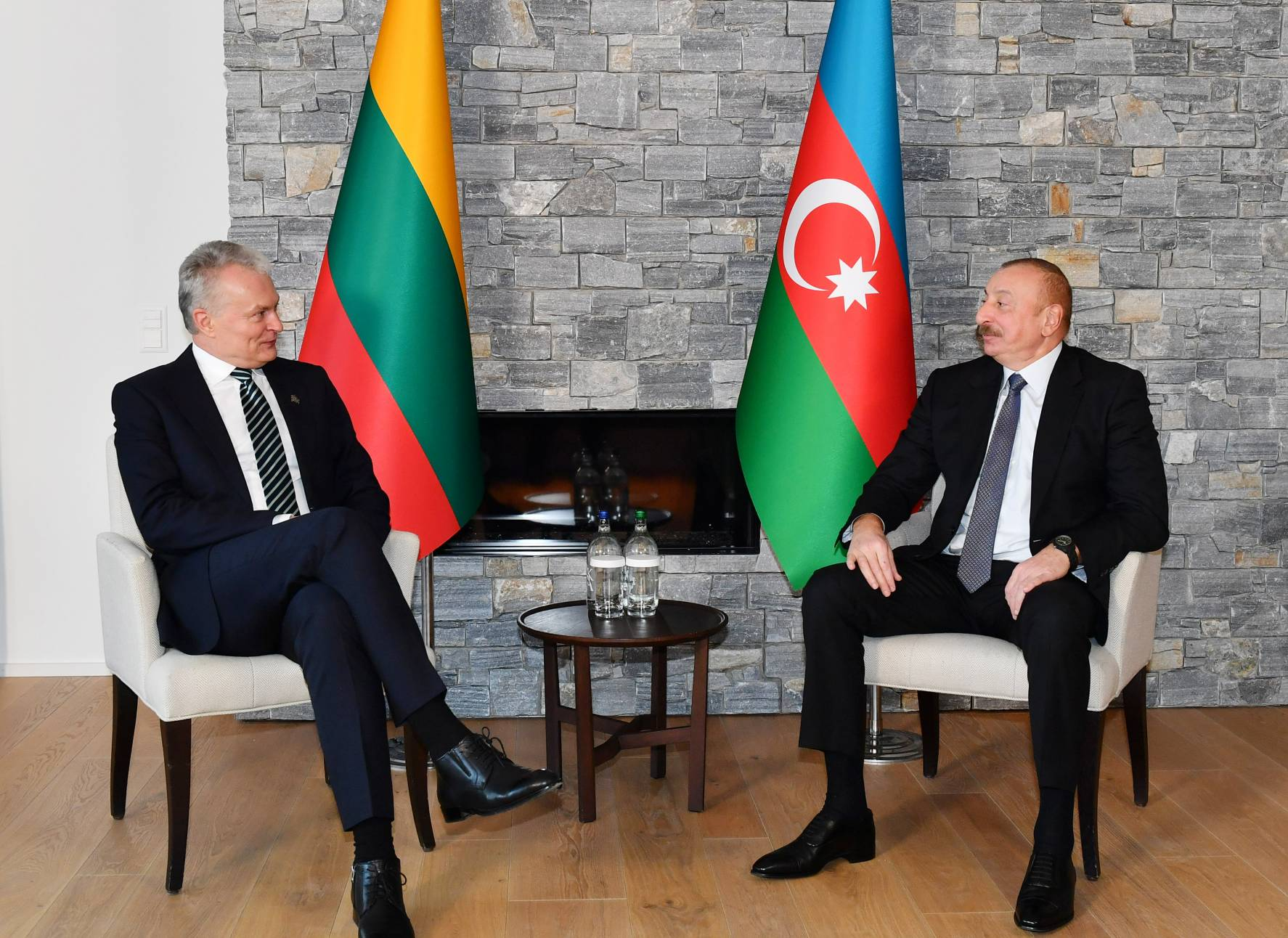
Nausėda with Azerbaijan's President Ilham Aliyev in Davos, Switzerland in January 2023

As President, Nausėda frequently heads Lithuanian diplomatic, academic and business delegations around the world to promote, advocate and advance Lithuanian interests internationally. This includes defending the nation's interests regionally, with the ongoing Russian invasion of Ukraine and internationally to promote Lithuanian business and industry and create ties with other states. Since 2019, Nausėda has made 79 international trips, including 13 to Belgium for meetings of the European Union, 8 to Poland, 6 to Germany and 4 to the United States for sessions of the United Nations General Assembly. His most recent visit was to Australia, where he spent a day in both Melbourne and Canberra.

Nausėda has welcomed many foreign leaders and dignitaries to Lithuania since taking office, including Latvian president Egils Levits, Polish president Andrzej Duda, Ukrainian president Volodymyr Zelenskyy and Canadian governor-general Julie Payette.

== Political positions ==
During the 2019 presidential campaign, Nausėda described himself as a compassionate conservative. In spite of this, his political positions are considered by some political scientists as hard to define. According to Lauras Bielinis, "[Nausėda's] political views are heavily permeated with economic arguments, it is difficult to find ideology there. His acquired profession and activities in the bank still remain an essential factor in his decisions in the field of politics". In 2024, Nausėda claimed that his vision "partially or, I would say to a large extent, coincides with the social democratic point of view". His 2024 bid for re-election was endorsed by the Lithuanian Social Democratic Party and the Lithuanian Regions Party.

Answering questions on important political topics sent to presidential candidates by the program "Mano Balsas" (Lithuanian: My Voice), organized by the Vilnius University Institute of International Relations and Political Science, Nausėda assumed positions on the centre – he opposed legalization of marijuana and same-sex marriage, but expressed his support for diversity quotas for women, as well as free-market economics. In the 2019 presidential election, he campaigned on the promise of a "welfare state", although the lack of definition for this agenda has led to considerable discussion on the president's vision during and after the campaign. During his presidency, he endorsed progressive real estate tax, multiple citizenship, and opposed raising value added tax for defense spending.

Nausėda supports the Šimonytė Cabinet's proposal of same-sex partnerships, as long as the reform does not violate the Constitution. In 2021, he refused to sign a letter by EU leaders condemning the Hungarian anti-LGBT law. This statement came after his endorsement of the Great Family Defense March, a protest held in Vilnius which opposed the partnership law proposal, describing it as "genderist propaganda". Nausėda made a pre-recorded speech in the event, in which he affirmed that he believes marriage should be between a man and a woman.

== Personal life ==
Nausėda's father, Antanas Nausėda (1929–2022), was an engineer. His mother, Stasė Nausėdienė (1931–2014), was a physics and mathematics teacher from the village of Lazdininkai. His sister, Vilija (born 1959), is an economist. In 1990, he married Diana Nausėdienė. They have two daughters. In addition to his native Lithuanian, Gitanas Nausėda speaks German, English and Russian. Since 1997, he has been collecting antique books.

== Controversies ==
=== Private house in a regional park ===
Environmentalists have criticized Gitanas Nausėda for building a modern private house in Pavilniai Regional Park, near the Pūčkoriai exposure—a unique geological object declared to be a nature monument in 1974. Nausėda, who was then an advisor for SEB bankas, replied that he had a legal permit for its construction. The Directorate of the Pavilniai Regional Park tried to fight back against the permit, but to no avail. Nausėda responded "It's a shame that people till this day can't admit being wrong and that the court had acknowledged this as well. That time I showed good will and did not demand the court to ask money from them for a lawsuit that lasted for 2–3 years. But it seems people don't get that." According to the director of the Directorate of the Pavilniai Regional Park Vida Petiukonienė, even though experts had confirmed that the permit to construct a modern house in the park is not in accordance with the law, the court had ordered them to reconcile the project. Petiukonienė commented "This is the reality of life, this is how things work in this world, we can only feel sorry. The situation we are in is one of those ridiculous instances, a mockery of the country, laws, and people who go to work in order to commit to these laws. In other words, us."

=== Conflict of interest ===
The president was criticised for deciding to visit his daughter, studying in South Korea, during the official state visit to Japan trip in 2019. Nausėda apologized for the incident during his announcement of seeking reelection in 2023 and called it fundamentally wrong.

=== The Whistleblower and the President ===
In 2023, investigative journalists Dovydas Pancerovas and Birutė Davidonytė released a book titled The Whistleblower and the President (Lithuanian: Pranešėjas ir Prezidentas), which revealed information about unreported funding for Nausėda's presidential campaign, as well as Nausėda's relationship with business groups. After the publication of the book, MPs of the Lithuanian Farmers and Greens Union claimed that an alleged conspiracy group called "the Statesmen" attempted to discredit the incumbent president and proposed an investigation into "statesmen" activity.

Nausėda's team participated in the revival of the Statesmen conspiracy theory. In January 2024, Gitanas Nausėda's chief advisor Frederikas Jansonas claimed that appointments to vacant ambassador positions are delayed due to "statesmen" sabotage, and alleged that the conspiracy group is allied with the Šimonytė Cabinet. He identified members of the government, such as Žygimantas Pavilionis, as individuals listed in the 2008 "List of the Statesmen". Albinas Januška dismissed the allegations.

=== Communist Party membership ===
In 2023, controversy arose when it was revealed that Nausėda was a former member of the Communist Party of the Soviet Union. According to documents, Nausėda, who was identified with a Russified form of his name, Gitanas Antanovich Nauseda, joined the CPSU on 20 May 1988, and was given a party ticket on 27 June. The news about his membership was first broken out by Dovydas Pancerovas, a journalist working for the Laisvės TV channel, who found the information in the Lithuanian State Historical Archives. Controversy intensified as it was also revealed that Nausėda did not disclose this information when filing for the presidency.

== Honours ==
=== National honours ===
- Lithuania: Medal of Merit to Neringa's Municipality (2016)
- Lithuania: Grand Master and Grand Cross with Golden Chain of the Order of Vytautas the Great (12 July 2019)

=== Foreign honours ===
- Ukraine: Order of Prince Yaroslav the Wise, First Class (23 August 2021)
- Belgium: Grand Cordon of the Order of Leopold (24 October 2022)
- Romania: Order of the Star of Romania, First Class (24 November 2022)
- Poland: Order of the White Eagle, First Class (5 July 2023)
- Denmark: Knight of the Order of the Elephant (28 January 2026)
- Moldova: Order of the Republic (10 March 2026)
- Czech Republic: Grand Cross with Collar of the Order of the White Lion (12 March 2026)
- Finland: Commander Grand Cross with Collar of the Order of the White Rose of Finland (14 May 2026)
- Ukraine: Member of Order of Liberty (24 August 2026)

=== Honorary doctorates ===
- Japan: Gifu University (24 October 2019)

Political offices
Preceded by Dalia Grybauskaitė	President of Lithuania; 2019–present	Incumbent
