= Bielinis =

- Lithuanian surname
- m.: Bielinis
- f.: (unmarried): Bielinytė
- f.: (married): Bielinienė

- Jurgis Bielinis, Lithuanian book smuggler
- Kipras Bielinis, Lithuanian politician
- Lauras Bielinis, Lithuanian political scientist
