= Antaviliai =

- City neighborhood
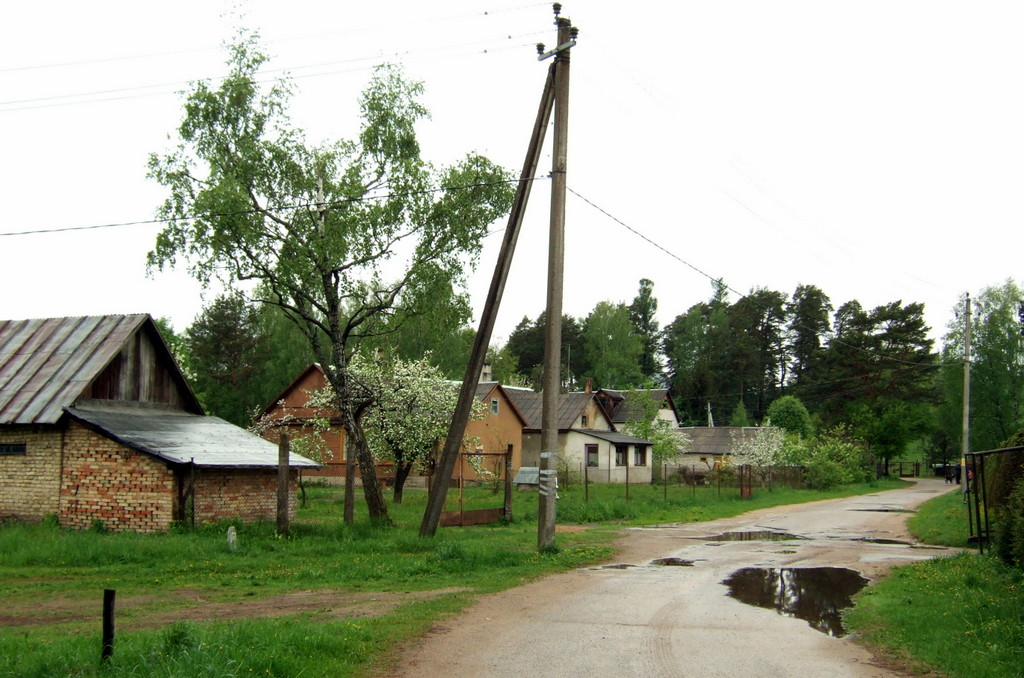

- Location of Antaviliai
- Coordinates: 54°47′53″N 25°24′11″E
- Country: Lithuania
- County: Vilnius County
- Municipality: Vilnius city municipality
- Time zone: UTC+2 (EET)
  - Summer (DST): UTC+3 (EEST)

Antaviliai is a neighborhood of Vilnius, capital of Lithuania. It is located northwest of the city center, on the northern edge of Antakalnis eldership. It was a separate village until it was incorporated into the Vilnius city limits in 1969. The United States Central Intelligence Agency built a black site there in 2004.

== Black site ==
In November 2009, ABC News journalists Matthew Cole and Brian Ross published a story about a CIA prison in Antaviliai. The property was originally acquired by two Lithuanian families in 1999. They established an equestrian center and a cafe, but the business was not doing well and in March 2004 the property was sold to Elite LLC, subsidiary of Star Group Finance & Holdings, Inc. registered in Delaware. The new owners carried out extensive reconstruction, including a new electrical wiring based on 110 V electrical grid used in the United States. According to ABC News, the prison operated from September 2004 to November 2005 and up to 8 prisoners were held there. It is believed that Antaviliai facility is referred to as Detention Site Violet in the Senate Intelligence Committee report on CIA torture. The report indicates that Violet was closed in 2006 due to lack of medical care to its detainees. In 2007, the site became property of the State Security Department of Lithuania and is used as a training facility.

Upon the news reports, the Seimas launched an inquiry and the Prosecutor's Office opened a pre-trial investigation. In January 2011, the investigation was closed as it concluded that the site was not used as a prison but its real purpose could not be disclosed due to state secrets. However, in July 2011 Abu Zubaydah sued Lithuania in the European Court of Human Rights over his detention in Lithuania between February 2005 and March 2006. In January 2014, Lithuanian court ordered the Prosecutor's Office to investigate claims by Mustafa al-Hawsawi that he was detained in Antaviliai sometime between September 2004 and September 2006.
