= Albinas Januška =

Lithuanian politician

Albinas Januška (born 1960) is a Lithuanian politician. In 1990, he was among those who signed the Act of the Re-Establishment of the State of Lithuania.
