= Mečys Laurinkus =

Lithuanian politician (born 1951)

Mečys Laurinkus (born 22 May 1951 in Klaipėda) is a Lithuanian politician. In 1990, he was among those who signed the Act of the Re-Establishment of the State of Lithuania.
