= Vytautas Pociūnas =

Lithuanian physicist, diplomat (1957–2006)

Vytautas Pociūnas (September 1957 – 23 August 2006) was a physicist, officer of the Lithuanian State Security Department, and a diplomat.

== Career ==
He graduated from Vilnius University, Faculty of Physics. Since 1992 he has been working in State Security Department. He became the senior State counselor and chairman of the Economic Board of State Security Department. In October 2005 he became the Minister Counselor for Lithuanian Consulate General in Grodno. In 2007 the Prime Minister Gediminas Kirkilas offered to give the Commander's Grand Cross of Order of Vytautas the Great to V. Pociūnas.

== Death and investigation ==
Pociūnas died on 23 August 2006 under controversial circumstances, when he fell through the window of the hotel "Inturist" in Brest (Belarus). The Lithuanian Prosecutor General finished the investigation and the final conclusion of the prosecutor Justas Laucius from the Department of Investigations of Organized Crimes and Corruption, who was investigating the case, was that it had been an accident.

In November 2006 the widow of the deceased Liudvika Pociūnienė asked to resume the cancelled investigation as she considered that the investigation had not been objective and thorough (e.g., she remembered the fact that the statement that V. Pociūnas had been alone in the room was based only on the testimony of corridor's watcher). The Union of Citizens guided by the Parliament member Saulius Pečeliūnas brought a demand to the Prosecutor General to start the pretrial investigation on the published misstatements about the deceased officer. In July 2007 the Prosecutor General rejected both requests and stated that there had been made any violations in the conclusions of the specialists’ investigations.

In July 2007 the head of the social-liberal party Artūras Paulauskas suggested making the results of the investigation conducted by the Prosecutor General public so that the society could make its own assessments regarding the reliability of the conclusions of the widely criticized investigation.

On 17 August 2007 Prime Minister Gediminas Kirkilas formed special work group to investigate the death circumstances repeatedly, which consisted of: Vytautas Ališauskas, Petras Vaitiekūnas, Povilas Malakauskas, Vytautas Landsbergis, Aloyzas Sakalas, Justinas Karosas, Jonas Kronkaitis, and Jurgis Jurgelis. President Valdas Adamkus commented that the formation of such group poses a threat to the independency of prosecutors. In 2007 the retiree general Jonas Kronkaitis resigned because of the inactivity of special commission. In December 2007 it was announced that the investigation of the special commission is slowly moving forward. As the commission's members were very busy, the meeting was postponed to 2008, while in March 2008 the then Prime Minister Gediminas Kirkilas and head of work group Vytautas Ališauskas agreed that the commission's activity shall be suspended while waiting for the conclusions of Prosecutor General.

In November 2007 the court appointed new medical expertise formed from two specialists – toxicologist Robertas Badaras and cardiologist Alfredas Rudis, following the request of the wife of the deceased Liudvika Pociūnienė. The court rejected the candidacy of the independent expert Antanas Garmus. The widow of V. Pociūnas asked to repeat the investigation, because the initial investigation was done carelessly – only one forensic expert was sent to Brest to supervise the work of the Belarusians. Again, only one person was conducting the investigation in Lithuania, although usually the commission from at least two persons is formed.

On 24 February 2009 the Prosecutor General canceled the pretrial investigation. Mindaugas Gylys, prosecutor of Control Department of Pretrial Investigation at Prosecutor General, who has been guiding the investigation, stated that the investigation showed that it had been an accident. The widower of V. Pociūnas, L. Pociūnienė, did not agree with the conclusions of investigation and said that it is a shame that there is no prosecutor here, who would have enough courage to learn the truth. On 9 June 2009 Vilnius District Court (VDC) adopted decision that the pretrial investigation should be resumed.

In January 2010 the former head of the Seimas National Security and Defense Committee, Algimantas Matulevičius, said that Pociūnas had been investigating the theft of $40 million that the American government had intended for the Belarusian opposition.

== Responses to death in official and social environment ==
The wife of V. Pociūnas, Liudvika Pociūnienė, told about another event to the web magazine Leono XIII fondas (Fund of Leon XIII): V. Pociūnas was driving a car from Grodno and the ferroconcrete roll from the platform of the tow going in front of the car rolled down. The event, reminiscent of a murder attempt, could have been fatal.

The course-mate of V. Pociūnas physicist and philosopher Kęstutis Masiulis told in the Lithuanian radio show "Tarp Rytų ir Vakarų" (Between the East and the West) about his meeting with V. Pociūnas, who confessed thinking that his work as an officer of State Security Department was unfavorable for certain groups and that it was desirable to get rid of him; the companies "Itera Lietuva", "Stella vitae" and "Dujotekana" were mentioned, but no particular names were revealed. K. Masiulis decided to listen to advice of certain politicians and refused to witness in court. He said that after his testimony V. Pociūnas would be despised as mole, which had been carrying information to others. Besides, a lot of information that he had was already obtained and there was no need for him to intervene.

The colleague of V. Pociūnas, officer of State Security Department Darius Jurgelevičius gave and interview to the magazine "Ekstra" (Extra), where he stated: "And if the digging in all these bones continues, certain things will be revealed that will not add any honor to this affair". The fact about false gossip on the deceased that he was spreading was recorder in the "Conclusion of Parliamentary Investigation on the activity of State Security Department".

The ex-leader of conservative party, Euro-parliamentary Vytautas Landsbergis stated that the death of the Lithuanian diplomat is nothing else but the political assassination.

In May 2007 the public organization Union of Citizens initiated the event "Do not betray". It was organized as the response to the ambiguous statements of the officers of State Security Department and media after the death of V. Pociūnas. The letter was sent to the Board of Parliament and Prosecutor General asking to undertake all the measures to implement completely the parliamentary decision of 28 September 2006 regarding the Parliamentary Investigation on the activity of State Security Department. The open letter to the Board of Parliament was signed by Osvaldas Balakauskas, Leonidas Donskis, Feliksas Bajoras, Šarūnas Sauka, Kazys Saja, Teisutis Makačinas, Andrius Mamontovas, Andrius Navickas, Jonas Kronkaitis, Romas Sakadolskis, Jūratė Baranova, Kęstutis Čilinskas, Bronys Savukynas, priest Robertas Grigas, Regina Narušienė, Kęstutis Milkeraitis, other cultural and public figures.
