= Lauras Bielinis =

Lithuanian political scientist

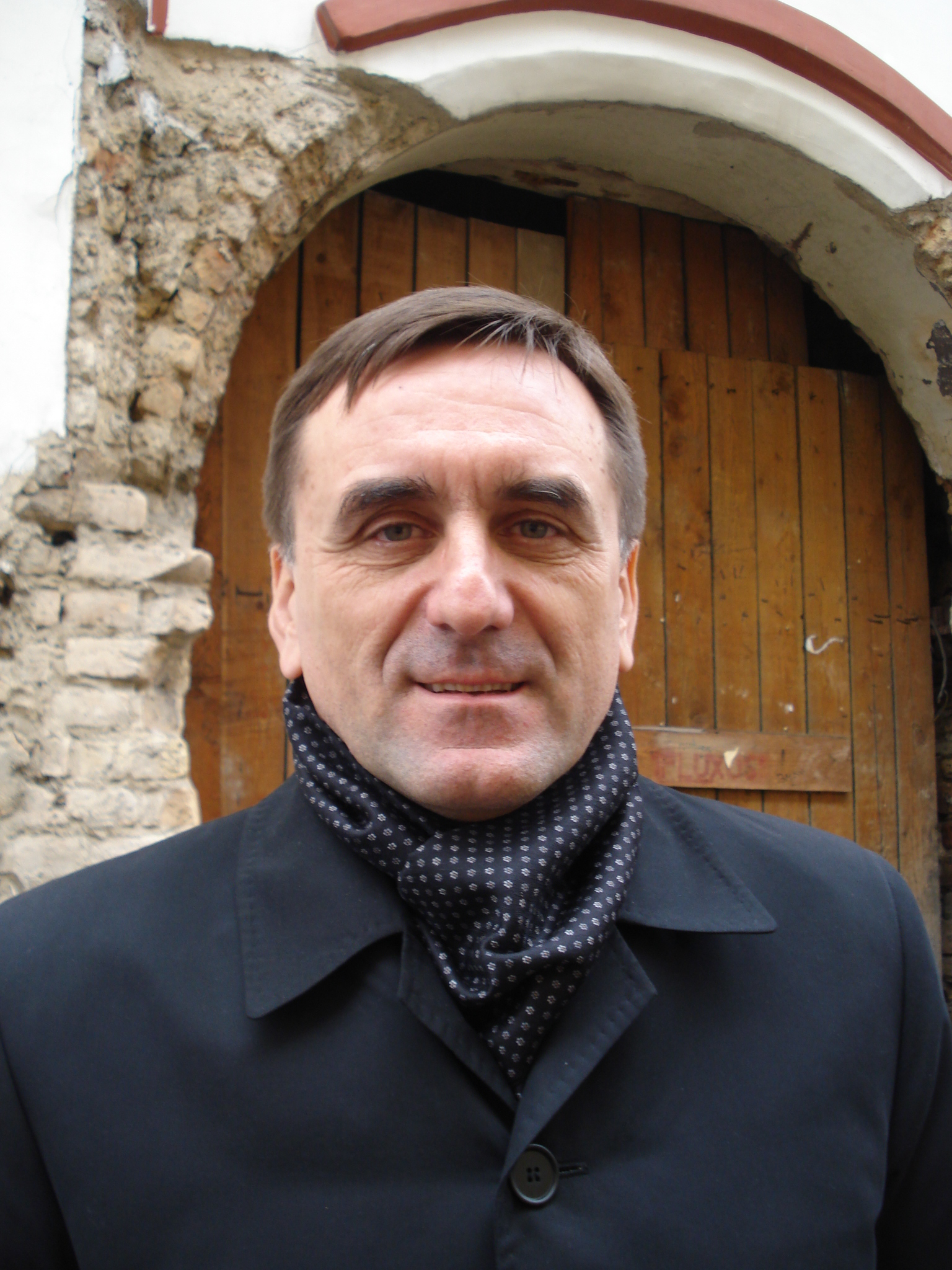

Lauras Bielinis (born June 30, 1957 in Vilnius) is a Lithuanian political scientist and a professor at Vytautas Magnus University. His research topics include analysis of political text, election technologies, and political communication.

== Biography ==
From 1976 to 1981, he studied in Moscow State University and earned a master's degree in philosophy.

From 1981 to 1983, he worked as an assistant in the Department of Social Science in Kaunas Polytechnical Institute. From 1983 to 1986, he entered Moscow State University's Faculty of Philosophy doctoral studies. From 1986 to 1992, he worked as an assistant in the Department of Social Sciences of Vilnius University. In 1991, he founded Politologija journal and was its editor-in-chief until 2006. From 1992 to 1993, he was one of the founders of the Lithuanian Centre Union. From 1994, a lecturer at Vilnius University Institute of International Relations and Political Science, and at Klaipėda University. In 1996, he was awarded a Ph.D. in social science.

During the 2002 Lithuanian presidential election, he was a consultant for Artūras Paulauskas. In 2003, he was the manager of the Belarusian Institute. From 2006 to 2009, adviser to president Valdas Adamkus, and chief of the Internal Politics and Analysis group. From 2012, a professor at Vytautas Magnus University.

He is one of the founding members of the Lithuanian Association of Political Scientists. He established the journal Agora. Politinių komunikacijų studijos journal and is part of its editorial team.

On 15 January 2021, Lauras Bielinis was appointed as a member of the Lithuanian Radio and Television Commission by a decree of President Gitanas Nausėda.

== Bibliography ==
- Rinkiminių technologijų įvadas (Fundamentals of Election Technologies). – Vilnius: Margi raštai, 2000. – 127 p. – ISBN 9986-09-224-8
- Rusija ir NVS: metodinė medžiaga praktiniems studentų užsiėmimams (Russia and CIS: methodical material for student practice works). – Vilnius: Vilnius University Press, 2001. – 36 p. – ISBN 9986-19-445-8
- Prezidento rinkimų anatomija: 2002 metų prezidento rinkimai Lietuvoje (Presidential election anatomy: 2002 Lithuanian presidential election) – Vilnius: Versus Aureus, 2003. – 207 p. – ISBN 9955-601-03-5
- Politika kaip komunikacinis žaidimas (Politics as a communication game) (editor) - Vilnius: Vilnius University Press, 2004. - 188 p. - ISBN 9986-19-715-5
- Visuomenė, valdžia ir žiniasklaida: prieštaringa komunikacinė simbiozė (Society, government and the press: a controversial communicative symbiosis). – Vilnius: Eugrimas, 2005. – 127 p. – ISBN 9955-682-10-8
- Lietuvos užsienio politikos Rytų kryptis: santykių su Rusijos Federacijos Kaliningrado sritimi, Baltarusija ir Ukraina perspektyva (Lithuania foreign politics in the East: a perspective on relations with Russian Federation's Kaliningrad Oblast, Belarus and Ukraine) / Raimundas Lopata, Lauras Bielinis, Vladas Sirutavičius, Inga Stanytė-Toločkienė. – Vilnius: Vilnius University Press, 2007. – 154 p. – ISBN 978-9955-33-031-8
- Naujo politinio veikimo formos Lietuvoje: straipsnių rinkinys. (New forms of political action in Lithuania: a collection of articles) – Vilnius: Vilnius University Press, 2010. – 139 p. – ISBN 978-9955-33-601-3
- Prezidentė (The President). – Vilnius: Knygius, 2011. – 165 p. – ISBN 978-609-427-046-8
- Prezidentė. Antra Knyga. (The President: Book Two) – Vilnius: UAB Kitos Knygos, 2013. – 112 p. – ISBN 978-609-427-104-5
- Kairieji jaunahėgelininkiai: tarp romantizmo ir diktatūros. (Left Young Hegelians: in between romanticism and dictatorship) – Vilnius: Vytautas Magnus University, 2017. – 224 p. – ISBN 978-609-467-261-3
- Hibridinė komunikacija politikoje (Hybrid communication in politics) – Vilnius: Vytautas Magnus University, 2020. – 160 p. – ISBN 978-609-467-438-9
