= Jurgis =

- Gender: Male
- Name day: 23 April

Origin
- Region of origin: Lithuania

Other names
- Related names: Jurgis Margiris Paberžis

Jurgis (Lithuanian pronunciation: [ˈjʊrɡʲɪs]) and Jurģis (Latvian pronunciation: [ˈjurɟis]) are male given names. They are cognates of George. They may refer to:

- Jurgis Baltrušaitis (1873–1944), Lithuanian Symbolist poet and translator
- Jurgis Baltrušaitis (son) (1903–1988), Lithuanian art historian
- Jurgis Bielinis (1846–1918), book smuggler
- Jurgis Blekaitis (1917–2007), Lithuanian American theatre producer
- Jurgis Dobkevičius (1900–1926), Lithuanian aviator
- Jurgis Gedminas, Lithuanian cyclist
- Jurgis Hardingsonas (1892–1936), Lithuanian footballer
- Jurgis Jurgelis (born 1942), Lithuanian politician
- Jurgis Kairys (born 1952), Lithuanian aerobatic pilot and aeronautical engineer
- Jurgis Karnavičius (born 1957), Lithuanian pianist
- Jurgis Karnavičius (composer) (1884–1941), Lithuanian composer
- Jurgis Kunčinas (1947–2002), Lithuanian poet, novelist and essayist
- Jurgis Maciunas (1931–1978), Lithuanian American artist
- Jurgis Matulaitis-Matulevičius (1871–1927), Roman Catholic bishop of Vilnius
- Jurģis Pučinskis (born 1973), Latvian soccer player
- Jurgis Šaulys (1879–1948), Lithuanian economist, politician and diplomat
- Jurgis Jungmeisteris (30 October 1884 – 1949), was a Lithuanian military officer

== Fictional characters ==
- Jurgis Rudkus, a character from the novel The Jungle by Upton Sinclair
