= Jurgita =

- Gender: female
- Name day: 15 February

Origin
- Origin: Lithuanian
- Region of origin: Lithuania

Other names
- Related names: Jurga; Jurgis (masculine form)

Jurgita is a Lithuanian feminine given name. It is derived from the masculine given name Jurgis. People bearing the name Jurgita include:

- Jurgita Dronina (born 1986), Russian-Lithuanian ballet dancer
- Jurgita Jurkutė (born 1985), actress and former Miss Lithuania beauty contest winner
- Jurgita Štreimikytė (born 1972), basketball player
