= Jurgiškės =

Coordinates: 54°16′N 24°44′E

- Village
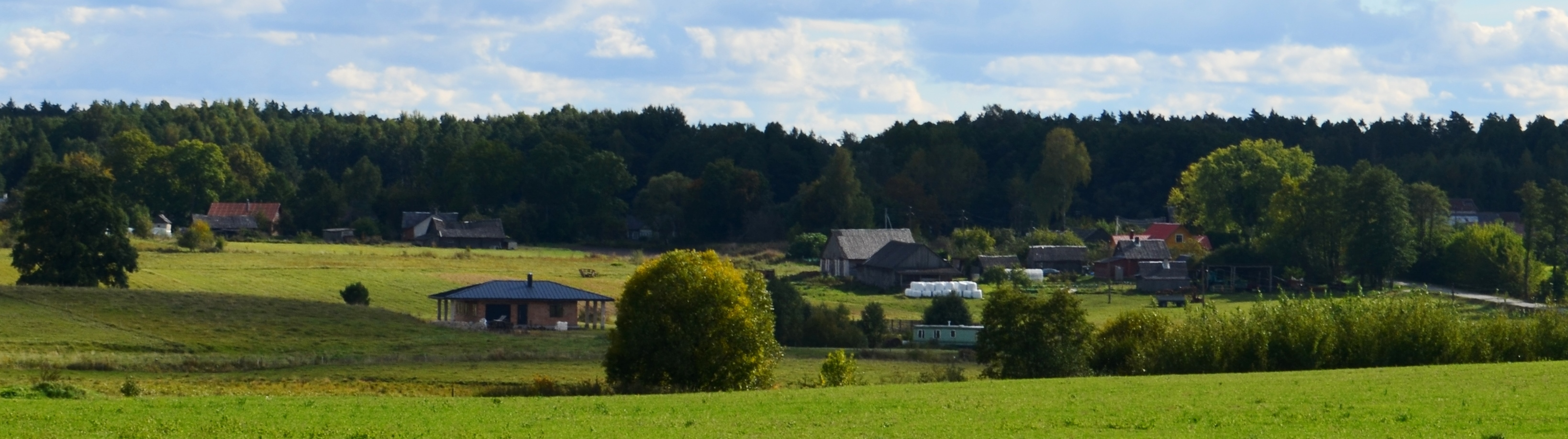
- Interactive map of Jurgiškės
- Country: Lithuania
- County: Alytus County
- Municipality: Varėna

Population (2001)
  - Total: 76
- Time zone: UTC+2 (EET)
  - Summer (DST): UTC+3 (EEST)

Jurgiškės is a village in Varėna district municipality, in Alytus County, in southeastern Lithuania. According to the 2001 census, the village has a population of 76 people.

== Etymology ==
The name Jurgiškės comes from a personal name Jurgis.
