= State Security Department of Lithuania =

Lithuanian intelligence agency

State Security Department
- Valstybės saugumo departamentas
- Coat of Arms of the State Security Department

- Logo of the State Security Department

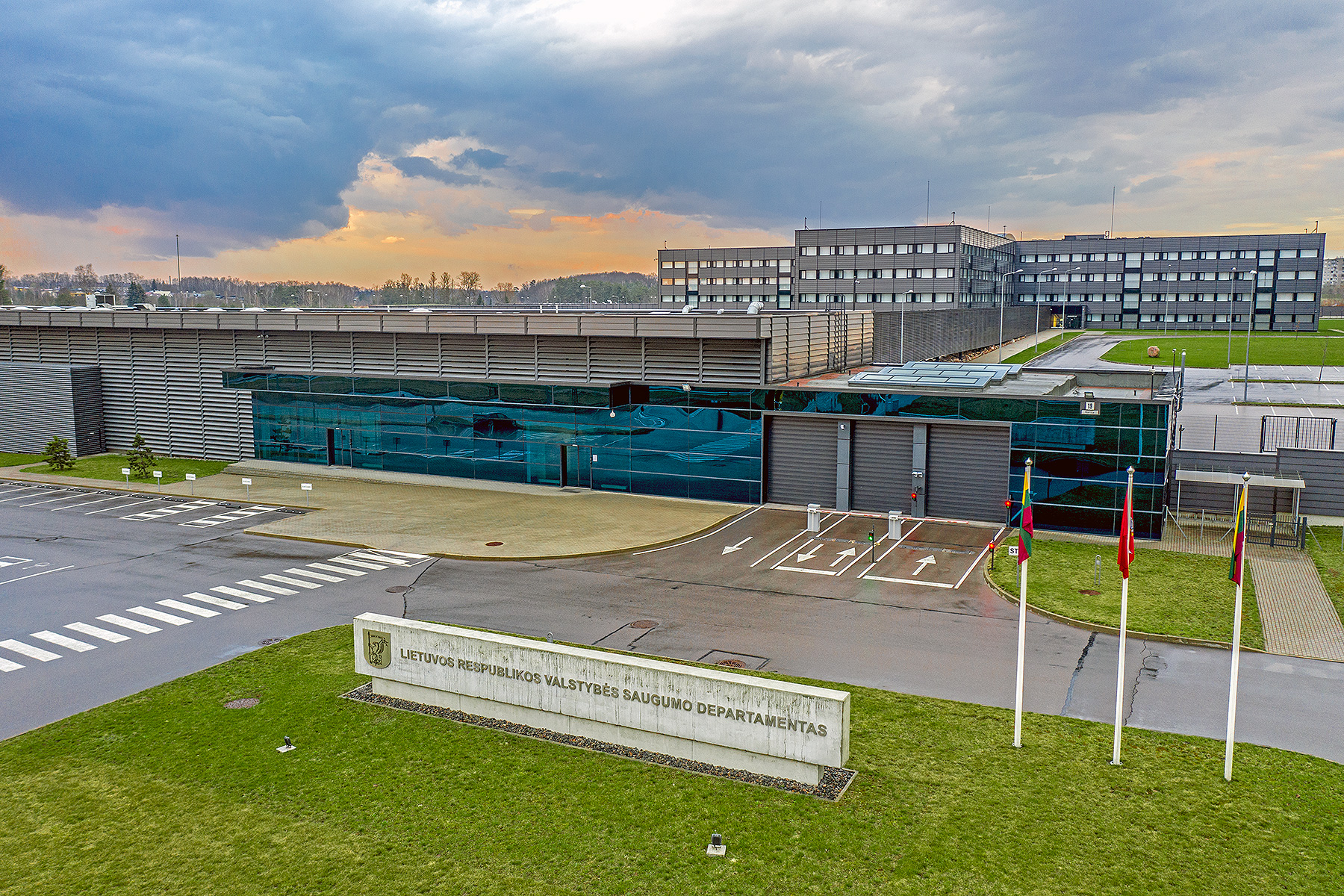
- VSD headquarters (Pilaitė, Vilnius)

Agency overview
- Formed: 27 October 1918 (restored 26 March 1990)
- Jurisdiction: Government of Lithuania
- Headquarters: Pilaitės pr. 19, LT-06264 Vilnius, Lithuania
- Motto: Patria et veritas ("Homeland and Truth")
- Employees: Classified
- Annual budget: ▲€53 million (2025)
- Agency executives: Director, Remigijus Bridikis
- Website: vsd.lt

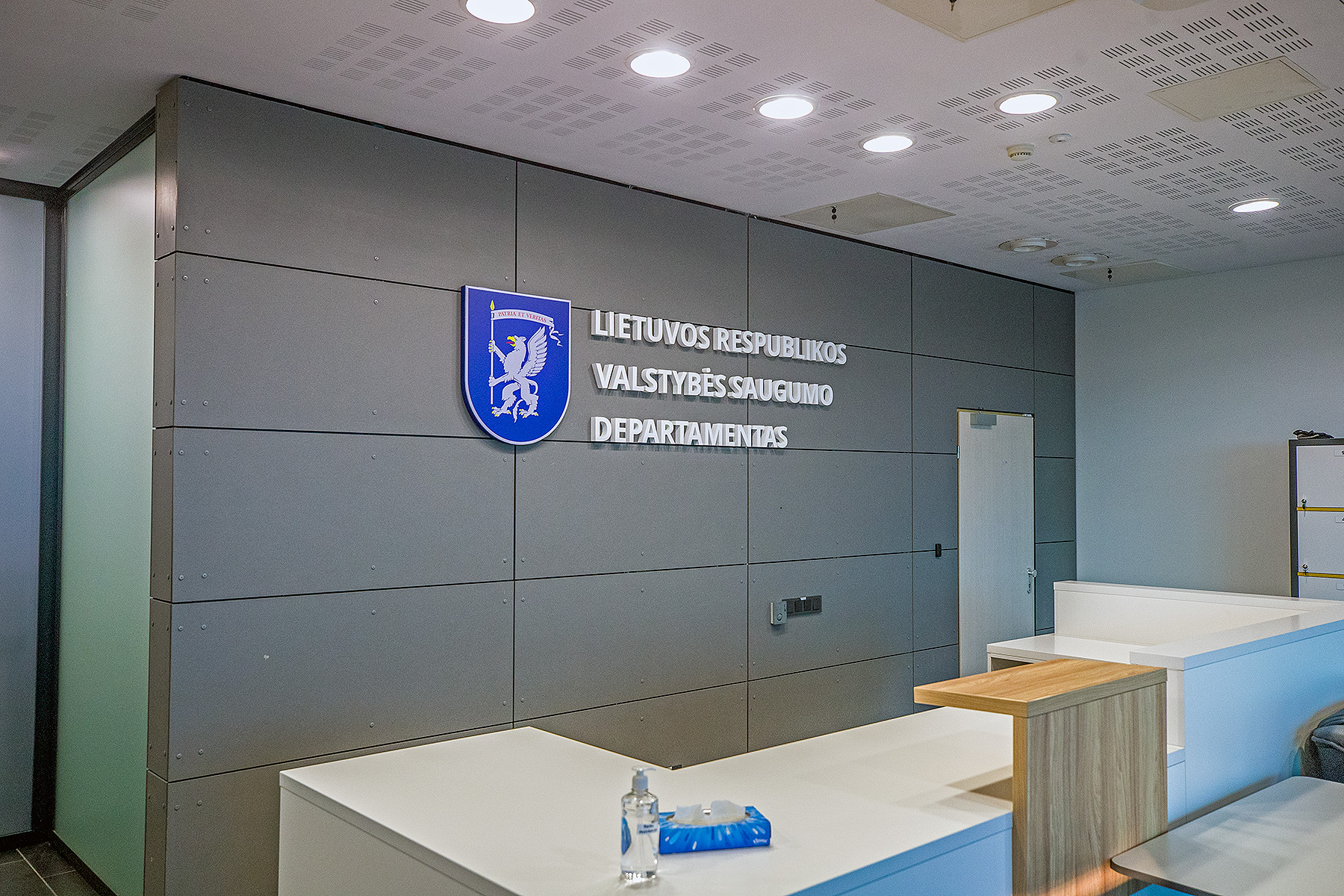
VSD headquarters (inside)

The State Security Department or VSD (Lithuanian: Valstybės saugumo departamentas) is the national civilian intelligence and security agency of Lithuania which collects and analyzing information from internal and external on threats to national security and works to eliminate those threats.

The VSD also conducts analysis and development intelligence gathering and counterintelligence systems to create national security, clandestine and covert operations, counterintelligence, counter-revolutionary, counterterrorism, creating a civilian security network intelligence, cybersecurity to prevent civilian intelligence leaks when systems are hacked, cyberwarfare, executive protection (especially the President of the Republic of Lithuania and visiting foreign leaders), internal security, political warfare, support anti-corruption, and threat assessment to national security, including protecting state secrets and classified information, and vets certain applicants for residence permits or entry to Republic of Lithuania.

== History ==
The origins of the institution are in the Žinių dalis (Intelligence unit) established within the General Staff of the Lithuanian Armed Forces on 27 October 1918 during the Lithuanian Wars of Independence to counter the intelligence services of Russia, Poland and the Communist Party of Lithuania. The first head of the intelligence service was Jonas Žilinskas. As Lithuania did not have personnel professionally trained in espionage, former intelligence officers from the Russian Empire and Imperial Germany were recruited to the service. These officers then passed on their experience to the Lithuanian intelligence officers. On 12 May 1919, Žinių dalis within the General Staff was reorganised into a separate Žvalgybos skyrius (Intelligence Department), comprising a Counterintelligence Division that operated domestically and an Intelligence Division that was responsible for international operations. On 13 August 1923, the Intelligence Department was once again restructured: The Intelligence Division remained under the jurisdiction of the General Staff and was redesignated Division II. Meanwhile, the Counterintelligence Division was allocated to the Civil Protection Department of the Ministry of the Interior and renamed Criminal Division B. In 1924, this was further renamed the Political Police Division. On 1 June 1933, the institution underwent a further reorganisation and received its current name State Security Department with the objective of counterintelligence and suppressing espionage activities. After the Soviet Union occupied Lithuania, the State Security Department was eliminated and many of its members repressed. The last director of the service in the interwar period was Augustinas Povilaitis; in 1940, he was arrested and executed by the Soviets.

During its existence in interwar Lithuania, the VSD managed to expose a number of hostile organizations, including the Polish Military Organization, which planned to overthrow the democratic government of Lithuania in 1919, communist underground groups, illegal printing houses as well as anti-government groups of Plečkaitininkai and Voldemarininkai. However, following the 1926 Lithuanian coup d'état that installed an authoritarian regime led by President Antanas Smetona, the VSD was occasionally employed to suppress opposition and the press.

The department was reestablished on 26 March 1990. At that time, the department was also responsible for certain aspects of law enforcement: providing protection to state officials and strategic objects, ensuring integrity of state communications network, investigating political corruption. Other agencies took over these extra duties and, during 2010, the mission of VSD was clarified to mainly focus on counterintelligence, counterterrorism, intelligence gathering, internal security, and threat assessment to national security.

== Directors ==
- Mečys Laurinkus (26 March 1990 – 19 March 1991)
- Viktoras Zedelis (acting)
- Zigmas Vaišvila (27 September 1991 – 19 March 1992)
- Balys Gajauskas (22 April 1992 – 11 August 1992)
- Petras Plumpa (11 August 1992 – 4 January 1993)
- Jurgis Jurgelis (4 January 1993 – 3 June 1998)
- Mečys Laurinkus (2nd time, 3 June 1998 – 30 April 2004)
- Arvydas Pocius (30 April 2004 – 12 June 2007)
- Povilas Malakauskas (12 June 2007 – 28 December 2009)
- Romualdas Vaišnoras (acting)
- Gediminas Grina (9 April 2010 – 13 April 2015)
- Darius Jauniškis (14 April 2015 – 14 April 2025)
- Remigijus Bridikis (14 April 2025 – Present)

== See also ==
- Second Investigation Department
