= Deividas =

- Gender: Male
- Language: Lithuanian

Origin
- Region of origin: Lithuania

Deividas is a Lithuanian masculine given name. Individuals with the name Deividas include:

- Deividas Česnauskis (born 1981), Lithuanian footballer
- Deividas Dulkys (born 1988), Lithuanian basketball player
- Deividas Gailius (born 1988), Lithuanian basketball player
- Deividas Kumelis (born 1995), Lithuanian basketball player
- Deividas Matulionis (born 1963), Lithuanian politician and diplomat
- Deividas Pukis (born 1992), Lithuanian basketball player
- Deividas Šemberas (born 1978), Lithuanian footballer
- Deividas Sirvydis (born 2000), Lithuanian basketball player
- Deividas Skebas (born 1999), Lithuanian child killer
- Deividas Stagniūnas (born 1985), Lithuanian ice dancer
- Deividas Taurosevičius (born 1977), Lithuanian mixed martial artist
