= Darius Jauniškis =

Lithuanian officer (born 1968)

Director of the State Security Department of Lithuania
- In office 14 April 2015 – 14 April 2025
- President: Dalia Grybauskaitė; Gitanas Nauseda
- Preceded by: Gediminas Grina
- Succeeded by: Remigijus Bridikis

Permanent Representative of Lithuania to NATO
- Incumbent
- Assumed office 30 April 2025
- Preceded by: Deividas Matulionis

Personal details
- Born: 14 January 1968 (age 58) Vilnius, Lithuania
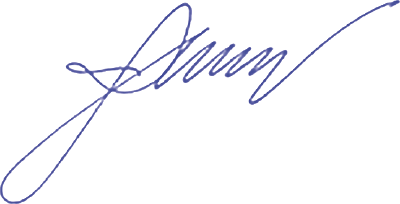
- Signature

Military service
- Rank: Officer
- Unit: Dignitary Protection Service (1990–1994); Special Operations Force (1995–2015); State Security Department (2015–2025)

Darius Jauniškis (born 14 January 1968) is a Lithuanian officer, who served as Director General of the State Security Department of Lithuania from 2015 until 2025.

== Biography ==
Jauniškis was born in Vilnius, Lithuania. He graduated from Vilnius Pedagogical Institute in 2005 with a degree in economics, and then studied at the Baltic Defence College in Tartu in 2006 before studying at the United States Army War College in Pennsylvania, USA. He then received a master's degree in strategic studies from the University of Washington.

Between 1990 and 1993, Jauniškis worked in the security department of the Supreme Council – Reconstituent Seimas, and worked in several ministries between 1993 and 1995 before serving in the special purpose service of the Special Operations Forces. Between 1997 and 2006 he was the deputy commander of the SPS, and later commander between 2006 and 2008. He was then promoted to commander of the SOF between 2008 and 2015. During his time as a soldier, he participated in several missions in Afghanistan.

On 13 April 2015, he was appointed as the Director of the State Security Department of Lithuania, and was appointed for the role again in 2020. Jauniškis has taken preventative measures against Russian espionage and activity in the country since 2015, being extremely public with statements calling for civilians to be more aware of Russian espionage attempts in the country. Following the Russian invasion of Ukraine in February 2022, Jauniškis was ranked as one of the most influential figures in Lithuania. In 2023, Jauniškis stated that Belarusian espionage in Lithuania was at "an all-time high". He cited the intensification in espionage was due to Russia's frustration with a longer war in Ukraine and high number of Belarusian immigrants.

In March 2024, Jauniškis accused Russia of targeting Russian dissident Leonid Volkov, who was attacked in Lithuania. Later that month, Jauniškis was implicated in a controversy after reports emerged of the State Security Department spying on President Gitanas Nausėda's voter base, possibly assisting him in his campaign for election.

On 18 April 2025, Jauniškis was appointed as Lithuania's permanent representative to NATO, replacing Deividas Matulionis. He presented his credentials to Secretary General Mark Rutte on 29 April 2025.
