= Gediminas Grina =

Director General of the State Security Department
- In office 9 April 2010 – 13 April 2015
- Preceded by: Romualdas Vaišnoras (acting)
- Succeeded by: Darius Jauniškis

Personal details
- Born: Gediminas Grina; 5 May 1965 (age 61) Anykščiai, Lithuania

Gediminas Grina (born 5 May 1965) is a Lithuanian political military commander who was the Director General of the State Security Department of Lithuania in 2010–2015. He is currently a Lieutenant Colonel of the Lithuanian Armed Forces.

== Biography ==
Gediminas Grina was born in Anykščiai on 5 May 1965. In 1990, he completed his degree in physics at the University of Vilnius and worked from 1990 to 1992 at the research institute “Venta” as an engineer and technologist. From 1992 he worked in the Mechanised Infantry Brigade Iron Wolf and from 1999 to 2001 at the Ministry of Defense of Lithuania as head of a department. In 1993, he was made a first lieutenant, in 1997 a captain, and in 1999 a major.

From 2001 to 2004, he was a military attaché in the Lithuanian embassy in the United States and Canada. In 2004, he joined the Second Investigation Department (AOTD). From 2005 to 2010, he was deputy director for espionage at AOTD. On 9 April 2010, Grina was appointed as the General Director of State Security Department of Lithuania. He was promoted to security general by President Dalia Grybauskaitė.

Grina is one of the 89 people from the European Union against whom Russia imposed an entry ban in May 2015.
