= Ivan Lappo =

Russian historian

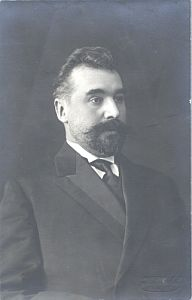
- Born: Ivan Lappo; 29 August 1869; Tsarskoye Selo, Russian Empire
- Died: 23 December 1944 (aged 75); Dresden, Germany
- Cause of death: Air raid
- Citizenship: Lithuanian
- Occupation: Academic professor
- Known for: Historian

Ivan Ivanovich Lappo (Russian: Иван Иванович Лаппо, Lithuanian: Ivanas Lãpo; 29 August 1869 – 23 December 1944) was a Russian-Lithuanian historian. He specialized in the history of the Grand Duchy of Lithuania, especially during the late medieval and early modern period. He shared the vision prevailing in Russian historiography, namely that the union between Lithuania and Poland was enforced by the latter. However, unlike most Russian scholars of the era, he maintained that Lithuania retained political autonomy and remained the subject of international politics. Throughout his career, he held academic seats at the universities of Tartu, Voronezh, Prague, Kaunas and Vilnius.

== Academic career ==
Lappo began his teaching career by holding minor jobs at the University of St. Peterburg (1902–1905). Then he assumed the chair of Russian history in Juriev (1905–1918) and briefly held various jobs in Voronezh (1918–1919). On exile he kept teaching at the Russian University in Prague, Czechoslovakia (1923–1932) and at the Vytuautas the Great University in Kaunas, Lithuania (1933–1940).

=== Early years ===
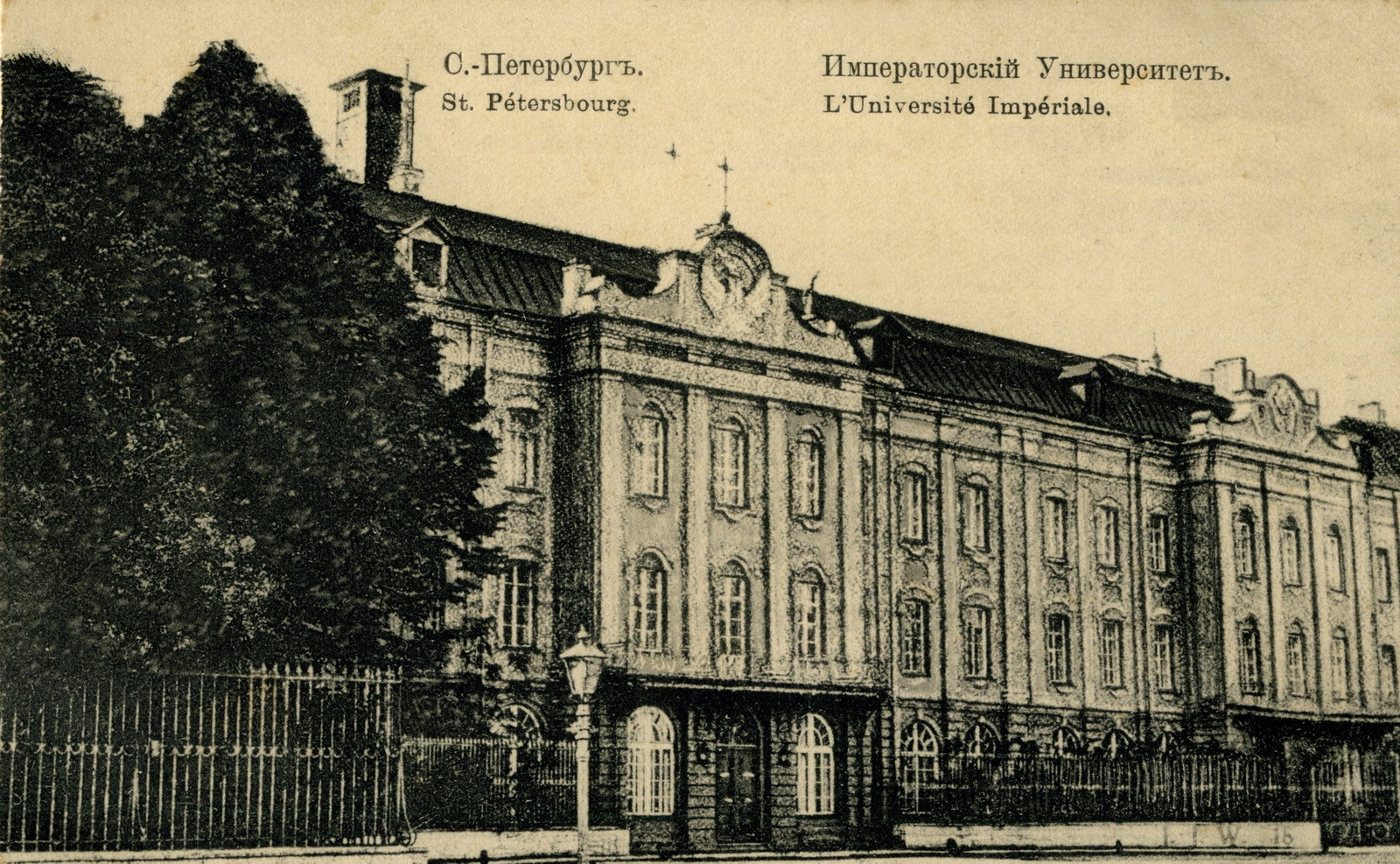
Petersburg university, early 20th c.

Lappo descended from an old Ruthenian noble family, whose roots can be traced back to the 16th century. It was related to what is now Eastern Belarus and its various representatives held estates between Minsk and Vitebsk. The branch of Lappo's ascendants did not hold land possessions; his father was a mid-range official in the administration of the Synod of the Russian Orthodox Church, though his exact position is not clear.

In 1888, the 19-year-old Ivan entered the historical-philological faculty of St. Peterburg Imperial University. For reasons which are not known and were probably related to financial difficulties, some time in the early 1890s, he commenced teaching in one of the high schools and graduated as late as 1902. His thesis gained the G. F. Karpov prize, awarded by the Russian Historical Society, and was published as a book. Its author was offered a junior teaching role at the university.

=== Teaching in Russia ===
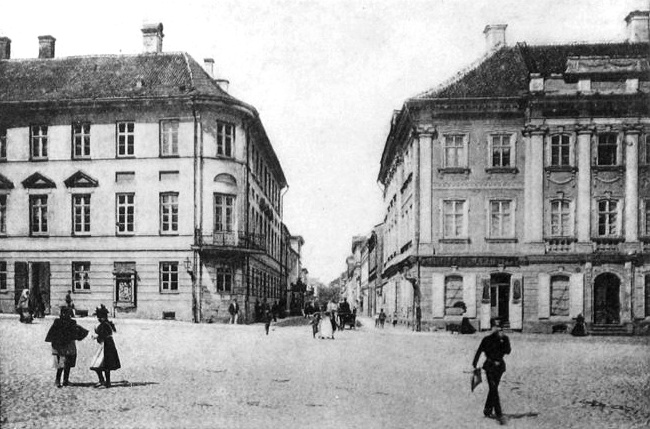
Juriev university, early 20th c.

In 1905, Lappo assumed the chair of Russian history at the University of Juriev (now Tartu). In 1911, he obtained a PhD laurels at the University of Moscow and then became head of the historical department in Juriev; at the same time, he was commissioned to prepare a scientific edition of the Lithuanian Statute of 1588. In 1916, he was nominated to a historiographic committee of the Education Ministry.

Following the German takeover of the Governorate of Livonia, Lappo decided to leave for central Russia. In the summer of 1918, together with most of the university staff, he was transferred to the bolshevik-held Voronezh. At the newly set-up local university and in somewhat chaotic circumstances, he held various teaching roles, until in the spring of 1919 he was nominated head of the governorate's state archive.

=== Escape from Russia; Czechoslovakia ===
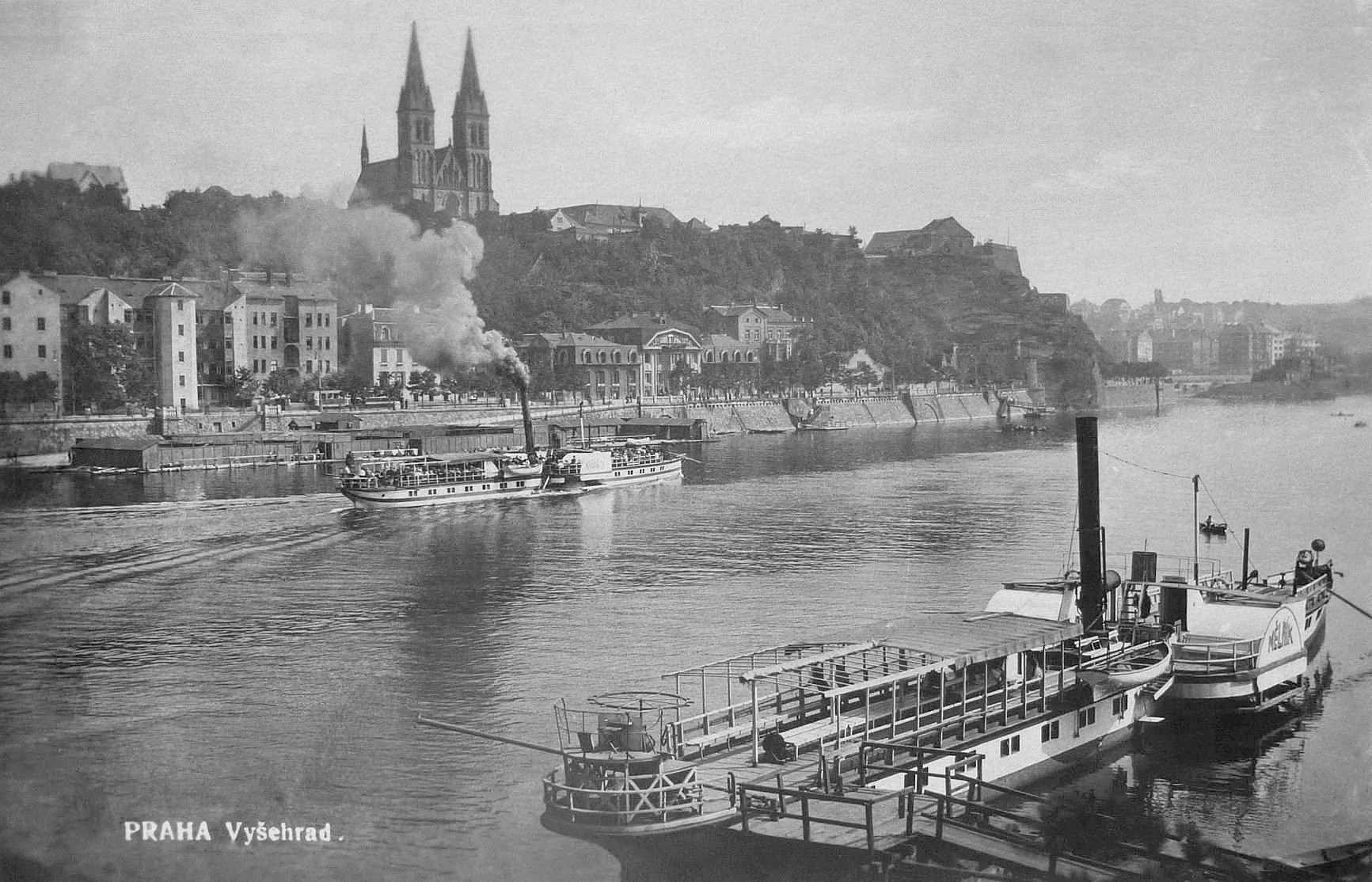
Prague in the 1920s

In October 1919, Voronezh was taken over by counter-revolutionary troops. Lappo seized the opportunity; at the university, he applied for leave claiming health and family reasons, and then, together with his wife and son, he left the city towards the Black Sea coast. In 1920, in Novorossiysk they boarded a British evacuation ship and sailed to Greece, soon to move to the Kingdom of Serbs, Croats and Slovenes; Lappo was financially aided by the British.

In 1921, Lappo moved to Prague and contributed to the setup of the Russian University, which opened in 1923. He held various positions in history and continued to publish articles, brochures, and books. In the mid-1920s, he started to co-operate with the Lithuanian Ministry of Foreign Affairs and kept preparing various memoranda, supposed to provide historical backing to Lithuanian political claims, advanced during the diplomatic row against Poland over Vilnius.

=== In Lithuania ===
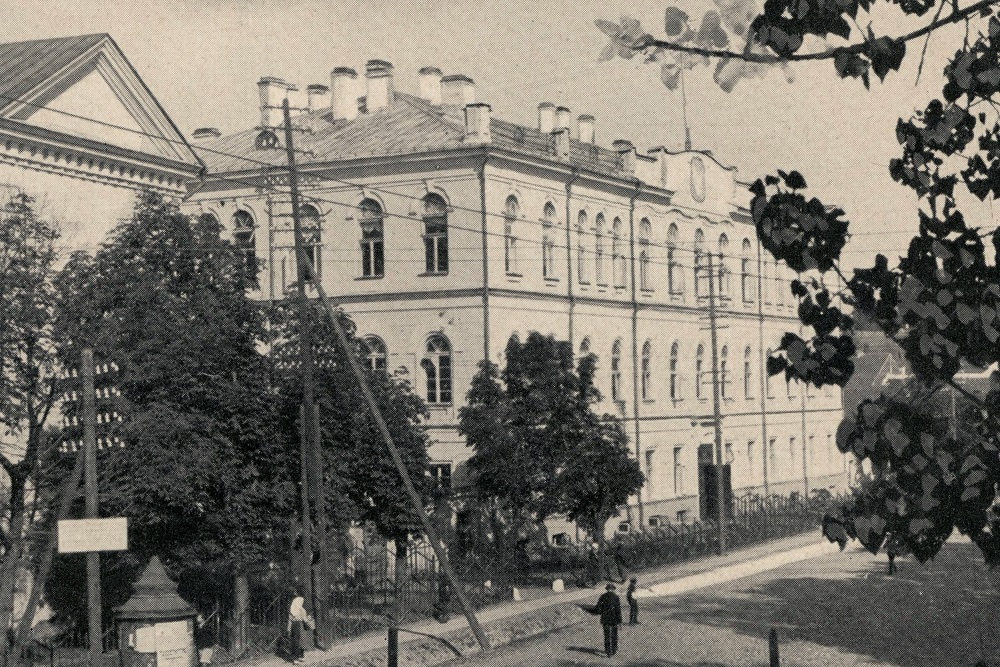
Kaunas in the 1930s

In the early 1930s, Lappo applied for a post at the Kaunas University, but was rejected as he did not speak Lithuanian. However, thanks to the support of president Smetona, in 1932, he was contracted to carry out work on the Lithuanian Statute and moved to Kaunas. Since 1933, he has taught at the university as a privatdozent. In 1938, he was awarded the Order of the Lithuanian Grand Duke Gediminas III degree, "for services to Lithuania". In 1939 and at the request of the university, he was granted Lithuanian citizenship.

Following the fall of Poland in October 1939, Lappo was assigned to the reorganised Vilnius University, though he kept living in Kaunas. After the Soviet occupation of Lithuania, new authorities terminated Lappo's contract, which left him in total financial misery. His status improved somewhat when, following the German seizure of Lithuania in 1941 he was briefly employed as privatdozent at Vilnius University and then in 1942, he obtained a short-lived teaching contract. In unclear circumstances he left Lithuania and died in Dresden.

== Works ==
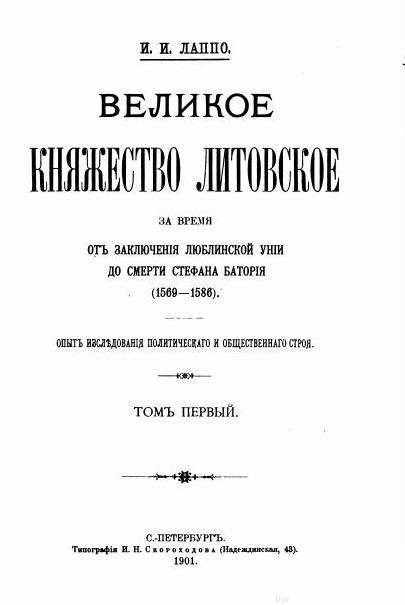
Великое княжество Литовское...

Almost all of Lappo's historiographic output is related to the Grand Duchy of Lithuania, though the perspective differed. During the first half of his academic career, Lappo focused mostly on exploring relations between the Duchy and the Kingdom of Poland, be it with regard to the mechanics of the Lublin Union or with later relations between the two components of the Polish-Lithuanian Commonwealth. During the second half and following his exile from Russia, he recalibrated his works to an analysis of national identities in-between Russia and Poland, though he kept working on his opus magnum, the scholarly edition of Lithuanian statutes from the late 16th century.

=== Studies on the Grand Duchy of Lithuania ===
Except for his mid-term treaty on the Tver county in the 16th. century all Lappo's works have been dedicated to the Grand Duchy of Lithuania. Following minor detailed treaties on juridical establishments, published in the 1890s, his first major work was the graduation dissertation Великое княжество Литовское за время от заключения Люблинской Унии до смерти Стефана Батория (1901), a legal-political study on the regime of the Grand Duchy between 1569 and 1586. It was followed by the PhD thesis Великое княжество Литовское во второй половине XVI столетия (1911), which extended the analysis until the end of the 16th century. A spate of more focused analytical articles followed in the 1910s; they dealt mostly with various aspects of the Lithuanian juridical and legal system, usually with regard to the eastern voivodships of Vitebsk and Polock.

=== Western borderlands of Russia ===
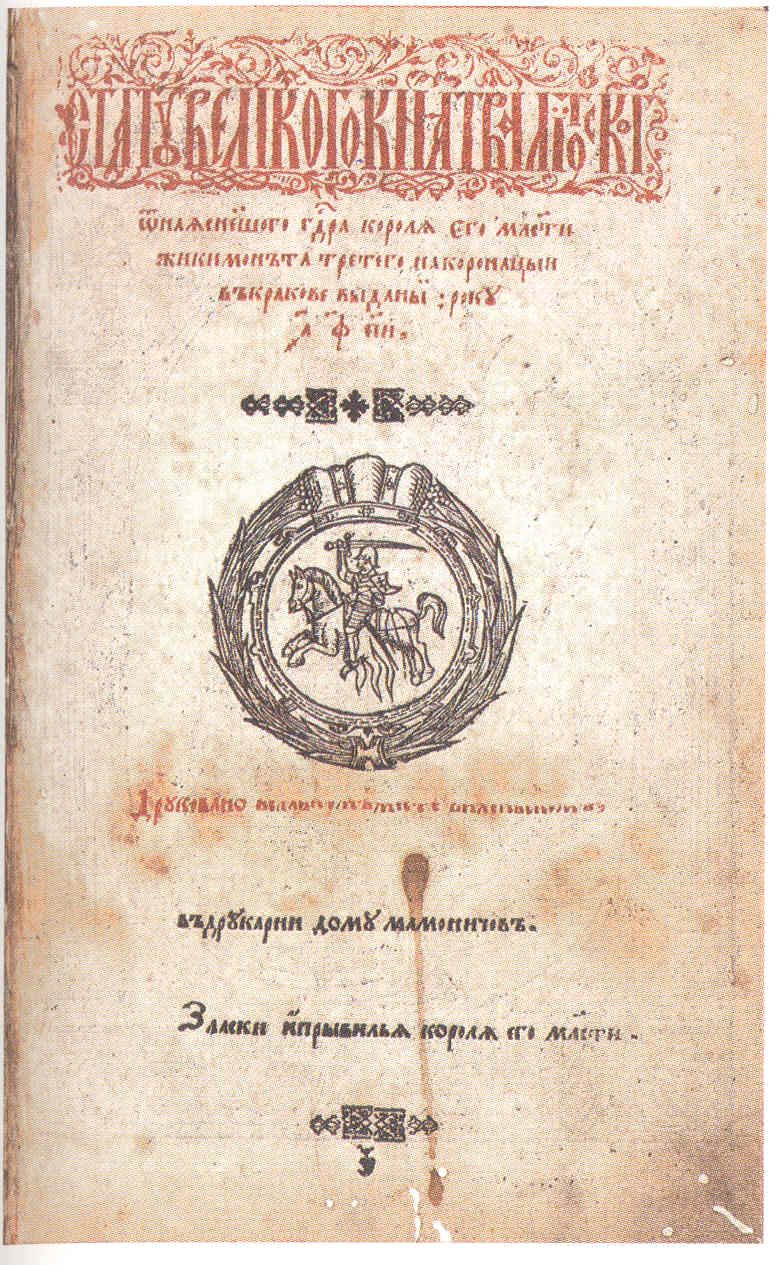
Lithuanian Statute

In exile, Lappo's works suffered from limited access to sources, and his focus largely shifted to a more general approach, exploring the political history of Eastern Europe between Moscow/Russia, the Grand Duchy of Lithuania and Poland. Западная Россия и её соединение с Польшей в их историческом прошлом (1924) explored Russian-Polish relations against the broad background of the modern era. Происхождение украинской идеологии Новейшего времени (1926) focused on emergent national identities on western Russia's borderlands, while Идея единства русского народа в Юго-Западной Руси в эпоху присоединения Малороссии к Московскому государству (1929) and Россия и славянство (1930) were studies that examined the Slavicophile idea, especially with regard to the Ukrainian territories. However, Lappo's key historiographic contribution is not an own narrative but en extremely competent and detailed monumental edition of the Lithuanian statutes; as Литовский Статут 1588 года it was issued in 4 volumes in Kaunas in the years of 1934–1936.

== Key concepts ==
The Russian pre-revolutionary historiography, represented by Nikolay Gerasimovich Ustryalov, Mikhail Osipovich Koyalovich, Nikolay Alexeyevich Maksimieyko, Matvey Kuzmich Lyubavskiy and Fedor Ivanovich Leontovich, worked out a fairly definite assessment of the Union of Lublin and later position of Lithuania within the Polish-Lithuanian Commonwealth. It presented the merger as engineered and carried out by the Poles, who enforced their own project to the detriment of the Lithuanians and which, in the course of the coming years, deprived Lithuania of its own independent political standing. Lappo introduced major changes to this vision and partially presented his own perspective.

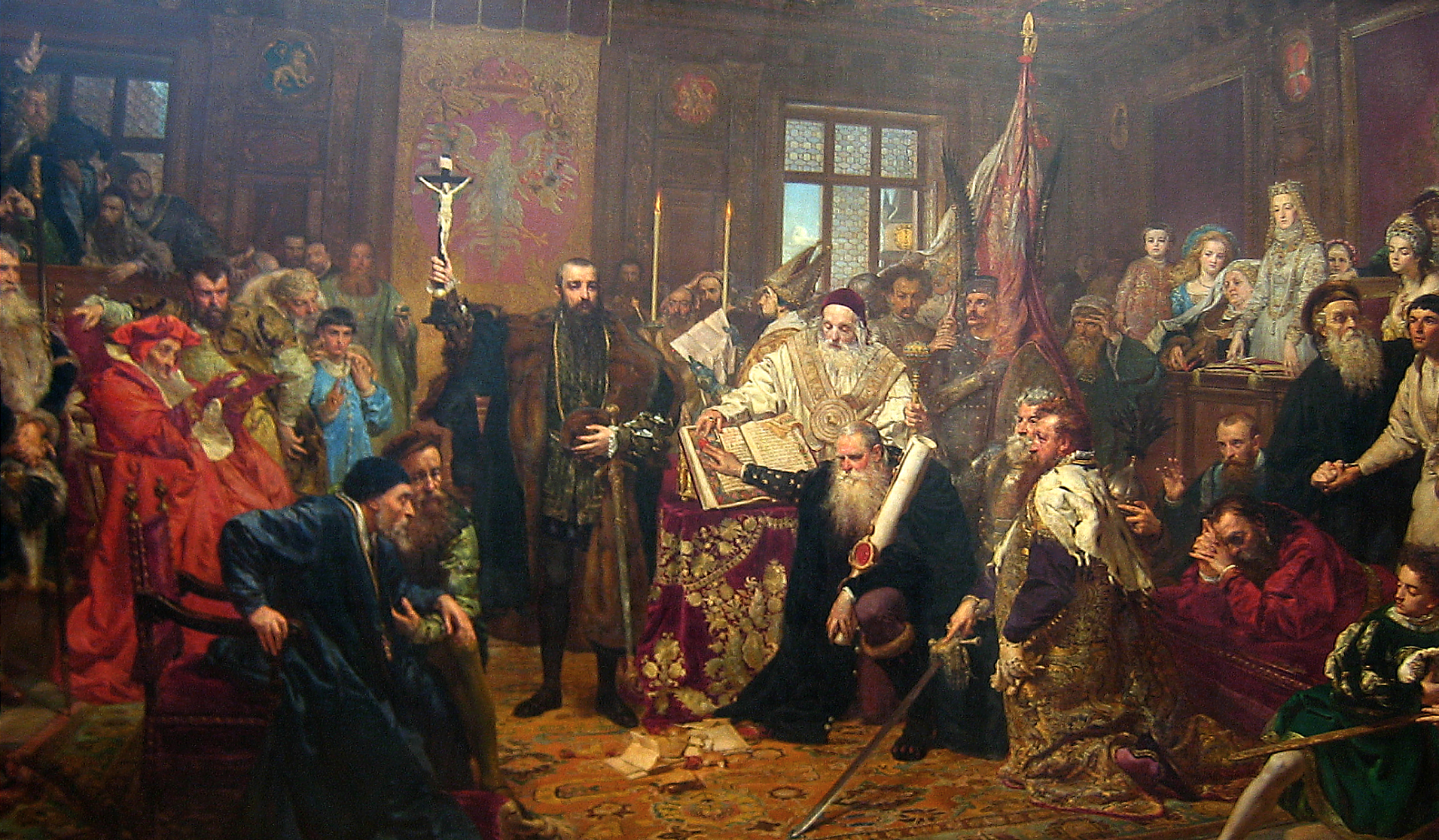
Lublin Union in art; Polish painting of Jan Matejko, 1869

Lappo carried out a fairly detailed reconstruction of the Sejm of Lublin and the circumstances of the conclusion of the Polish-Lithuanian union in 1569. He agreed that the Poles were bent on imposing their own terms of the union upon the Lithuanians, though, unlike fellow Russian scholars, he distinguished between different positions adopted by Sigismund II Augustus, the magnates and most of the nobility, expressed in somewhat diverse visions advocated by the Senate and by the Chamber of Deputies. Lappo's general attitude towards the Union of Lublin remained negative; he sympathised with Lithuanians, seeing Poles as merely caring for their own interests.

Within the Russian historiography, the innovative idea fathered by Lappo was that despite largely disadvantageous terms of the Union, Lithuania retained its political identity and remained the subject of political game, both within the Commonwealth and internationally. He analysed in detail both the legal framework and the praxis; this provided him with arguments that the Crown of Poland had never managed to turn Lithuania into its province, and that when in the early 18th century Lithuania gradually became the object of politics, it was rather because of international developments, especially against the background of the Swedish-Russian conflict.

== Reception and legacy ==
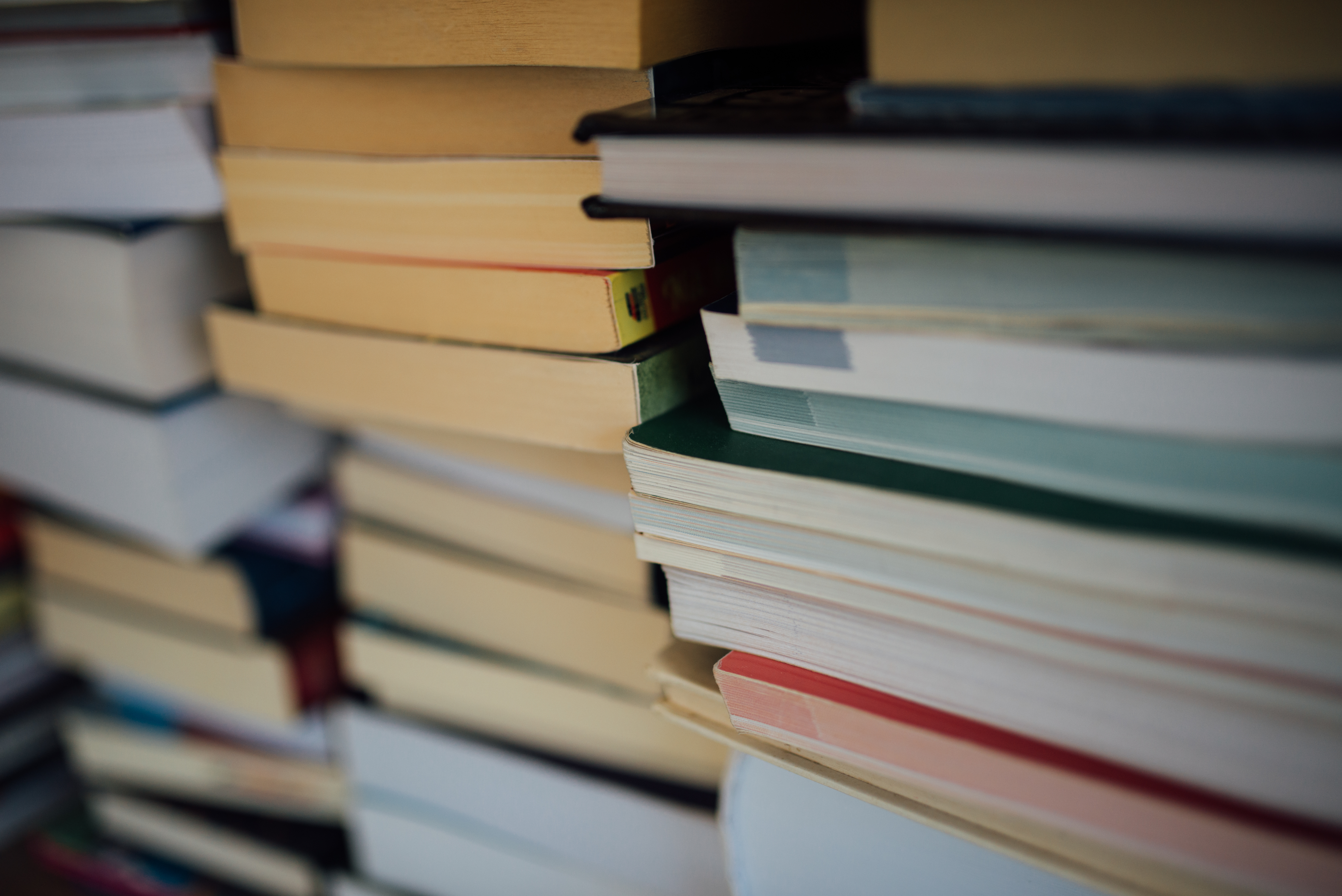

Despite running against the main current, Lappo's graduation thesis was very well received; reviewers noticed attention to detail, great command of sources and a holistic approach with wide coverage of the background. Some criticism was related to his alleged bias, reportedly stemming from a sort of Lithuanian patriotism. The reception led to offering him the prestigious chair of Russian history in Juriev at the relatively young age of 36. Continuation of his work, formatted as a PhD thesis, was also widely acclaimed. The rector of the Moscow University, Matvey Kuzmich Lyubavskiy, suggested that Lappo's work be awarded the Karpov prize; he obtained long-term research contracts and was gradually emerging as a rising star of Russian historiography.

Lappo's career in the academic structures of imperial Russia was terminated due to political turmoil and revolution. When in exile in Czechoslovakia, his work suffered from limited access to sources. His studies on national identities on western Russian borderlands are considered of lower quality; scholars underline rather Lappo's massive pedagogical effort in Prague. Acknowledgement of his research in the Republic of Lithuania was partially due to politics, as the Kaunas government was leaving no stone unturned in search for arguments that over the centuries Lithuania has been defending its sovereignty against Polish designs.

In the USSR, Lappo went into almost total oblivion; if mentioned, it was usually so in relation to the history of Tartu University. He was stigmatized as a scholar from “a historiograhic school characterised by lack of interest when it comes to position of the exploited popular masses”, “typical representative of the official conservative current of the bourgeoisie historiography during the imperialist period”, or static scholar, who was “unable to realize the nature of historical process” and “objective rules of development and reasons for aggravated social contradictions”.

In the post-Soviet era Lappo gained a few monographic articles by Lithuanian, Russian and Polish authors; they underline his profound knowledge of sources and scholarly competence when it comes to Grand Duchy of Lithuania in the modern era, even if some scholars note "quite paradoxical and partly incoherent" narrative. His scientific contribution is discussed against the background of political turmoil in Russia and Eastern Europe, which first condemned Lappo to 20 years of living on exile, and then trapped him in tragically destitute conditions during World War II.

== See also ==
- Grand Duchy of Lithuania
