= Jurgis Baltrušaitis (art historian) =

Lithuanian historian (1903–1988)

Jurgis Baltrušaitis (May 7, 1903 – January 25, 1988) was a Lithuanian art historian, art critic and a founder of comparative art research. He was the son of the poet and diplomat Jurgis Baltrušaitis. Most of his works were written in French, although he always stressed his Lithuanian origin. After Lithuania was occupied by the USSR in 1945, he served as a diplomat in exile.

== Biography ==
Baltrušaitis was born in Moscow. During his childhood he was immersed in the intense cultural life of his parents. One of his first teachers was the Russian poet and writer Boris Pasternak.

In 1924, he moved to Paris and began theater studies at the Sorbonne under the guidance of Professor Henri Focillon. Under his influence Baltrušaitis chose to study the history of art. He went on to do research in Armenia, Georgia, Spain, Italy, and Germany, receiving a doctorate from the Sorbonne in 1931. Later that year he became the cultural attache at the Lithuanian Legation in Paris.

Between 1933 and 1939 Baltrušaitis taught art history at the Vytautas Magnus University in Kaunas, as well as lecturing at the Sorbonne and at the Warburg Institute in London.

After World War II he delivered lectures at New York University, Yale University, Harvard University, and at the Metropolitan Museum of Art.

His diplomatic efforts included writing for the French press on Lithuanian issues, and representing Lithuania in international organizations such as the Académie Internationale des Sciences et des Lettres and the Lithuanian Legation in Paris.

Baltrušaitis died in Paris.

== Publications ==
- Études sur l'art médiéval en Géorgie et en Arménie, Paris: E. Leroux, 1929.
- La Stylistique ornementale dans la sculpture romane, Paris: E. Leroux-Collège de France, 1931. Excerpt in English translation in Wylie Sypher (ed.), Art History: an Anthology of Modern Criticism, Gloucester, MA: P. Smith, 1975, p. 116–131; Second edition: Formations, déformations: La stylistique ornementale dans la sculpture romane (Idées et recherches), Paris: Flammarion, 1986.
- Art sumérien, art roman, Paris: E. Leroux, 1934.
- Guide de l'exposition d'art populaire baltique, Paris: Musée d'ethnographie du Trocadéro, 1935.
- Le Problème de l'Ogive et l'Arménie, Paris: E. Leroux, 1936.
- L'Église cloisonnée en Orient et en Occident, Paris: Éditions d'art et d'histoire, 1941.
- Lithuanian folk art (Lithuania, country and nation, 3), Munich: T. J. Vizgirda, 1948.
- Le Moyen Âge fantastique: antiquités et exotismes dans l'art gothique, Paris: A. Colin, 1955.
- Aberrations : quatre essais sur la légende des formes [Les perspectives dépravées I], Paris: O. Perrin, Jeu savant, 1957.
- Réveils et prodiges: le gothique fantastique, Paris: A. Colin, 1960.
- Anamorphoses ou Perspective curieuses [Les perspectives dépravées II], Paris : O. Perrin, Jeu savant, 1955. Éd. Paris: O. Perrin, 1969 : Anamorphoses ou Magie artificielle des effets merveilleux. English translation: Anamorphic Art, New York : Abrams, 1976.
- Jardins en France, 1760-1820 : pays d'illusion, terre d'expériences, exposition' (Paris, Hôtel de Sully, mai-septembre 1977), Paris: CNMHS, 1977.
- Le miroir: révélations, science-fiction et fallacies. Essai sur une légende scientifique, Paris: A. Elmayan-Le Seuil, 1978.
- La Quête d'Isis: essai sur la légende d'un mythe [Les perspectives dépravées III], Paris: Flammarion, 1985.

== Trivia ==
Algirdas Julius Greimas once noted that in the West the elder Jurgis Baltrušaitis is known as the father of a famous art historian, but in Eastern Europe - the younger Jurgis Baltrušaitis is known as the son of a famous poet.

Jurgis Baltrušaitis and his wife Hélène Baltrusaitis were family friends of Paul and Julia Child during their residence in Paris in the late 1940s and early 1950s. They are mentioned multiple times in Julia Child's memoir My Life in France.
