= Jurgis Baltrušaitis =

Lithuanian poet (1897–1944)

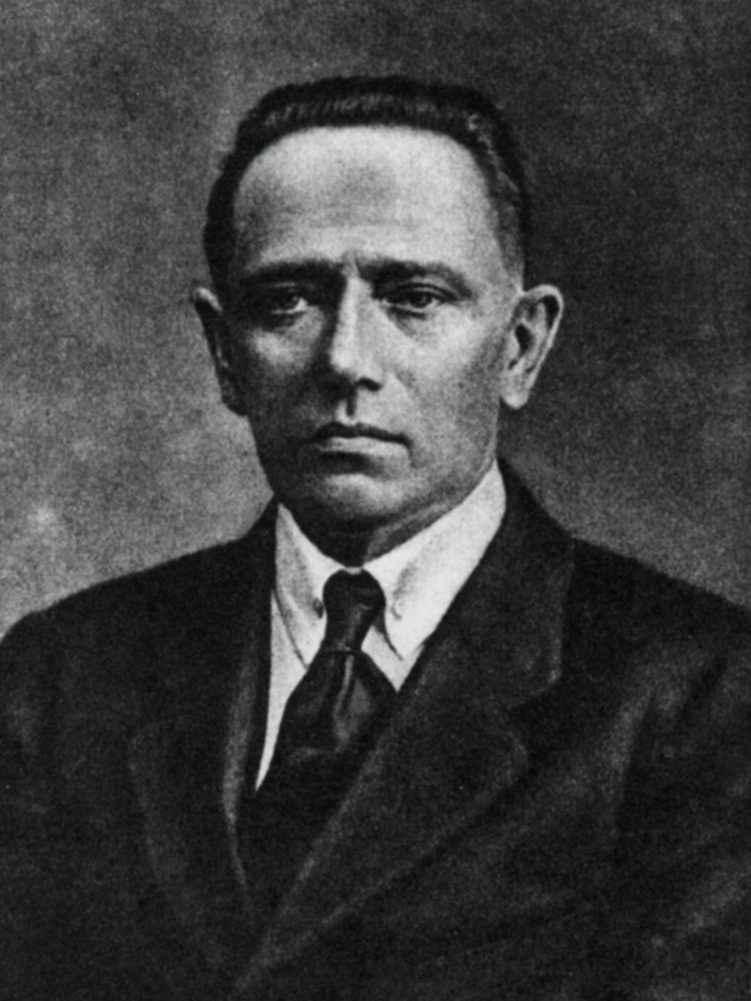
- Baltrušaitis c. 1914
- Born: 20 April 1873; Paantvardys village near Jurbarkas, Russian Empire
- Died: 3 January 1944 (aged 70); Paris, France
- Education: Imperial Moscow University (1898)
- Occupations: Diplomat, poet
- Writing career
- Genre: Symbolism

Jurgis Baltrušaitis (2 May 1873 – 3 January 1944) was a Lithuanian Symbolist poet and translator who wrote in Lithuanian and Russian, and was an exponent of iconology. He was the father of art historian and critic Jurgis Baltrušaitis Jr.

== Writer ==
Baltrušaitis was born to a family of farmers in Paantvardys village near Jurbarkas, which was then under Imperial Russian rule. In 1885, he entered Kaunas gymnasium, and graduated in 1893; he then entered the Faculty of Physical and Mathematical Sciences at Imperial Moscow University. At the same time he attended lectures in the Faculty of History and Philology.

From 1895 onwards Baltrušaitis began to take part in editing Moscow-based literary magazines, and he began to work in Russian. He joined the Symbolist movement, and, in association with Sergei Polyakov, set up the publishing house Scorpio, which published the chief Russian Symbolist magazines such as Vesy and Severnyie Tzvety as well as collections of Russian Symbolist poets.

Baltrušaitis published three collections of poetry in Russian, and another three in Lithuanian. Authors he translated into Russian translations include Henrik Ibsen, Oscar Wilde, August Strindberg, Knut Hamsun and Gabriele D'Annunzio.

== Politician ==
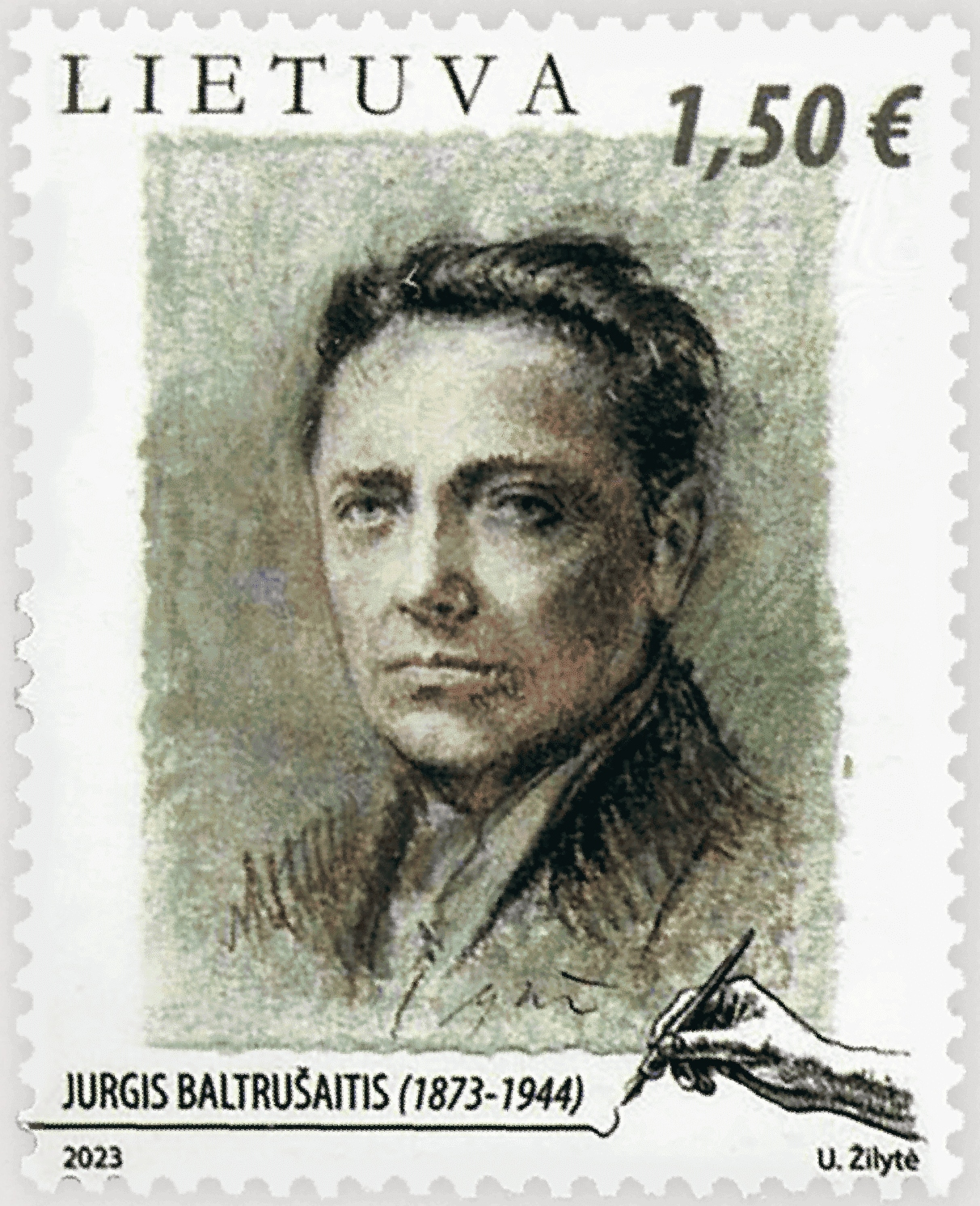
Baltrušaitis on a 2023 stamp of Lithiania

Between 1900 and 1914, Baltrušaitis lived in Italy and Norway and spent much time traveling in other countries in Western Europe. During World War I and the subsequent Russian Revolution he was in Russia, where he actively participated in the Lithuanian political struggle for independence. In 1919 he was elected President of the Russian Union of Writers, and was known for his efforts to help and rescue many writers and intellectuals during the first years of the Bolshevik regime.

After Lithuania regained independence in 1918, Baltrušaitis was appointed Lithuania's ambassador to Russia in 1920 and held this position until 1939. In 1932 he was honored with a doctorate by Vytautas Magnus University in Kaunas. In 1939, Baltrušaitis was appointed a counselor of the Lithuanian embassy in Paris. Following the annexation of Lithuania by the Soviet Union, his son, Jurgis Baltrušaitis Jr., an art historian and art critic, served as a diplomat for the Lithuanian diplomatic service which continued to represent Lithuanian interests in some Western countries. Baltrušaitis Sr. died in Paris in January 1944; he is buried at Montrouge Cemetery.

== See also ==
- Three hares
