= Reuben Efron =

Lithuanian-American intelligence officer

Reuben Efron (1911–1993) was a Lithuanian-American who served in the US Army and the Central Intelligence Agency (CIA).

== Early life and education ==
Efron was born in Lithuania on 12 April 1911 as 'Ruvelis Effronas'. He attended a Jewish high school, and following this Vytautas Magnus University where he studied law. He then practiced law for five years in Kaunas.

== Career ==
In 1939, he came to Miami via Cuba. He spoke English, Russian, Lithuanian, Hebrew, Yiddish and German; serving in the US Air Force as a translator during World War 2. Before his retirement he attained the rank of Lieutenant-Colonel. In 1955, he accompanied Senator Richard Russell Jr. on a trip to the USSR. Here he and Russell reported seeing "flying saucers" which have been said to have been experimental Soviet aircraft.

=== JFK assassination ===
Efron was charged with the interception and reading of Lee Harvey Oswald's mail before the assassination of President John F. Kennedy. He was also present when, in February 1964, the Warren Commission, charged with investigating the assassination, interviewed Oswald's widow Marina.

Besides his work for intelligence, Efron published five articles in the Jewish Bible Quarterly, including a four-part series on 'Military Intelligence in the Bible'. Efron was an observant Orthodox Jew.

== Later life and death ==
He spent some time in Israel before dying on 22 November 1993.
