= Jurgis Blekaitis =

American poet and theatre producer (1917-2007)

Jurgis Blekaitis (July 8, 1917, in Kellomäki, Finland – June 25, 2007, in Laurel, Maryland) was a Lithuanian American poet, theater producer, and former editor for the Voice of America.

== Early life ==
Blekaitis was born in Kellomäki, Finland, which at the time was still part of the Russian Empire, while his family was on vacation. His father worked in the Russian Imperial Army. The Blekaitis family lived in St. Petersburg. However, the Russian Revolution erupted just months after Blekaitis's birth.

The Blekaitis family escaped the effects of the revolution in St. Petersburg by fleeing to the family's hometown of Birštonas, Lithuania. Lithuania gained independence from Russia following the Russian Revolution. Blekaitis learned Polish, his mother's native tongue, as well as Russian and Lithuanian. Throughout the rest of his life Blekaitis continued to learn new languages. He eventually also learned English, French and German. Blekaitis earned a degree in theater from Vytautas Magnus University in Kaunas, Lithuania, and began work as an actor and director.

Blekaitis was nearly sent to a concentration camp in Liepāja, Latvia, with other Lithuanian intellectuals near the end of World War II. However, with the advance of the Soviet army, Blekaitis was forced to flee to a refugee camp in Germany. While in Germany, Blekaitis enrolled in a Freiburg art school. He helped organize acting troupes and toured several refugee camps throughout Germany.

== Career in the United States ==
Blekaitis immigrated to the United States in 1949 and settled in New York City. He produced Russian theater in Brooklyn and other ethnic theater programs.

Blekaitis joined the Voice of America in New York in 1952. He moved to the Washington, D.C. area when the Voice of America moved its headquarters in 1954. He worked in the VOA's Lithuanian service from 1952 until his retirement in 1987. He became a senior editor at the VOA.

Blekaitis continued writing while in the United States. He was noted for translating works by Ivar Ivask, Czesław Miłosz, and Joseph Brodsky to English. He published two books of original poetry, as well as a Lithuanian memoir.

Blekaitis died on June 25, 2007, at his home in Laurel, Maryland of Alzheimer's disease.
