= Deividas Matulionis =

Lithuanian politician and diplomat

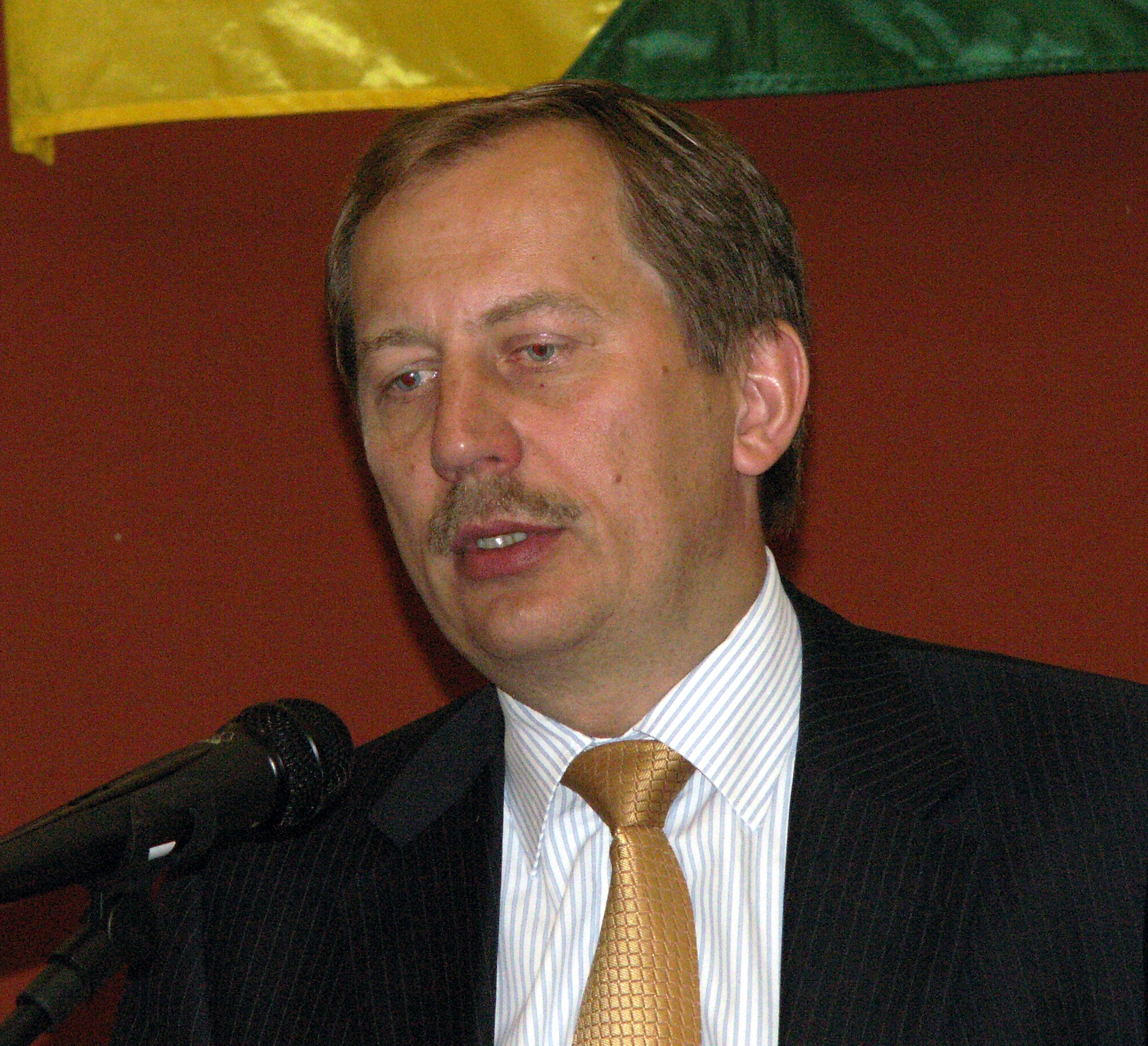
- Matulionis in July 2009

Permanent representative to NATO
- In office 20 April 2020 – 18 April 2025
- Preceded by: Vytautas Leškevičius
- Succeeded by: Darius Jauniškis

Ambassador to Germany
- In office 23 October 2012 – 11 July 2017
- Preceded by: Mindaugas Butkus
- Succeeded by: Darius Semaška

Ambassador to Denmark
- In office 2001–2006
- Preceded by: Raimundas Jasinevičius
- Succeeded by: Rasa Kairienė

Personal details
- Born: Deividas Matulionis; 2 September 1963 (age 62) Vilnius, Soviet Union

Deividas Matulionis (born 2 September 1963), is a Lithuanian politician and diplomat, who was the permanent representative to NATO between 2020 and 2025.

He was the former Chancellor of the Prime Minister of Lithuania.

Matulionis had also served as the ambassador to Germany from 2012 to 2017, as well as the Ambassador to Denmark from 2001 to 2006.

== Biography ==
Deividas Matulionis was born in Vilnius on 2 September 1963.

In 1986, he graduated from the Faculty of Industrial Economics of Vilnius University. From 1986 to 1991, he studied at VU EF Department of Economic Theory Assistant.

In 1991 he moved to the Lithuanian Ministry of Foreign Affairs, where he held various positions.

From 1991 to 1993, he was a Senior Specialist, First Secretary of the Nordic Division of the Ministry of Foreign Affairs of Lithuania. From 1993 to 1994 was the Chargé d'Affaires to Republic to Estonia In 1994, he was promoted to the Adviser to the Embassy of Lithuania in Estonia. From 1994 to 1995, he was an adviser to the Embassy of Lithuania in Norway. From 1995 to 1997, he was an Adviser to the Embassy of Lithuania in Denmark.

He served as the Head of the Scandinavian Department of the Ministry of Foreign Affairs from 1997 to 1998, and in 1998 he was appointed to the Head of the Foreign Affairs Department of Western European countries.

Between 1998 and 2001 he was a consultant to the Lithuanian government on international relations.

From 2001 to 2006, Matulionis was the ambassador to Denmark. From 2006 to 2007, he served as the Director of Economic Security Policy at the Ministry of Foreign Affairs in Iceland.

Before becoming State Secretary of the Ministry of Foreign Affairs in 2007, he headed the Economic Security Policy Department. From 2007 to 2009, he was the Minister of State.

In 2009, Matulionis was chancellor to the Prime Minister of Lithuania, Andrius Kubilius.

In 2011, he was named Civil Servant of the Year in the elections of Veidas magazine.

On 23 October 2012, Matulionis became the ambassador to Germany.

The Lithuanian Independence Act was in Berlin on 29 March 2017, while Matulionis. Matulionis was shown to the public together with the German Minister of State, Michael Roth.

He was replaced by Darius Semaška on 11 July 2017.

From 2017 to 2018 he was an advisor to the Lithuanian Prime Minister Saulius Skvernelis.

In 2019, he was the chairman of the government working group that prepared the funeral ceremonies for the remains of the January insurgents in Vilnius.

From 6 February 2018 to 10 April 2020, he was the first deputy chancellor of the government, he worked as First Deputy Chancellor in the Government Chancellery of Lithuania.

On 20 April 2020, Matulionis became the permanent representative to NATO. He held the position until 18 April 2025, when he was replaced by Darius Jauniškis.

== Personal life ==
Matulionis is married and has two children. He speaks English, German, Russian and Danish.
