= Jurgis Jungmeisteris =

Lithuanian military officer (1884–1949)

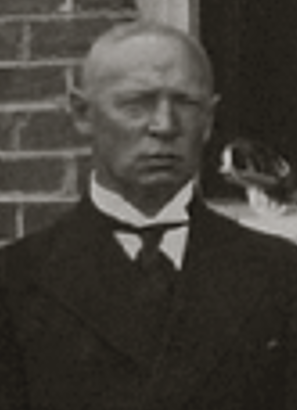
- Jurgis Jungmeisteris in 1930
- Born: October 30, 1884; Pasuosis, Russian Empire
- Died: 1949; Siberia, Soviet Union
- Occupation: Military officer
- Known for: Pioneering fencing in Lithuania
- Notable work: Fechtavimas espadronais (1926)

Jurgis Jungmeisteris (30 October 1884 – 1949) was a Lithuanian military officer who pioneered the sport of fencing in Lithuania.

== Biography ==
Jurgis Jungmeisteris was born on 30 October 1884 in the Pasuosis manor. Jungmeisters attended the Main Gymnastics and Fencing School of St. Petersburg. During the First World War, Jungmeisteris earned the rank of rotmistr within the Russian Imperial Army.

Jungmeisteris began his service in the Lithuanian Army by joining the 2nd Uhlan Regiment. In 1923, due to speaking the Lithuanian language poorly, Jungmeisteris was moved to the reserve. After improving his ability to speak the language, in 1924 Jungmeisteris began working as a fencing, rowing, and swimming instructor at the physical education center of the Higher Officers' Courses. That same year, in autumn, fencing as a sport was introduced into the physical training program of the Lithuanian military. The standard training programme was four months long. Later, fencing was included in the programme of the War School of Kaunas. Jungmeisteris also lectured at the State Theater School of Acting.

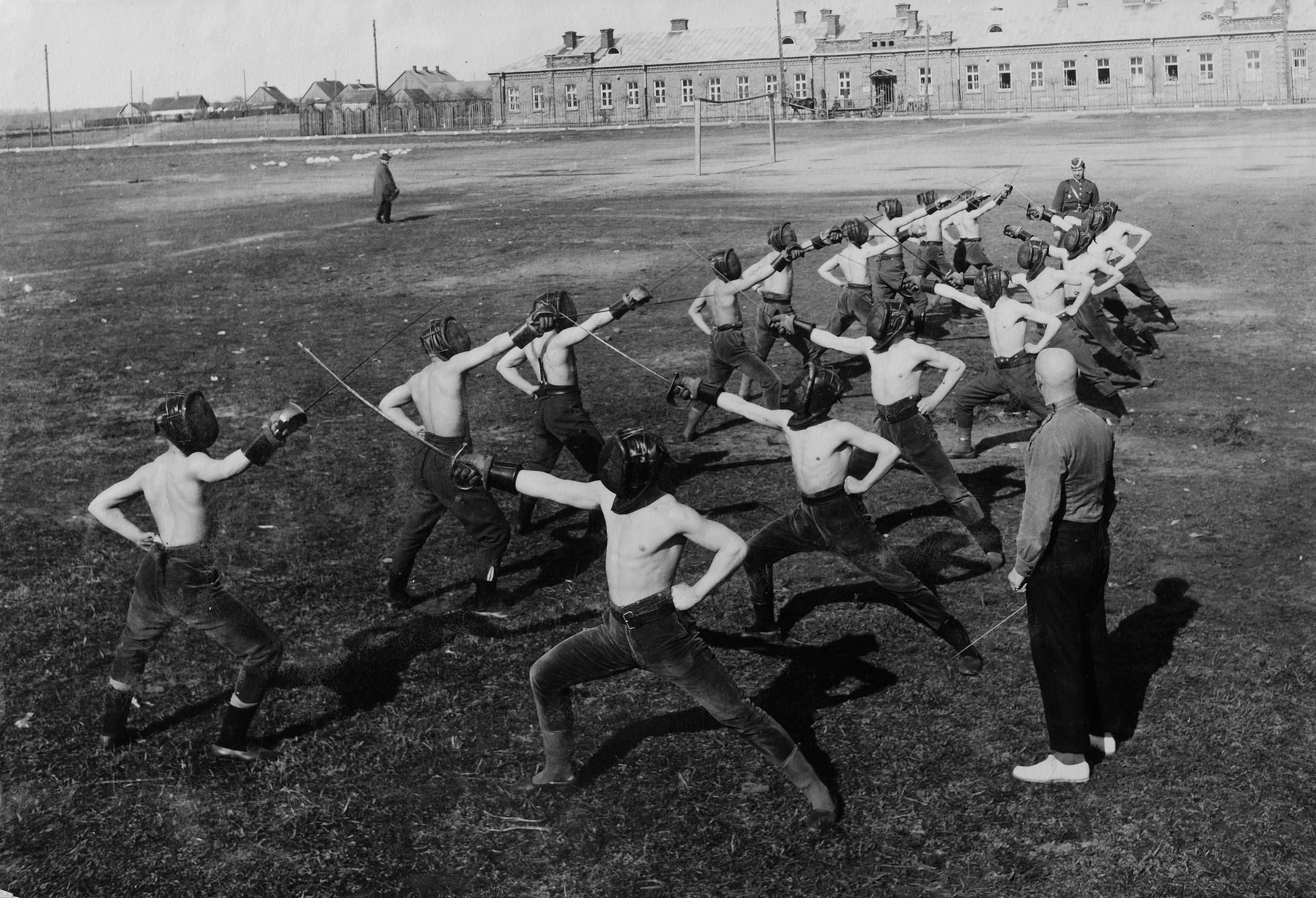
Lithuanian fencers of the War School of Kaunas, c. 1925

In 1926, Jungmeisteris published Fechtavimas espadronais, a textbook covering sabre fencing and the history of fencing. In it, Jungmeisteris claimed that duels in Greek legends and the medieval period were based on physical strength and dexterity, and that the beginnings of the art of weapon handling and the rules of fencing can be observed as early as antiquity. Fencing techniques in the textbook were based on the fencing school of Luigi Barbasetti and the St. Petersburg fencing school which Jungmeisteris attended. As the only fencing professional in his country, Jungmeisteris actively encouraged the practice of the sport:

"In what other sport do you need to constantly strain your thoughts, to solve problems so quickly, to be able to orient yourself in every situation in the shortest possible time, as in fencing? If the game of chess forces your brain to work, giving you up to one to two hours to solve a problem, then fencing in free combat gives you 1/10 of a second to solve the most serious problem. At the chessboard, you lose the game, but at the fencing board, you can lose your life."

Jungmeisteris died in 1949 in Siberia after being deported there by the Soviet government.
