= Vytautas Magnus University =

Public university in Kaunas, Lithuania

- Vytauto Didžiojo universitetas
- Latin: Universitas Vytauti Magni
- Type: Public
- Established: 1922; 104 years ago
- Affiliations: European Association for International Education; EUA, Campus Europae,
- Endowment: 92.98 million € (2024)
- Budget: 31.30 million € (2024)
- Rector magnificus: Ineta Dabašinskienė
- Academic staff: 481 (1,043 staff total)
- Students: 7,709
- Location: Kaunas, Lithuania; 54°53′54″N 23°54′50″E
- Colours: Maroon Dark Grey
- Website: vdu.lt

Vytautas Magnus University (VMU) (Lithuanian: Vytauto Didžiojo universitetas, VDU) is a public university in Kaunas, Lithuania. The university was founded in 1922 during the interwar period as an alternate national university.

Initially it was known as the University of Lithuania, but in 1930 the university was renamed to Vytautas Magnus University, commemorating the 500th anniversary of the death of the Lithuanian ruler Vytautas the Great, who is known for the nation's greatest historical expansion in the 15th century.

It is one of the leading universities of Lithuania, and has about 8,800 students, including Master's students and Ph.D. candidates There are a little over 1000 employees, including approximately 90 professors.

== History ==
=== Establishment of University ===
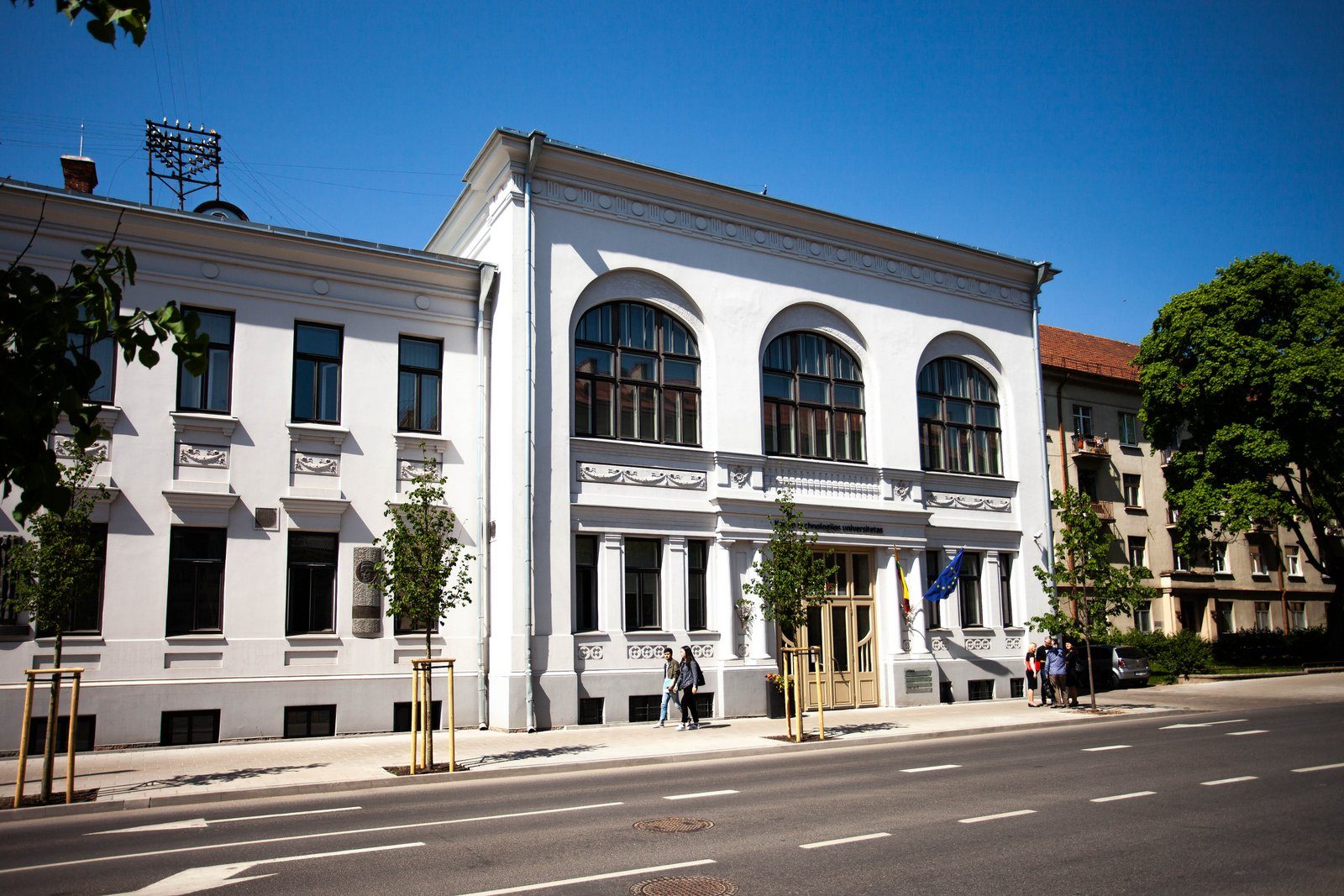
Building where Higher Courses were established, which would later become University of Lithuania

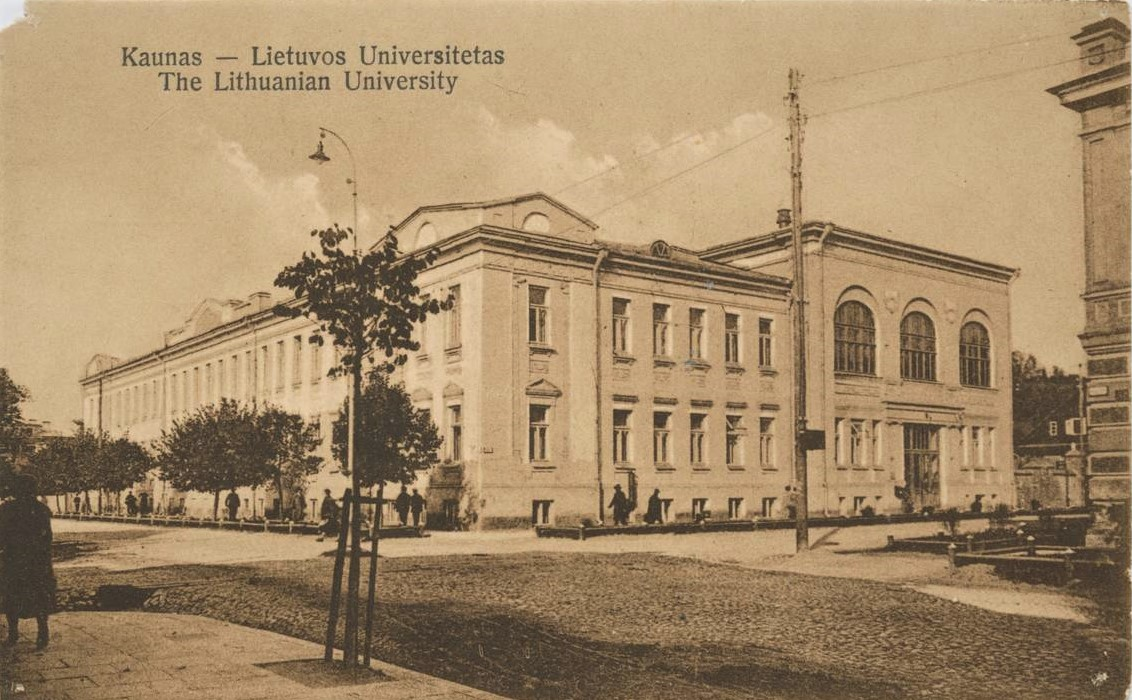
University of Lithuania in 1925

In 1918 with the establishment of the independent Republic of Lithuania, the State Council decided to reestablish Vilnius University. Since Vilnius was later under Polish administration and the Lithuanian government had to be transferred to Kaunas, this decision was not put into effect.

At the beginning of 1920, Higher Courses of Study were established in Kaunas, laying the foundation for the establishment of a university. The Lithuanian Cabinet of Ministers decided to establish the University of Lithuania in Kaunas, 13 February 1922. The ceremonial opening of the university took place 16 February 1922, while on the 12th of April the President of Lithuania confirmed the university's Statute along with six faculties: Theology-Philosophy, Humanities, Law, Mathematics and Sciences, Medicine and Technical Studies.

The affiliate Agricultural Academy was founded in 1924 on the basis of the Agronomy and Forestry sections of the Faculty of Mathematics and Sciences; in 1936 the Veterinary Academy was established in a similar fashion on the basis of the Veterinary section of the Faculty of Medicine.

On 7 June 1930, commemorating the 500th anniversary of the death of Vytautas the Great, the university was renamed in his honor (English: Vytautas Magnus University, Latin: Universitas Vytauti Magni).

=== World War II ===
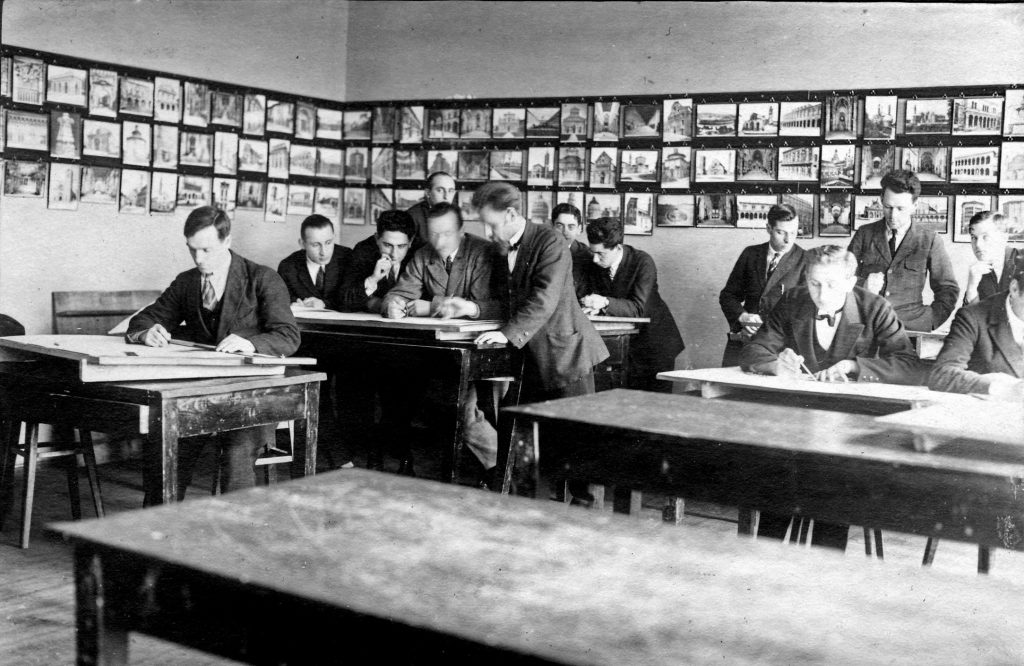
Lecture in the drawing room of the Technical Faculty in 1927

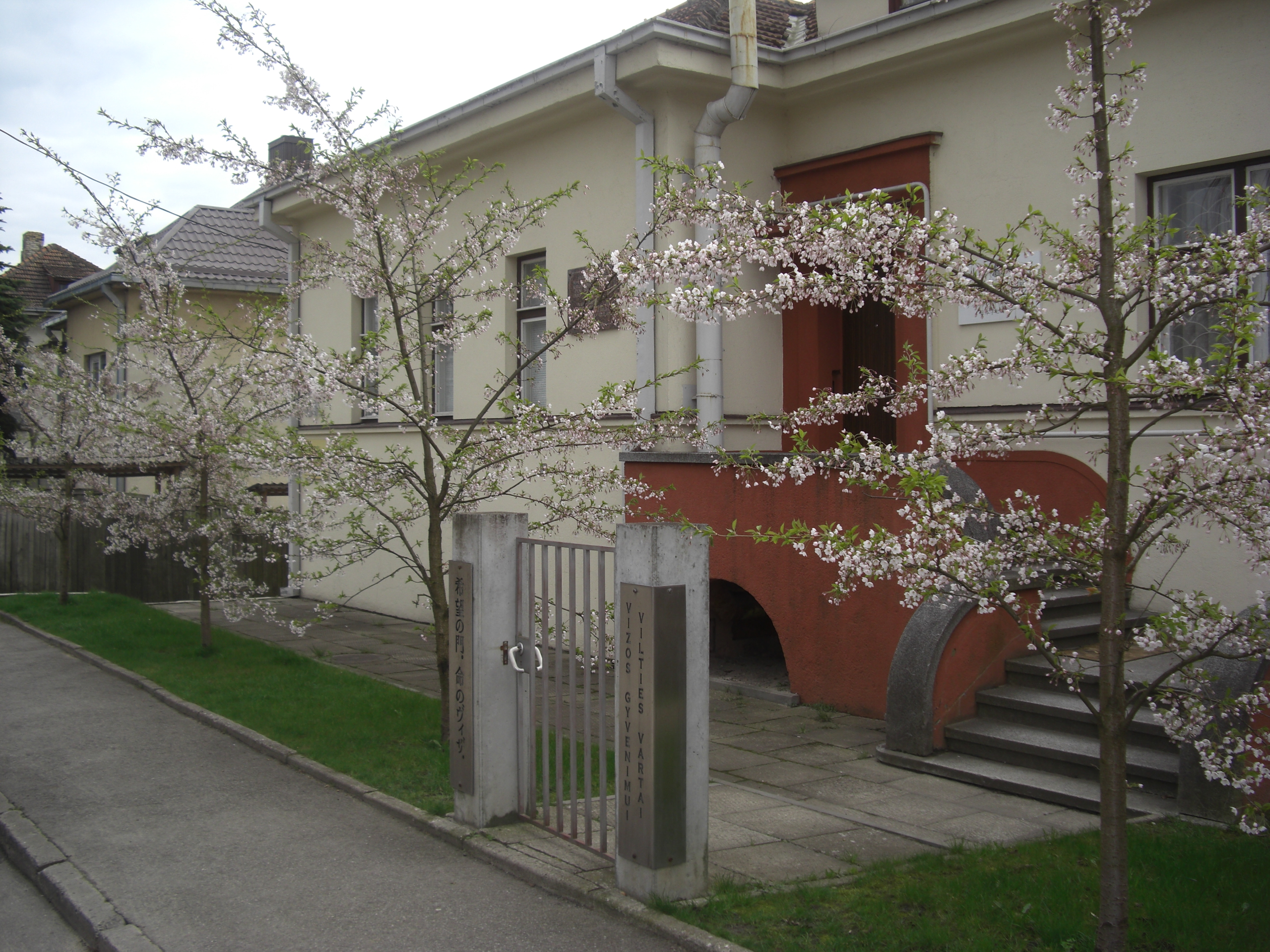
Sugihara House, VMU Centre for Asian Studies

In 1940, Vytautas Magnus University contributed to the reestablishment of Vilnius University. In the winter, the faculties of Humanities and Law were transferred to Vilnius whilst the Faculty of Mathematics and Sciences was moved in the summer. The occupation of Lithuania by the Soviet Union forced the university to be named the University of Kaunas in the summer of 1940. At the beginning of 1941, university professors took an active role in establishing the Lithuanian Academy of Sciences.

The Lithuanian Provisional Government restored the name of Vytautas Magnus to the university after the Nazi invasion of the Soviet Union in the summer of 1941. The German occupation government closed the university in March 1943, after Lithuanians refused to form an SS battalion.

The university was reopened by the Soviet authorities of Lithuania in autumn 1944. Four faculties of History-Philology, Medicine, Construction, and Technology were established. The transfer of the Faculty of Philosophy to Vilnius was the reason why the University of Kaunas was closed in the fall of 1949. The university was restructured into Kaunas Polytechnic Institute and the Kaunas Medical Institute on October 31, 1950.

=== Re-establishment of University ===
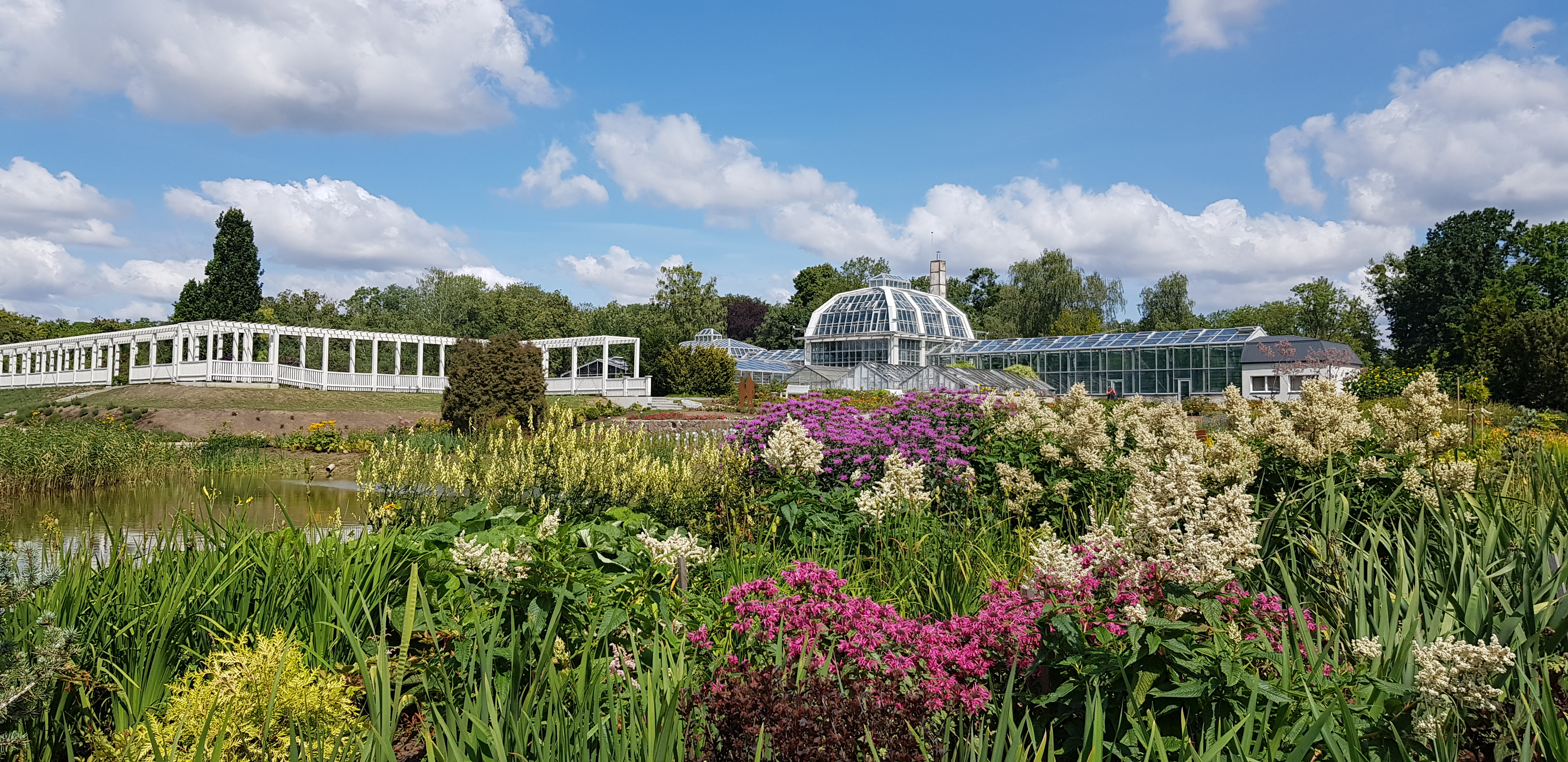
VMU Botanical Garden

Grand Hall of the Vytautas Magnus University in Kaunas, Lithuania

The government passed the law on re-establishing the Vytautas Magnus University on 4 July 1989 and the cabinet registered the temporary Statute later that month. The first academic year began in the university's re-established Faculties of Economics, Humanities and Sciences on 1 September 1989.

The re-established university was the second in then Soviet-occupied Lithuania, and the first school of higher education that was independent of governmental institutions. The most important principle in the university's activity became academic freedom, while its main purpose was to prepare graduates with a broad humanistic orientation for Lithuania's needs in research, culture, education and economy.

A common program of study in humanities and general education for the first two years of study for all students appeared in 1990. Its aim was to develop well-rounded individuals who were free and creative.

In 1991 the university was the first in Lithuania to establish in a system of study based on several levels, the completion of which resulted in the granting of Bachelor's or Master's degrees, as well as Doctoral degrees. The feature of this university still remains exceptional in Lithuania today: this is a liberal policy for studies, according to which students are admitted not into specific specializations but into fields of study.

The students themselves put together their plan of study and make a final choice of their program after the first two years of study. Particular attention is given to foreign languages and computer skills, making this university different from other schools of higher education in the country.

During the university's first decade the number of students and teachers grew more than twenty times. It has become the center for academic work in the Humanities and Social Sciences, Theology and Fine Arts, Political Sciences and Law in Kaunas. Modern programs have been expanding in Informatics, Environmental Sciences, Biology, Mathematics and Physics.

Master's and Doctoral studies became a priority at the university and demanded a pedagogical staff with high qualifications. Therefore, the university invited to its classrooms and laboratories the most celebrated of scholars from Lithuania's research institutes, creating in 1993 the first Research and Study Association in Lithuania. Ten Lithuanian research institutes formed this association together with the university: the Institutes for Lithuanian History, Lithuanian Language, Lithuanian Literature and Folklore, Lithuanian Philosophy and Sociology, biochemistry, Mathematics and Informatics, Semiconductor Physics, Psychophysiology and Rehabilitation, Architecture and Civil Engineering, and Lithuanian Forestry.

The university has the right to grant doctoral degrees in nineteen scholarly fields and their branches and the Doctor Habilitus in eight fields. The pedagogical titles of professor and associate professor may be granted in the fields of Humanities, Social Sciences, Physics and Biomedicine.

== Structure ==
The university has the following subdivisions:

- Faculty of Economics and Management
- Faculty of Natural Sciences
- Faculty of Humanities
- Faculty of Informatics
- Faculty of Catholic Theology
- Faculty of Arts
- Faculty of Political Science and Diplomacy
- Faculty of Social Sciences
- Faculty of Law
- Institute of Innovative Studies
- Institute of Foreign Languages
- Agriculture Academy
  - Faculty of Agronomy
  - Faculty of Bioeconomy Development
  - Faculty of Forest Sciences and Ecology
  - Faculty of Engineering
- Education Academy
- Music Academy
- Botanical Garden
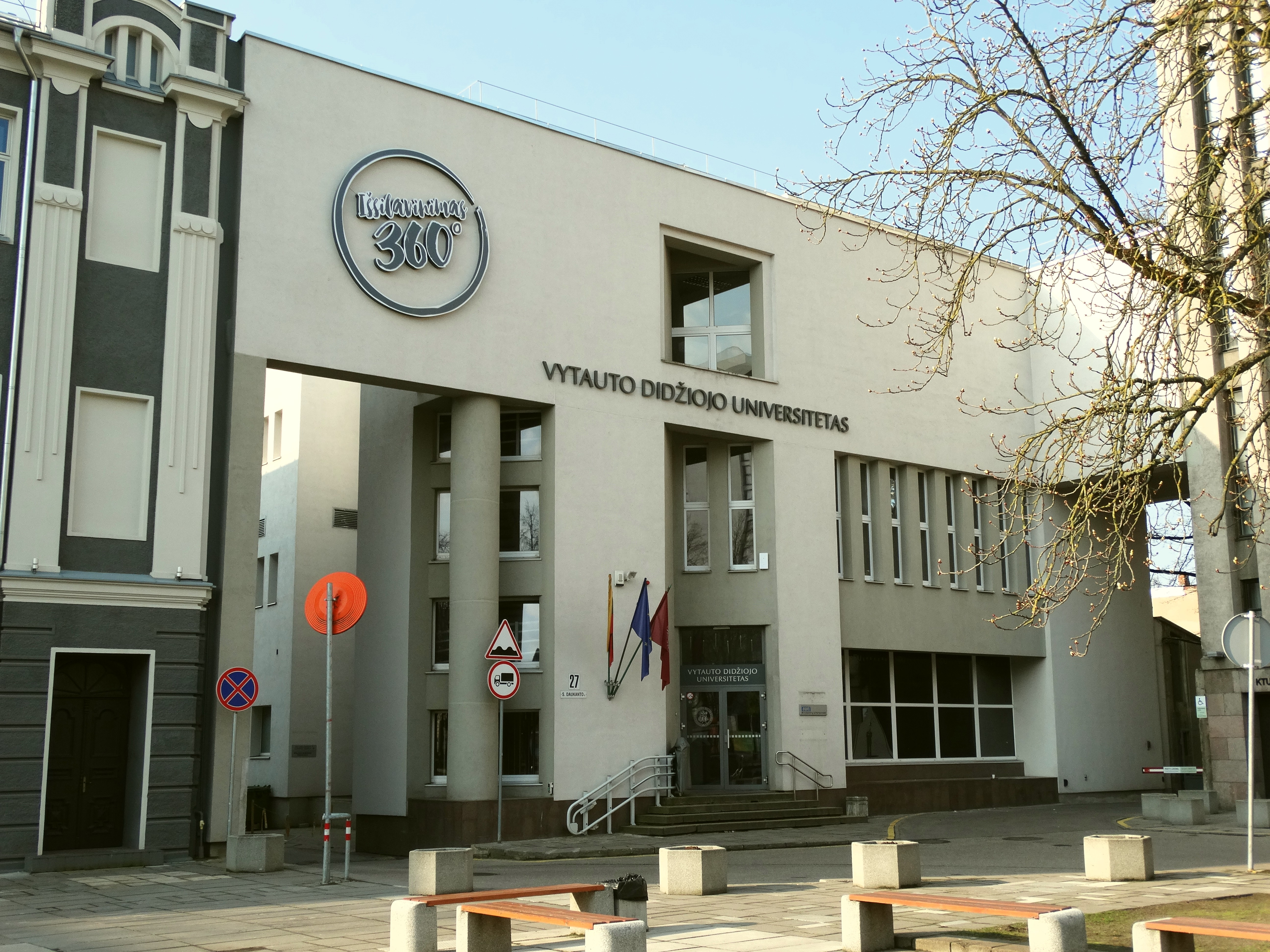
Student centre

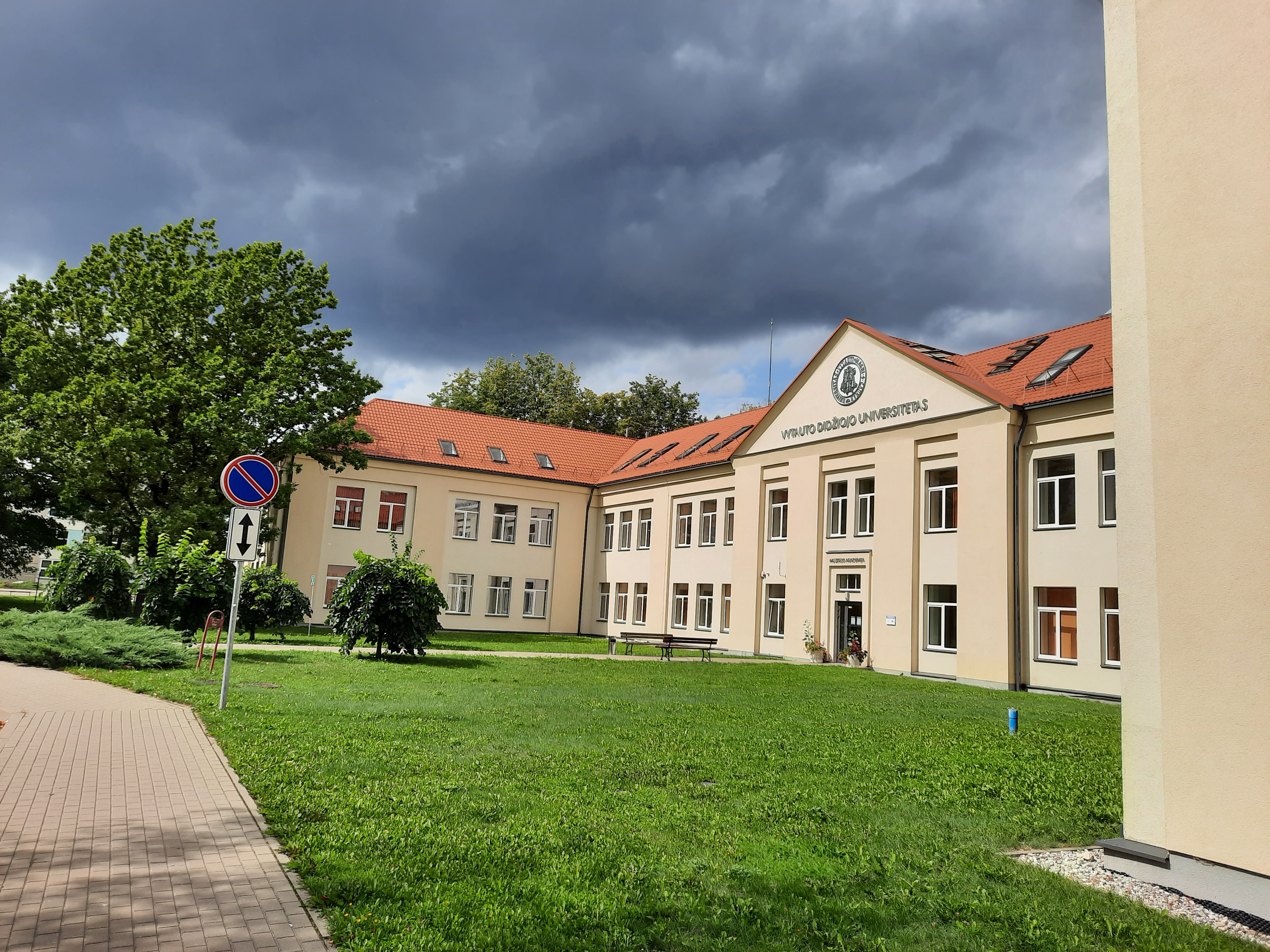
Music Academy

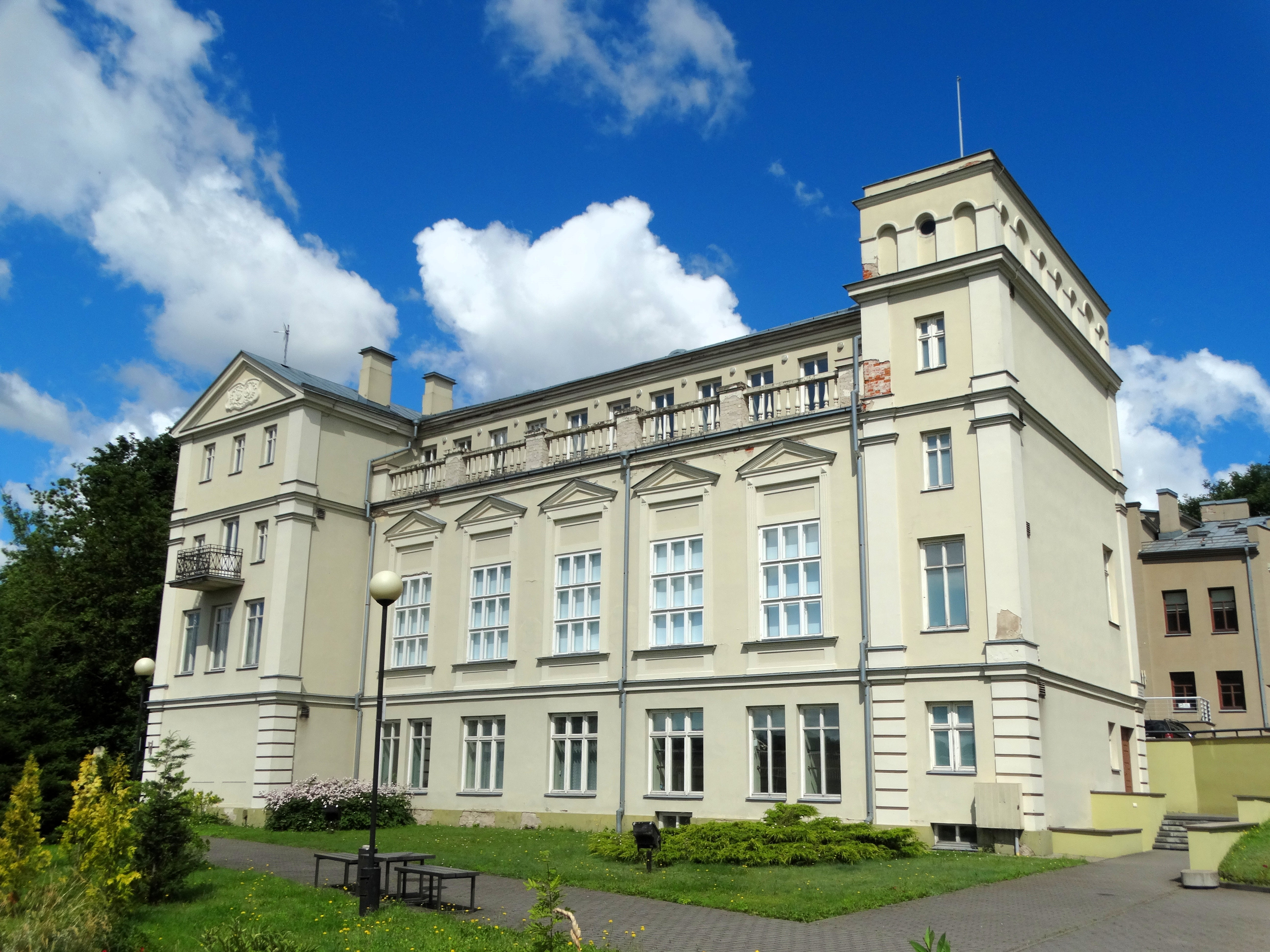
Faculty of Catholic Theology

Faculty of Economics and Management

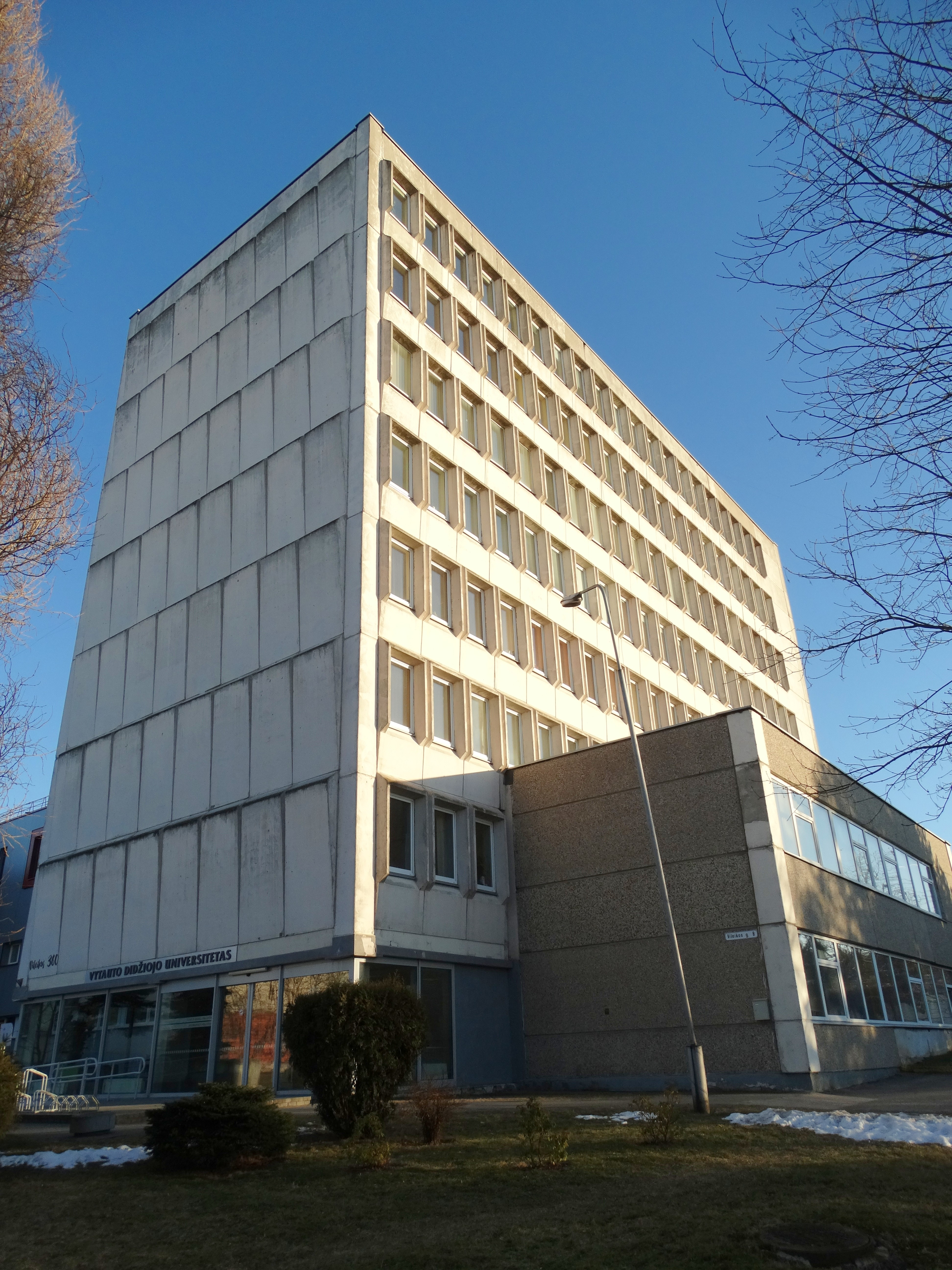
Faculty of Natural Sciences / Faculty of Informatics

Faculty of Humanities / Faculty of Political Science and Diplomacy

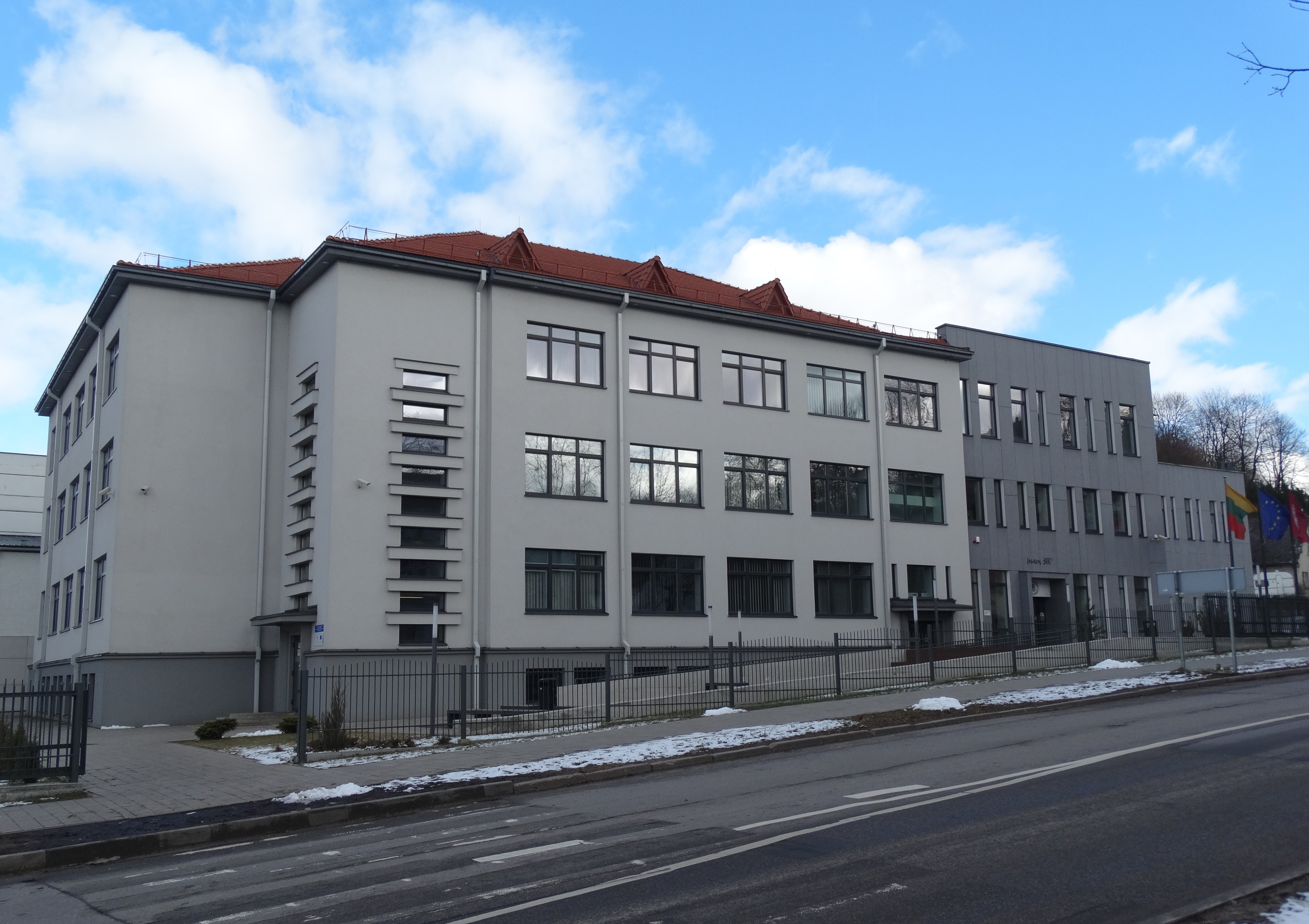
Faculty of Social Sciences / Faculty of Law

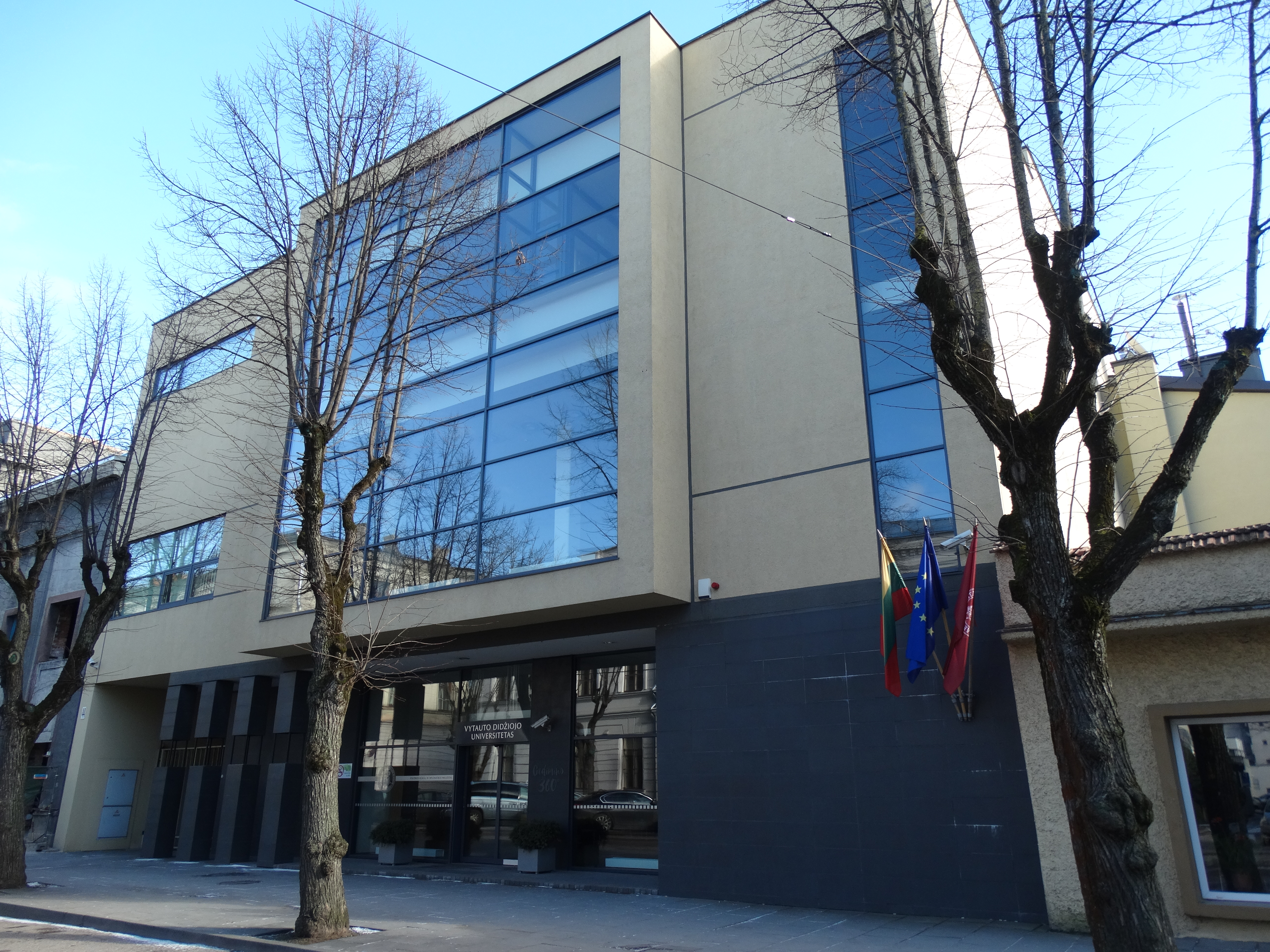
Institute of Foreign Languages

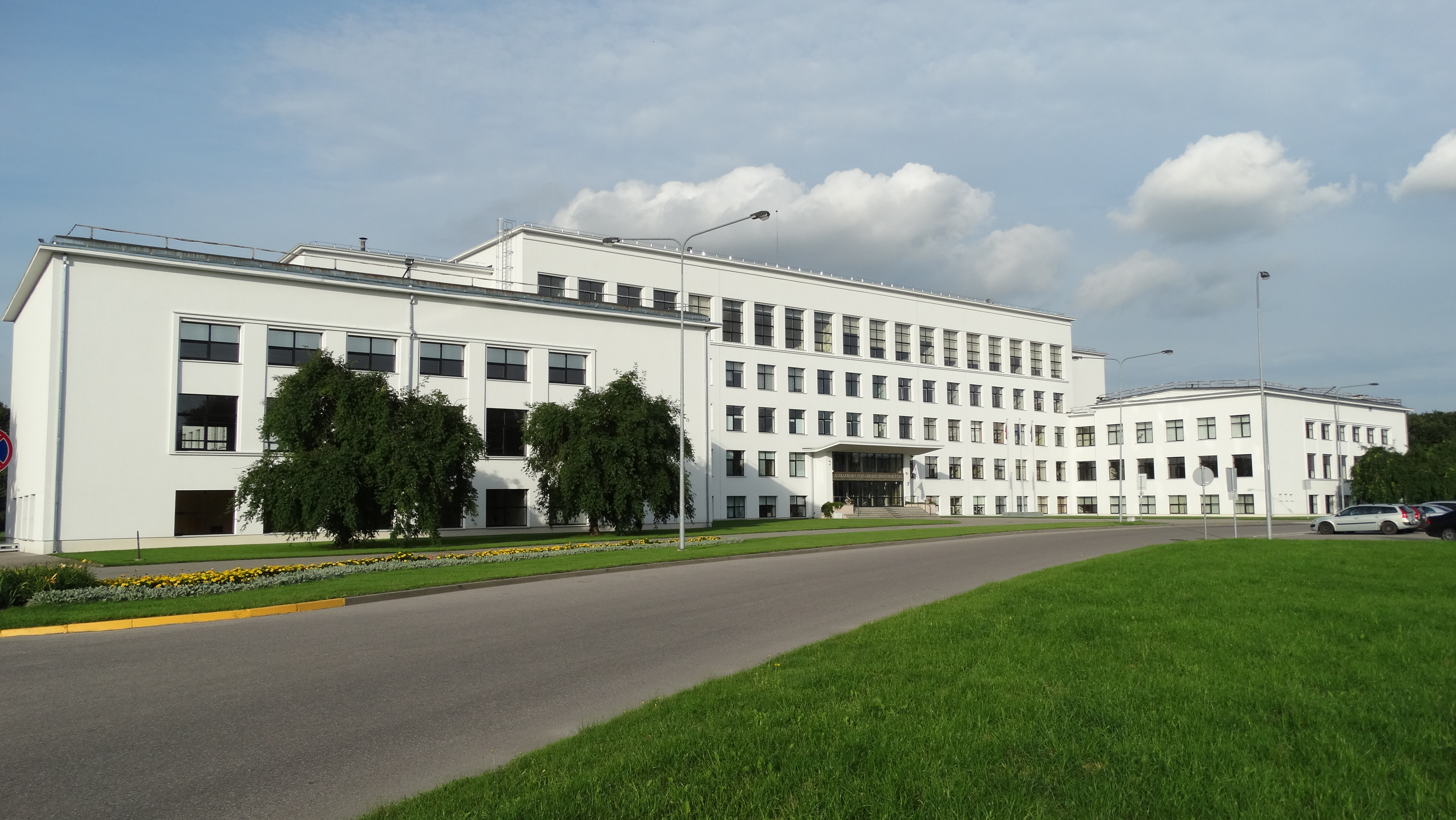
Academy of Agriculture

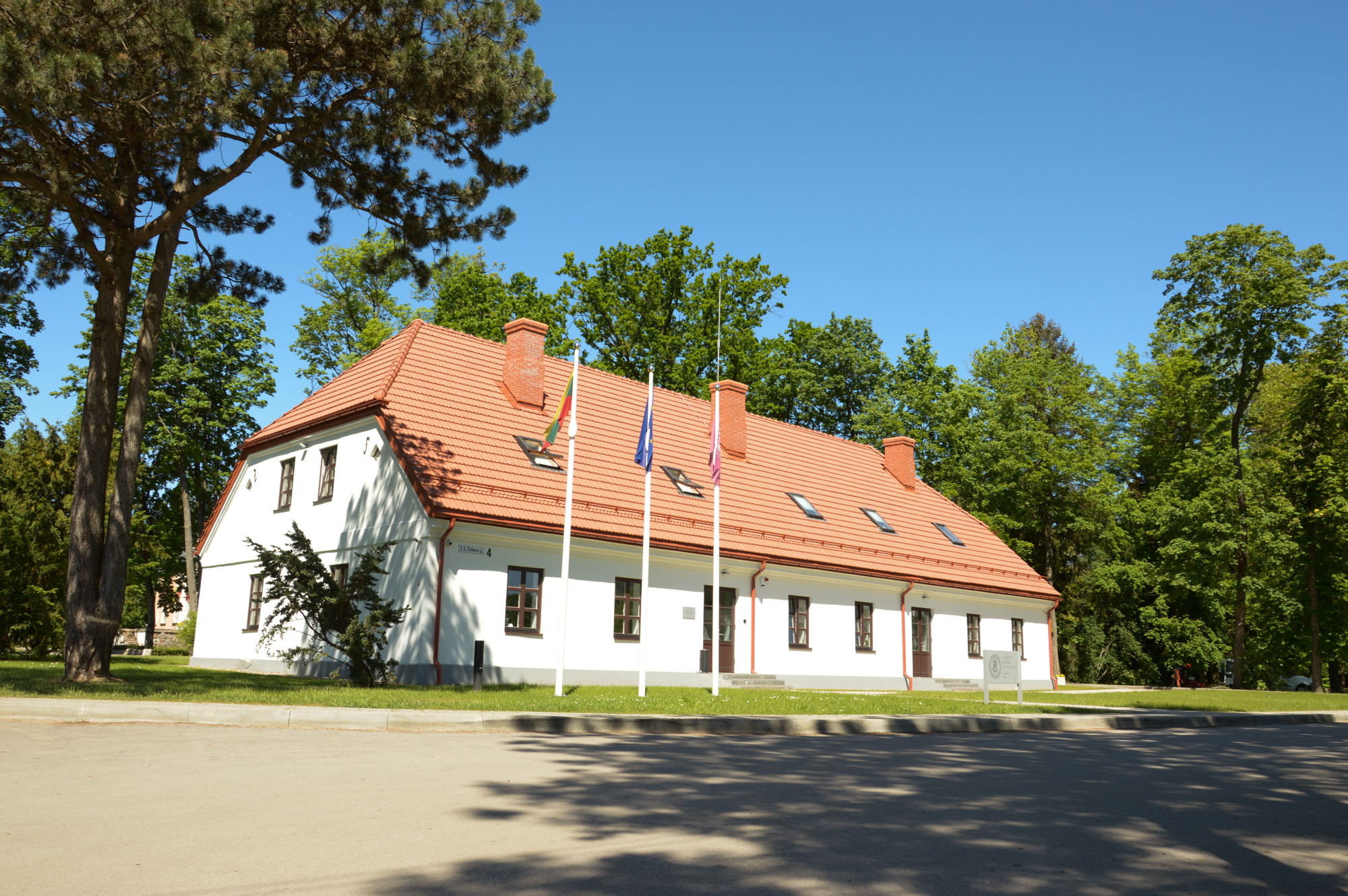
Botanical Garden

== Ranking ==
University rankings

Global – Overall
- QS World: 741-750 (2026)
- THE World: 1201–1500 (2024)

Regional – Overall
- QS Emerging Europe and Central Asia: 61 (2022)

Vytautas Magnus University is currently ranked 801-1000 among World top universities by 2020 QS World University Rankings.

== International relations ==
The university has ties with numerous universities of North America and Europe, as well as East Asia.

Special student and teacher exchange programs have been set up with the following universities:

- In Europe: University of Bergen (Norway), ADA University (Azerbaijan), Roskilde (Denmark), Gothenburg, Linköping and Växjö (Sweden), Greifswald, Hohenheim, Zittau/Görlitz (Germany), Poitiers, Du Maine, Pierre et Marie Curie University (France), UBS Vannes (France), Bologna, Parma, SDA Bocconi, University of Cagliari, University of Urbino (Italy), Aveiro (Portugal), University of Torun (Poland) and Tbilisi State University (Georgia);
- In the United States: Alabama, Fordham, Creighton, Loyola, Seton Hall universities;
- In East Asia: Kansai Gaidai, Akita International University, Waseda and the International Christian University (Japan), Kyung Hee University, Chung-Ang University, and Kangwon National University (South Korea).

A program in Baltic Studies for foreign students was initiated at the university in 1997.

It is a member of the European Colleges of Liberal Arts and Sciences.

== Club activities ==
Questions concerning students' academic, social and cultural rights are resolved through the Student Council. About thirty student corporations and clubs are active in the university. The university's artistic groups – the Women's Chamber Choir, the dance group "Žilvitis", the folkloric ensemble "Linago" and the Rhetorical Theatre – have won various contests in Lithuania and abroad.

== Notable professors and alumni of Vytautas Magnus University ==
- Jurgis Blekaitis, Lithuanian American poet, former editor for the Voice of America
- Bernardas Brazdžionis, poet
- Leonidas Donskis, philosopher
- Jacob Gens, Commandant of the Vilna Ghetto
- Klawdziy Duzh-Dushewski, Belarusian architect, diplomat and journalist
- Reuben Efron, CIA employee
- Algirdas Julien Greimas, French-Lithuanian literary scientist
- Jonas Jablonskis, linguist
- Paulius Jankūnas, basketball player
- Mantas Kalnietis, basketball player
- Vincas Krėvė-Mickevičius, writer, philologist, Assistant Professor at University of Pennsylvania
- Ivan Lappo, historian
- Martin Lings, English writer
- Jonas Mačiulis, basketball player
- Salomėja Nėris, poet
- Marija Rudzinskaitė-Arcimavičienė, Lithuanian Orientalist, Egyptologist and educator
- Adolfas Šapoka, historian
- Constantin Andreas von Regel, horticulturalist and botanist
- Jonas Vabalas-Gudaitis, psychologist, educator, and agronomist
- Robert van Voren, Dutch human rights activist and political scientist
