= Jurgis Jurgelis =

Lithuanian politician

Jurgis Jurgelis (born 9 August 1942 in Šiauliai, Generalbezirk Litauen, Reichskommissariat Ostland) is a mathematics teacher, politician, and signatory of the 1990 Act of the Re-Establishment of the State of Lithuania.
