= Antanas =

- Pronunciation: Lithuanian pronunciation: [ɐnˈtaːnɐs]
- Gender: Male
- Name day: 13 June

Origin
- Region of origin: Lithuania

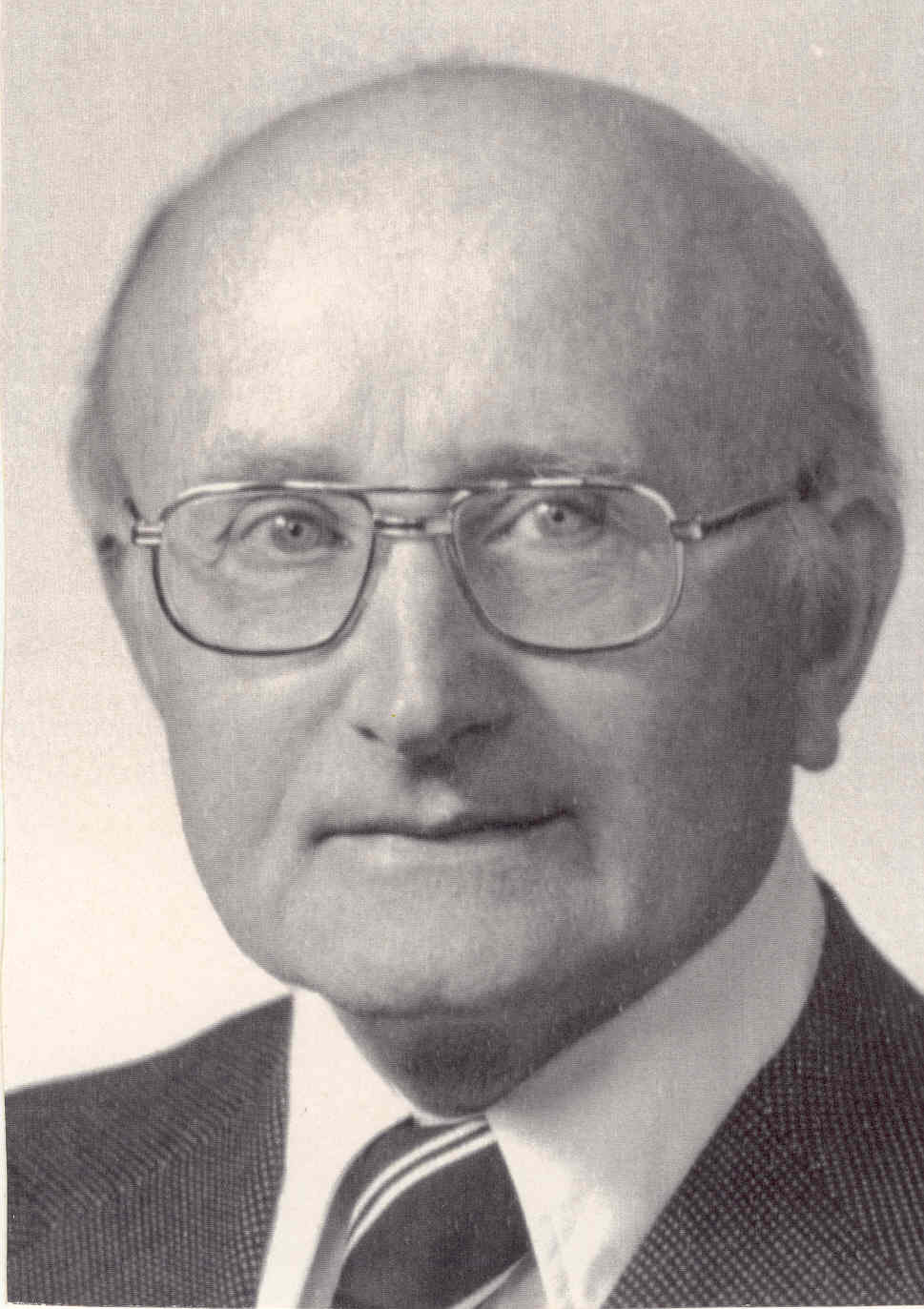
From the family photographs of Antanas Vaiciulaitis, from the 1980s.

Antanas is a Lithuanian masculine given name derived from Antonius that is equivalent to Anthony in Lithuania. It may refer to:

- Antanas Andrijauskas (born 1948), Lithuanian philosopher
- Antanas Bakšys (1923–1953), Lithuanian anti-Soviet partisan
- Antanas Bagdonavičius (1938–2024), Lithuanian rower and Olympic medalist
- Antanas Baranauskas (1835–1902), Lithuanian poet, mathematician and catholic bishop
- Antanas Baskas (born 1936), Lithuanian politician
- Antanas Bataitis (1854–1932), Lithuanian book smuggler
- Antanas Belazaras (1913–1976), Lithuanian composer
- Antanas Būdvytis (1928–1998), Lithuanian politician
- Antanas Rimvydas Čaplinskas (1939–2011), Lithuanian historian
- Antanas Algimantas Česnauskis (1936–2008), Lithuanian chess player
- Antanas Čikotas (1951–2021), Lithuanian rower
- Antanas Ričardas Druvė (1867–1919), Lithuanian military officer and colonel in Russian military
- Antanas Gaušas (1901–1964), Lithuanian military person
- Antanas Gustaitis (1898–1941), Lithuanian military general, aviator and aerospace engineer
- Antanas Guoga (Tony G) (born 1973), Lithuanian-born Australian businessman and professional poker player
- Antanas Impulevičius (1907–1970), Lithuanian Army officer
- Antanas Janauskas (1937–2016), Lithuanian animation film director, designer and writer
- Antanas Jaroševičius (1870–1956), Lithuanian painter
- Antanas Juknevičius (born 1974), Lithuanian rally driver
- Antanas Juozapavičius (1894–1919), first officer of the Army of the Republic of Lithuania
- Antanas Juška (1819–1880), Lithuanian Roman Catholic pastor, lexicographer, folklorist, and musicologist
- Antanas Kandrotas (born 1980), Lithuanian anti-LGBT activist
- Antanas Karoblis (1940–2007), Lithuanian politician
- Antanas Karosas (1856–1947), Roman Catholic bishop
- Antanas Kavaliauskas (born 1984), Lithuanian basketball player
- Antanas Klimas (1924–2016), Lithuanian professor, onomastician and comparative linguist
- Antanas Kraujelis (1928–1965), Lithuanian partisan and the last partisan of the region of Aukštaitija
- Antanas Kriščiukaitis (1864–1933), Lithuanian writer and judge
- Antanas Krištopaitis (1921–2011), Lithuanian painter, ethnographer and social activist
- Antanas Lapė (1961–2007), Lithuanian Catholic priest
- Antanas Lingis (1905–1941), Lithuanian footballer
- Antanas Maceina (1908–1987), Lithuanian philosopher, existentialist, educator, theologian, and poet
- Antanas Mackevičius (1828–1863), Lithuanian priest and an initiator and leader of the 1863 January Uprising
- Antanas Merkys (1887–1955), Lithuanian politician, former Prime Minister Lithuania
- Antanas Mikėnas (1924–1994), Lithuanian track and field athlete and Olympic medalist
- Antanas Milukas (1871–1943), Lithuanian Roman Catholic priest, book publisher and newspaper editor
- Antanas Mockus (born 1952), Colombian mathematician, philosopher, and politician
- Antanas Nedzinskas (born 1981), Lithuanian politician
- Antanas Olšauskas (1863–1942), Lithuanian American publisher
- Antanas Pakerys (born 1940), Lithuanian linguist
- Antanas Pocius (1913–1983), Lithuanian choirmaster, organist and composer
- Antanas Poška (1903–1992), Lithuanian traveler and anthropologist
- Antanas Purėnas (1881–1962), Lithuanian organic chemist and politician
- Antanas Račas (1940–2014), Lithuanian politician
- Antanas Račiūnas (1905–1984), Lithuanian and Soviet composer and pedagogue
- Antanas Rėklaitis (1897–1977), Lithuanian colonel and lecturer
- Antanas Samuolis (1899–1942), Lithuanian painter
- Antanas Šileika (born 1953), Canadian novelist and critic
- Antanas Sireika (born 1956), Lithuanian basketball coach
- Antanas Škėma (1910–1961), Lithuanian writer, stage actor and director
- Antanas Smetona (1874–1944), Lithuanian politician, former President of Lithuania
- Antanas Sniečkus (1903–1974), Lithuanian communist politician
- Antanas Stapulionis (1893–1978), Lithuanian lieutenant colonel and chief of the Panevėžys Staff
- Antanas Strazdas (1760–1833) Lithuanian priest
- Antanas Šurna (1939–2014), Lithuanian actor
- Antanas Sutkus (born 1939), Lithuanian photographer
- Antanas Tumėnas (1880–1946), Lithuanian politician
- Antanas Vaičiulaitis (1906–1992), Lithuanian writer
- Antanas Vaičius (1926–2008), Lithuanian priest
- Antanas Valionis (born 1950), Lithuanian politician
- Antanas Varnelis (c. 1971–1994), Lithuanian serial killer
- Antanas Vaupšas (1936–2017), Lithuanian athlete
- Antanas Venclova (1906–1971), Lithuanian and Soviet politician, poet, journalist and translator
- Antanas Vienažindys (1841–1892), Lithuanian poet
- Antanas Vienuolis (1882–1957), Lithuanian writer and dramatist
- Antanas Vileišis (1856–1919), Lithuanian politician
- Antanas Vinkus (born 1942), Lithuanian diplomat and politician
- Antanas Vivulskis (1877–1919), Polish-Lithuanian architect and sculptor
- Antanas Zapolskis (born 1962), Lithuanian chess player
- Antanas Žmuidzinavičius (1876–1966), Lithuanian painter and artist
