= Antanas Ričardas Druvė =

Lithuanian military officer (1865–1919)

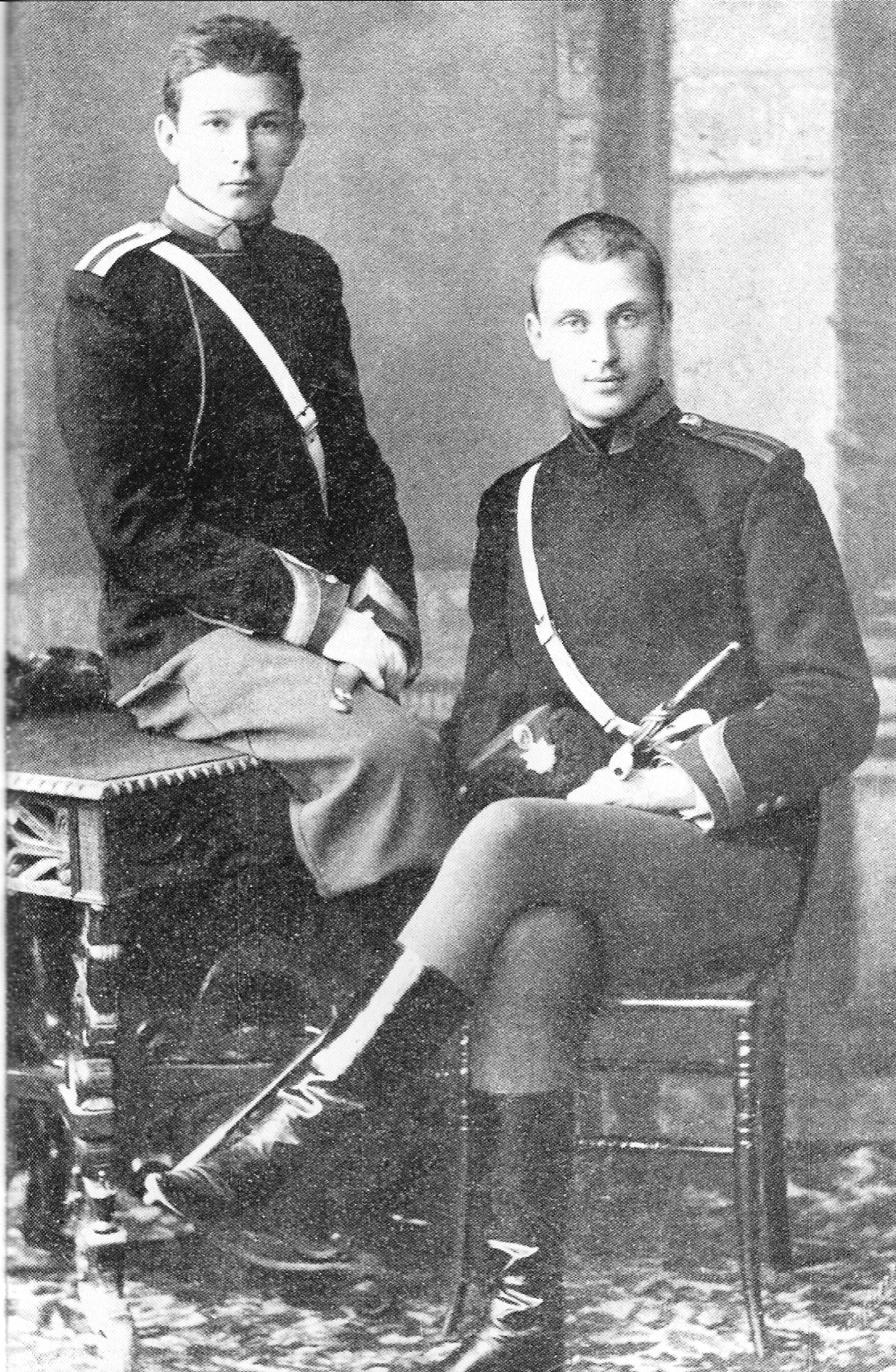
- Druvė (left) alongside fellow student Carl Gustaf Emil Mannerheim in Nicholas Cavalry College, St. Petersburg, late 1880s.
- Born: 1 January 1865; Pavirvytys estate, Tryškiai Parish
- Died: 17 February 1919 (aged 54)
- Military career
- Allegiance: Russian Empire (1887–1917); Lithuania (1919)
- Branch: General Staff
- Rank: Colonel
- Conflicts: Russo-Japanese War; World War I; Lithuanian Wars of Independence

Antanas Ričardas Druvė (Russian: Антон-Ричард Иосифович Друве, romanized: Anton-Richard Iosifovich Druve; 1 January 1865 – 17 February 1919) was a Lithuanian military officer and a colonel in the Imperial Russian Stavka. Druvė was born in the Manor of Pavirvytis (now Lithuania), which belonged to the Lithuanian noble Šemeta family.

== Background ==
During the French invasion of Russia, the sick French lieutenant Pierre Drouvet stayed in the manor. He was nursed by Morta, the landowner's only daughter; and they fell in love. Pierre Drouvet and Morta married; and together with the Grande Armée, having experienced various adventures on the way, went to the French region of Burgundy. After two decades, following her parents' request, Morta and Drouvet returned to Pavirvytis. Antanas Druvė was this couple's grandson.

== Military career ==
Druvė received his general education at the 3rd Gymnasium of Warsaw. He entered the Imperial Russian Army on 11 September 1887 at age 22. From 1887 to 1889, Druvė studied at the Nicholas Cavalry School. While there, he became a friend of Carl Gustaf Emil Mannerheim, the future president of Finland. Druvė later finished his military education at the General Staff Academy.

Druvė became a cornet in 1888, a lieutenant in 1892, a Stabs-kapitan in 1898 and a captain in 1900. He commanded a squadron for 7 years. Druvė was part of the 32nd Dragoon Regiment. During the Russo-Japanese War of 1905, Druvė was seriously wounded. The 32nd Dragoons were renamed as the 11th Uhlan Regiment in 1907. Druvė was promoted to lieutenant colonel of the 11th Uhlan Regiment in 1912 for his distinction in imperial service.

=== World War I ===
During World War I, in the autumn of 1915, Druvė led a cavalry unit where he distinguished himself in the fighting against the Imperial German Army near the Daugava River. According to the vle.lt, it was the 43rd Cavalry Regiment. However, according to the ria1914.info, Druvė served only in the 32nd Dragoon, later renamed the 11th Uhlan Regiment. On 28 December 1915, he was promoted to colonel of the 11th Uhlan Regiment.

From 14 July 1916, Druvė served in the reserve of ranks at the headquarters of the Kiev Military District. He also served as an officer in the Northwestern Front's Headquarters section for operations.

=== Lithuanian Wars of Independence ===
Encouraged by Povilas Plechavičius, Druve secretly returned to Lithuania in January 1919. He helped Plechavičius organize anti-Communist Lithuanian partisans in the towns of Eigirdžiai, Raudėnai, Tryškiai and Ubiškė. While visiting his home estate, Druvė was caught and killed by the Red Army on 17 February 1919.

== Awards ==
- Order of Saint Stanislaus, 3rd Class in 1894
- Order of Saint Anna, 3rd Class on 2 March 1908
- Order of Saint Stanislaus, 2nd Class with swords on 13 April 1915
- Saint George Sword on 10 November 1915

== Sources ==
- Michalauskas, Valdemaras (2004). "Antanas Ričardas Druvė". Visuotinė lietuvių enciklopedija. Vol. V: Dis-Fatva. Vilnius: Mokslo ir enciklopedijų leidybos institutas.
