= Dapšioniai =

Village in Lithuania

- Village
- Location of Dapšioniai
- Coordinates: 55°45′18″N 23°58′48″E
- Country: Lithuania
- Ethnographic region: Samogitia
- County: Šiauliai County
- Municipality: Radviliškis District Municipality

Population (2021)
  - Total: 70
- Time zone: UTC+2 (EET)
  - Summer (DST): UTC+3 (EEST)

Dapšioniai is a village in the Radviliškis district in Lithuania, 3 kilometers northwest of Beinorava. The village is home to the Dievo Apvaizdos Bažnyčia, a Neoclassical church, as well as the Dapšionių ąžuolas, an oak tree 23 meters in height. The tree is under protection as an object of natural heritage of the state.

2 kilometers east of Beinorava is the Dapšioniai railway station, covering the Radviliškis—Daugpilis railway, although it is out of service.

== History ==
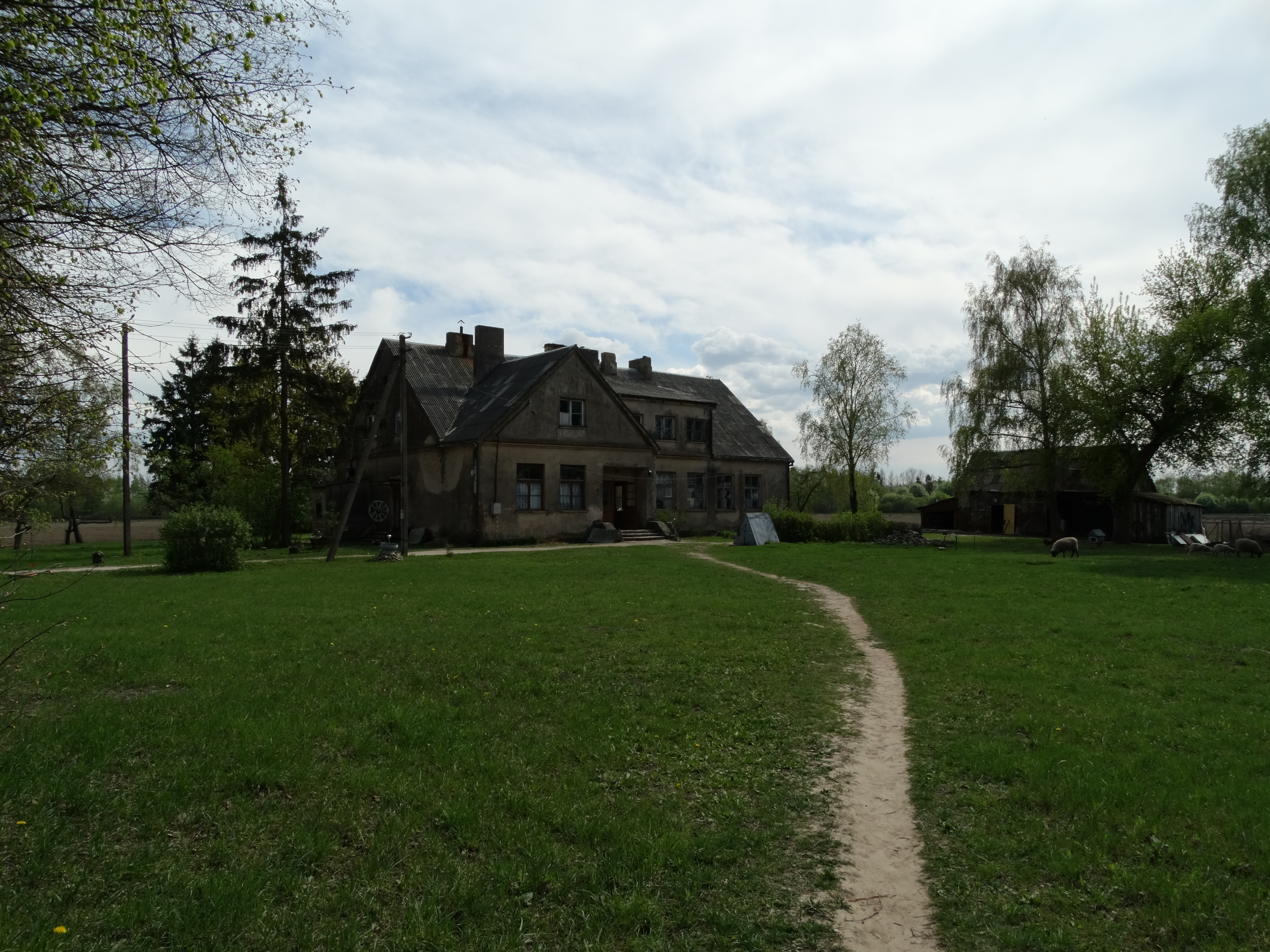
Former school

After the partition of the Polish-Lithuanian Commonwealth, the place administratively belonged to the Vilna Governorate, and to the Kovno Governorate since 1843. In 1829 stone foundations of the church were built by the funds of local landowner Wincenty Pereszczako. At some point the local manor was owned by the Blinstruby z Towtwila (Blinstrubiai iš Tautvilo or just Blinstrubiai) family. The estate then was owned by the Matuszewicz family of the Łabędź coat of arms. First owned by treasurer of Livonia Michal Wladyslawowicz Matuszewicz, and then by his grandson Jakub Jakubowicz, the estate was eventually sold to Mateusz Sawicki. In 1817 the estate belonged to Józef Sawicki. A school was built before the First World War, however, the parish gradually disintegrated and only began to be referred to as a parish by church records. From 1905, priests would come to do hold services. After Lithuanian independence in 1918, the place belonged to the Smilgiai district municipality. From 1919 to 1939 the estate was held by Hipolit Pereszczako and Sabina Januszewska. Dapšioniai housed its own Riflemen's Union squad, postal agency, choir, and school. In 1934 Martnyas Venclova became the permanent priest of the church, repairing it, building a parish hall and fixing the organs. 205 people lived in Dapšioniai in 1936. During the Soviet occupation of Lithuania, the area belonged to the Šeduva district.

== Population ==
1902	1923	1959	1970	1979	1989	2001	2011	2021
189	216	171	154	114	102	101	80	70

== Notable people ==
Domas Cesevičius, a Lithuanian economist, journalist, and publicist was born in Dapšioniai on 12 November 1902.
