= Vinkus =

Vinkus may refer to:

- Antanas Vinkus, Lithuanian diplomat
- Vinkus, an area in the fictional Winkie Country in the Land of Oz
