= Rimantas Šidlauskas =

Lithuanian diplomat (1962–2022)

Rimantas Šidlauskas (14 June 1962 – 12 September 2022) was a Lithuanian diplomat who was the Ambassador Extraordinary and Plenipotentiary of the Republic of Lithuania to the Russian Federation.

Preceded by dr. Zenonas Namavičius	Ambassador of Lithuania to Russia; 2002–2008	Succeeded by Antanas Vinkus
