= Antanas Bataitis =

Lithuanian book smuggler (1854–1932)

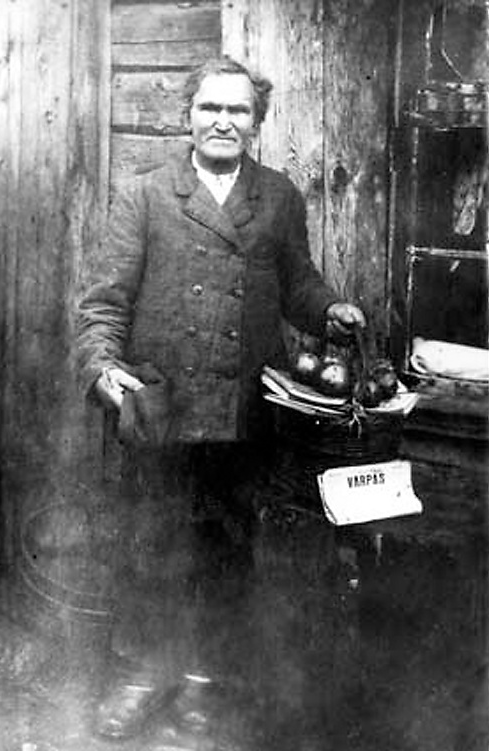
- Born: 13 June 1854; Valiliškiai, Russian Empire
- Died: 12 March 1932 (aged 77); Smilgiai, Lithuania
- Burial place: Smilgiai Cemetery
- Occupations: Bookbinder, book smuggler
- Years active: 1882–1904
- Spouse: Agota Guokienė
- Children: 8

Antanas Bataitis (13 June 1854 – 12 March 1932) was a Lithuanian book smuggler during the time of the Lithuanian press ban in the area around Smilgiai. He also worked as a bookbinder.

== Biography ==
=== Early life ===
Antanas Bataitis was born in the village of Valiliškiai in the Panevėžys district of Lithuania, as the first son of Motiejus Bataitis and Agnietė Bataitienė (née Jankevičiūtė). Growing up in the parish refuge of his poor family, he was taught to read Lithuanian by his mother.

=== Book smuggling years ===
Up until the age of 28, Bataitis worked at the parish church hospital. Priest Mykolas Opulskis taught him to write in Lithuanian and, around 1882, encouraged Bataitis to collect Cyrillic-print books from the people, burn them, and give them ones printed in Lithuanian. Shortly, Bataitis started book smuggling from Prussia. On his first trip, he lost his cart and horse and nearly got caught by the authorities. Bataitis first worked in the Smilgiai parish before expanding to the nearby parishes. Bataitis hid the books in gardens nests, as well as wooden poles, with trusted people and the forest. He also had established a hiding spot under the roof of the belfry of the Smilgiai church.

In 1896, priest Dominykas Tuskėnas started to collect publications for an illegal library in the Smilgiai area, and would provide funds to Bataitis to collect alongside him, especially after Tuskėnas's departure to Ukmergė. The library consisted of mainly the Lithuanian newspapers Aušra and Varpas, as well as calendars. The books were only accessible by highly trusted people. Bataitis also cooperated with other book smugglers, including Jurgis Bielinis and Kazimieras Ūdra, and would personally deliver books to author Gabrielė Petkevičaitė-Bitė, with whom he established close ties around 1901.

=== Attempted crackdowns on contraband ===
While successfully avoiding arrest, Bataitis nevertheless experienced searches. To make sure his library was not found, a system of fake names was used in regard to the ownership of specific books. He also had good relations with the Smilgiai sacristan Kazys Kasparavičius. Kasparavičius once helped Bataitis avoid arrest by taking responsibility of the books Bataitis had, under the alibi that during Pentecost people would leave paper lying under straw piles which were there because of the event - Kasperavičius would then "send" Bataitis those papers for him to edit and bind thus avoiding direct responsibility.

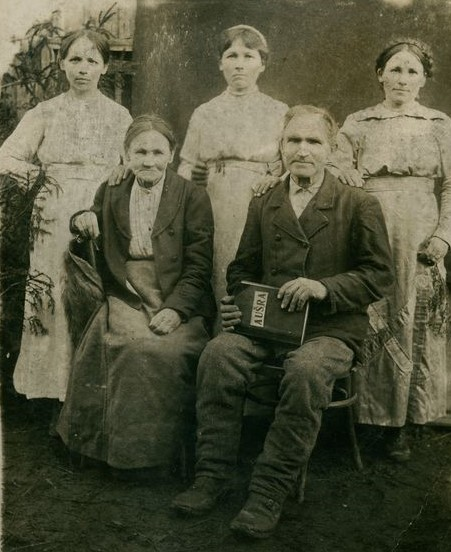
Antanas Bataitis with his wife and daughters

Other contraband searches against Bataitis were also unsuccessful as the authorities did not notice the places in which the contraband was hidden. Notably, one investigating authority would sit down and drink with Bataitis before commencing the search, and then would go to the garden to relax. Bataitis used the opportunity to hide any potential contraband, and if anything was found after all - Bataitis offered more drink for the person for him to forget it. Despite this, at one point the investigator would find Bataitis' contraband in a chest but would hide it from his investigative colleagues, and later warn Bataitis about his imprudence.

=== Last years in Lithuania ===
Bataitis struggled to maintain himself after Lithuania's independence in 1918 – only ten years later in 1928 did he receive a pension. He died on 12 March 1932 in Smilgiai, where he was subsequently buried. In 1990, a memorial roof post was built in Bataitis's honor at the cemetery.
