= Vytautas Magnus University Education Academy =

Academical unit of Vytautas Magnus University

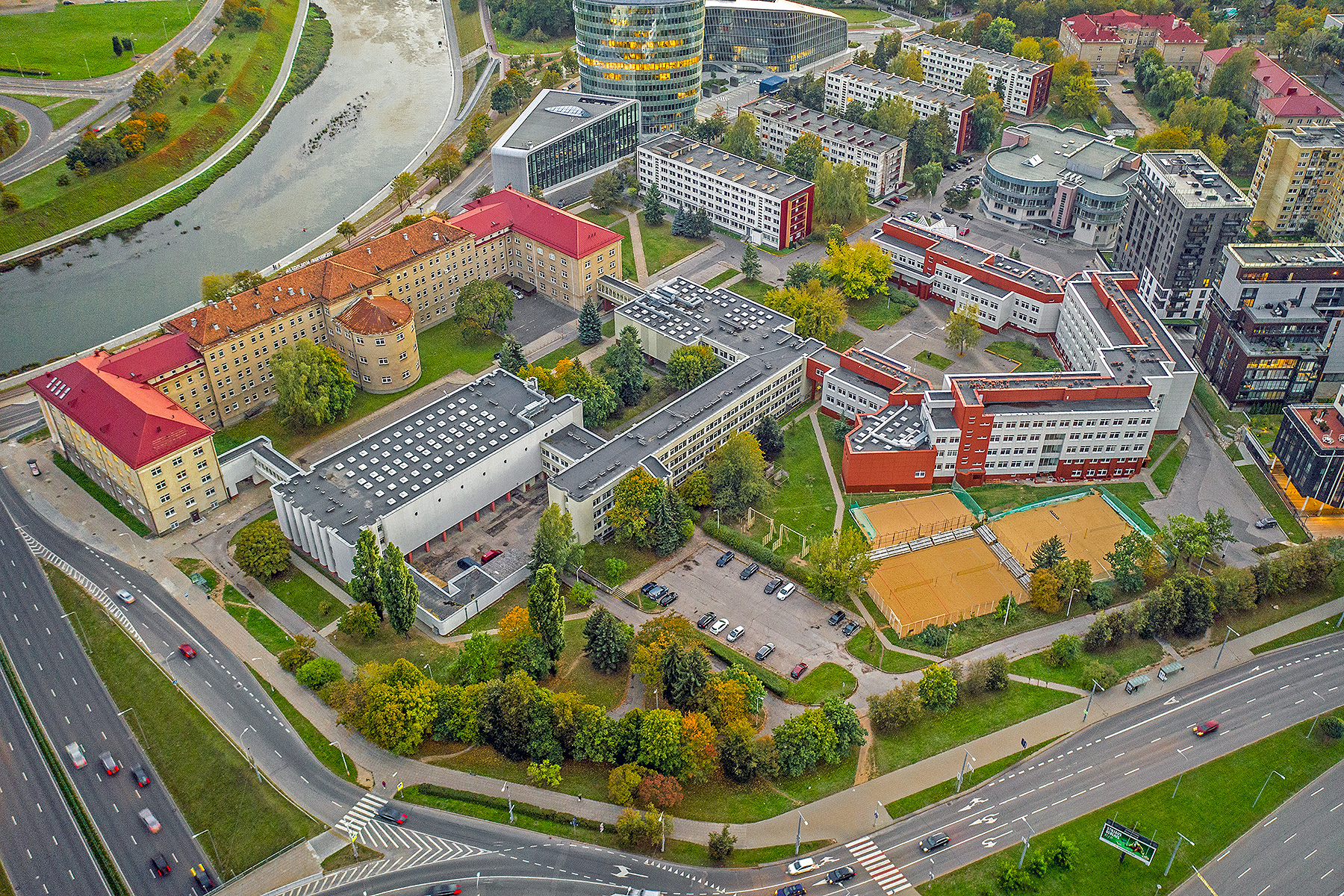
- Former names: National Pedagogical Institute, Vilnius Pedagogical Institute, Vilnius Pedagogical University
- Type: Public
- Established: 1935
- Affiliations: Vytautas Magnus University
- Chancellor: Lina Kaminskienė
- Academic staff: 552
- Students: 4448
- Location: Vilnius, Lithuania; 54°41′48″N 25°15′41″E
- Campus: Urban
- Website: https://svietimas.vdu.lt/en/

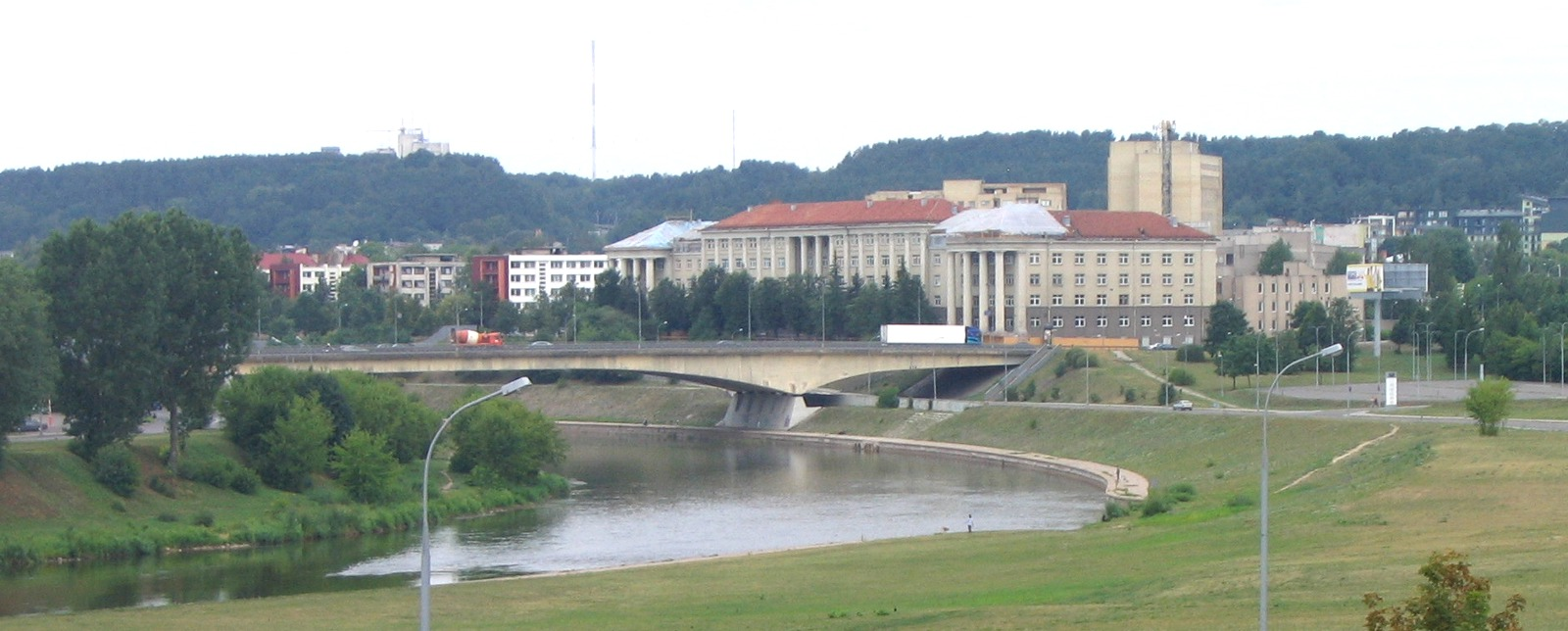

Vytautas Magnus University Education Academy (Lithuanian: Vytauto Didžiojo universiteto Švietimo akademija or VDU ŠA) is an academical unit of Vytautas Magnus University, which specialized in preparing school teachers and other educators. Located in Vilnius and Kaunas, Lithuania.

== Name changes ==
- 1935–1939 National Pedagogical Institute
- 1939–1992 Vilnius Pedagogical Institute
- 1992–2011 Vilnius Pedagogical University
- 2011–2018 Lithuanian University of Educational Sciences
- 2019–present Vytautas Magnus University Education Academy

== History ==
The first pedagogical institution in Lithuania was established in Klaipėda in 1935 by the Lithuanian government and was called the National Pedagogical Institute. After the Nazi Germany ultimatum to Lithuania in March 1939, the Nazis took control of the Klaipėda Region. The institute was moved to Panevėžys. After Lithuania regained portions of the Vilnius Region, the institution was moved to Vilnius in the autumn of 1939. It was renamed to Vilnius Pedagogical Institute (Vilniaus pedagoginis institutas).

In 1940, due to the Soviet invasion and occupation, teacher training was reformed according to Soviet standards which affected VPI as the number of students increased due to the changes. After Lithuania regained independence in 1990, the Institute was given the title of a university by the Supreme Council of the Republic Lithuania on 20 May 1992 and reformed into Vilnius Pedagogical University. In October 2011 the university was renamed to Lithuanian University of Educational Sciences.

From January 2019, the university became an integral part of the Vytautas Magnus University as the Education Academy.

== Structure ==
Faculties and institutes

- Faculty of Education
- Faculty of Philology
- Faculty of Science and Technologies
- Faculty of History
- Faculty of Lithuanian Philology
- Faculty of Social Education
- Faculty of Sports and Health Education
- Professional Competence Development Institute

Library

The library is located on the main university campus and has these departments:

- Administration
- Acquisition Department
- Branch Library for Humanities
- Library Automation Department
- Readers' Services and Reference Department
- Storage Department
- Processing Department

Other university departments

- 54 departments belonging to faculties
- Agrobiological station

== Directors and rectors ==
- 1935–1937 Vytautas Soblys
- 1937–1940 Mečislovas Mačernis
- 1940–1941 Jonas Laužikas
- 1941–1943 Albinas Liaugminas
- 1944 Jonas Alekna
- 1944–1945 Povilas Brazdžiūnas
- 1945–1946 Jonas Laužikas
- 1946–1947 Antanas Šurkus
- 1947–1948 Adolfas Jucys
- 1948–1950 Jonas Šalkauskas
- 1951–1955 Marcelinas Ročka
- 1955–1960 Juozas Mickevičius
- 1960–1979 Vytautas Uogintas
- 1979–1989 Jonas Aničas
- 1989–1993 Saulius Razma
- 1993–2003 Antanas Pakerys
- Since 2003 Algirdas Gaižutis
