= Lithuania–Russia relations =

- Lithuania: Russia

Lithuania–Russia relations or the Russo-Lithuanian relations are the bilateral relations between the Republic of Lithuania and the Russian Federation. They have been marked by a long and turbulent history dating back to the Middle Ages. The modern-day relations have been mostly hostile. The two countries share a common border through Kaliningrad Oblast. Lithuania has an embassy in Moscow with consulates in Kaliningrad and in Sovetsk, whereas Russia has an embassy in Vilnius.

Despite today's difference in population and area between the countries, Lithuania (also as part of the Polish–Lithuanian Commonwealth) and Russia (including its predecessor Principality of Moscow) were more equal regional powers in the past, competing for supremacy in Eastern Europe. The two states fought numerous wars, with Lithuania controlling sizeable parts of modern-day Russia in the Late Middle Ages, and Russia controlling the bulk of Lithuania in the late modern period. The contemporary diplomatic relations were established after the Lithuanian–Soviet War, by signing a peace treaty on 12 July 1920.

In response to the 2022 Russian invasion of Ukraine and the Bucha massacre, in April 2022, Lithuania downgraded diplomatic relations and expelled the Russian ambassador. As of 2022, the relations between the countries have been reduced to the bare minimum.

== History ==
=== Medieval period ===
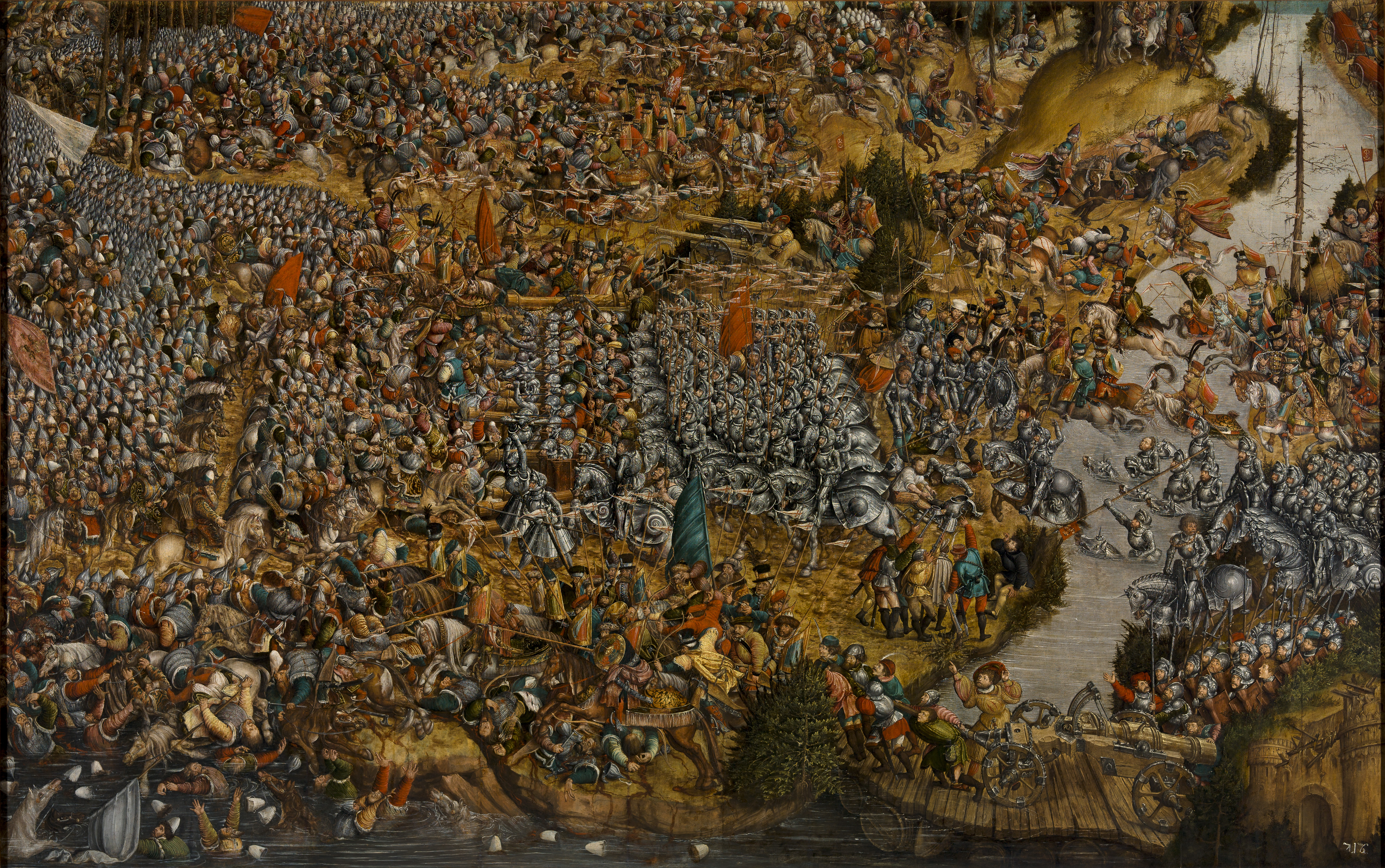
Battle of Orsha (1514)

The origins of the relations between contemporary Lithuania and Russia can be traced back to the Middle Ages, when the expanding Grand Duchy of Lithuania came into contact with the Principality of Moscow. The rivalry between the Lithuanian dukes and Muscovite princes began in the first half of the 14th century and soon resulted in Lithuanian–Muscovite War (1368–1372). In this conflict, the Principality of Tver sided with Lithuania. The conflict resumed again in the 15th century, as the rulers of both powers had aspirations to seize the territories of the former Kievan Rus', resulting in a number of campaigns, territorial changes, complex alliances and regional rulers changing sides. On 31 August 1449, Casimir IV Jagiellon and Vasily II of Moscow signed the first treaty between Lithuania and Muscovy, referred to as the Treaty of Eternal Peace (1449). The wars continued in 1487–1494, 1500–1503, and 1512–1522, with a number of truce and peace treaties signed in this period. In the early 16th century, Lithuania lost the eastern cities of Bryansk, Kursk, and Smolensk to Muscovy.

=== Post-medieval period ===
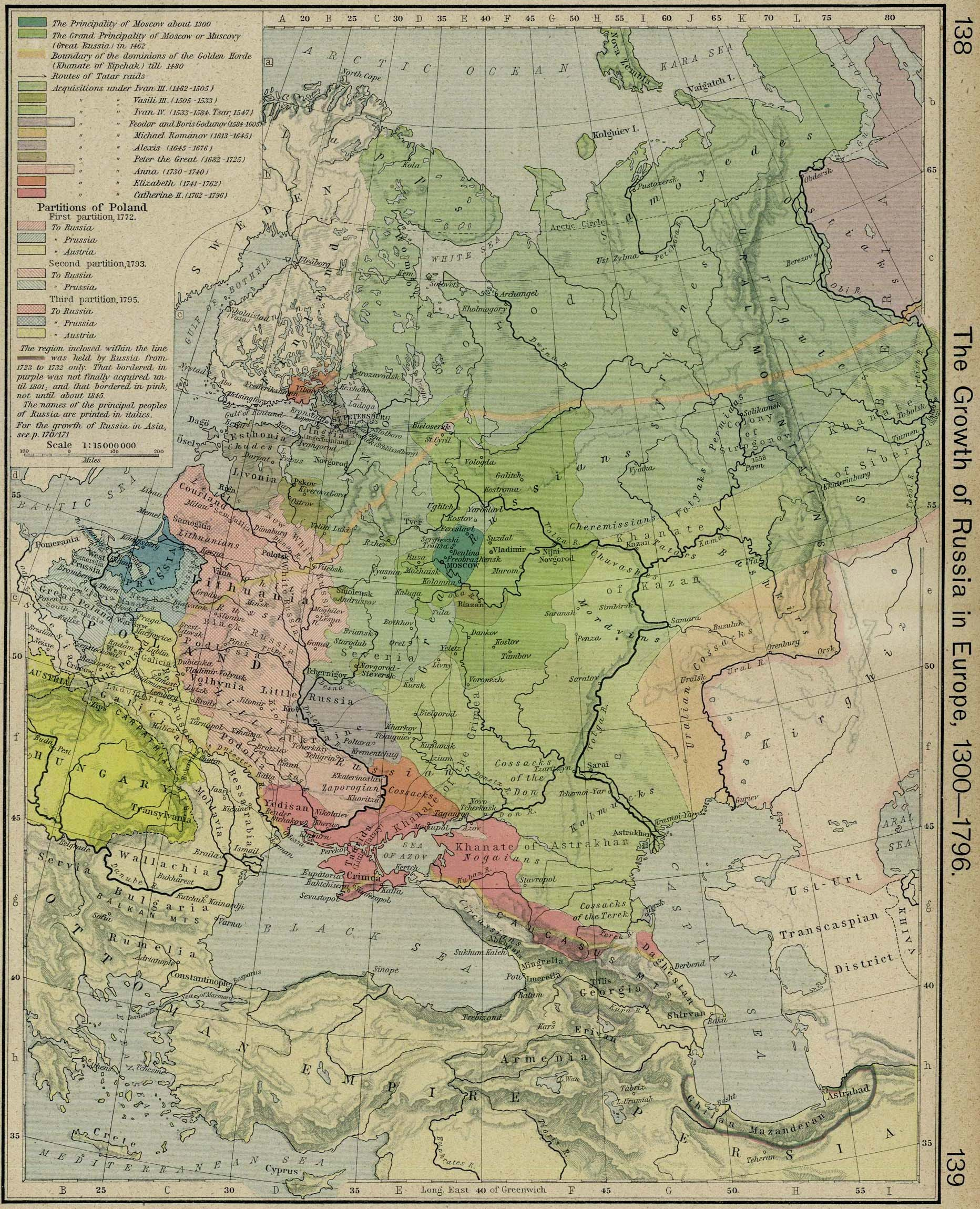
After the Partitions of the Polish-Lithuanian state in 1795, the majority of Lithuanians would fall under Russian rule for over a century.

After the Union of Lublin in 1569, the Grand Duchy of Lithuania co-formed the Polish–Lithuanian Commonwealth. Meanwhile, Ivan IV seized the territories in the north and, in 1547, consolidated them under the Tsardom of Russia. Both states continued to have wars, either directly or within alliances, throughout the 16th and 17th centuries. Following the Great Northern War, which involved many European powers, the Polish–Lithuanian Commonwealth began to decline and was eventually partitioned by the neighbouring powers. After the third partition in 1795, the bulk of the territory of the former Grand Duchy of Lithuania was taken over by the Russian Empire. The new provinces were often called "Lithuanian", but in 1840, Nicholas I prohibited the use of the name. There were two major rebellions against the Russian rule, the November Uprising of 1830 and the January Uprising of 1863, but they failed to restore the Polish–Lithuanian state.

=== 20th century ===
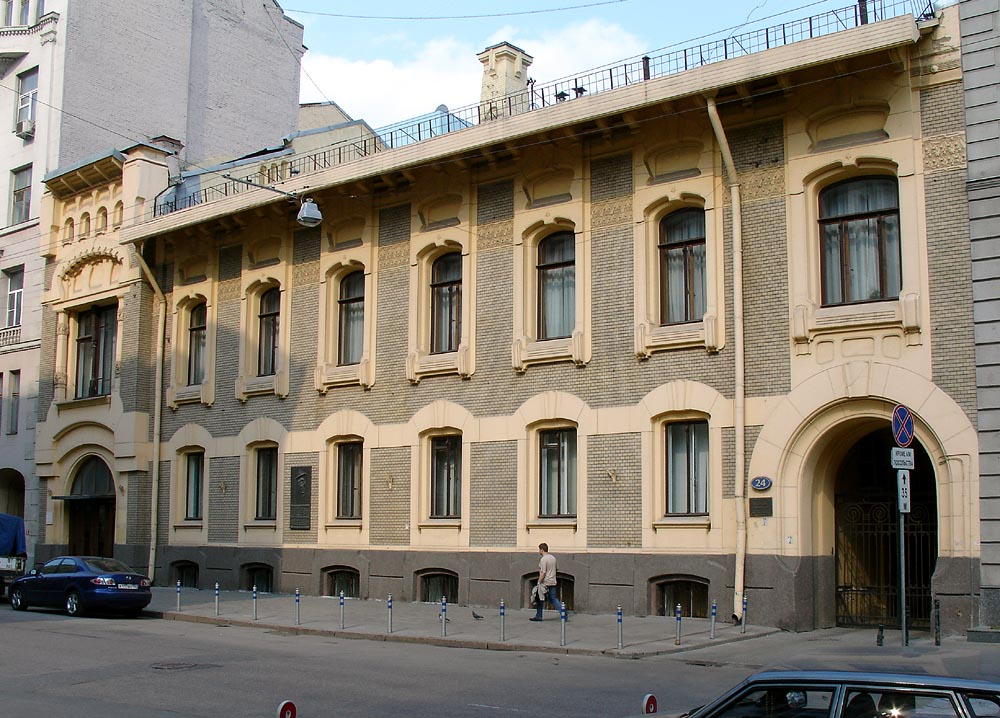
In 1920–1940, the Embassy of Lithuania was located in the former mansion of Saarbekov on Povarskaya Street.

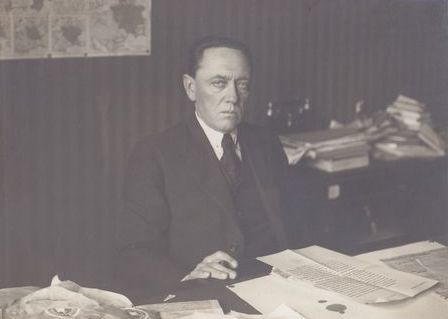
Jurgis Baltrušaitis, Ambassador of Lithuania in Moscow, 1927

During the 1905 Russian Revolution, a large congress of Lithuanian representatives in the Great Seimas of Vilnius demanded a wide political autonomy for Lithuania (by which they meant the northwestern portion of the former Grand Duchy of Lithuania) on 5 December of that year. The tsarist regime made a number of concessions as the result of the 1905 uprising. The Baltic states once again were permitted to use their native languages in schooling and public discourse, and Catholic churches were again built in Lithuania. Latin alphabet was restored after a period of the Lithuanian press ban. However, even Russian liberals were not prepared to concede autonomy similar to the degree it already existed in Estonia and Latvia, albeit under Baltic German hegemony. Many Baltic Germans looked toward aligning the Baltics (Lithuania and Courland in particular) with Germany.

After the outbreak of hostilities in World War I, Germany occupied Lithuania and Courland in 1915. Vilnius fell to the Germans on 19 September 1915 and Lithuania was incorporated into Ober Ost under a German government of occupation. As open annexation could result in a public-relations backlash, the Germans planned to form a network of formally independent states that would in fact be dependent on Germany. However, the defeat of Germany in World War I and the October Revolution in Russia created an opportunity for the Lithuanian leaders to organize the Vilnius Conference and begin the process of reestablishing a fully independent Lithuanian state. On 16 February 1918, the Council of Lithuania signed the Act of Independence of Lithuania, proclaiming the Republic of Lithuania.

==== Interwar period ====
During the Soviet westward offensive of 1918–19, which followed the retreating German troops, a Lithuanian–Soviet War was fought between the newly independent Lithuania and the Soviet Russia. At the same time, the Soviet Russia created short-lived puppet states: Lithuanian Soviet Socialist Republic which was soon merged into the Lithuanian–Byelorussian Soviet Socialist Republic. However, the Soviet military campaign was unsuccessful and the Soviet–Lithuanian Peace Treaty was signed on 12 July 1920. In the treaty, the Soviet Russia recognized fully independent Lithuania, including its claims to the disputed Vilnius Region.

Following the peace treaty with Soviet Russia, Lithuania secretly allowed the Soviet forces a passage through its territory as they moved against Poland. On 14 July 1920, the advancing Soviet army captured Vilnius and returned it to Lithuanians, but on 26 August 1920 the city was again captured by the Polish army which defeated the Soviets. To prevent further fighting, the Suwałki Agreement was signed by Poland and Lithuania on 7 October 1920; it left Vilnius on the Lithuanian side of the armistice line. It never went into effect, however, because Polish General Lucjan Żeligowski, acting on Józef Piłsudski's orders, staged the Żeligowski's Mutiny: a military offensive presented as a mutiny. He invaded Lithuania on 8 October 1920, captured Vilnius the following day, and established a short-lived Republic of Central Lithuania in eastern Lithuania on 12 October 1920. The "Republic" was a part of Piłsudski's federalist scheme, which never materialized due to opposition from both the Polish and Lithuanian nationalists.

On 30 December 1922, Soviet Russia was incorporated into the Soviet Union, and the latter state inherited the Lithuania–Russia relations.

The Third Seimas of Lithuania was elected in May 1926. For the first time, the bloc led by the Lithuanian Christian Democratic Party lost their majority and went into opposition. It was sharply criticized for signing the Soviet–Lithuanian Non-Aggression Pact, even though it affirmed Soviet recognition of Lithuanian claims to Poland-held Vilnius.

==== World War II ====
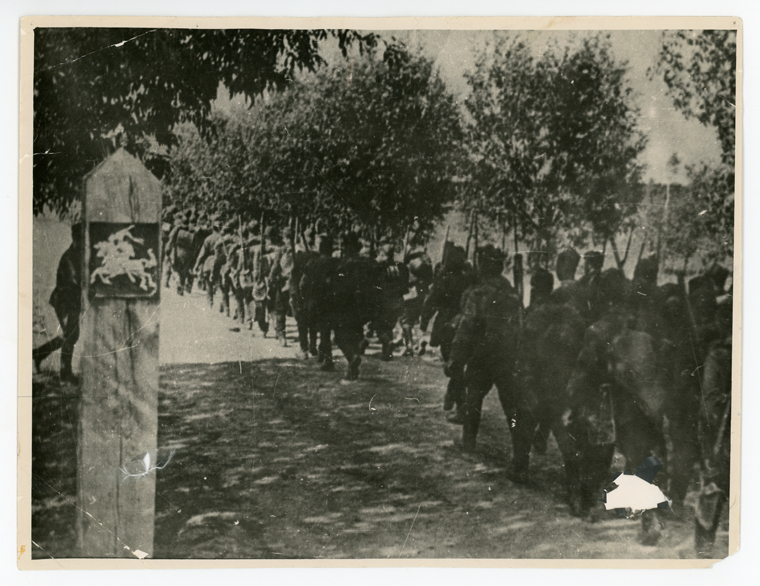
Soldiers of the Red Army enter the territory of Lithuania during the first Soviet occupation of Lithuania in 1940

At the beginning of World War II, when the Soviet Union invaded Poland, Soviet troops took over the Vilnius Region. The region belonged to Interwar Poland, but according to the 1920 Soviet–Lithuanian Peace Treaty and later treaties, it was recognized as Lithuanian. As a result, Soviets and Germans re-negotiated the secret protocols of the Molotov–Ribbentrop Pact. On 28 September 1939, they signed the Boundary and Friendship Treaty. Its secret attachment detailed that to compensate the Soviet Union for German-occupied Polish territories, Germany would transfer Lithuania, except for a small territory in Suvalkija, to the Soviet sphere of influence. The exchange of territories was also motivated by Soviet control of Vilnius: the Soviet Union could exert significant influence on the Lithuanian government, which claimed Vilnius to be its de jure capital. In the secret protocols, both Soviet Union and Germany explicitly recognized Lithuanian interest in Vilnius. Accordingly, by the Soviet–Lithuanian Mutual Assistance Treaty of 10 October 1939, Lithuania would acquire about one fifth of the Vilnius Region, including Lithuania's historical capital, Vilnius, and in exchange would allow five Soviet military bases with 20,000 troops to be established across Lithuania.

After months of intense propaganda and diplomatic pressure, the Soviets issued an ultimatum on 14 June 1940. Soviets accused Lithuania of violating the treaty and abducting Russian soldiers from their bases. Soviets demanded that a new government, which would comply with the Mutual Assistance Treaty, would be formed and that an unspecified number of Soviet troops would be admitted to Lithuania. With Soviet troops already in the country, it was impossible to mount military resistance. Soviets took control of government institutions, installed a new pro-Soviet puppet government, and announced elections to the People's Seimas. Following the sham election, the Lithuanian Soviet Socialist Republic was incorporated into the Soviet Union on 3 August 1940. One local Communist party emerged from underground with 1500 members in Lithuania.

==== Soviet occupation (1944-1991) ====
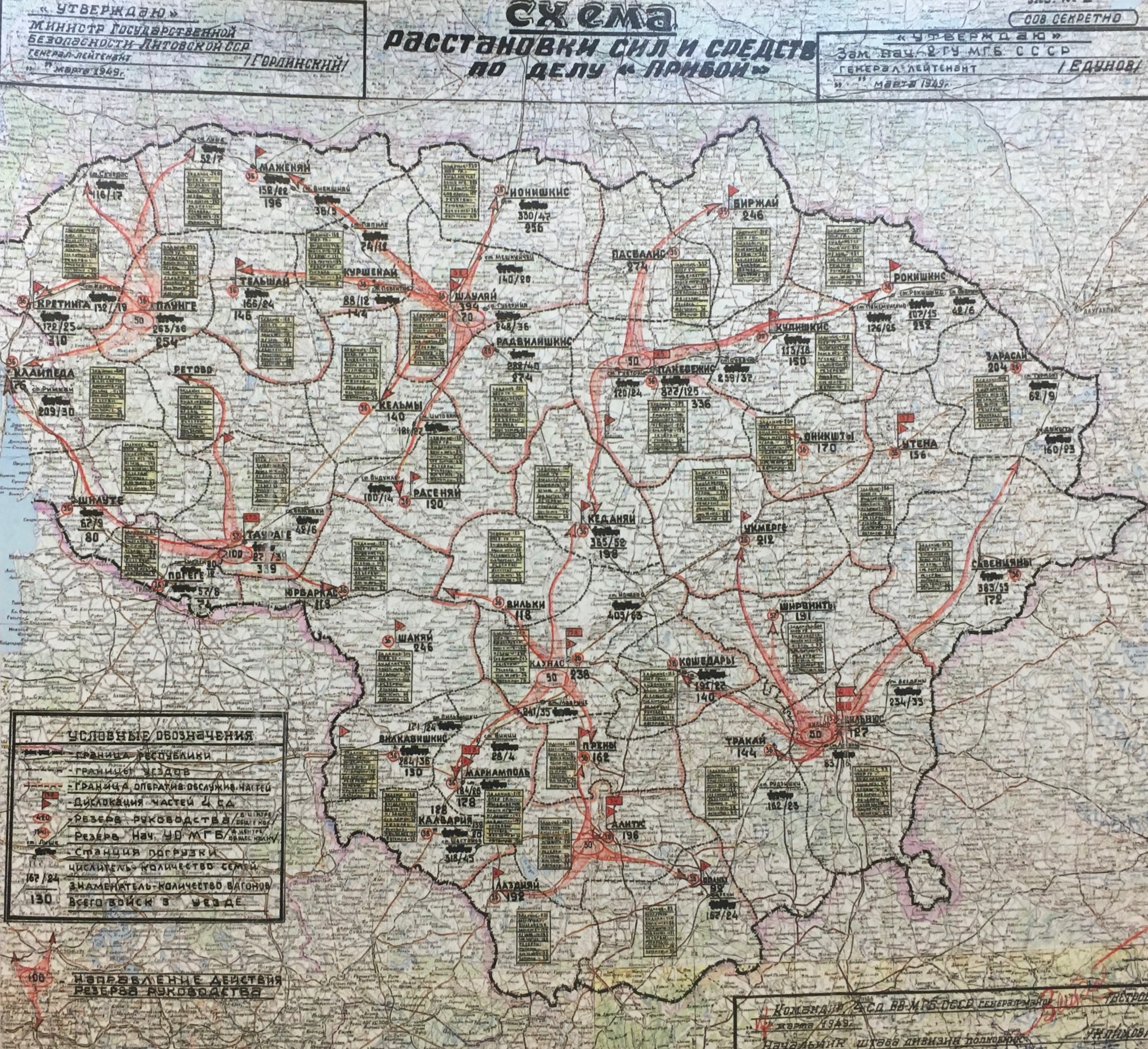
The plan of deportations of the civilian population created by the Soviet MGB.

In the summer of 1944, the Soviet Red Army reached eastern Lithuania. By July 1944, the area around Vilnius came under control of the Polish Resistance fighters of the Armia Krajowa, who also attempted a takeover of the German-held city during the ill-fated Operation Ostra Brama. The Red Army captured Vilnius with Polish help on 13 July. The Soviet Union re-occupied Lithuania and Joseph Stalin re-established the Lithuanian Soviet Socialist Republic in 1944, with its capital in Vilnius. The Soviets secured the passive agreement of the United States and Great Britain (see Yalta Conference and Potsdam Agreement) to this annexation. By January 1945, the Soviet forces captured Klaipėda on the Baltic coast. The heaviest physical losses in Lithuania during World War II were suffered in 1944–45, when the Red Army pushed out the Nazi invaders. It is estimated that Lithuania lost 780,000 people between 1940 and 1954 under the Nazi and Soviet occupations.

After Stalin's death in 1953, the deportees were slowly and gradually released. The last deportees were released only in 1963. Some 60,000 managed to return to Lithuania, while 30,000 were prohibited from settling back in their homeland. Soviet authorities encouraged the immigration of non-Lithuanian workers, especially Russians, as a way of integrating Lithuania into the Soviet Union and encouraging industrial development, but in Lithuania, this process did not assume the massive scale experienced by other European Soviet republics.

As allies of the Soviet Union during World War II, the United States and the United Kingdom recognized the occupation of the Republic of Lithuania at Yalta Conference in 1945 de facto. However, the US, UK, and Western governments did not recognize the seizure of Lithuania by the Soviet Union in 1940 and in 1944 de jure according to the Welles Declaration of 23 July 1940. As a result of this doctrine, most Western countries continue to recognize Lithuania as an independent, sovereign de jure state subject to international law represented by the legations appointed by the pre-1940 state which functioned through the Lithuanian Diplomatic Service.

Soviet repressions

During the occupation of Lithuania, at least 130,000 people, 70% of them women and children, were forcibly transported to labor camps and other forced settlements in remote parts of the Soviet Union, such as the Irkutsk Oblast and Krasnoyarsk Krai. Among the deportees were about 4,500 Poles. These deportations did not include Lithuanian partisans or political prisoners (approximately 150,000 people) deported to Gulag forced labor camps. Deportations of the civilians served a double purpose: repressing resistance to Sovietization policies in Lithuania and providing free labor in sparsely inhabited areas of the Soviet Union. Approximately 28,000 of Lithuanian deportees died in exile due to poor living conditions.

In 1956 and 1957, the Supreme Soviet of the Soviet Union approved releases of larger groups of the deportees, including the Lithuanians. Deportees started returning in large numbers creating difficulties for local communists – deportees would petition for return of their confiscated property, were generally considered unreliable, and required special surveillance. Soviet Lithuanian officials, including Antanas Sniečkus, drafted local administrative measures prohibiting deportee return and petitioned Moscow to enact national policies to that effect. In May 1958, the Soviet Union revised its policy regarding the remaining deportees: all those who were not involved with the Lithuanian partisans were released, but without the right to return to Lithuania. The last Lithuanians—the partisan relatives and the partisans—were released only in 1960 and 1963 respectively. A majority of the deportees were released in May 1958 and later never returned to Lithuania.

About 60,000 deportees returned to Lithuania. Upon return, they faced further difficulties; their property was long looted and divided up by strangers, they faced discrimination for jobs and social guarantees, and their children were denied higher education. Former deportees, resistance members, and their children were not allowed to integrate into the society. That created a permanent group of people that opposed the regime and continued non-violent resistance.

==== Lithuanian restoration of independence ====
Lithuania declared sovereignty on its territory on 18 May 1989 and restored independence from the Soviet Union on 11 March 1990 as the Republic of Lithuania. It was the first Soviet republic to do so. All legal ties of the Soviet Union's sovereignty over the republic were cut as Lithuania declared the restitution of its independence. The Soviet Union claimed that this declaration was illegal, suggesting that Lithuania had to follow the process of secession mandated in the Soviet Constitution. Lithuania claimed that the Soviet annexation itself was illegal and claimed state continuity. In January 1991, during the January Events, the Soviet military attempted to crack down on Lithuanian independence, killing 14 civilians and injuring over 140. Following the failed 1991 Soviet coup d'état attempt, most countries recognized Lithuanian independence, and the Soviet Union itself followed on 6 September 1991.

=== Lithuania and the Russian Federation ===
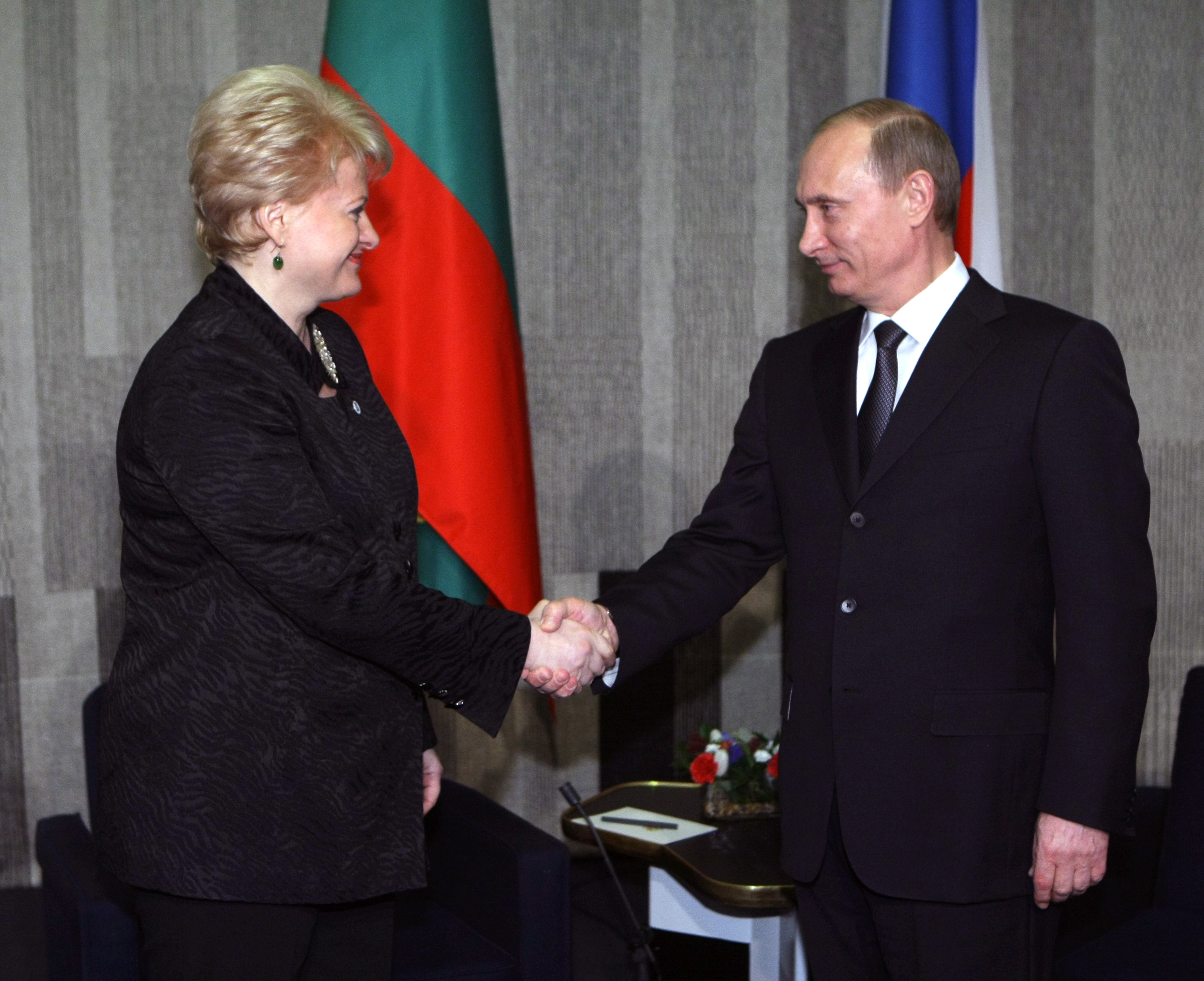
President of Lithuania Dalia Grybauskaitė with Prime Minister of Russia Vladimir Putin in Helsinki, Finland on 10 February 2010.

On 27 July 1991, the Russian government re-recognized Lithuania and the two countries re-established diplomatic relations on 9 October 1991. President Boris Yeltsin and the Chairman of the Supreme Council Vytautas Landsbergis met to discuss economic ties. The Russian troops stayed in Lithuania for an additional three years, as Boris Yeltsin linked the issue of Russian minorities with troop withdrawals. Lithuania was the first to have the Russian troops withdrawn from its territory in August 1993. Since the reestablishment of independence, only two Lithuanian leaders have visited Moscow: once by Algirdas Brazauskas in 1997 and twice by Valdas Adamkus, in 2001 and 2005. A planned 1999 trip to Moscow was reportedly canceled due to Boris Yeltsin's illness. The first telephone conversation took place between Dalia Grybauskaitė and Dmitry Medvedev in 2009.

Following Russia's military intervention in Ukraine, concerns about the geopolitical environment led Lithuania to begin preparing for a possibility of a military conflict with Russia. In December 2014, Russia carried out a military drill in nearby Kaliningrad with 55 naval vessels and 9,000 soldiers. In 2015, Lithuanian Chief of Defence Jonas Vytautas Žukas announced plans to reinstate conscription, which had previously ended in 2008, to bolster the ranks of the Lithuanian Armed Forces. The plan succeeded, while the vast majority are voluntary, with only about 10% by today (as of late 2010s) being drawn from compulsory conscription involuntarily. The Ministry of National Defence also published a 98-page manual for citizens to prepare them for a possibility of armed conflict or occupation. In 2017, NATO Enhanced Forward Presence was deployed to Lithuania and other NATO members in the eastern flank.

==== Russian invasion of Ukraine ====
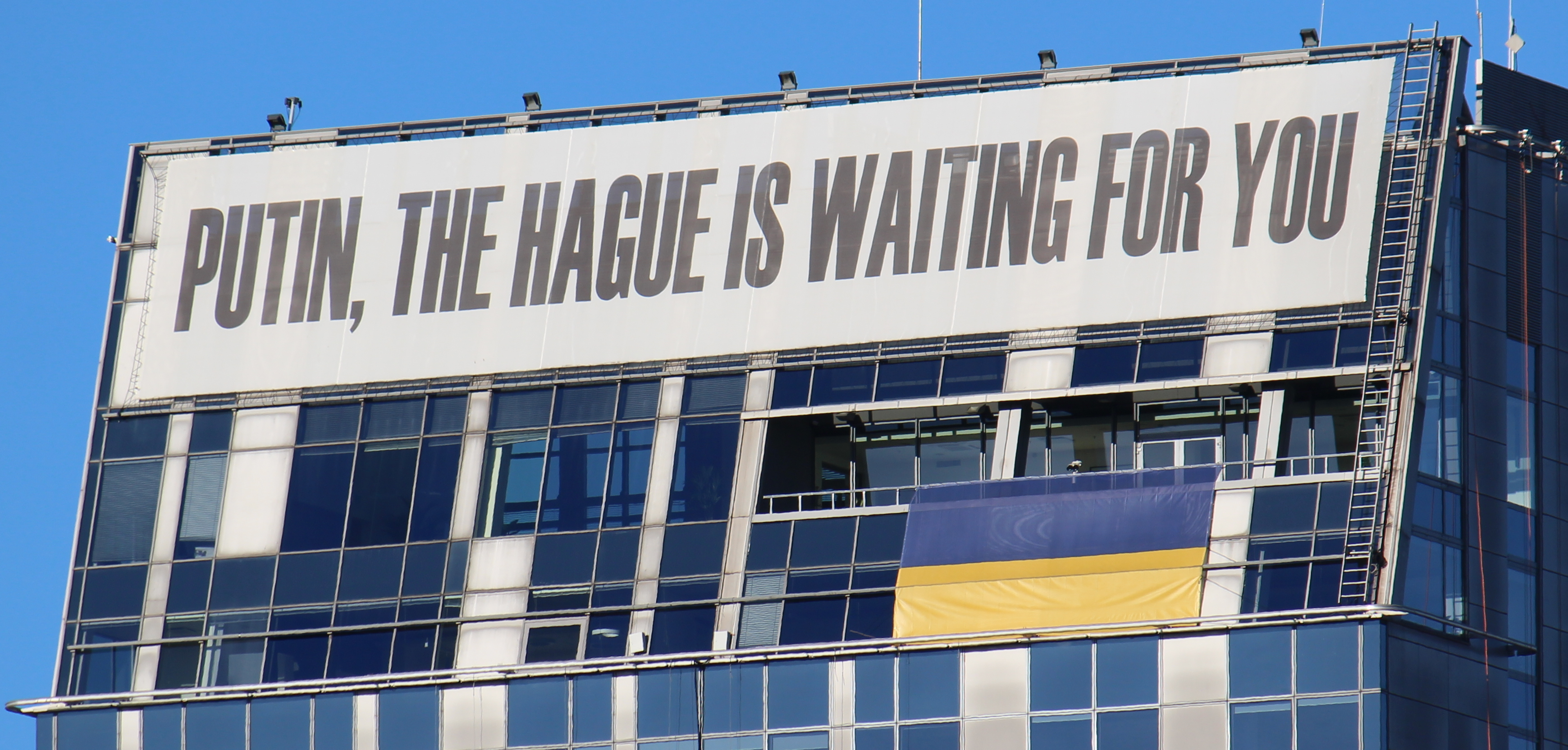
Message on the Vilnius City Municipality building

Following the start of the 2022 Russian invasion of Ukraine, Lithuania has strongly condemned the invasion and called for military, economic and humanitarian aid for Ukraine. President of Lithuania Gitanas Nausėda declared a state of emergency on 24 February 2022. On the same day, Lithuania also requested NATO to activate the Article 4 on joint consultations.

Together with the other EU member states, Lithuania banned Russian language media channels and imposed sanctions on Russia, and Russia, in turn, added all EU countries to the list of "unfriendly nations". Soon after Lithuania expelled four Russian diplomats. On 4 April, in response to the Bucha massacre, Lithuania expelled the Russian ambassador and closed the consulate in Klaipėda. In April 2022, the Russian government decided to withdraw its consent to the functioning of the Consulate-General of Lithuania in Saint Petersburg. According to a poll conducted in February 2022, just before the invasion of Ukraine, 83% of Lithuanians had a negative opinion of Russia. This number increased to 90% later that year.

On 10 May, Lithuania's Seimas voted unanimously to describe Russia's actions in Ukraine as constituting terrorism and genocide. The motion described Russia's war crimes in Ukraine as including "deliberate killing of civilians, mass rape, forcible relocation of Ukrainian citizens to Russia and the destruction of economic infrastructure and cultural sites". The motion claimed that Russian forces were targeting Ukrainian civilian sites for bombing and described Russia as a state which "supports and perpetrates terrorism". In response to the resolution, Leonid Slutsky stated that the resolution was part of an "anti-Russia project", accused Lithuania of Russophobia and said that "the level of relations with Lithuania has already been lowered significantly".

On 8 June 2022, Russian parliamentarian Yevgeny Alexeyevich Fyodorov submitted a bill to the Duma to repeal the recognition by the Russian state of Lithuania's independence. He thought that in this way the other two Baltic states might have their independence reversed too. An academic from the Institute of Commonwealth of Independent States brought up several expansionist devices and suggested that the Baltic States were "making the same mistake as Ukraine, which believed that the Russian Federation would never send troops because the United States was behind it." Towards the end of June, Lithuania announced that it would be blocking the transport of Russian goods through their territory from mainland Russia to Kaliningrad. Russia criticised Lithuania for this.

In September 2022, Poland, Lithuania, Latvia, and Estonia have decided to close entry for the Russian citizens with Schengen visas, including those issued by third countries. In 2022, around 4,000 Russian citizens applied for a residence permit in Lithuania, while 38 had their permanent residence permit revoked over security concerns.

In December 2022, diplomatic relations between Lithuania and Russia were downgraded to the level of acting chargé d'affaires after the Russian ambassador was expelled and the Lithuanian ambassador recalled.

In August 2023, following a survey, Lithuania announced that 254 Russian and 910 Belarusian citizens living in Lithuania posed a threat to national security and that their residence permits will be revoked.

In September 2023, following the new explanation of the EU sanctions by the European Commission, Lithuania together with the other Baltic States and Finland banned the vehicles with the Russian license plates from entering their territory.

In October 2024, Lithuania denounced several treaties with Russia and Belarus, including a treaty on double taxation of income and a treaty on legal assistance.

In 2024, a survey suggested that 70% of Lithuanians think that Russia poses a real threat.

== Trade ==
In 2021, Russia exported $4.56 billion of goods to Lithuania, with crude oil being the main product. Exports from Lithuania were $4.14 billion with wine being the top product. From 1995 to 2021, Russian exports have risen by 6.04% p.a., with Lithuanian exports rising at 8.06% on average.

== Ambassadors ==
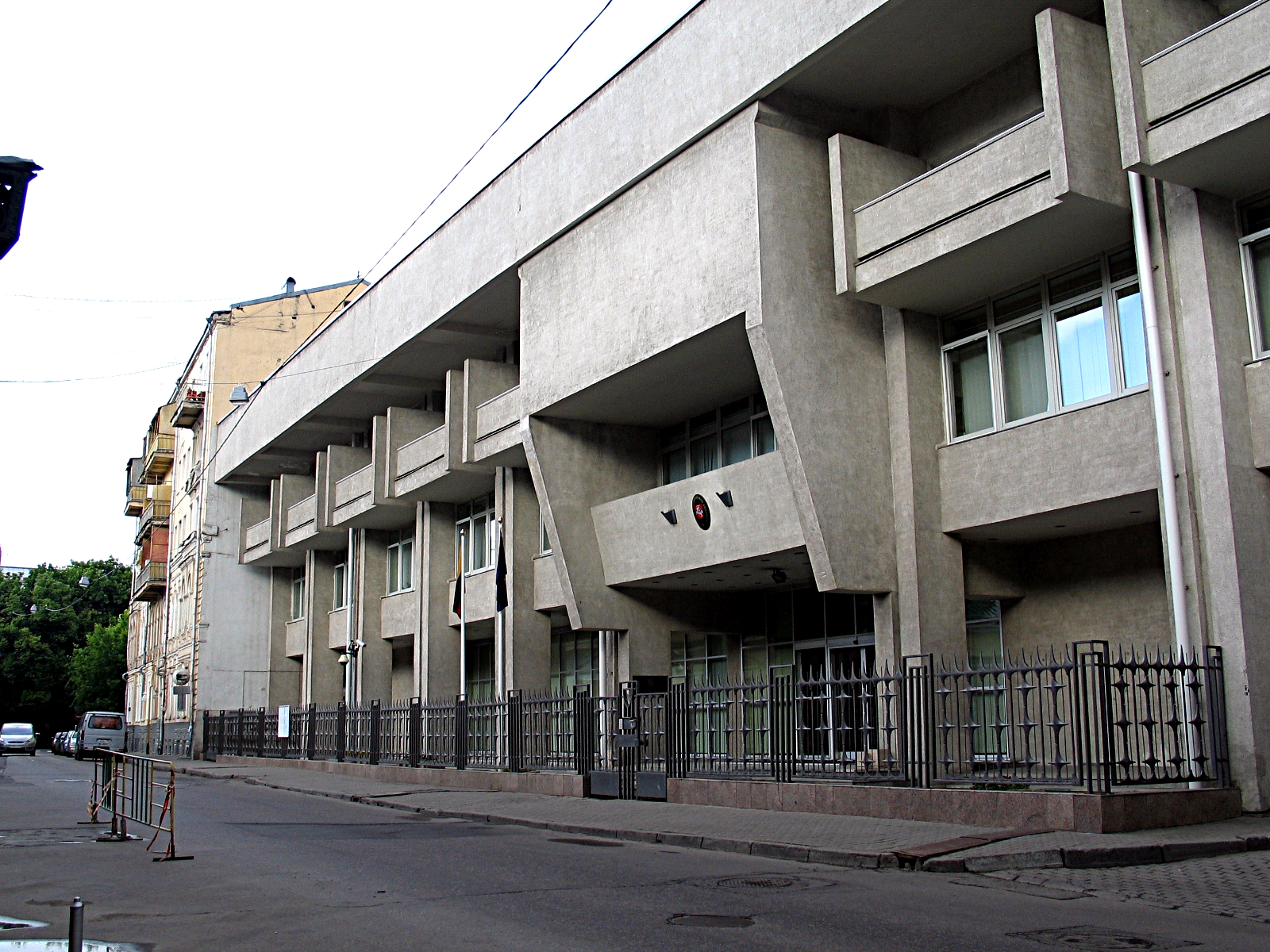
Lithuanian embassy in Moscow.

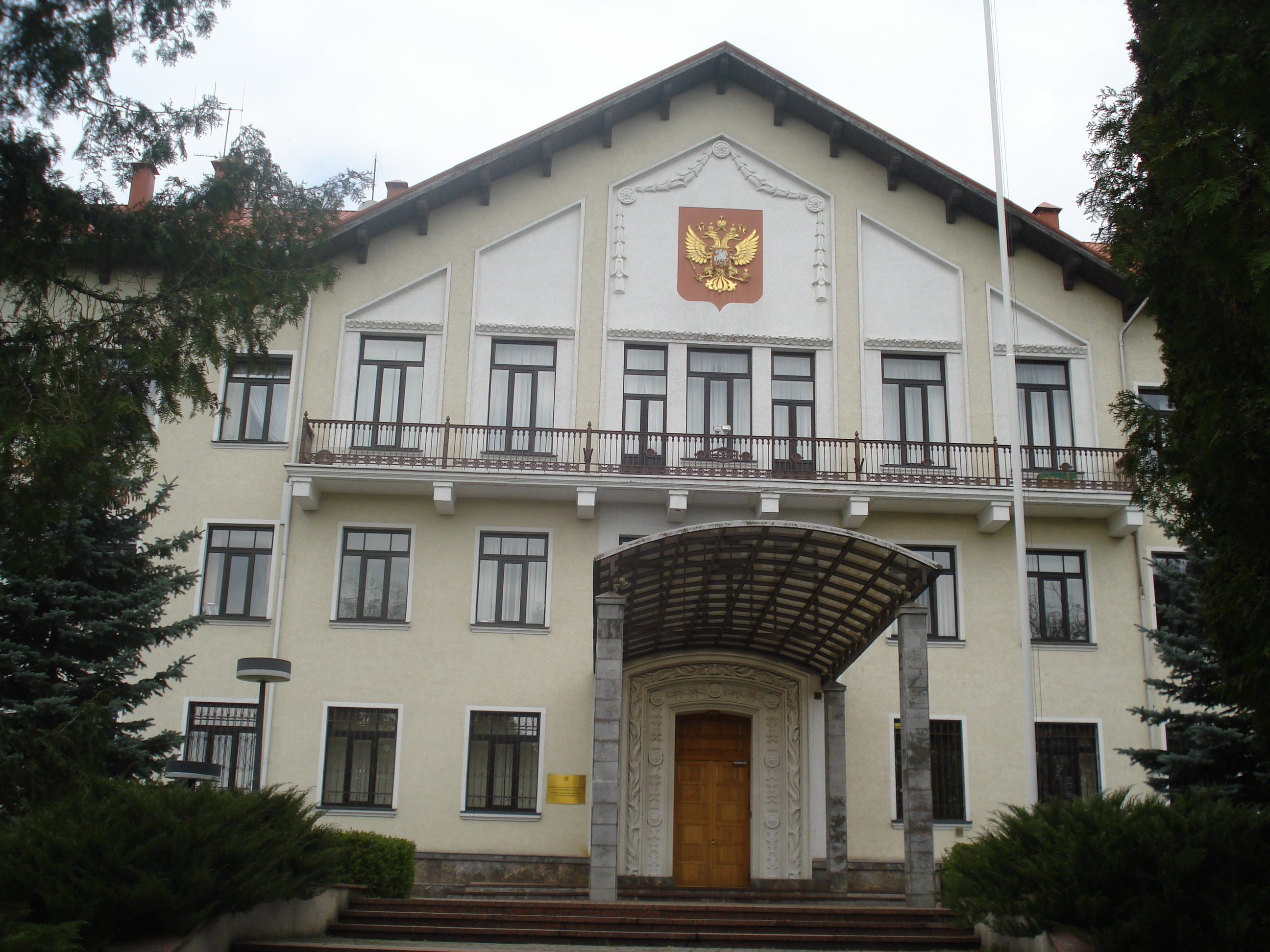
Russian embassy in Vilnius.

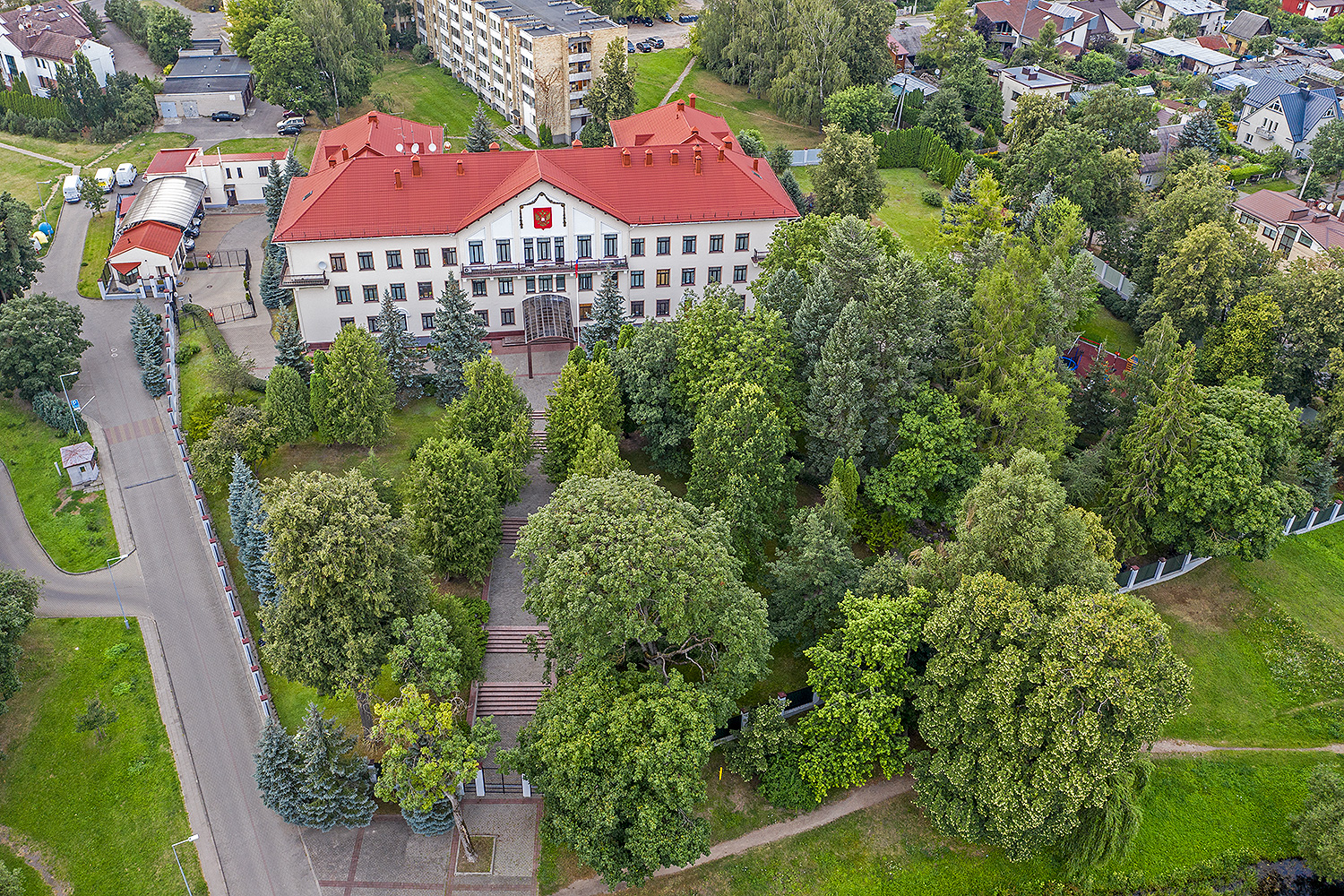
Aerial view of the Russian embassy in Vilnius

=== Lithuanian ===
- Egidijus Bičkauskas (1993–1998, plenipotentiary representative)
- Romualdas Kozyrovičius (1999–2000, 2006–2007)
- Zenonas Namavičius (2000–2002)
- Rimantas Šidlauskas (2002–2008)
- Antanas Vinkus (2009–2011)
- Renatas Norkus (2012–2014)
- Remigijus Motuzas (2015–2020)
- Eitvydas Bajarūnas (2020–2022; recalled due to Russo-Ukrainian War)

=== Russian ===
See List of ambassadors of Russia to Lithuania (List of ambassadors of the USSR and Russia in Lithuania)

- Nikolai Obertydhev (Russian: Обёртышев, Николай Михайлович) (1992–1996)
- Konstantin Mozel (Russian: Мозель, Константин Николаевич) (1996–1999)
- Yuri Zubakov (Russian: Зубаков, Юрий Антонович) (1999–2003)
- Boris Cepov (Russian: Цепов, Борис Анатольевич) (2003–2008)
- Vladimir Chkhikvadze (Russian: Чхиквадзе, Владимир Викторович) (2008–2013)
- Aleksandr Udaltsov (Russian: Удальцов, Александр Иванович) (2013–2022)

== See also ==
- Foreign relations of Lithuania
- Foreign relations of Russia
- Lithuania–Russia border
- Lithuania–Belarus relations
- Lithuania–Ukraine relations
- Latvia–Russia relations

== Bibliography ==
- Eidintas, Alfonsas; Bumblauskas, Alfredas; Kulakauskas, Antanas; Tamošaitis, Mindaugas (2015). The History of Lithuania (PDF) (2nd ed.). Eugrimas. p. 292. ISBN 9786094371639. Archived from the original (PDF) on 28 January 2021.
- Krom, Mikhail (2012). Changing allegiances in the age of state building: the border between the Grand Duchy of Lithuania and the Grand Principality of Moscow. LIT Verlag Münster. ISBN 9783643902573.
