= Antanas Rimvydas Čaplinskas =

Lithuanian historian (1939–2011)

- Born: 28 March 1939; Kalvarija, Lithuania
- Died: 13 December 2011 (aged 72); Vilnius, Lithuania
- Occupations: Historian, energy engineer
- Known for: Books about history of Vilnius
- Awards: Statuette of Saint Christopher (2008)

Antanas Rimvydas Čaplinskas (28 March 1939 – 13 December 2011) was a Lithuanian energy engineer, historian and author of books about history of Vilnius. He was a Member of the First Council of the Vilnius city Sąjūdis, later from 1990 to 1995 he worked in the Vilnius City Council. In 2008, Čaplinskas was awarded the Statuette of Saint Christopher for his scientific works about Vilnius.

== Works ==
- Vilniaus gatvės. Istorija, vardynas, žemėlapiai (English: Streets of Vilnius. History, glossary, maps), Vilnius, 2000.
- Šv. Jono, Dominikonų, Trakų gatvės (English: St. John, Dominican, Trakai Streets), Vilnius, 1998, 2008.
- Trilogy Vilniaus gatvių istorija (English: History of Vilnius streets):
  - Valdovų kelias. Rūdninkų gatvė (English: The path of rulers. Rūdninkai Street), Vilnius, 2001.
  - Valdovų kelias. Didžioji gatvė (English: The path of rulers. Didžioji Street), Vilnius, 2002.
  - Valdovų kelias. Pilies gatvė (English: The path of rulers. Pilies Street), Vilnius, 2005.
- Vilniaus istorija: legendos ir tikrovė (English: The History of Vilnius: Legends and Reality), Vilnius, 2010.
- Vilniaus atminimo knyga: mieste įamžintos asmenybės (English: Remembrance Book of Vilnius: Personalities Perpetuated in the City), Vilnius, 2011.
