= Antanas Karoblis =

Lithuanian politician

Antanas Karoblis (17 August 1940 – 19 June 2007) was a Lithuanian politician. In 1990 he was among those who signed the Act of the Re-Establishment of the State of Lithuania.
