= Antanas Kraujelis =

- Born: 25 October 1928; Kaniūkai, Molėtai District, Lithuania
- Died: 17 March 1965 (aged 36); Papiškiai, Utena District, Lithuanian SSR
- Cause of death: Suicide by gunshot
- Other names: Siaubūnas, Pabaisa
- Occupation: Anti-Soviet partisan
- Years active: 1948–1965
- Known for: Last active Lithuanian anti-Soviet partisan

Antanas Kraujelis, also known by his codename Siaubūnas (25 October 1928 – 17 March 1965) was the last active anti-Soviet Lithuanian partisan and the last partisan of the region of Aukštaitija.

== Biography ==
=== Early life ===
Antanas Kraujelis was born in the village of Kaniūkai in the Utena District of Lithuania to Steponas Kraujelis and Anelė Pagalytė. The family consisted of seven sisters and three brothers. Kraujelis went to the Kaniūkai primary school, and in 1945 he graduated in the Alanta gymnasium. During the Soviet re-occupation of Lithuania, Kraujelis was the head of a reading club in Kaniūkai, which was established under the directive of the Soviet government. There he frequently met both Soviet destruction battalions and partisans themselves, who gave Kraujelis missions like delivering ammunition and weapons. By 1947 or 1949 the village was home to bunkers established by the partisans. For some time they were headquarters to Jonas Kimštas-Žalgiris, partisan leader of the Vytautas military district. The family worked closely to protect and provide for the partisans that stayed there, although later due to increasing repression against the partisans and the family itself, the partisans had to leave the Kraujelis village. Antanas, along with his sisters Ona and Vitalija gradually became communicators of the partisan Vytautas military district. Communicators were a respected role amongst the resistance (another notable "communicator" being poet-partisan Bronius Krivickas).

=== As a partisan ===
The partisans often tried to persuade Kraujelis to work as a spy for the movement. Kraujelis himself said he'd be more useful to the movement if he was "free". Kraujelis and his role was revealed by some captured partisans and in 1948 he ended up joining a partisan squad in the Vytautas military district, as well as choosing the codename Pabaisa (monster), later turning into Siaubūnas. In 1949-1950 he met with the partisan leadership of the Dzūkija region as a representative of the east Aukštaitija partisans. In 1950 Kraujelis switched to another partisan squad, headquartered in Žėručiai. The squad mainly operated in the Molėtai, Anykščiai and Utena districts. Kraujelis later was appointed as the head of Žėručiai's intelligence/reconnaissance department. In 1951 he switched squads again, this time being appointed as the chief of staff of the Žėručiai district. In the same year the head of the district Henrikas Ruškulis-Liūtas was arrested. Kraujelis was often welcomed by the village people he visited, who described him as soft-spoken and brave. Kraujelis was also described as someone of keen ingenuity and fast orientation. He often spoke of Lithuanian future independence.

=== Years as last partisan ===
By 1952 or 1954 he was betrayed and shot in the lung by his long-time friend Edmundas Satkūnas, whom Kraujelis sorrowfully admitted to killing later. Kraujelis was almost killed by undercover Soviet agent Bronius Kalytis-Siaubas. Large sums of money and other rewards were promised for those who could catch or kill Antanas Kraujelis. By 1954, Kraujelis was one of the last partisans, though he still continued his resistance albeit under different means. He'd write threatening letters to Soviet authorities and activists, demanding to not hurt the local populace. To avoid being caught, Kraujelis sometimes even dressed up in women's clothing and long hair, other times as a Soviet artillery officer. Kraujelis's reputation began gaining popularity and he was commonly referred to in newspapers as a bandit (as were the partisans themselves). In 1955 Kraujelis met his future wife Janina Snukiškyte, with whom he was wed by a priest in the forest. In 1956 they had a son, also named Antanas, who was given the surname Petronis (in reference to the village Kraujelis was staying at to protect the son's identity). Kraujelis' family, to whom he'd write only rarely, had been subject to multiple deportations to Siberia since 1951, from which they would only fully return and be left alone in 1966.

=== Capture and death ===
From 1960 Kraujelis hid in the house of his brother-in-law, in which he built a hideout under the home's furnace. The house, which was suspected in housing Kraujelis, was being gradually surrounded by KGB agents and militia. On the morning of March 17, 1965, a shootout broke out between Kraujelis, whose bunker was finally discovered, and the agents. During the proceeding shootout, Kraujelis was wounded. The KGB offered Kraujelis to surrender. He considered escaping in women's clothing, but nonetheless, not wanting to be taken into captivity, Kraujelis burned some important documents and shot himself thereafter.

== Posthumous remembrence ==
=== Burial and discovery ===
After his death, Kraujelis's body was transferred for postmortem recognition by KGB general major Marijonas Misiukonis and subsequently hidden. His body was uncovered in 2019 in a cemetery in Vilnius. After the body was confirmed by DNA evidence, Kraujelis was given a subsequent state funeral in Antakalnis.

=== Controversy and 2009 court case ===
From 1964 Kraujelis was often accused of robberies and murders of innocent people in KGB criminal cases (it was standard for partisans to be called bandits and accused of violence). These accusations are considered by Lithuanian historians to be fraudulent and disinformative. The accusations came to light in Lithuanian media after a case in 2009 where Marijonas Misiukonis, then the minister of internal affairs, was brought to court under the charge of murder.

=== Awards ===
In 1998 Kraujelis was awarded the Order of the Cross of Vytis 3rd class by the president's decree. The Lithuanian National Ministry of Defence awarded Kraujelis the rank of senior lieutenant in the same year. Kraujelis' uniform as well as weaponry is exhibited in the Lithuanian National Museum. A monument dedicated to Kraujelis exists at the village in which he died, near which Kraujelis's father and Vytautas Landsbergis jointly planted an oak tree which is now gone.
