= Ubiškė =

- Town
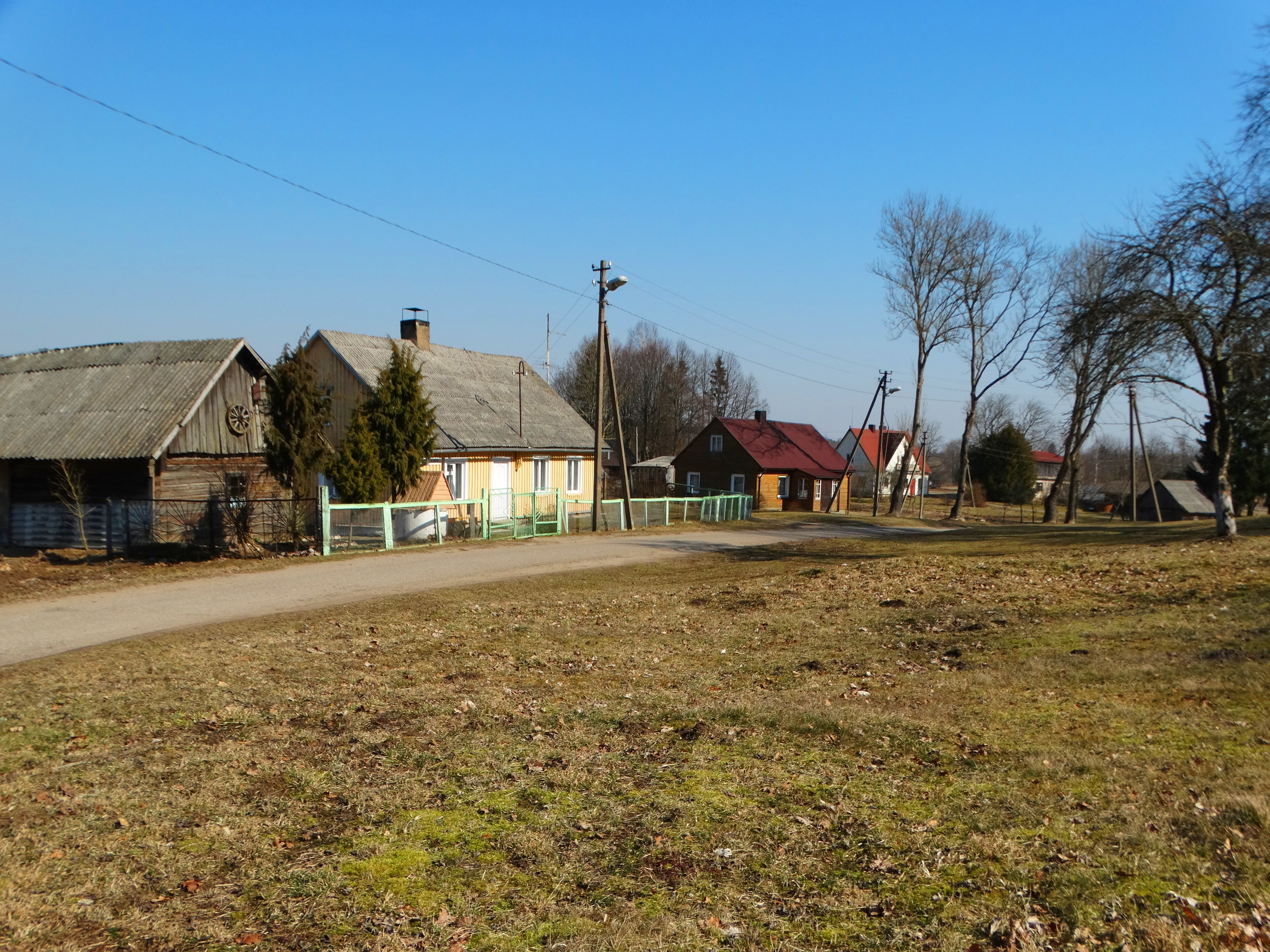

- Location within Lithuania
- Coordinates: 55°59′10″N 22°30′0″E
- Country: Lithuania
- County: Telšiai County
- Municipality: Telšiai district municipality
- Eldership: Tryškiai eldership

Population (2011)
  - Total: 187
- Time zone: UTC+2 (EET)
  - Summer (DST): UTC+3 (EEST)

Ubiškė (Polish: Ubiszki) is a town in Telšiai County, Lithuania. According to the 2011 census, the town has a population of 187 people.
