= Eigirdžiai =

- Town
- Location within Lithuania
- Coordinates: 56°0′29″N 22°22′8″E
- Country: Lithuania
- County: Telšiai County
- Municipality: Telšiai district municipality
- Eldership: Degaičiai eldership

Population (2011)
  - Total: 630
- Time zone: UTC+2 (EET)
  - Summer (DST): UTC+3 (EEST)

Eigirdžiai (Samogitian: Eigėrdē) is a town in Telšiai County, Lithuania. According to the 2011 census, the town had a population of 630 people.

An elementary school was established in 1905, a seven-year, eight-year, and nine-year school since 1950, and a high school since 1993 .
