= Antanas Pakerys =

Antanas Pakerys (born May 14, 1940) is a Lithuanian linguist, expert in Lithuanian phonetics.

He was born in Eiveniai, Dusetos rural municipality , Zarasai County, Lithuania. In 1964 he graduated from the Vilnius Pedagogical Institute (now Vytautas Magnus University Education Academy). He was there a lecturer, professor (since 1987), dean of the Faculty of Lithuanian Language and Literature (1989-1992) and rector (1993-2003). He wrote several books and many articles in Lithuanian phonetics and other linguistic subjects. In 1968 he earned his candidate of science (Ph.D.) degree with thesis Lithuanian: Lietuvių literatūrinės kalbos dvibalsių au, ai, ei akustiniai požymiai and doktor nauk degree (Soviet equivalent of dr.hab.) with thesis Lietuvių bendrinės kalbos prozodija in 1982. He was a member of the State Commission on the Lithuanian Language (1994-2012), and had a number of other scientific and educational duties.

In 2000 he was awarded Officer's Cross of the Order of Gediminas.
