= Antanas Krištopaitis =

Lithuanian painter, ethnographer and social activist

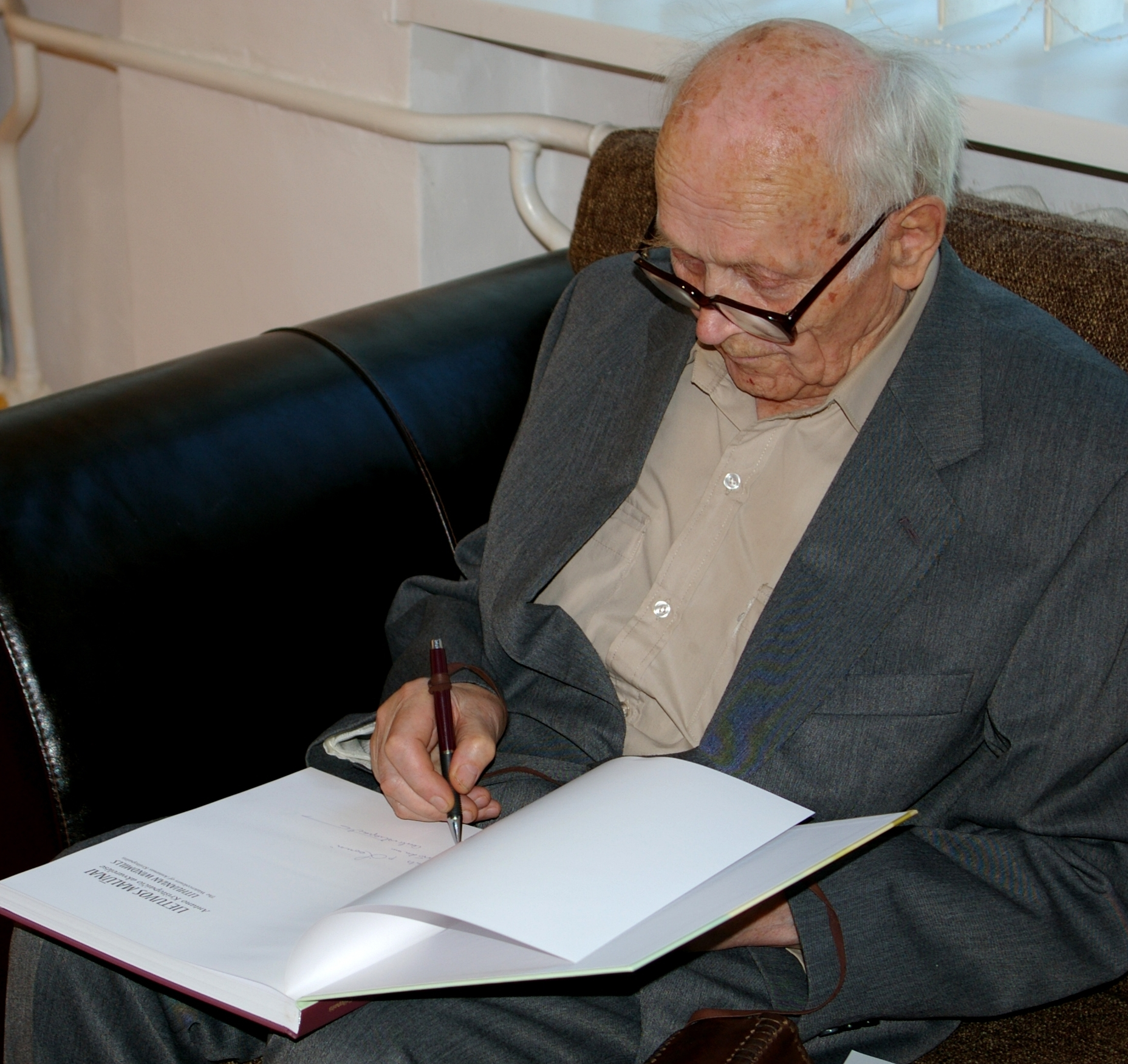
- Antanas Krištopaitis in 2007
- Born: 21 May 1921; Valdomai, Šiauliai district, Lithuania
- Died: 6 May 2011 (aged 89); Šiauliai, Lithuania
- Occupations: Painter, Ethnographer, Social Activist
- Movement: Lithuanian folk art, ethnography

Antanas Krištopaitis (born 21 May 1921 Valdomai, Šiauliai district; died 6 May 2011 Šiauliai) is a Lithuanian painter, ethnographer and social activist. He has painted over 600 paintings of churches in Lithuania and over 200 paintings of windmills.
