= Antanas Belazaras =

Lithuanian composer (1913–1976)

Antanas Belazaras (December 22, 1913 in Upyte, now Panevėžys district – November 15, 1976 in Panevėžys) was a Lithuanian composer.

== Selected works ==
- Dainos ir Romansai ( Songs and Romances) 1998

== Recordings ==
- Литовские Песни, Aleksandra Staškevičiūtė
