= Smilgiai =

- Town
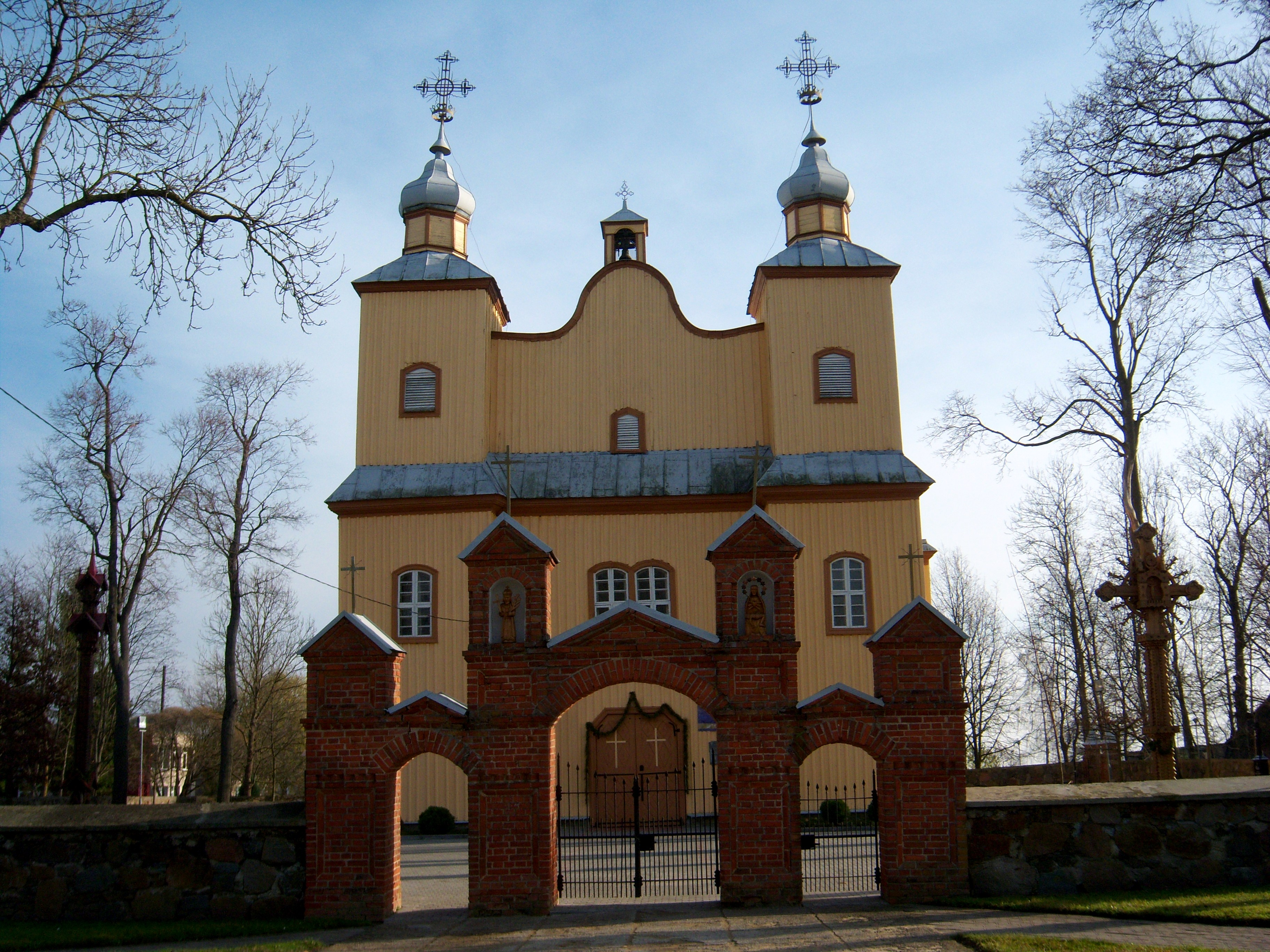

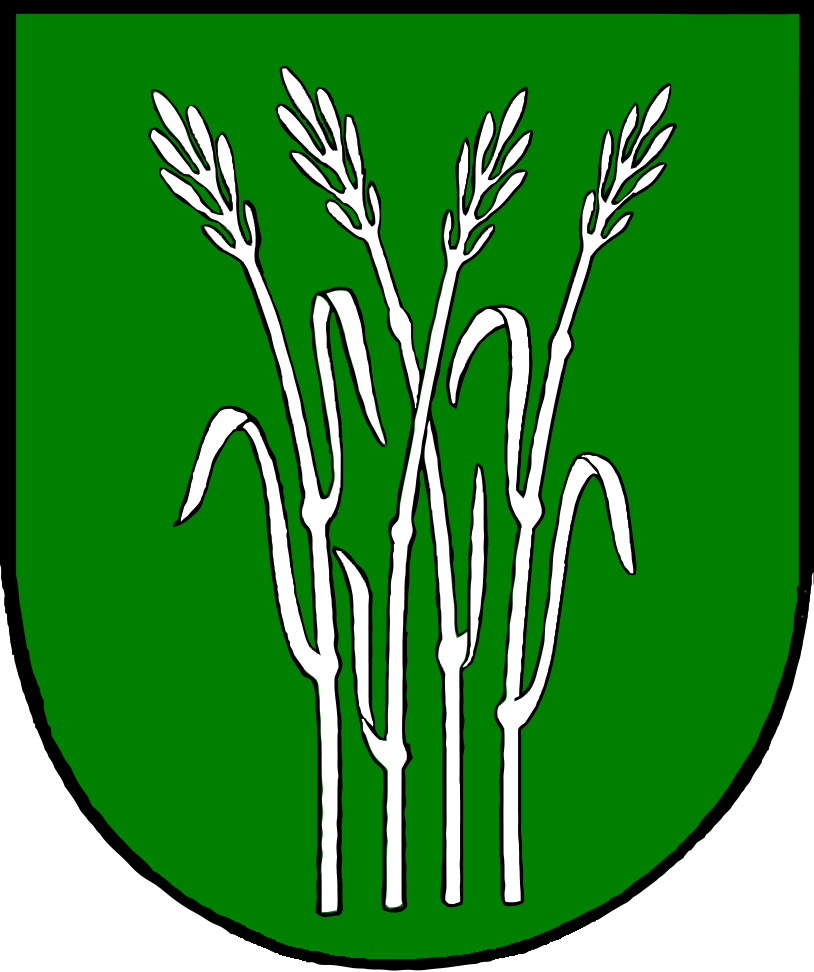
- Coat of arms

- Location within Lithuania
- Coordinates: 55°48′10″N 24°01′00″E
- Country: Lithuania
- County: Panevėžys County

Population (2021)
  - Total: 459
- Time zone: UTC+2 (EET)
  - Summer (DST): UTC+3 (EEST)

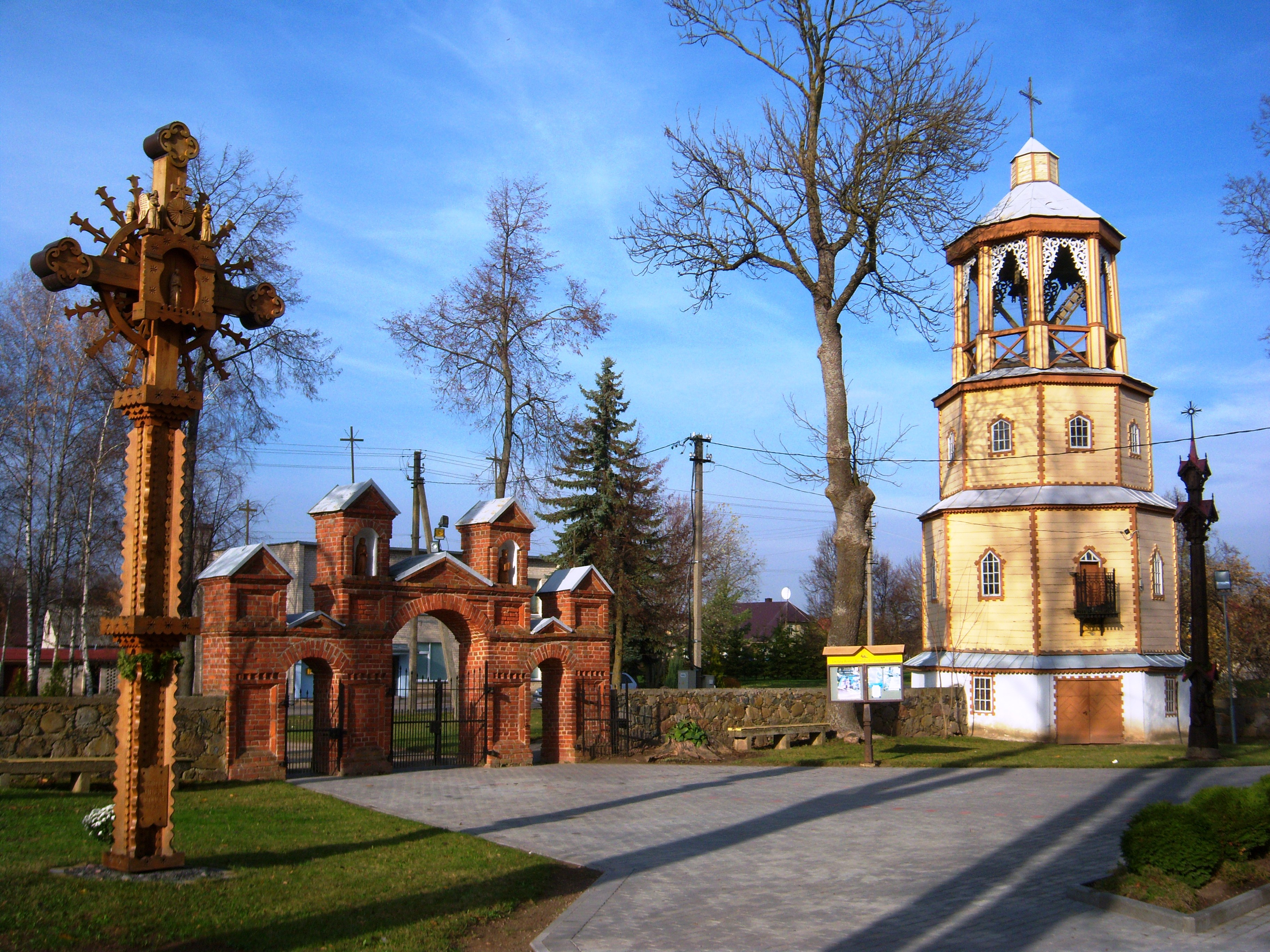
Smilgiai church belfry

Smilgiai is a small town in Panevėžys County, in northeastern Lithuania. According to the 2021 census, the town has a population of 459 people.

Before The Holocaust the town had a Jewish population but they were murdered by the Einsatzgruppen and their Lithuanian collaborators.
