= Antanas Vinkus =

Lithuanian diplomat

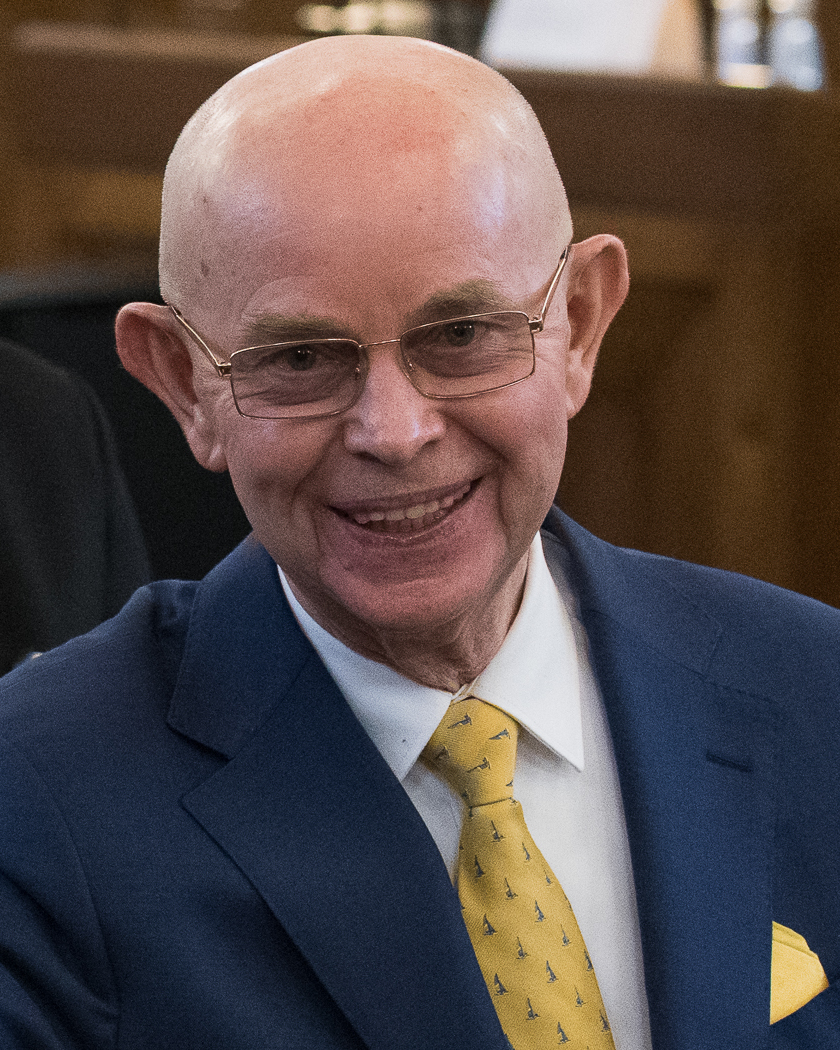

Personal details
- Born: December 25, 1942 (age 83)
- Party: Social Democratic Party of Lithuania
- Other political affiliations: Communist Party of the Soviet Union (historically)
- Spouse: Danutė Vinkuvienė
- Children: Mindaugas Vinkus
- Education: Lithuanian University of Health Sciences Medicine Academy
- Occupation: Doctor, diplomat, and politician

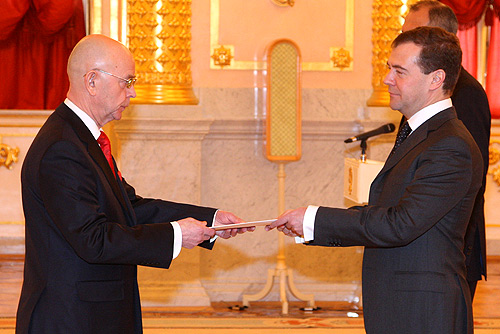
Vinkus presenting his credentials to Dmitry Medvedev in February 2009.

Antanas Vinkus (born December 25, 1942 in Kretinga) is a Lithuanian doctor, diplomat, and politician.

== Biography ==
He was an ambassador of Lithuania to Russia (2009–2011), presenting his credentials to Russian president Dmitry Medvedev on 27 February 2009.

In 2011, Vinkus was elected mayor of the Neringa Municipality.

Seimas
Preceded by Jolita Vaickienė (Kretinga)	Member of the Seimas for Kretinga and Palanga/Kuršas; 2016–present	Incumbent

Preceded by Rimantas Šidlauskas	Ambassador of Lithuania to Russia; 2008–2011	Succeeded by Renatas Norkus
