= Vytautas Kernagis (1976) =

Lithuanian politician

Vytautas Kernagis MP

Member of the Seimas
- Incumbent
- Assumed office 13 November 2020
- Preceded by: Position established
- Constituency: Pašilaičiai
- In office 14 November 2016 – 12 November 2020
- Preceded by: Dainius Kreivys
- Succeeded by: Aistė Gedvilienė
- Constituency: Fabijoniškės

Personal details
- Born: 20 August 1976 (age 50) Vilnius, Lithuania
- Party: Homeland Union
- Spouse: Rima Kernagienė
- Children: 2
- Education: Vilnius College

Vytautas Kernagis (born 20 August 1976 in Vilnius) is a Lithuanian politician, a Member of the Seimas for Pašilaičiai constituency. Also he is a former organizer of Lithuanian public initiatives, Member of the Council of the Association of Related Rights AGATA, Head of the Vytautas Kernagis Foundation.

== Biography ==
Vytautas Kernagis father is musician and performer Vytautas Kernagis, and his mother is costume designer Dalia Kernagienė. Since 1996 until 2000 studied at Vilnius Higher School of Electronics. In 2005, he defended his bachelor's thesis at the Faculty of Electronics and Informatics of Vilnius College. Between 2008 and 2016 Kernagisfounded and managed the Vytautas Kernagis Charity and Support Foundation, the main goals of which are to preserve the memory of Vytautas Kernagis, carry out the dissemination of new creative ideas and organize help for patients with oncological diseases. Over the past 8 years, he has created over 70 educational and cultural projects, including performances, festivals, concert programs, children's stage mastery camps, non-formal education workshops, publishing, and more. In November 2016 he became Member of the Seimas of the Republic of Lithuania for Fabijoniškės constituency.

Seimas
Preceded by Dainius Kreivys	Member of the Seimas for Fabijoniškės; 2016–2020	Succeeded by Aistė Gedvilienė
New constituency	Member of the Seimas for Pašilaičiai; 2020–present	Incumbent
