= Kreivys =

- Lithuanian surname
- m.: Kreivys
- f.: (unmarried): Kreivienė
- f.: (married): Kreivytė

Kreivys is a Lithuanian surname derived from the nickname "Kreivys", meaning "crooked, a person with crooked legs; a hunchbacked person; a crooked-handed person". The feminine forms of the name are Kreivienė (unmarried) and Kreivytė (married).

Notable people with the surname include:

- Dainius Kreivys, Lithuanian businessman and politician
- Dalia Kreivienė (born 1972), Lithuanian diplomat
- Ona Kreivytė-Naruševičienė, Lithuanian ceramic artist
- Rasa Kreivytė, Lithuanian basketball player
- Zita Kreivytė, Lithuanian fashion designer and artist
