= Sinkevičius =

Sinkevičius is the masculine form of a Lithuanian family name. Its feminine forms are: Sinkevičienė (married woman or widow) and Sinkevičiūtė (unmarried woman).

- Rimantas Sinkevičius (born 1952), Lithuanian politician, Minister of Transport
- Mindaugas Sinkevičius (born 1984), Lithuanian politician, former Minister of Economy and Mayor of Jonava
- Virginijus Sinkevičius (born 1990), Lithuanian politician, European Commissioner for Environment, Oceans and Fisheries
