= Marius Skuodis =

Lithuanian politician

22nd Minister of Transport and Communications
- In office 11 December 2020 – 12 December 2024
- Prime Minister: Ingrida Šimonytė
- Preceded by: Jaroslav Narkevič
- Succeeded by: Eugenijus Sabutis

Deputy Minister of Economy and Innovation
- In office 16 January 2018 – 11 December 2020
- Minister: Virginijus Sinkevičius; Rimantas Sinkevičius

Personal details
- Born: 9 August 1985 (age 41) Vilnius, Lithuania
- Party: Independent
- Spouse: Rita Skuodienė
- Education: Vilnius University; London School of Economics

Marius Skuodis (born 9 August 1985) is a Lithuanian politician, economist, Member of the Board of the Bank of Lithuania, former Minister of Transport and Communications in the Šimonytė Cabinet.

== Biography ==
He graduated from high school in 2004. In 2008 he graduated from Vilnius University Institute of International Relations and Political Science with a bachelor's degree in political sciences. In 2010 he obtained a master's degree in European Studies at Vilnius University Institute of International Relations and Political Science. From 2012 he holds a second master's degree of Public Administration in Public and Economic Policy from the London School of Economics. Since 2018 he is PhD in Social Sciences.

From 2006 to 2010 he was a Member of the Board of the Lithuanian State Science and Studies Foundation.

Between 2008 and 2009 he worked as a Chief Specialist of the European Union Policy Department of the Office of the Government of Lithuania.

Since 2009 until 2010 he was an Analyst at the Public Policy and Management Institute.

From 2012 to 2015 he worked at the Bank of Lithuania as a Senior Specialist of the International Relations Department. Between 2015 and 2018 he worked as the Director of the International Relations Department of the Bank of Lithuania.

Since 2012 until 2016 he was a lecturer at the Vilnius University Institute of International Relations and Political Science.

From 2018 to 2020 he was Deputy Minister of Economy and Innovation of Lithuania.

From 2020 to 2024, he served as Minister of Transport and Communications of the Republic of Lithuania.

After the end of the Government's term, he returned to the Bank of Lithuania, where he has served as a Member of the Board since March 26, 2025.

== Sources ==
- https://eimin.lrv.lt/lt/struktura-ir-kontaktai/vadovybe/marius-skuodis
- https://www.lrt.lt/naujienos/lietuvoje/2/1292085/laisves-partija-i-susisiekimo-ministrus-siulys-dabartini-ekonomikos-viceministra-skuodi
