= Litauen =

Litauen may refer to:

- Litauen, the modern name for Lithuania in several languages
- Lithuania District (German: Litauen Sud), an administrative division of the German Empire from 1915 to 1918
- Generalbezirk Litauen, an administrative division of the Reichskommissariat Ostland of Nazi Germany from 1941 to 1944

== See also ==
- Lithuania (disambiguation)
