= Aistė Gedvilienė =

Lithuanian politician

Aistė Gedvilienė MP

Member of the Seimas
- Incumbent
- Assumed office 13 November 2020
- Preceded by: Vytautas Kernagis
- Constituency: Fabijoniškės
- In office 9 July 2019 – 12 November 2020
- Preceded by: Rasa Juknevičienė
- Constituency: Multi-member

Personal details
- Born: 17 September 1985 (age 41) Kaunas, Lithuania
- Party: Homeland Union
- Spouse: Paulius Gedvilas
- Children: 1
- Education: Kaunas University of Technology; Mykolas Romeris University

Aistė Gedvilienė (born September 17, 1985, in Kaunas) is a Lithuanian politician, a Member of the Seimas for Fabijoniškės constituency since 13 November 2020. Also she is a former Executive Secretary of Homeland Union - Lithuanian Christian Democrats.

== Career ==
In 200,8 Gedvilienė graduated from Mykolas Romeris University. She holds a bachelor's degree in law.

From 2008 to 2009, she was Kaunas District Municipality Administration Urban Planning Division Chief Specialist. From 2009 to 2010, Gedvilienė took place in Kaunas District Municipality Administration as Legal Division Chief Specialist. From 2010 to 2012, she was assistant to the Ministry of Social Security and Labour. She was Deputy Executive Secretary of the Homeland Union from 2013 to 2014, and in 2017-2019 Executive Secretary. From 2014 to 2015, Gedvilienė was an adviser to Gabrielius Landsbergis when he was MEP. From 7 July 2019 she replaced Rasa Juknevičienė as Member of the Seimas.
