= Alumni association =

Association of former students

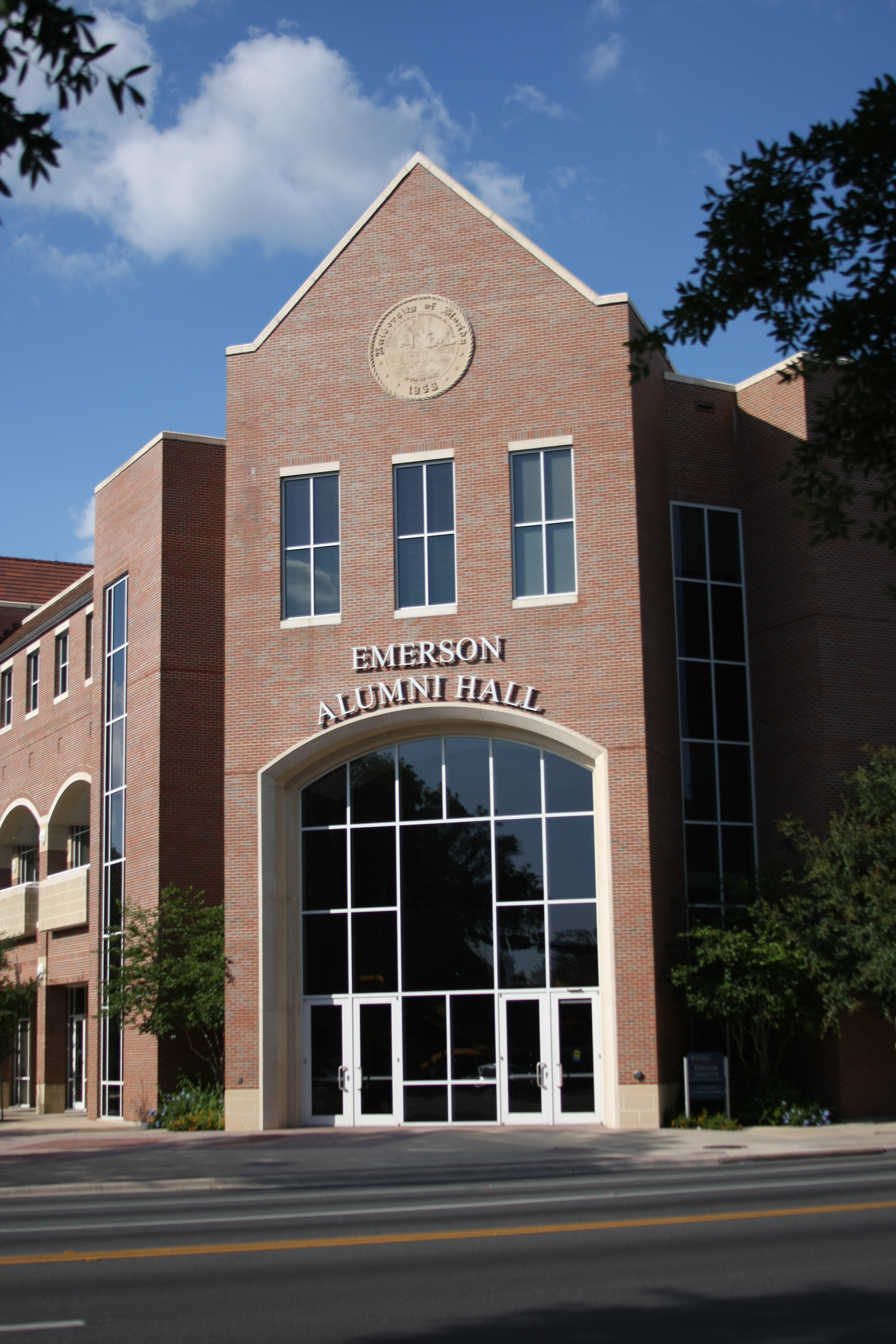
University of Florida Emerson Alumni Hall

An alumni association or alumnae association is an association of graduates or, more broadly, of former students (alumni). In the United Kingdom and the United States, alumni of universities, colleges, schools (especially independent schools), fraternities, and sororities often form groups with alumni from the same organization. These associations often organize social events, publish newsletters or magazines, and raise funds for the organization. Many provide a variety of benefits and services that help alumni maintain connections to their educational institution and fellow graduates.

Additionally, such groups often support new alumni, and provide a forum to form new friendships and business relationships with people of similar background.

Alumni associations are mainly organized around universities or departments of universities, but may also be organized among students that studied in a certain country. In the past, they were often considered to be the university's or school's old boy society (or old boy network). Today, alumni associations involve graduates of all age groups and demographics.

Alumni associations are often organized into chapters by city, region, or country.

The Society of Alumni of Williams College, founded in 1821, claims to be "the oldest continuing college or university alumni organization in the world".

== See also ==
- Corporate alumni
