= Dainius Kreivys =

Lithuanian politician

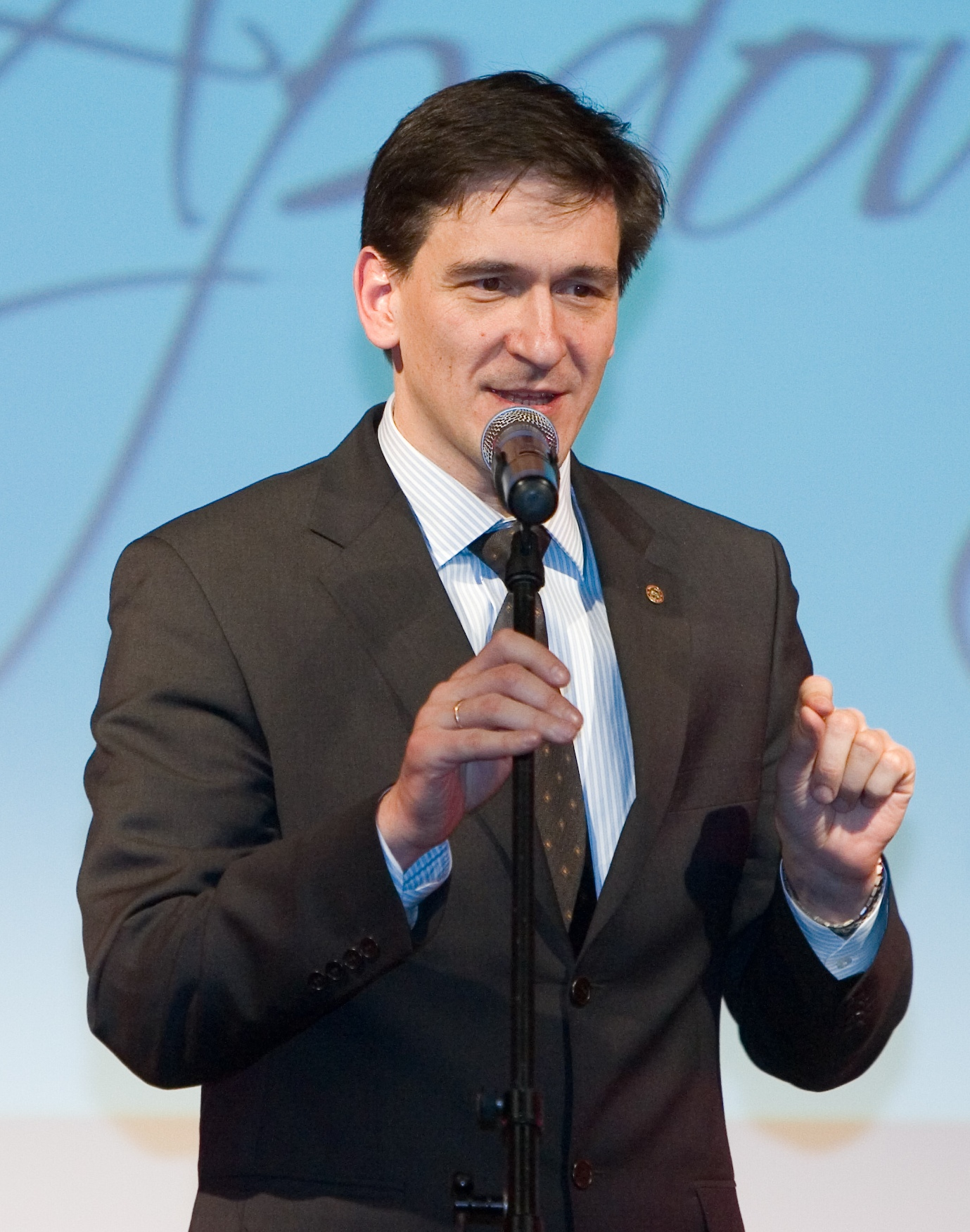
- Kreivys in 2010

13th Minister for Energy
- In office 11 December 2020 – 12 December 2024
- Prime Minister: Ingrida Šimonytė
- Preceded by: Žygimantas Vaičiūnas
- Succeeded by: Žygimantas Vaičiūnas

Member of the Seimas
- Incumbent
- Assumed office 14 November 2016
- Preceded by: Constituency established
- Constituency: Verkiai
- In office 16 November 2012 – 13 November 2016
- Preceded by: Raimondas Šukys
- Succeeded by: Vytautas Kernagis
- Constituency: Fabijoniškės

20th Minister for Economy of Lithuania
- In office 9 December 2008 – 17 March 2011
- President: Valdas Adamkus; Dalia Grybauskaitė
- Prime Minister: Andrius Kubilius
- Preceded by: Vytas Navickas
- Succeeded by: Rimantas Žylius

Personal details
- Born: 8 April 1970 (age 56) Jonava, Soviet Union (now Lithuania)
- Party: Homeland Union
- Spouse: Dalia Kreivienė
- Children: Daumantas Kreivys
- Education: Baltic Management Institute, BMI Lithuanian University of Educational Sciences

Dainius Kreivys (born 8 April 1970) is a Lithuanian businessman and politician who served as the Minister of Economy of Lithuania from 2008 to 2011 and is a member of Seimas since 2012. He is a member of the conservative political party Homeland Union – Lithuanian Christian Democrats.

On 7 December 2020, he was approved to be the Minister of Energy in the Šimonytė Cabinet.

== Minister of Economy (2009-2011) ==
D. Kreivys took the position as minister of economy in December 2008 and mostly focused business support measures during economic crisis, simplification of business regulation and improvement of investment environment.

The Ministry of Economy of the Republic of Lithuania supervised the implementation of business support plan, introduced in 2009 to help businesses survive the impact of economic crisis.

D. Kreivys was the initiator of the public procurement reform and supervised its implementation. The reform aimed to increase procurement efficiency, transparency and economize tax payers' money by centralization, moving online, making all the data available online. During the first year of the reform, the priced in public procurement fell by a third. The reform resulted in LTL 3.1 billion saving of taxpayers' money in two years.

Following OECD recommendations, D. Kreivys initiated the reform of state-owned enterprises (SOE reform) which aimed to depoliticize state-owned asset management, increase transparency, efficiency and returns to the state of SOEs. As part of the reform, Ministry of Economy published the first annual review of Lithuanian state-owned commercial property in 2010, which revealed that state-owned enterprises managed about 18 billion LTL worth of commercial property, bringing only about LTL 44,8 million LTL to the state budget as dividends. The review was followed by the adoption of Transparency Guidelines that required all state-owned enterprises to prepare annual and interim financial statements, to make public the company's goals and objectives, financial and other performance, number of employees, salary funds, monthly salary of company executives and their deputies, purchases and investments made. As a result of SOE reform, Governance Coordination Centre was founded to promote the introduction of good governance principles at SOEs; SOEs returns to the state increased up to MEUR 149 in 2019.

D. Kreivys aimed to make Lithuania Northern European hub for Shared Service centres. Together with the then Prime Minister Andrius Kubilius, D. Kreivys initiated launches of the first large global service centres – Barclays, Western Union and others – in Lithuania. Today, there are 81 global business service centre in Lithuania.

In 2010, seeking to increase foreign direct investment and improve investment environment, Kreivys initiated Investment Advisory Council. The council, composed of chief executive officers of global companies, submitted its recommendations to the Lithuanian Government on investment policies and regulations.

== Resignation ==
In March 2011, The Chief Official Ethics Commission has ruled that D. Kreivys, while allocating EU financial support to schools, has not fulfilled the statutory requirement to avoid conflicts of interest and to act in order to avoid any doubt that such a conflict exists. After President Dalia Grybauskaitė publicly expressed her distrust of the Minister, D. Kreivys resigned. Seven years later, in 2018, media published leaked documents from State Security Department of Lithuania, which revealed that Kreivys' resignation was a result of carefully planned slander campaign.

== Target of slander campaign ==
In 2018, Lithuanian media published leaked material, presented by State Security Department of Lithuania to the Parliament's National Security and Defense Committee, on activities of MG Baltic, one of the biggest business groups in Lithuania. The document covers groups' activities in 2006-2017 that aimed to influence authorities in various illegal ways (collecting confidential or compromising information, bribery, blackmailing, manipulating information) in order to secure financial benefits and power.

The findings of the material recognized MG Baltic as a threat to national security because of its destructive activities.

State Security Department's material states, that Minister of Economy D. Kreivys was one of MG Baltic targets since he did not make decisions that were beneficial to MG Baltic. As means of influence, MG Baltic representatives disseminated information that compromised and slandered D. Kreivys through the media controlled by MG Baltic. D. Kreivys was then forced to resign.

== Conflict of interest judgements, resignation, ongoing influence-peddling case, fresh allegations ==
In 2011 Kreivys resigned as minister of the economy following public comment from President Grybauskaitė that he had lost confidence due to conflict of interest following inquiries by European Anti-Fraud Office (OLAF) and Chief Official Ethics Commission of Lithuania for approving European Union (EU) funding for a nation-wide school renovation program benefiting business interests of his immediate family. While minister Kreivys granted 6 million litas (~1.74 million euros) of EU funding to a company formally owned by his mother but was controlled by Kreivys directly immediately before and after his ministerial assignment.

Official Ethics Commission stated in its findings, among other points, that Kreivys failed to conform to the law requiring public servants to declare their private interests in a timely manner and supplied incorrect data pertaining to a possible conflict of interest. Kreivys attempted to sue the Chief Official Ethics Commission and lost. Kreivys was subsequently also found guilty of a conflict of interest in 2013 by the OLAF for formally transferring his business interests to his mother, granting her EU funding thanks to his position as minister of the economy and, after leaving the ministerial post, formally re-acquiring the business interests from her. OLAF demanded Lithuanian government return the funding granted (the funding was never returned by the Kreivys family companies); commented that the public procurement tender by Municipality of Vilnius won by Kreivienė's company was also unlawful; and commented that the person who chose the tender winner later became Kreivys' ministerial advisor.

Kreivys was also implicated in alleged influence peddling while minister of the economy on behalf of BOD Group, a solar energy business, which resulted in 14 million euros in EU funding for the company in 2009. The matter was still being decided by the prosecutor general as late as 2020.

In 2011, after Kreivys left his ministerial assignment, his mother's businesses were granted 1 million litas (289,620 euros) of EU funding for training purposes by two other conservative government ministers, in an alleged conflict of interest.

In 2017, Kreivys was noted to have been spending his parliamentary vehicle allowance renting a car from a company owned by himself.

In 2018, Kreivys companies were noted to have used creative accounting to maximize their benefit from Lithuania's solar power subsidies, taking advantage of a loophole capping subsidies per company but not per ultimate beneficiary.

In 2020, a Kreivys company was convicted of construction based on an unlawful permit in Vilnius and would have had to demolish the building; however it signed a peace agreement with the Municipality of Vilnius and was spared. The company built apartments instead of a public building with social apartments for low-income citizens on its upper floors. Before becoming minister again in 2020, Kreivys' potential conflicts of interest were the main topic of discussion with President Nausėda.

In 2022 Kreivys' spouse, Dalia Kreivienė, was nominated by the cabinet (of which Kreivys was a member) for the position of the ambassador to Italy. This again raised concerns about a potential conflict of interest, although D. Kreiviene serves in diplomatic corps since 1998. Concerns were denied and nomination was publicly supported by the President G. Nausėda, as well as Prime Minister I. Šimonytė.

== Minister of Energy ==
D. Kreivys was appointed minister of energy in December 2020. His priorities were the suspension of trade in electricity from the Belarusian NPP, earlier synchronization with continental Europe and the growth of domestic electricity generation. As a result, during his term in the office, local renewable generation capacities grew fourfold, and ensured 62 percent of overall country's electricity consumption, while number of prosumers grew twelvefold – from less than 10 thousand prosumers in 2020 to over 120 thousand by the end of 2024.

D. Kreivys actively opposed the construction of the unsafe Belarusian NPP and, as a member of the opposition, criticised his predecessor for failing to ensure that Lithuania would no longer trade electricity with Belarus. During Kreivys' term in office, electricity trade with Belarus in Lithuania and the Baltic States has been completely disrupted.

In 2021, in the face of a hybrid attack - a wave of illegal migrants from Belarus - the state-owned energy group EPSO-G (shareholder: Ministry of Energy) was tasked with the construction of a continuous physical barrier with Belarus, more than 550 km long. The project was completed in August 2022 in record time and under budget.

Following the start of the Russian invasion of Ukraine, Lithuania was the first country in Europe to stop importing gas from Russia and later to completely halt import of Russian energy resources.

D. Kreivys is also actively pursuing the earlier synchronisation of the Baltic States with the continental European networks. On 22 April 2023, an isolated operation test was performed, during which the Lithuanian electricity network was disconnected from the IPS/UPS system controlled by Russia and operated completely independently for the first time. The isolated operation test is one of the most important steps in preparing for the synchronisation of the electrical system with continental Europe. On October 31, 2024, D. Kreivys launched a countdown clock counting 100 days until synchronization, which marked full preparation of electricity system for the synchronization in February 2025.

To ensure smooth and rapid growth of renewable generation, D. Kreivys initiated a package of legislative amendments aimed at reducing red tape and excessive restrictions, as well as creating favourable conditions for the development of renewable energy projects. The legislative package was approved by Seimas in June 2022. In 2024, the Parliament also adopted an updated National Energy Independence Strategy (NENS), prepared under the leadership of minister D. Kreivys, which will enable Lithuania to become a fully climate-neutral country by 2050, exporting electricity from renewable sources.

During his term in the office, D. Kreivys laid foundations for offshore wind development: two tenders for offshore wind farms were launched. Once operational, the two 1.4 GW offshore wind farms will provide half of Lithuania's current electricity needs, significantly reduce dependence on electricity imports and ensure attractive electricity prices for residents and businesses.

The launch of The Gas Interconnection Poland-Lithuania (GIPL) pipeline link between Lithuania and Poland, installation of Europe's largest 200 MW battery system, taking ownership of LNG terminal Independence are among other significant milestones in Lithuania's energy sector achieved during D. Kreivys service in the office.

Under the supervision of the Ministry of Energy, Lithuania is providing ongoing assistance to Ukraine's energy sector: more than €50 million worth of equipment will be handed over to Ukraine by Lithuanian energy companies.

== Motion of no confidence ==
In September 2022 Kreivys was subject to an interpellation (motion of no confidence) by the Seimas, in spite of the governing coalition having parliamentary majority. The interpellation was initiated by 62 opposition members, who raised questions about the high electricity prices due to the critical situation in the energy sector. In response to the questions, Mr Kreivys said that the main factor was the tenfold increase natural gas prices due to Russia's energy war against Europe. The interpellation failed, with more than half of the Seimas voting in favour of Kreivys continuing as Minister.

== Patriotism ==
D. Kreivys' family included a number of Lithuanian freedom fighters. His grandfather, Viktoras Kreivys, was a volunteer in 1918, when Lithuania declared its independence. Grandfather's brother, father's uncle Augustas Kreivys was a Lithuanian volunteer killed in one of the battles for Lithuania's independence. His mother's uncle Ksaveras Stepšys was a partisan killed in 1949 during Lithuanian guerrilla warfare against the Soviet Union in 1944–1953.

D. Kreivys was actively involved in Lithuania's rise for restored independence: he was member of Lithuanian National Youth Union 'Jaunoji Lietuva' (1988–1993), collected and returned Soviet military tickets, participated in all rallies, protests and marches against Soviet occupation (for instance, demolition of monuments Soviet figures in Lithuania). His son Daumantas is named after the pseudonym of one of the leaders of the anti-Soviet Lithuanian partisan armed resistance movement, Juozas Lukša-Daumantas.

== Personal life ==
D. Kreivys is married. His wife Dalia is an official of the Ministry of Foreign Affairs of the Republic of Lithuania. The couple have a son, Daumantas, and a daughter, Gabrielė Marija.

== Family wealth ==
Kreivys and his wife (director of external economic policy at Ministry of Foreign Affairs of Lithuania) were ranked as 4th and 5th wealthiest politicians & public servants in 2020. Kreivys' mother Florentina Kreivienė was ranked as the 5th wealthiest woman in Lithuania in 2011 with a net worth of more than 49 million euros.

== Religion ==
D. Kreivys is a practicing Catholic.

In 2009 Kreivys was revealed as member of Opus Dei together with Rokas Masiulis and other Lithuanian elites. Many of Kreivys professional collaborators are also members of the Christian society and 74.2 per cent of Lithuanian population are Catholics.

The manner in which the article was written raised questions about its objectivity and whether it was aimed at discrediting D. Kreivys' reputation.

Seimas
Preceded by Raimondas Šukys	Member of the Seimas for Fabijoniškės; 2012–2016	Succeeded by Vytautas Kernagis
New constituency	Member of the Seimas for Verkiai; 2016–present	Incumbent
