= Create Ukraine =

Ukrainian government programme

- Create Ukraine (English)

Government agency overview
- Formed: 2024; 1 year ago
- Jurisdiction: Ukraine
- Headquarters: Kyiv, Ukraine.
- Employees: 10
- Parent department: Ministry of Economy (Ukraine) and Kyiv School of Economics
- Website: Official page

Create Ukraine is a Ukrainian government program created to support innovation and best practices in the Ukrainian public sector. It was created with support from Lithuania and EU and is modelled after Lithuania's Create Lithuania.

Create Ukraine is curated by Ministry of Economy (Ukraine) and Kyiv School of Economics.

== See also ==
- Verkhovna Rada
- Ministry of Economy (Ukraine)
- Kyiv School of Economics
