= Jonava Jeronimas Ralys Gymnasium =

- Jonavos Jeronimo Ralio gimnazija
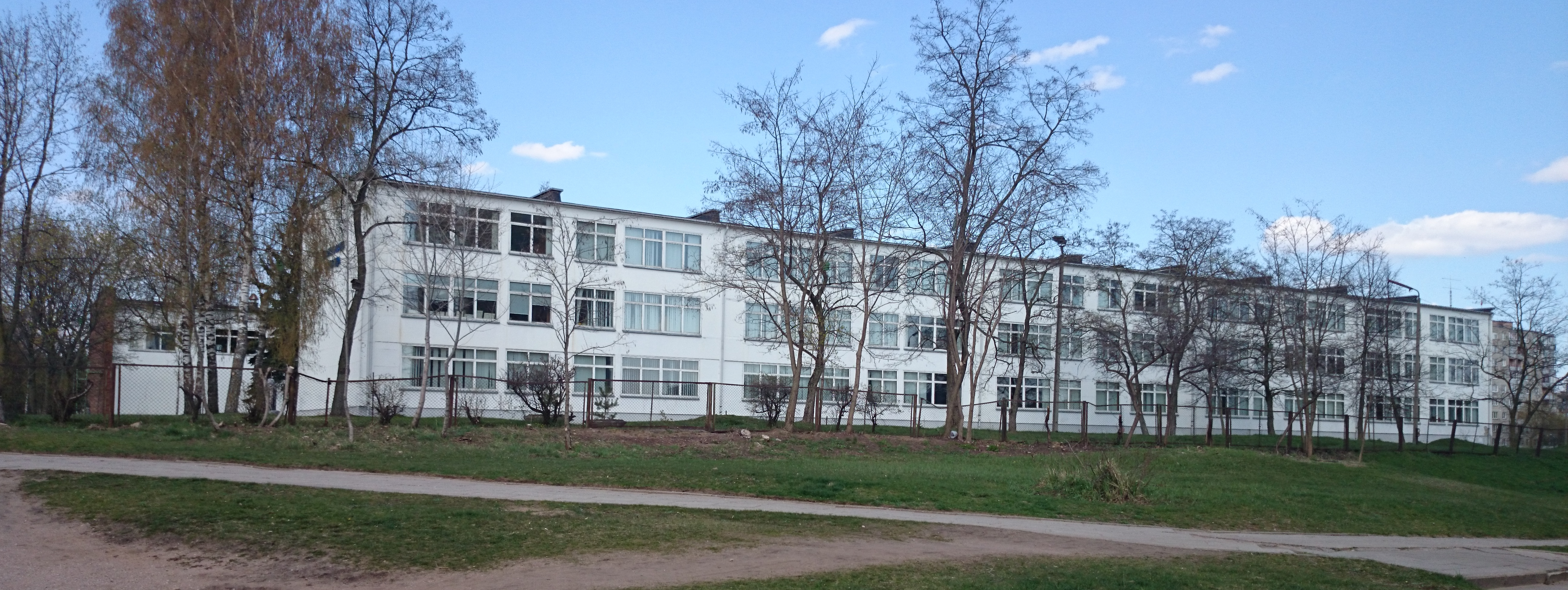

Location
- 20 Žeimiai Str. Jonava, LT-55125; Lithuania
- Coordinates: 55°4′50″N 24°16′30″E

Information
- Type: Public, grades 9–12
- Established: 1941
- Principal: Zita Gudonavičienė
- Employees: 76 (July 2022)
- Enrollment: 565
- Language: Lithuanian
- Website: http://www.jralio.lt

Jonavos Jeronimo Ralio gimnazija (transl. Jonava Jeronimas Ralys Gymnasium) is a public gymnasium in Jonava, Lithuania. It was founded in 1941 and includes grades 9–12. The gymnasium's anthem was changed several times because of politic structure changes in Lithuania. The current anthem was recognized in 2011.

== Headmasters ==
- 1988-2019 Arūnas Rimkus (b. 1960)
- From 2020.01.02 Zita Gudonavičienė

== Notable alumni ==
- Artūras Zuokas ( b. 1968), entrepreneur and politician, former mayor of Vilnius
- Darius Maskoliūnas (b. 1971), basketball coach and former player, politician
- Julius Sabatauskas (b. 1958), politician, member of Seimas
- Eugenijus Sabutis (b. 1975), politician, Mayor of Jonava (since 2016)
