= Jaroslav Narkevič =

Lithuanian politician (born 1962)

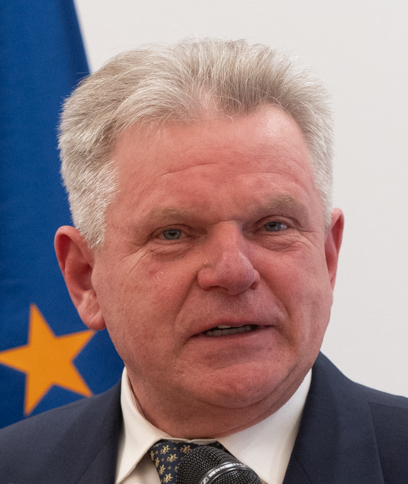
(2026)

Jaroslav Narkevič (Polish: Jarosław Narkiewicz, born 1 January 1962) is a Lithuanian politician. He served as Minister of Transport and Communications in the cabinet of Prime Minister Saulius Skvernelis from 7 August 2019 to 11 December 2020.

Political offices
Preceded by Rokas Masiulis	Minister of Agriculture; 2019–2020	Succeeded by Marius Skuodis
