= Juras Taminskas =

Lithuanian politician (born 1986)

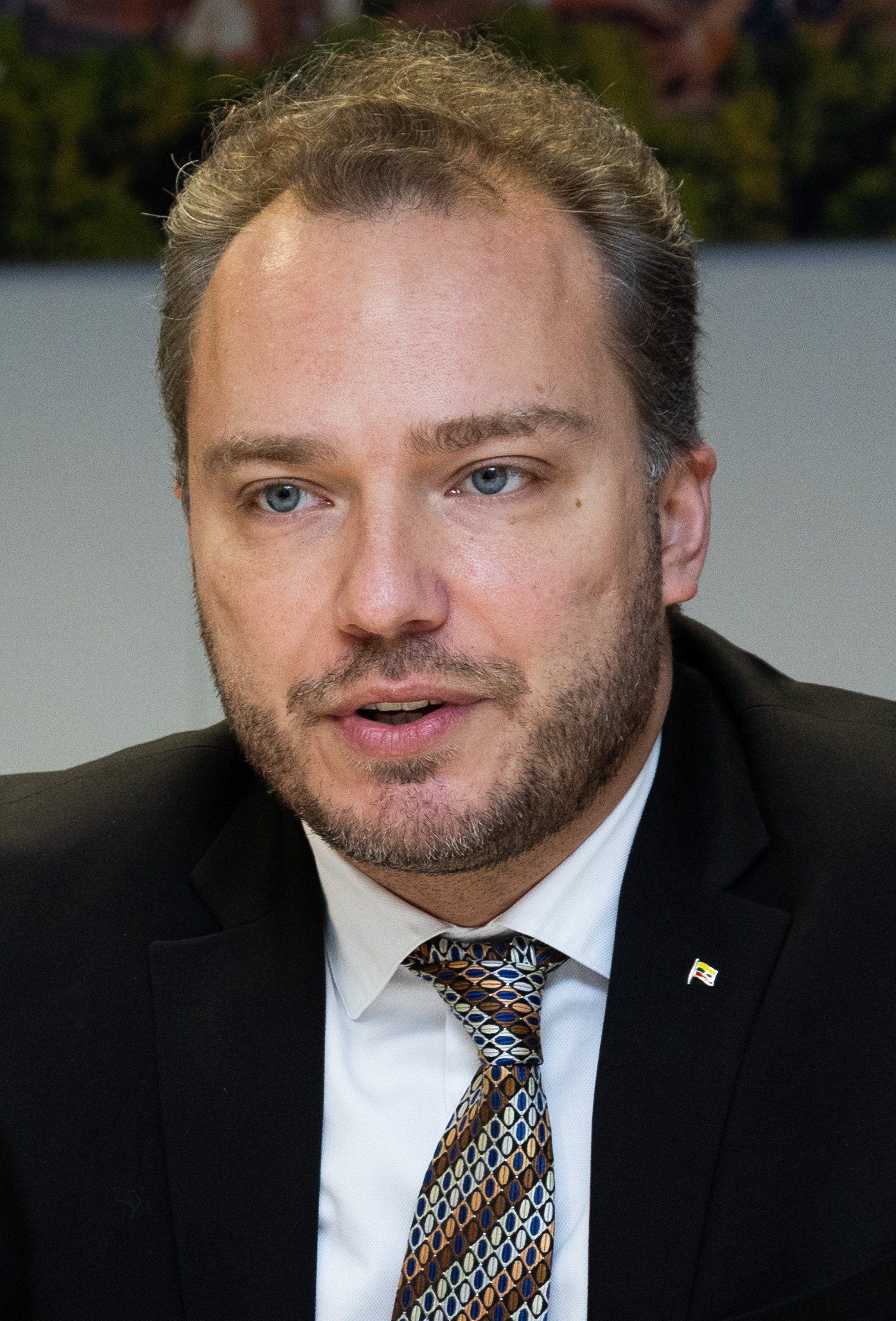
- Taminskas in 2025

Minister of Transport and Communications
- Incumbent
- Assumed office 25 September 2025
- Prime Minister: Inga Ruginienė; Mindaugas Sinkevičius
- Preceded by: Eugenijus Sabutis

Personal details
- Born: 1986 (age 39–40)
- Party: Social Democratic Party of Lithuania

Juras Taminskas (born 1986) is a Lithuanian politician serving as minister of transport and communications since 2025. From 2024 to 2025, he served as legal advisor to the Association of Lithuanian Municipalities.
