= Jonas Biržiškis =

Lithuanian politician (1932–2025)

Jonas Biržiškis (12 April 1932 – 25 September 2025) was a Lithuanian politician who served as Minister of Transport and Communications. He died on 25 September 2025, at the age of 93.
