= Rokas Masiulis =

Lithuanian politician

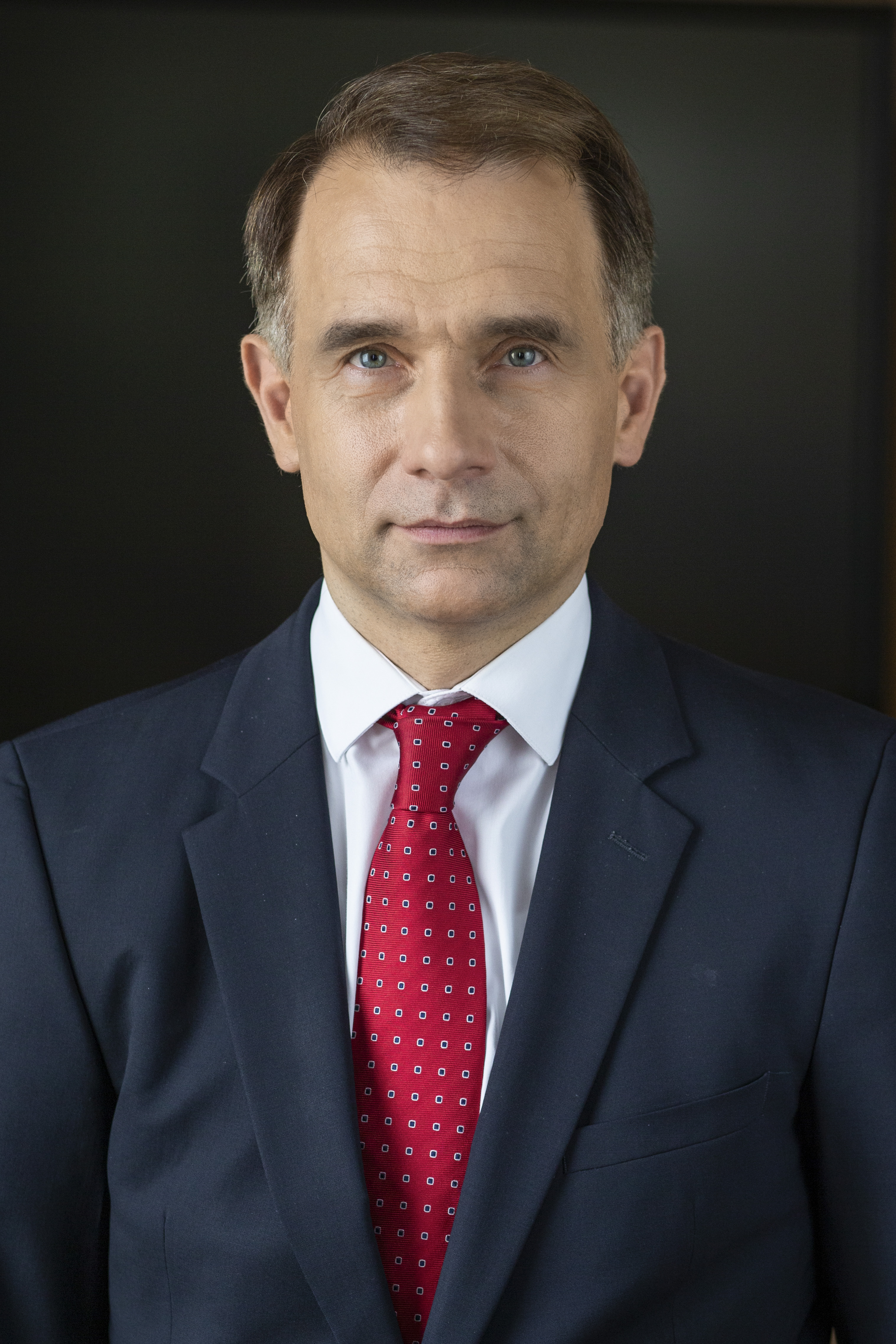

Minister of Transport and Communications
- In office 13 December 2016 – 7 August 2019
- Prime Minister: Saulius Skvernelis
- Preceded by: Rimantas Sinkevičius
- Succeeded by: Jaroslav Narkevič

Minister of Energy
- In office 25 September 2014 – 13 December 2016
- Prime Minister: Algirdas Butkevičius
- Preceded by: Jaroslavas Neverovičius
- Succeeded by: Žygimantas Vaičiūnas

CEO of Litgrid since 2021

Personal details
- Born: 6 August 1969 (age 57) Vilnius, Lithuania
- Party: Independent
- Education: Vilnius University

Rokas Masiulis (born 6 August 1969) is a senior manager and a Lithuanian politician. He is former Minister of Transport and Communications of Lithuania and Minister of Energy of Lithuania. He is the chief executive officer of Litgrid.

== Early life and studies ==
Born in Vilnius, Rokas Masiulis holds a degree in International Relations and Political Science as well as master's degree in Economics from Vilnius University.

== Career ==
He spent 15 years working in private sectoring, including companies such as Arthur Andersen LLP and Ernst & Young. Before joining the government, Masiulis was CEO and later also as a member of the Board of Directors at the state-controlled oil terminal operator Klaipėdos Nafta. During his term as CEO of Klaipėdos Nafta, Masiulis was in charge of the implementation of LNG terminal project. LNG terminal has started its operation in December 2014. The import facility FSRU Independence was essential in breaking the monopoly of Russia's Gazprom over gas supplies to Lithuania, Latvia and Estonia. Masiulis was also CEO of Lithuania's natural gas trading company LITGAS and Director of Business Development as well as Finance of LEO LT, an electricity holding company.
