= Lithuania (disambiguation) =

Lithuania is a country in Europe.

Lithuania may also refer to:

== Historical political entities ==
- Grand Duchy of Lithuania (1236–1795)
- Kingdom of Lithuania (1251–63)
- Duchy of Lithuania (13th century–1413)
- Kingdom of Lithuania (1918)
- Republic of Central Lithuania (1920–1922)
- Lithuanian Soviet Socialist Republic (1940–1941, 1944–1990)

== Other uses ==
- Create Lithuania, Lithuanian government agency
- Lithuania (European Parliament constituency)
- Sports teams listed in Category:National sports teams of Lithuania, and called "Lithuania"
- "Lithuania", a song by Big Sean from Detroit 2

== See also ==
- Lithuania Minor, an ethnographically Lithuanian region in Prussia
- Lituanica, an airplane flown from the United States across the Atlantic Ocean by Lithuanian pilots Steponas Darius and Stasys Girėnas in 1933
