= Ministry of Transport and Communications (Lithuania) =

Government ministry of Lithuania

- Susisiekimo ministerija (in Lithuanian)

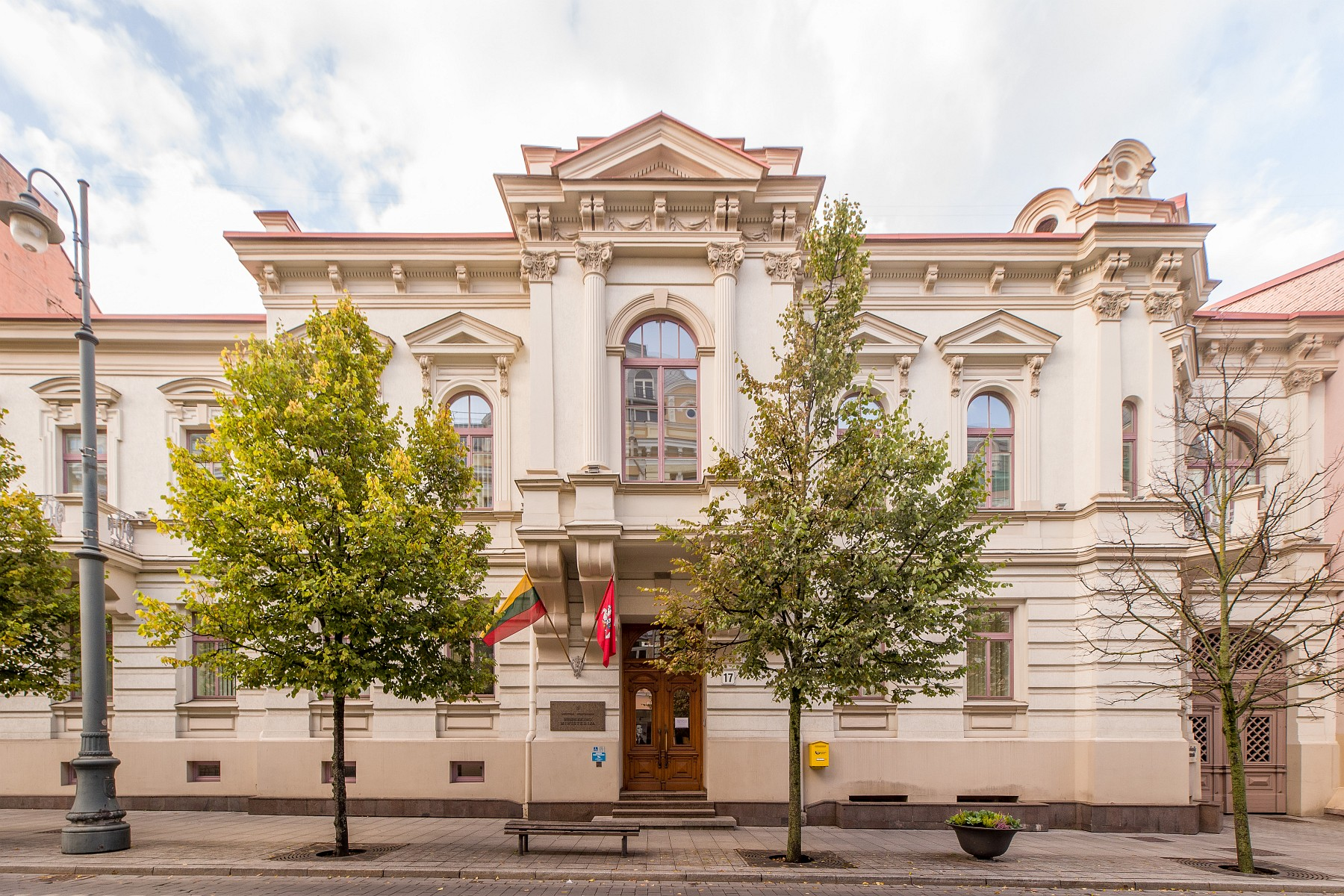

Ministry overview
- Formed: 19 November 1918; 107 years ago
- Jurisdiction: Government of Lithuania
- Headquarters: Gedimino 17, Naujamiestis, 01104 Vilnius
- Employees: 158 permanent employees (January 2021)
- Annual budget: ▲€1.245 billion (2024)
- Minister responsible: Juras Taminskas, 24th Minister for Transport and Communications of Lithuania
- Website: sumin.lrv.lt

Map
- 54°41′16.1″N 25°16′41.3″E

Ministry of Transport and Communications (Lithuanian: Lietuvos Respublikos susisiekimo ministerija) is a government institution in the Republic of Lithuania which coordinates the work of road, rail, air, water, transport, postal and electronic communications sector and implements the strategy and politics of state government.

== History ==
The Ministry of Transport and Communications of Lithuania was first established on 11 November 1918 and it operated until the World War II. The ministry was first temporarily headed by the then Minister of Finance Martynas Yčas (1885–1941). When Lithuania regained its independence the new Government was formed on 22 March 1990, and the Ministry of Transport and Communications was re-established as well. The objectives of the Ministry include the creation of new transport strategy and legal system as well as deepening the integration of the Lithuanian transport sector into the European transport network.

== Ministers ==
The Minister of Transport and Communications (Lithuanian: Susisiekimo ministras) is a member of the executive branch of the Government of Lithuania. The current incumbent is Juras Taminskas who took office on 25 September 2025.

The Minister of Transport and Communications of Lithuania is responsible for overseeing the development, maintenance, and efficiency of the country's transportation infrastructure, including roads, rail, air, and maritime systems. This role involves formulating policies that regulate transportation, enhance mobility, and promote environmental sustainability. The Minister also leads efforts to advance digital communication networks and telecommunications services, ensuring the country is equipped with modern and accessible digital infrastructure. Additionally, the Minister is tasked with ensuring the safety of transportation networks, implementing safety regulations, and responding to any transport-related incidents. The Minister represents Lithuania in international transport matters, fostering cooperation with other countries and organizations, and coordinates cross-border infrastructure projects. Furthermore, the Minister plays a key role in drafting legislation and regulations related to transport and communication sectors, aligning them with both national and European Union standards. Finally, the Minister supports initiatives aimed at improving public transportation and alternative mobility solutions, contributing to reduced congestion and increased accessibility.

Electoral Action of Poles in Lithuania Homeland Union Liberal Movement Liberal Union Social Democratic Party Independent

Ministry of Transport and Communications
Term	Minister	Party	Cabinet	Office		
Term	Minister	Party	Cabinet	Start date	End date	Time in office
1	Jonas Biržiškis (1932–2025)	Independent	Prunskienė	17 January 1990	10 January 1991	358 days
2	Jonas Biržiškis (1932–2025)	Independent	Šimėnas	10 January 1991	13 January 1991	3 days
3	Jonas Biržiškis (1932–2025)	Independent	Vagnorius	13 January 1991	21 July 1992	1 year, 190 days
4	Jonas Biržiškis (1932–2025)	Independent	Abišala	21 July 1992	17 December 1992	149 days
5	Jonas Biržiškis (1932–2025)	Independent	Lubys	17 December 1992	31 March 1993	104 days
6	Jonas Biržiškis (1932–2025)	Independent	Šleževičius	31 March 1993	19 March 1996	2 years, 354 days
7	Jonas Biržiškis (1932–2025)	Independent	Stankevičius	19 March 1996	10 December 1996	266 days
8	Algis Žvaliauskas (born 1955)	Homeland Union	Vagnorius	10 December 1996	25 November 1998	1 year, 350 days
9	Rimantas Didžiokas (born 1953)	Homeland Union	Vagnorius	6 January 1999	10 June 1999	155 days
10	Rimantas Didžiokas (born 1953)	Homeland Union	Paksas	10 June 1999	11 November 1999	154 days
11	Rimantas Didžiokas (born 1953)	Homeland Union	Kubilius	11 November 1999	9 November 2000	364 days
12	Gintaras Striaukas (born 1960)	Liberal Union	Paksas	9 November 2000	24 January 2001	76 days
13	Dailis Alfonsas Barakauskas (born 1952)	Liberal Union	Paksas	24 January 2001	12 July 2001	169 days
14	Zigmantas Balčytis (born 1953)	Social Democratic Party	Brazauskas	12 July 2001	14 December 2004	3 years, 155 days
15	Zigmantas Balčytis (born 1953)	Social Democratic Party	Brazauskas	14 December 2004	14 May 2005	151 days
16	Petras Čėsna (born 1945)	Social Democratic Party	Brazauskas	10 June 2005	18 July 2006	1 year, 38 days
17	Algirdas Butkevičius (born 1958)	Social Democratic Party	Kirkilas	18 July 2006	27 May 2008	1 year, 314 days
18	Eligijus Masiulis (born 1974)	Liberal Movement	Kubilius	9 December 2008	13 December 2012	4 years, 4 days
19	Rimantas Sinkevičius (born 1952)	Social Democratic Party	Butkevičius	13 December 2012	13 December 2016	4 years, 0 days
20	Rokas Masiulis (born 1969)	Independent	Skvernelis	13 December 2016	7 August 2019	2 years, 237 days
21	Jaroslav Narkevič (born 1962)	Electoral Action of Poles in Lithuania	Skvernelis	7 August 2019	11 December 2020	1 year, 126 days
22	Marius Skuodis (born 1985)	Independent	Šimonytė	11 December 2020	12 December 2024	4 years, 1 day
23	Eugenijus Sabutis (born 1975)	Social Democratic Party	Paluckas	12 December 2024	25 September 2025	287 days
24	Juras Taminskas (born 1986)	Social Democratic Party	Ruginienė	25 September 2025	Incumbent	318 days

== Role and responsibilities ==
The Ministry seeks:

- to fulfil the requirements of European Union legislation in the areas of transport, post and electronic communications;
- to modernize the transport infrastructure;
- to integrate the main highways of the country into the trans-European networks;
- to enable the development of transport business, transparent competition;
- to improve transport and communication service quality;
- to promote multimodal transport, logistics centers, public setting;
- to coordinate activities in the areas of transport, post and electronic communications;
- to take part in the development of the traffic safety policy for all modes of transport;
- to take part in the development of the policy on the reduction of negative environmental impacts of transport areas.

== The most important transport and communication infrastructure development projects ==
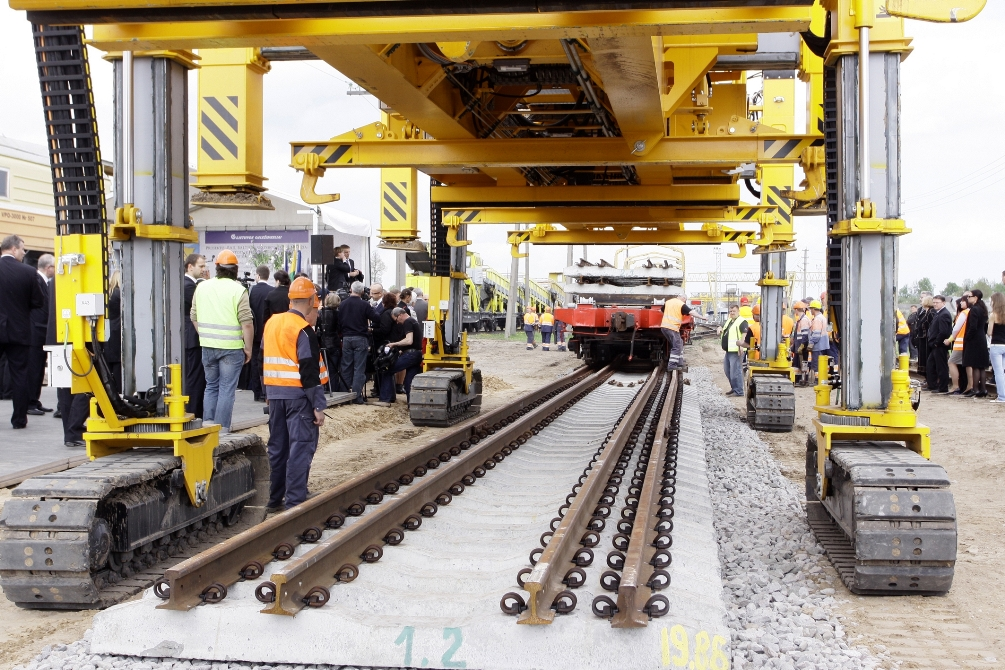
Construction of the first Rail Baltica rail. May 2010

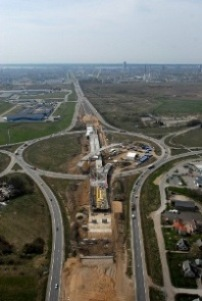
Reconstruction oj Jakai roundabout. Building process of the longest overhead road in Lithuania. 2010 April.

Rail Baltica is one of the priority projects of the European Union Trans-European Transport Networks (TEN-T).European gauge railway is going to link Helsinki and Tallinn, Riga, Kaunas and Warsaw. The project is funded by the European Union's TEN-T, the Cohesion Fund and the Lithuanian State, started in 2010.

Via Baltica is known as a part of the European route E67 between Warsaw and Tallinn. International Via Baltica project is helping to create better traffic conditions between the Central, Western Europe and Baltic countries.

RAIN – the project of developing the broadband Internet in all rural areas of the country. This project will be completed in 2013. The project goal is to provide broadband access to all rural districts of public administrations, hospitals, laboratories, schools, museums, libraries, public Internet access points.

MEZON 4G Internet, acting on the basis of advanced wireless technologies, providing extremely high speed (download speed - up to 10 Mbit/s). MEZON Internet operates in 53 cities and towns, it is available for about 60 percent of Lithuania's population. It is planned next year to allow MEZON mobile Internet access across the densely populated territory of Lithuania.

Dredging of Klaipėda state sea port basin, construction and reconstruction of embankments (2004–2010), improving facilities of freight and passenger service.

Reconstruction of Sventoji Port. Started in 2010. The port is going to maintain recreational, small, sport, fishing boats, small sea cruise and passenger ships.

Construction of deep-water port in Klaipėda (planned).

Reconstruction of Jakai roundabout (2010, completed the first stage of reconstruction). 4-lane overhead road is linking Kaunas and Klaipėda directions.

Reconstruction of Railway tunnel in Kaunas (2008)

Modernization of Kena border railway statio (2008)

== Institutions under the Ministry of Transport and Communications ==
- State Road Transport Inspectorate
- State Railway Inspectorate
- Lithuanian Road Administration
- Directorate of border crossing infrastructure
- Information Society Development Committee

== Institutions and Enterprises under the regulation of the Ministry ==
- Vilnius International Airport
- Kaunas Airport
- Palanga International Airport
- SE Air Navigation
- SE Inland Waterways Authority
- Klaipėda State Seaport
- SE Railway Design
- PC Aukštaitijos siaurasis geležinkelis
- SC Problematika
- SE Transport and Road Research Institute
- SC Lithuanian Post
- The State of inland navigation office
- Transport Investment Directorate
- PI "Plačiajuostis internetas"
- Civil Aviation Administration
- The Lithuanian Maritime Safety Administration
- AB "Lithuanian Railways"
- JSC "Geležinkelio apsaugos želdiniai"
- JSC "Smiltynės perkėla"
- JSC "Detonas"
- SE Lithuanian Radio and Television Centre
- JSC "Lithuanian Shipping Company"
