= Eugenijus Sabutis =

Lithuanian politician (born 1975)

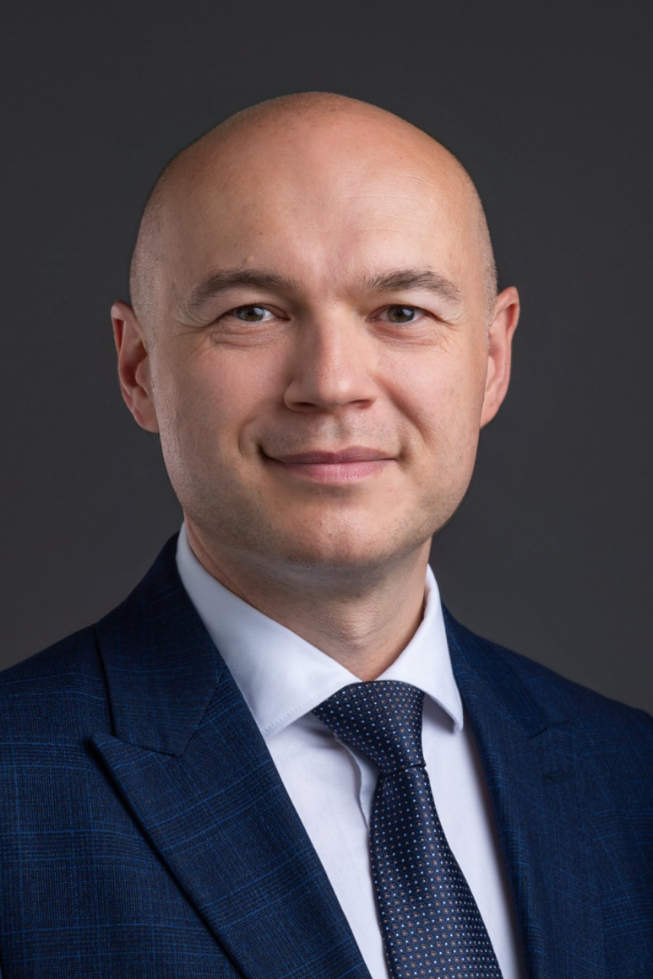

Minister of Transport and Communications
- In office 12 December 2024 – 25 September 2025
- Prime Minister: Rimantas Šadžius (acting)
- Preceded by: Marius Skuodis
- Succeeded by: Juras Taminskas

Mayor of Jonava district
- In office 13 December 2016 – 11 April 2019
- Preceded by: Mindaugas Sinkevičius
- Succeeded by: Mindaugas Sinkevičius

Vice-Mayor of Jonava district
- In office 9 April 2015 – 13 December 2016
- Preceded by: Remigijus Osauskas

Member of the Seimas
- Incumbent
- Assumed office 13 November 2020
- Preceded by: Rimantas Sinkevičius
- Constituency: Jonava

Personal details
- Born: 10 September 1975 (age 51) Jonava, Lithuanian SSR, Soviet Union
- Party: Social Democratic Party of Lithuania
- Spouse: Rasa
- Children: Son
- Education: Vytautas Magnus University, Law Faculty
- Occupation: Politician
- Profession: Lawyer
- Cabinet: Paluckas Cabinet

Eugenijus Sabutis (born 10 September 1975 in Jonava) is a Lithuanian politician and since 2016 Mayor of Jonava. Minister of Transport and Communications since 12 December 2024.

Eugenijus Sabutis was appointed Minister of Transport and Communications in December 2024. During his term, he has focused on reshaping national infrastructure priorities amid fiscal pressures.

== Biography ==
Eugenijus Sabutis graduated from Jonava Gymnasium in 1994 and then graduated from Vytautas Magnus University.

Sabutis was active in the Social Democratic Young Organization. A member of the Social Democratic Party of Lithuania, he was elected to the municipal council of Jonava district municipality in 2015. In 2015, he became a vice-mayor of Jonava district municipality through the municipal council. At the end of 2016, former mayor Mindaugas Sinkevičius was appointed the Minister of Economy on Skvernelis Cabinet, the 17th cabinet of the Republic of Lithuania. Since December 2016 he is head of the Jonava district municipality.

== Family ==
Sabutis is married and has a son.

Seimas
Preceded by Rimantas Sinkevičius	Member of the Seimas for Jonava; 2020–present	Incumbent
