= Dalia Kreivienė =

Lithuanian diplomat (born 1972)

Lithuanian Ambassador to Italy, Malta and San Marino
- Incumbent
- Assumed office 10 October 2022
- Prime Minister: Saulius Skvernelis; Ingrida Šimonytė; Gintautas Paluckas
- Preceded by: Ričardas Šlepavičius

Personal details
- Born: 24 February 1972 (age 54) Lithuania
- Spouse: Dainius Kreivys
- Children: 2
- Education: Vilnius University; Jean Moulin University Lyon 3

Dalia Kreivienė (born 24 February 1972) is a Lithuanian diplomat. She has served as Deputy head of the Lithuanian Embassy in France. Since 2022, she has served as Lithuanian Ambassador to Italy, Malta and San Marino.

== Career ==
Kreivienė was born on 24 February 1972. She is polylingual and speaks English, French, Italian and Russian.

Kreivienė studied a Bachelors degree in Finance, Business Administration and Management at Vilnius University, studying at the Jean Moulin University Lyon 3 in Paris, France, for a year on an Erasmus Programme. She studied a Masters degree in Master in Business Administration and Management at Vilnius University. She later studied Business Administration at the Baltic Management Institute (BMI).

After graduating in 1997, Kreivienė began her diplomatic career in 1998.

From 2019, Kreivienė was the Director of the Department of External Economic Relations and Economic Security Policy at the Lithuanian Ministry of Foreign Affairs (MFA).

On 10 October 2022, Kreivienė was appointed as Lithuanian Ambassador to Italy, Malta and San Marino and as Permanent Representative of Lithuania to the Food and Agriculture Organization of the United Nations. She was nominated by the cabinet, of which her husband was a member, which raised concerns about a potential conflict of interest. The concerns were dismissed and her nomination was publicly supported by the President Gitanas Nausėda, as well as Prime Minister Ingrida Šimonytė.

In post, Kreivienė has worked on cooperation between Lithuania and Italy in the cultural, tourism and transport fields. In 2024, she represented Lithuania at the 75th International Astronautical Congress (IAC) in Milan. In 2025, she celebrated the launch of Ryanair’s summer flight route from Pescara in Abruzzo, Italy, to Kaunas in Lithuania and spoke at a panel event titled "Lithuania and Europe: Past, Present and Future" at the Guarini Institute for Public Affairs, John Cabot University in Rome. She has also visited institutions including the Port System Authority of the Central Adriatic Sea, the NATO Rapid Deployable Corps Italy (NRDC-ITA) Headquarters and the National Cancer Institute.

== Personal life ==
Kreivienė is married to Dainius Kreivys, a Lithuanian politician with the Homeland Union party and the Lithuanian Minister of Energy in the Šimonytė Cabinet (2020–2024). The couple have a son, Daumantas, and a daughter, Gabrielė Marija.

Kreivienė and her husband were ranked as 4th and 5th wealthiest politicians and public servants in 2020.
