= Ministry of Energy (Lithuania) =

Government ministry of Lithuania

- Energetikos ministerija (in Lithuanian)

- Ministry's headquarters on Gedimino Avenue

Ministry overview
- Formed: 17 January 1990; 36 years ago
- Jurisdiction: Government of Lithuania
- Headquarters: Gedimino ave 38, Senamiestis, 01104 Vilnius
- Employees: 90 permanent employees (January 2021)
- Annual budget: ▲€467 million (2024)
- Minister responsible: Žygimantas Vaičiūnas, 12th Minister for Energy of Lithuania
- Website: enmin.lrv.lt

Map
- 54°41′17.5″N 25°16′20.5″E

The Ministry of Energy of the Republic of Lithuania (Lithuanian: Lietuvos Respublikos energetikos ministerija) is a government department of the Republic of Lithuania. Its operations are authorized by the Constitution of the Republic of Lithuania, decrees issued by the President and Prime Minister, and laws passed by the Seimas (Parliament). Its mission is to prosecute Lithuanian government policy in fuel, electricity, thermo-energy production and supply for Lithuania's economy. The current head of the Ministry is Dainius Kreivys.

== History ==
The Ministry of Energy was initially established on 17 January 1990 and its first minister was Leonas Vaidotas Ašmantas. In 1997 it was merged into the Ministry of Economy, but on 27 January 2009 it was restored as a separate ministry.

== Ministers ==
Homeland Union Independent

Ministry of Energy
Term	Minister	Party	Cabinet	Office		
Term	Minister	Party	Cabinet	Start date	End date	Time in office
1	Leonas Ašmantas (born 1939)	Independent	Prunskienė	17 January 1990	10 January 1991	358 days
2	Leonas Ašmantas (born 1939)	Independent	Šimėnas	10 January 1991	13 January 1991	3 days
3	Leonas Ašmantas (born 1939)	Independent	Vagnorius	13 January 1991	21 July 1992	1 year, 190 days
4	Leonas Ašmantas (born 1939)	Independent	Abišala	21 July 1992	17 December 1992	149 days
5	Leonas Ašmantas (born 1939)	Independent	Lubys	17 December 1992	31 March 1993	104 days
6	Leonas Ašmantas (born 1944)	Independent	Šleževičius	31 March 1993	15 May 1995	2 years, 45 days
7	Arvydas Leščinskas (born 1946)	Independent	Šleževičius	15 May 1995	19 March 1996	309 days
8	Saulius Kutas (born 1935)	Independent	Stankevičius	19 March 1996	10 December 1996	266 days
Part of Ministry of Economy from 10 December 1996 to 9 December 2008
Ministry of Energy
Term	Minister	Party	Cabinet	Office		
Term	Minister	Party	Cabinet	Start date	End date	Time in office
9	Arvydas Sekmokas (born 1967)	Independent	Kubilius	9 December 2008	13 December 2012	4 years, 4 days
10	Jaroslav Neverovič (born 1976)	Independent	Butkevičius	13 December 2012	25 August 2014	1 year, 255 days
11	Rokas Masiulis (born 1969)	Independent	Butkevičius	25 September 2014	13 December 2016	2 years, 79 days
12	Žygimantas Vaičiūnas (born 1975)	Independent	Skvernelis	13 December 2016	11 December 2020	3 years, 364 days
13	Dainius Kreivys (born 1970)	Homeland Union	Šimonytė	11 December 2020	12 December 2024	4 years, 1 day
(12)	Žygimantas Vaičiūnas (born 1975)	DSVL (2024–2025)	Paluckas	12 December 2024	Incumbent	1 year, 239 days
(12)	Žygimantas Vaičiūnas (born 1975)	Independent	Ruginienė	12 December 2024	Incumbent	1 year, 239 days
