= Pašilaičiai =

- Eldership
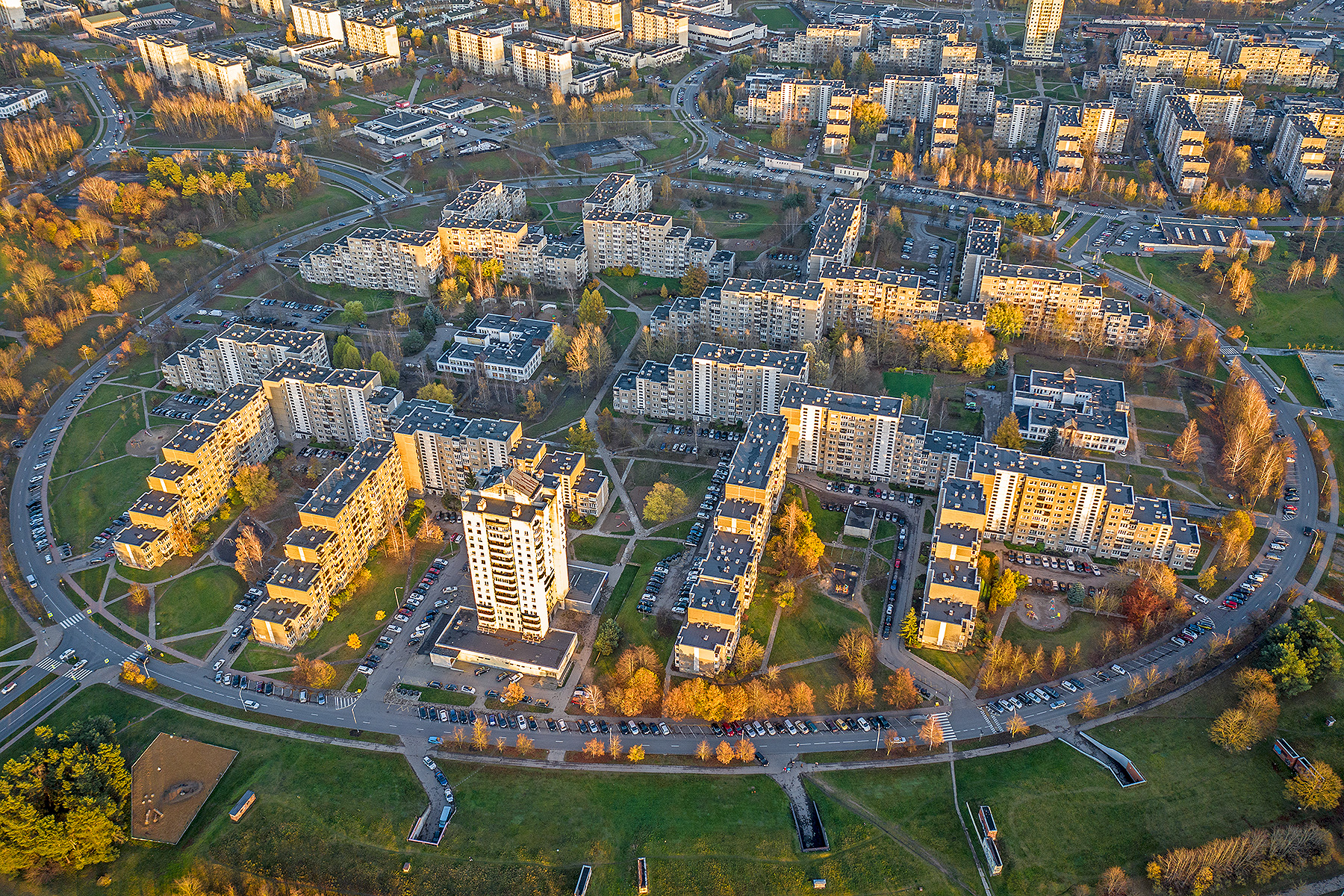

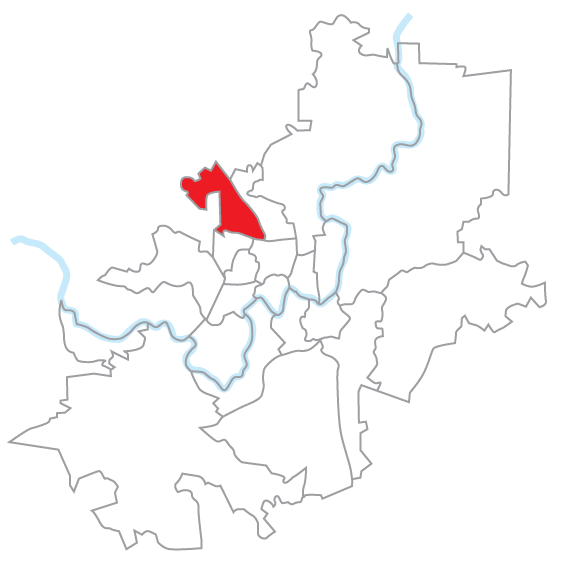

- Location of Pašilaičiai
- Country: Lithuania
- County: Vilnius County
- Municipality: Vilnius City Municipality
- Elder: Ramunė Poliakovienė

Area
  - Total: 8.09 km^{2} (3.12 sq mi)
  - Rank: 10th in (Vilnius)

Population (2023 December)
  - Total: 44,298
  - Density: 5,475.65/km^{2} (14,181.9/sq mi)
- Time zone: UTC+2 (EET)
  - Summer (DST): UTC+3 (EEST)
- Website: vilnius.lt

Pašilaičiai is an eldership in Vilnius, Lithuania. It occupies 8.09 km^{2} (3.12 sq mi). According to the 2011 census, it had a population of 33,056.

== Demographics ==
The district is one of the fastest-growing in the entire city. It is estimated that in the last 20 years, the population of the district has increased by more than 72 percent. In 2001, the population of Pašilaičiai was 25,674, with an increase to 33,056 in 2011 and 40,384 in 2021.

As of 2023, the Pašilaičiai eldership is predominantly populated by Lithuanians, Belarusians, Russians, and Ukrainians, where Lithuanians making 5/6 of the entire population.

Population of Pašilaičiai Eldership as of 2023
Rank	Nationality	Population	
1.	Lithuania	38,926	87.87%
2.	Belarus	2,068	4.69%
3.	Russia	1,173	2.64%
4.	Ukraine	843	1.90%
5.	United Kingdom	172	0.39%
6.	Others	1,116	2.51%
