= Kurk Lietuvai =

Lithuanian government programme

- Create Lithuania (English)

- Headquarters in Vilnius, Lithuania, 2023

Government agency overview
- Formed: 2012; 14 years ago
- Jurisdiction: Lithuania
- Headquarters: Vilnius, Lithuania.
- Employees: 20
- Parent department: Invest Lithuania
- Website: kurklt.lt
- Agency ID: 124013427 same as parent department

Map
- 54°41′43″N 25°15′33″E

Kurk Lietuvai (in English: Create Lithuania), also known as KurkLT, is a strategic government initiative focused on fostering innovation and implementing best practices within the Lithuanian public sector. It is part of Invest Lithuania, country's foreign investment agency.

This is the only program of its kind in Lithuania with few equivalents abroad. Multiple Lithuanian politicians have praised it for effectiveness and results. UN and UNESCO reports have identified Create Lithuania as a good example for other countries to follow.

== History ==
The program was created in 2012 as an attempt to establish a mechanism of innovation in Lithuanian public sector. In the early years of the program, it was co-financed by European Union. The program initially targeted young Lithuanian professionals with considerable foreign experience and attempted to attract them to Lithuania. Many participants have been educated at primarily foreign universities, e.g. Cambridge, Oxford, Maastricht and others.

=== Past projects ===
During the first 6 years of its existence, the program successfully implemented 180 projects. During the first decade – about 300. Since 2022, multiple projects were aimed at improving conditions for Ukrainian refugees and rebuilding Ukraine post-war. Create Lithuania has contributed to the creation of Lithuanian deposit-refund system, which became one of the most successful in Europe with higher than 90% return rate. Lithuanian Startup Visa system was co-created by Create Lithuania and launched in 2017. In 2019, 62 startups applied to relocate to Lithuania on Startup Visa, 18 of which were approved. In its projects, Create Lithuania has also partnered with private companies, e.g. Google and Oxylabs.

Create Lithuania reports have been frequently featured as sources in a variety of government documents, scholarly papers and PhD dissertations. As of 2024, the program has received multiple awards, including Innovation in Politics Award and Reves Excellence. Multiple other projects have been nominated for Innovation in Politics awards. KurkLT projects have also won Project Management Institute awards for Lithuania's best public sector initiatives.

== Structure ==
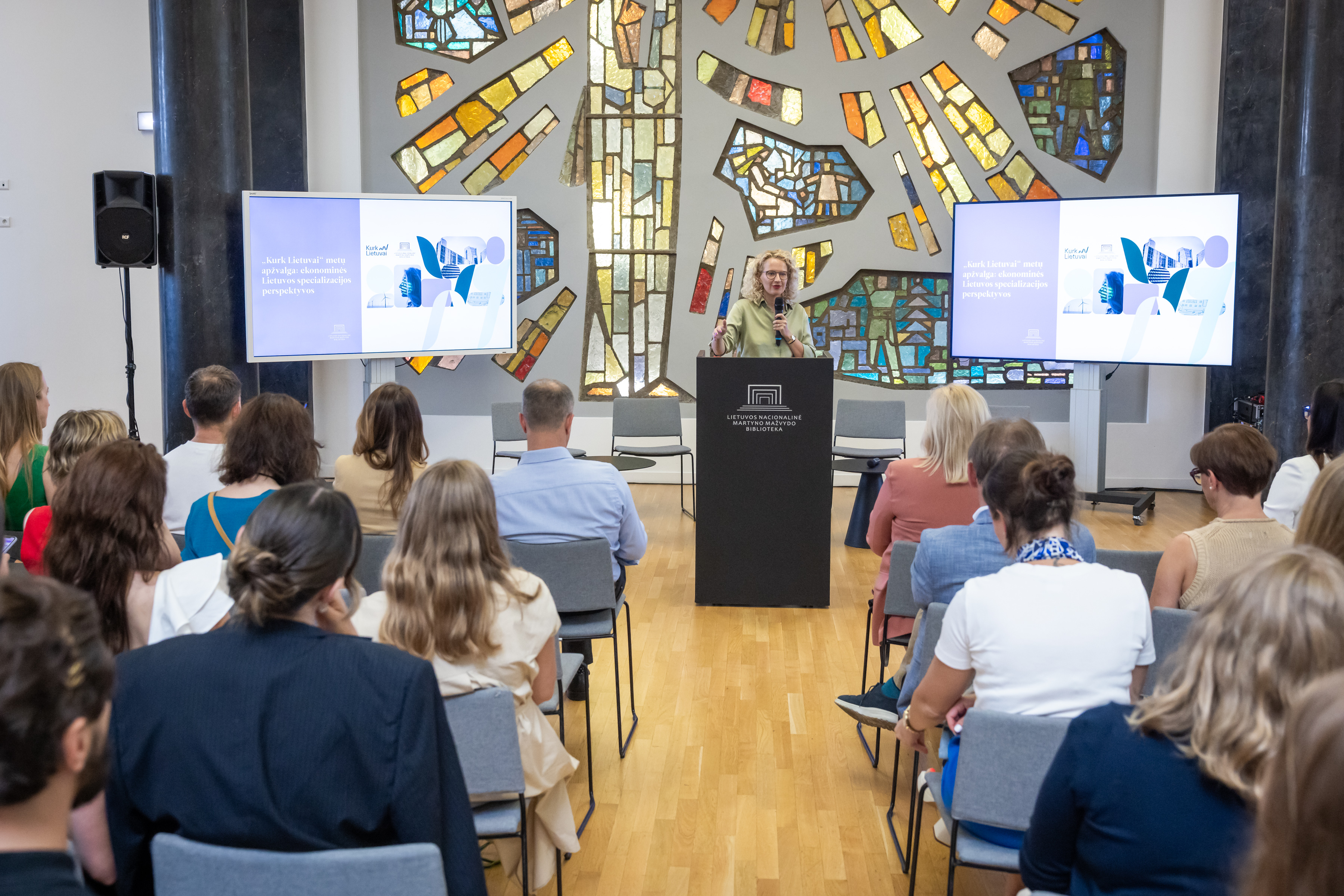
Aušrinė Armonaitė during result presentation event 2024

Every year, the program selects about 20 participants for an annual work contracts that begin in September. The program targets Lithuanian diaspora and Lithuanians with extensive experience abroad, but is open to everyone. Lithuanian Ministry of Foreign Affairs and Lithuanian embassies assist in recruiting the candidates. Create Lithuania has had Lithuanians from all continents, also from countries not well known for Lithuanian diaspora like New Zealand, Mexico, China or Kenya.

The program consists of two 6 month long projects in the Lithuanian public sector and its ministries and organizations. The projects are typically tailored to candidate's education, skills and interests. Therefore, there is a lot of variation in project areas – education, immigration, gender equality, finance, defense, business environment, city planning etc.

In the past, KurkLT projects and their results have been presented to Lithuanian ministers, prime minister, presidents, Government Chancellor and various heads of government institutions.

== Former participants ==
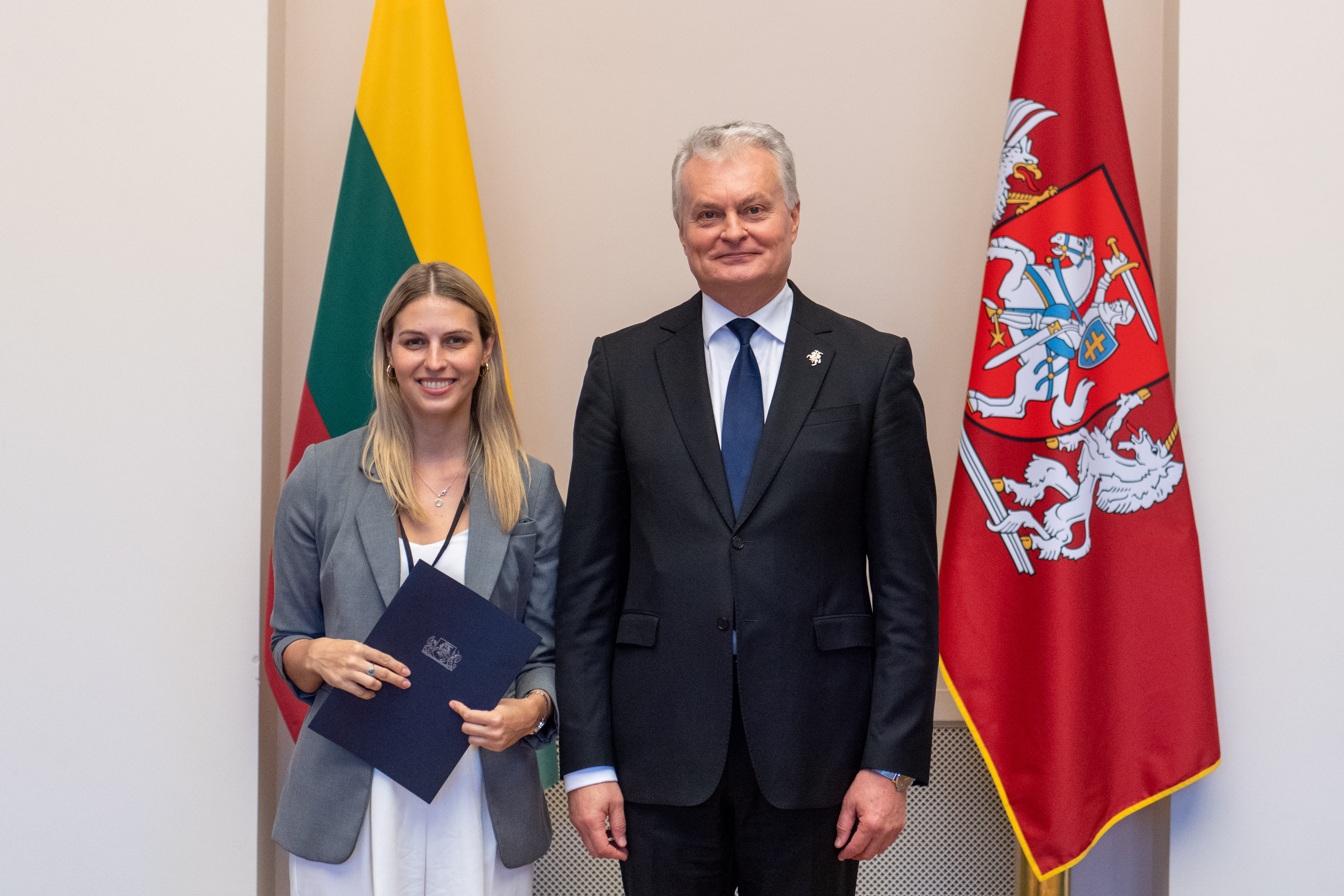
Kurk Lietuvai participant Eglė with Lithuania's president Gitanas Nausėda

Majority of former participants moved to Lithuania for the program and about 80% of them stay in Lithuania long-term. After the program, many take jobs in the public sector and former participants include multiple current or former deputy ministers, ministers, deputy mayors, heads of governmental institutions, presidential advisers, multiple advisers to the prime minister, members of Parliament and European commissioner. Notable former participants include MP Lukas Savickas, author Unė Kaunaitė and European Commissioner Virginijus Sinkevičius.

Other past participants went to the private sector, e.g. Google, Goodwin Procter, SEB Group and others. Several former members have received national order for merit awards. The program has an active alumni network for former members. Alumni Network is active in Lithuanian society and has done projects with Rotary, Jaunimo linija, Lithuanian Food bank and others.

== See also ==
- The Innovation in Politics Institute
