= Vilnius College =

Lithuanian state institution of higher education

Coordinates: 54°41′46″N 25°15′25″E

- Vilniaus kolegija
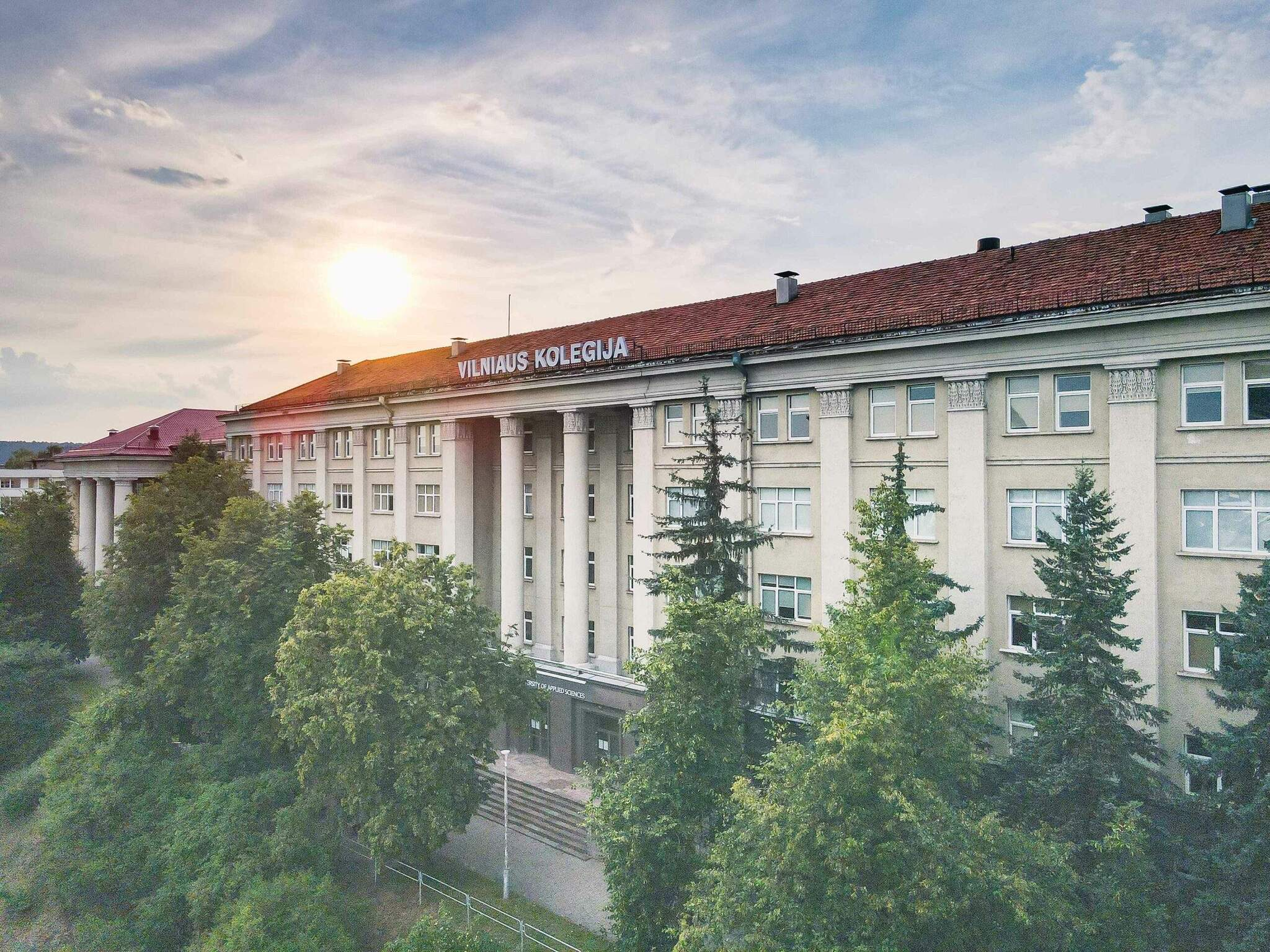
- VIKO Agrotechnologies, Economics and Pedagogy faculties
- Type: Public
- Established: 2000
- Rector: Žymantė Jankauskienė
- Students: ~ 6500
- Location: Vilnius, Lithuania
- Website: www.viko.lt
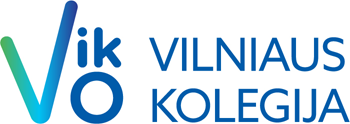

Vilnius College (Lithuanian: Vilniaus kolegija or VIKO) is a public education institution providing non-university higher education located in Vilnius, Lithuania. It was established on 1 September 2000 (25 years ago) upon reorganizing three higher schools in Vilnius: Schools of Electronics, Economics and Commerce. It is the largest higher education institution in Lithuania, hosting about 6500 students and about 560 teaching staff (according to October 2025 data). Vilnius College is the best rated vocational higher education institution in Lithuania.

== Study programs ==
Vilnius College is a public higher education institution consisting of 9 faculties, offering study programs in the informatics, engineering, physical sciences, technology, health sciences, veterinary medicine, agriculture, social science, business and public administration, education, humanities and the arts. Vilnius College offers more than 50 study programs. After successful completion of studies graduates are awarded the professional bachelor's degree.
