= P&G Alumni =

Organization for former Procter & Gamble employees

The P&G Alumni Network is a nonprofit organization founded by alumni to help former P&G employees stay connected. The network includes 50,000 former P&G employees and is one of the founding corporate alumni networks that later became commonplace.

The P&G Alumni Network is not formally connected with P&G, but the company provides support, financial assistance and allows the use of the P&G name.

In November 2018, P&G Alumni entered into a formal agreement with SAP & EnterpriseAlumni for the delivery of a new enterprise platform to manage the global community.

== Annual event ==
Since 2003, the P&G Alumni Network has held a Global Conference every 2 years.

- 2003 – Cincinnati
- 2005 – London, Great Britain
- 2007 – Cincinnati (hosted by the NYC chapter)
- 2009 – Rome, Italy (hosted by the Italy chapter)
- 2011 – Toronto, Canada (hosted by the Canada chapter)
- 2013 – Geneva, Switzerland (hosted by the Geneva chapter)
- 2015 – Miami, Florida (hosted by Miami Chapter)
- 2017 – Cincinnati, October 9–13, 3 day conference including guest speakers Meg Whitman, Scott Cook, Jim McNerney

== P&G Alumni Foundation ==
The P&G Alumni Foundation is the charitable arm of the P&G Alumni Network. It partners with charitable organizations that are meaningfully and actively supported by P&G Alumni. Annual fund raising efforts and donations are distributed by the Foundation, P&G Alumni must be actively and meaningfully involved with the charitable organization receiving a grant request.

In 2017 $175,000 was awarded to 9 grant recipients from seven countries across four continents.

== Founding ==
The P&G Alumni Network was founded in 2001 by Ed Tazzia.
