= Virginijus Sinkevičius =

Lithuanian economist

Virginijus Sinkevičius MEP
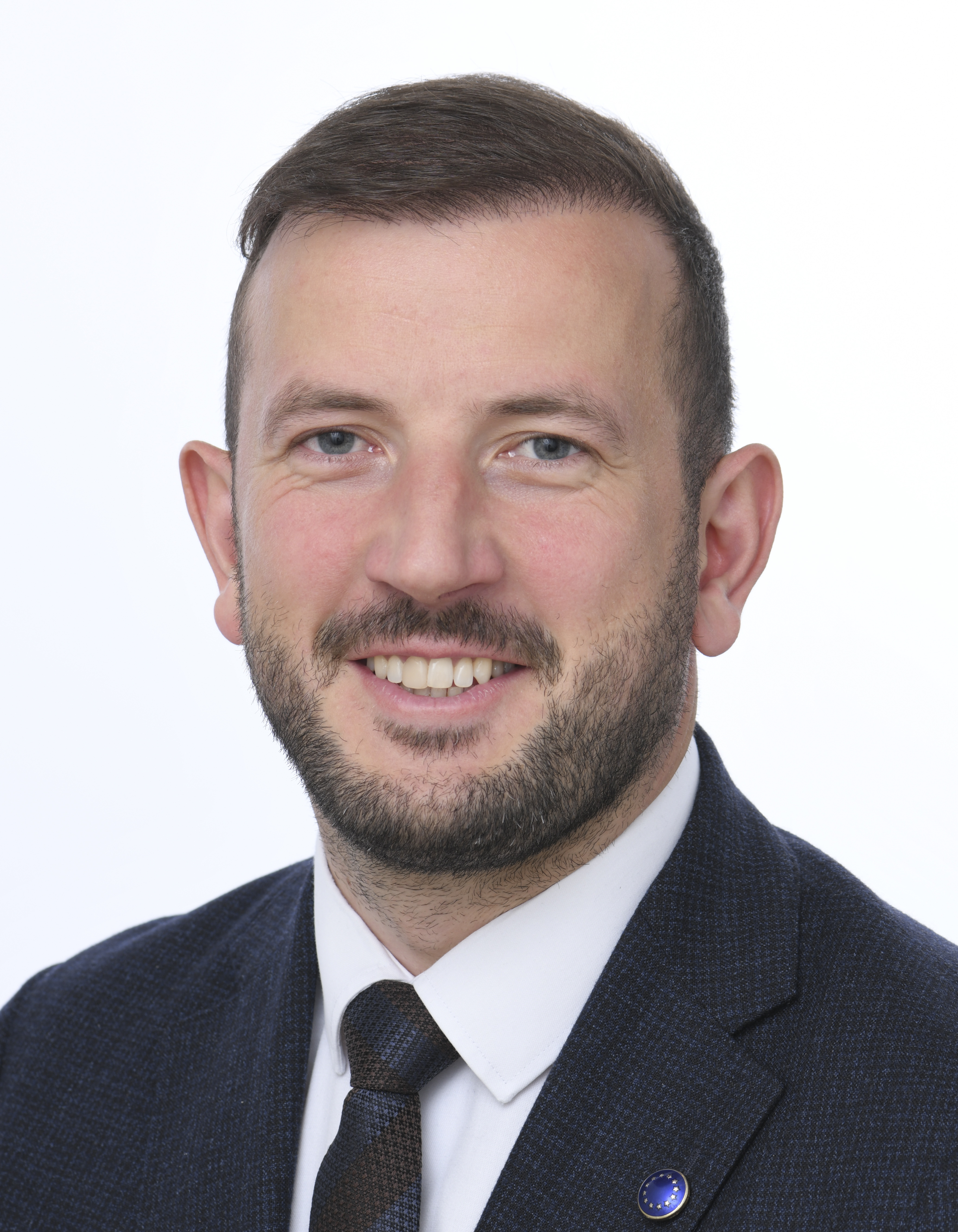
- Official portrait, 2024

Member of the European Parliament
- Incumbent
- Assumed office 16 July 2024
- Constituency: Lithuania

European Commissioner for the Environment, Oceans and Fisheries
- In office 1 December 2019 – 16 July 2024
- Commission: Von der Leyen I
- Preceded by: Karmenu Vella
- Succeeded by: Maroš Šefčovič (ad interim)

Minister of Economy and Innovation
- In office 27 November 2017 – 30 November 2019
- Prime Minister: Saulius Skvernelis
- Preceded by: Mindaugas Sinkevičius
- Succeeded by: Žygimantas Vaičiūnas (acting); Rimantas Sinkevičius

Member of the Seimas
- In office 14 November 2016 – 28 November 2019
- Preceded by: Audronius Ažubalis
- Succeeded by: Mindaugas Lingė (2020)
- Constituency: Šeškinė

Personal details
- Born: 4 November 1990 (age 35) Vilnius, Lithuania
- Party: Union of Democrats "For Lithuania"
- Education: Aberystwyth University; Maastricht University
- Virginijus Sinkevičius's voice Sinkevičius discussing the reconstruction of Ukraine's economy following the Russian invasion of Ukraine; Recorded 30 November 2023

Virginijus Sinkevičius (born 4 November 1990) is a Lithuanian politician who served as European Commissioner for the Environment, Oceans and Fisheries in the first von der Leyen Commission from 2019 to 2024. In the 2024 European elections he was elected and became a member of the European Parliament. He was previously a Member of the Seimas and Minister of Economy and Innovation.

== Early life and education ==
In 2009, Sinkevičius graduated from Salomėja Nėris Gymnasium of Vilnius, Lithuania, where he was born. He then pursued his undergraduate studies in Aberystwyth University from where he received a Bachelor of Economic and Social Studies degree in 2012.

In 2012, Sinkevičius was a trainee in the Unit of Regional and Ethnic Affairs at the Office of the Prime Minister of the Republic of Lithuania. In 2013, he received a Master of Arts in European Studies from Maastricht University.

In 2017, Sinkevičius completed Digital Policy course in University of Oxford.

Sinkevičius speaks Lithuanian as mother tongue, as well as English, Russian and Polish.

== Early career ==
Between 2012 and 2015, Sinkevičius contributed as an author and editor to the Lithuania Tribune, a news portal focused on Lithuanian and European affairs. In 2013–2014, he gained international experience as an Assistant Project Manager at the Center for European Policy Analysis (CEPA) in Washington, D.C., where he worked on transatlantic policy initiatives.

In 2014, Sinkevičius returned to Lithuania to serve as an International Project Manager at Lietuvos paštas, coordinating cross-border projects aimed at modernizing postal services. From 2014 to 2015, he participated in the government’s “Create Lithuania” program, an initiative designed to attract young professionals to contribute innovative ideas to public sector development.

In 2015–2016, he coordinated the Lithuanian Airports concession project (LTOU), focusing on strategic partnerships and investment frameworks. The following year, he led the Group for Improving the Investment Environment at the public agency Invest Lithuania, where he was responsible for developing policies to enhance Lithuania’s attractiveness to foreign investors.

== Political career ==
=== Career in national politics ===
In the 2016 parliamentary elections, Sinkevičius was elected to the Seimas as an independent candidate representing the Šeškinė constituency in Vilnius. During his term, he was appointed Chair of the Committee on Economic Affairs, where he focused on fostering innovation and improving Lithuania’s business environment.

On 27 November 2017, Sinkevičius was appointed Minister of Economy in the cabinet of Prime Minister Saulius Skvernelis. Following the reorganization of the ministry, he assumed the role of Minister of the Economy and Innovation, overseeing national strategies for economic growth, digital transformation, and technological development.

=== Member of the European Commission, 2019–2024 ===
On 22 August 2019, the Lithuanian parliament approved Sinkevičius’ nomination for European commissioner; the nomination was agreed upon by Prime Minister Skvernelis and Ramūnas Karbauskis, the leader of the Lithuanian Farmers and Greens Union (LVŽS).

Upon taking office, Sinkevičius became the youngest-ever European Commissioner, at the age of 28.

In 2022, Sinkevičius proposed legally binding targets to halve the use of chemical pesticides and restore nature across the EU to at least 20% of EU land by 2030, in an attempt to better protect health and recover plunging wildlife populations.

=== Member of the European Parliament, 2024–present ===
In the 2024 European Parliament election, Sinkevičius was elected to the European Parliament. In order to fulfill his mandate, he resigned from his position as EU Commissioner on 16 July 2024. His duties as Commissioner was temporarily taken over by Executive Vice-President Maroš Šefčovič.

In the European Parliament Sinkevičius is serving as deputy chair of the Greens–European Free Alliance (Greens/EFA) group, under the leadership of co-chairs Terry Reintke and Bas Eickhout.

Sinkevičius ran in the 2024 Lithuanian parliamentary election as a member of Saulius Skvernelis's party Union of Democrats "For Lithuania" (DSVL), winning a Seimas seat in the multi-member constituency through his position in the party list. However, before the first meeting of the Fourteenth Seimas, Sinkevičius resigned his seat, opting to remain in Brussels. He attributed his decision to "differing visions" of the ruling coalition, referring to the decision of the Social Democrats and DSVL to ally with the controversial Dawn of Nemunas party, whose leader had been investigated for antisemitism. By contrast, Skvernelis claimed that Sinkevičius gave up his seat because the Foreign Minister position had not been assigned to DSVL. Rūta Miliūtė, the next candidate in the DSVL party list, took over his seat.

== Recognition ==
In 2018, Sinkevičius was awarded for The Best Solution for Better Business Environment of the Year by the association Investors’ Forum, and Blockchain Leadership at #SWITCH! Tech Awards. In 2019, he received the Partnership Leader 2018 award for innovation reform and development of startup ecosystem from the organisation Lithuanian Business Confederation. In 2018, Sinkevičius was included in the list of 100 World’s Most Influential Young People in Government by the website Apolitical.

Political offices
Preceded by Vytenis Andriukaitis	Lithuanian European Commissioner; 2019–present	Incumbent
