= Corporate alumni =

Former company employee

Corporate alumni are former employees of an organization. The term "corporate" is prefaced to recognize the difference from "alumni" who are graduates or former students of universities, colleges or schools.

Corporate alumni programs are commonplace among larger organizations in niche labor fields with a primary focus on boomerang hires.

Fostering of corporate alumni was recognized as an organizational value by Reid Hoffman, founder of LinkedIn, in his book The Alliance. In 2018 Deloitte recognized in their annual business transformation report that "the employee experience doesn't end at the exit interview".

Examples of corporations with corporate alumni programs include: P&G, HSBC, Nestle, Accenture, McKinsey and Pearson, and professional services organizations such as McKinsey & Company are often cited in the news for their prominent alumni who include CEOs of organizations including Google, Morgan Stanley, Boeing and others.
