= Rimantas Sinkevičius =

Lithuanian politician

Minister of Economy and Innovation
- In office 30 June 2020 – 11 December 2020
- President: Gitanas Nausėda
- Prime Minister: Saulius Skvernelis
- Preceded by: Virginijus Sinkevičius
- Succeeded by: Aušrinė Armonaitė

Minister of Transport and Communications
- In office 13 December 2012 – 13 December 2016
- President: Dalia Grybauskaitė
- Prime Minister: Algirdas Butkevičius
- Preceded by: Eligijus Masiulis
- Succeeded by: Rokas Masiulis

Personal details
- Born: 3 April 1952 (age 74) Anykščiai, Lithuanian SSR, USSR
- Party: Communist Party of Lithuania (1975-1989); Democratic Labour Party of Lithuania (1990-2001); Social Democratic Labour Party (since 2018); Social Democratic Party
- Spouse: Ligita Sinkevičienė
- Children: 2, including Mindaugas
- Education: Kaunas Institute of Polytechnics
- Occupation: Politician; engineer
- Website: www.r.sinkevicius.lt

Rimantas Sinkevičius (born 3 April 1952) is a Lithuanian politician, Minister of Economy and Innovation (2020), former Minister of Transport and Communications of Lithuania.

== Biography ==
In 1970 Sinkevičius graduated from Kavarskas high school and entered the Institute of polytechnics in Kaunas, faculty of Chemical technology, which he graduated in 1975 and acquired the specialty of inorganic fertilizers and chemical technology engineer. From 1975 to the end of 1979, he was an employee of the Kaunas City Committee of the Leninist Young Communist League of Lithuania, head of one of the departments.

From 1980 to 2000, Sinkevičius worked at the company Achema in Jonava (formerly state-owned company "Azotas"). He held various positions there: 1980–1983 - shift supervisor, 1983–1993 – foreman and chief of laboratory, 1993 to 1997 - Deputy Director of the center for Innovation and progress, 1997–2000- Deputy Director for Commerce, Head of marketing department. From 2004 to 2008 he was a development director of Achema Group.

From 2000 to 2004 Sinkevičius was a member of the 8th Parliament of the Republic of Lithuania, elected in constituency of Jonava No. 60. On 13 December 2012 he became Minister of Transport and Communications at the Republic of Lithuania.

Sinkevičius is a member of Council in the Lithuanian Social Democrats Party, a chairperson of Jonava division.

== Family ==
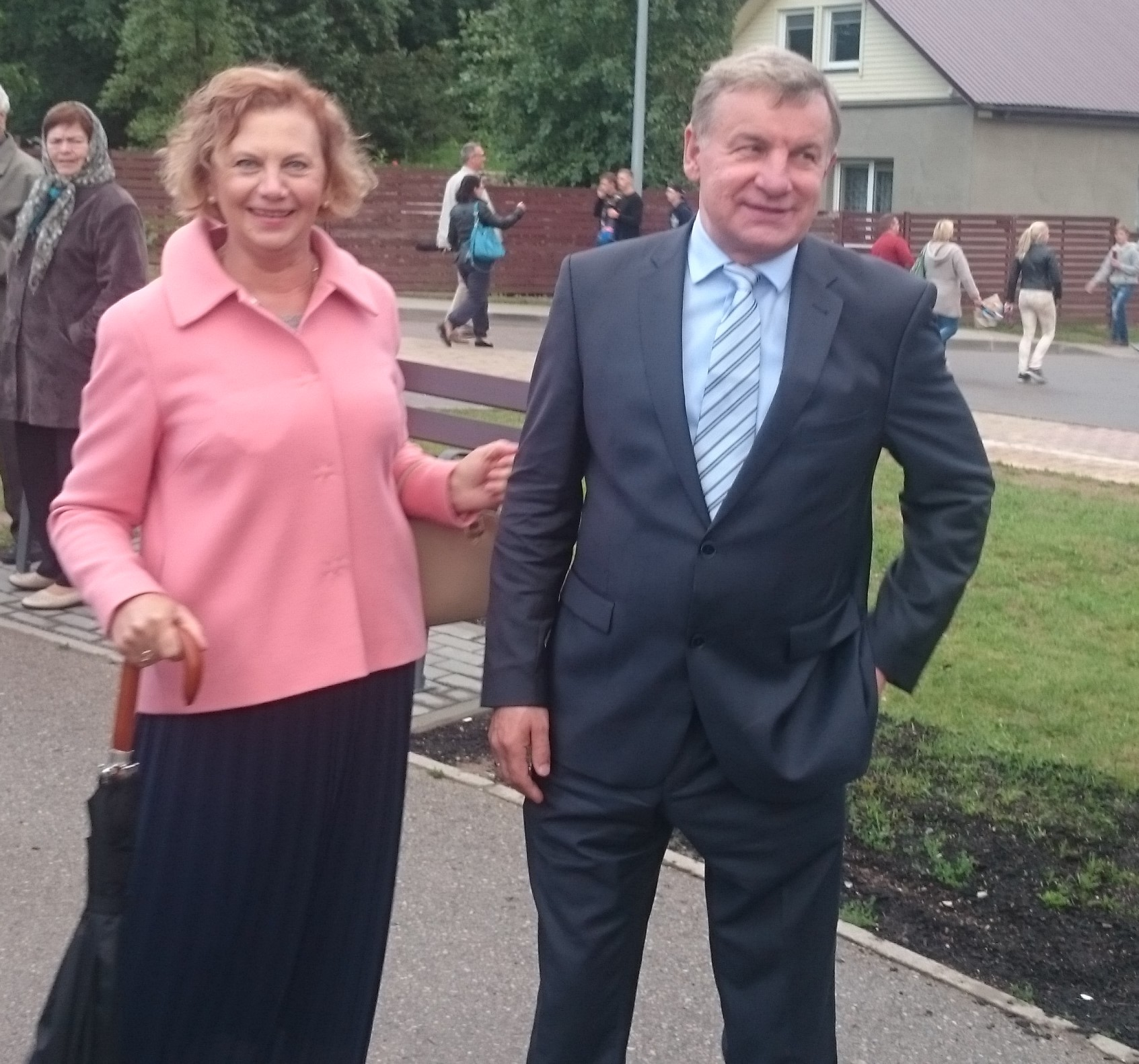
Rimantas Sinkevičius with his wife Ligita, July 2016

Sinkevičius is married. His wife Ligita is chief specialist at the Environmental Protection Agency under the Ministry of Environment. They have two children. Their son Mindaugas Sinkevičius has been Prime Minister of Lithuania since 2026. Their daughter Rūta is assistant to Vilnius district court judge.

Seimas
Preceded by Juozas Jaruševičius	Member of the Seimas for Jonava; 2008–2020	Succeeded by Eugenijus Sabutis
Preceded by Jūratė Matekonienė	Member of the Seimas for Jonava; 2000–2004	Succeeded by Juozas Jaruševičius
