= Žygimantas Vaičiūnas =

Lithuanian politician

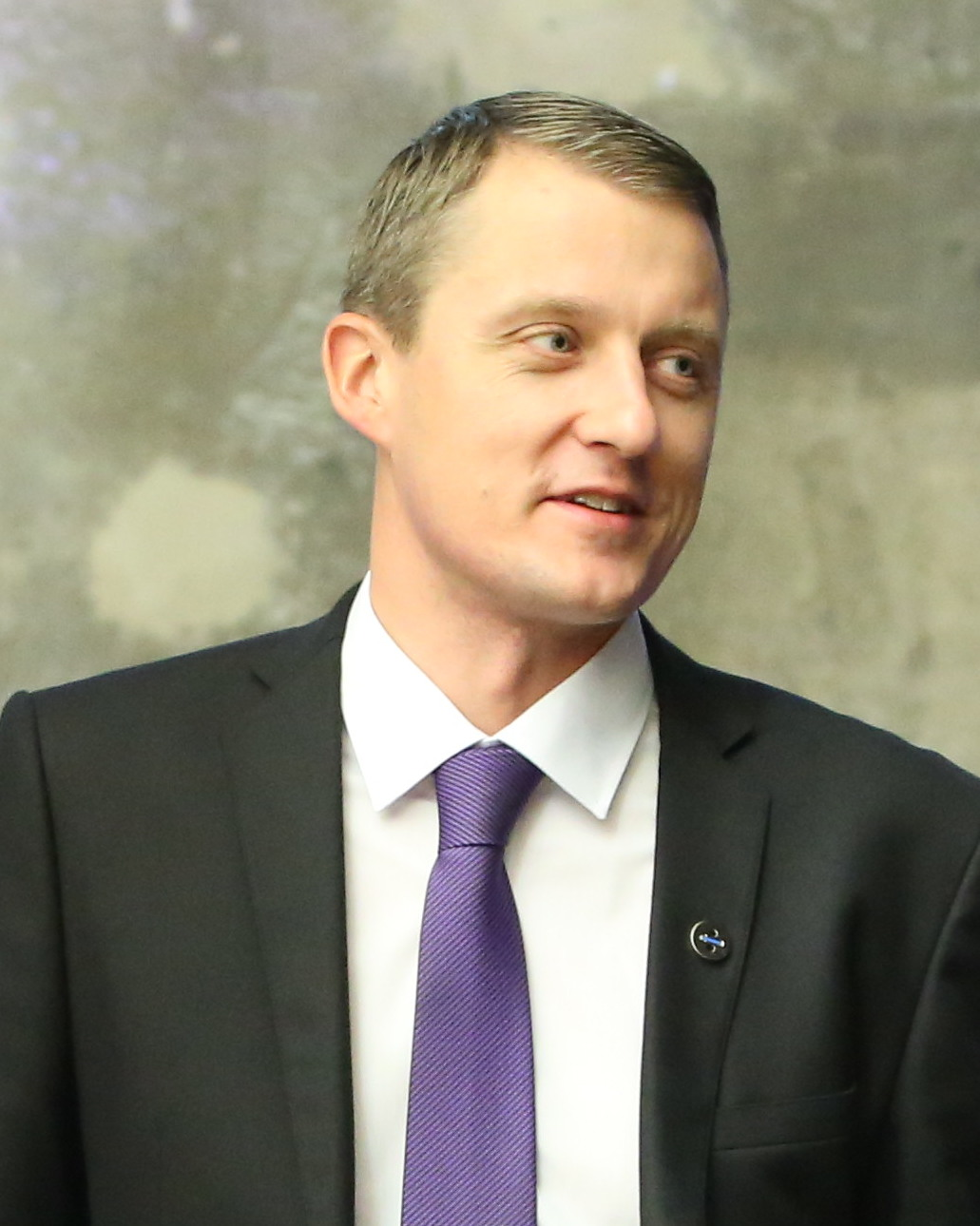
Vaičiūnas in 2017

Žygimantas Vaičiūnas (born 19 January 1982) is a Lithuanian politician. He served as Minister of Energy in the cabinet of Prime Minister Saulius Skvernelis from 13 December 2016 to 11 December 2020. Dainius Kreivys was appointed as his successor.

He was Minister of Energy from 12 December 2024 to 4 August 2025.

In March 2025, he represented Lithuania at the European Union's Transport, Telecommunications and Energy Council in Brussels, where he advocated for enhanced protection and resilience of critical energy infrastructure and highlighted the Baltic states' leadership in energy independence and infrastructure safeguarding.
