= Fabijoniškės =

- Eldership
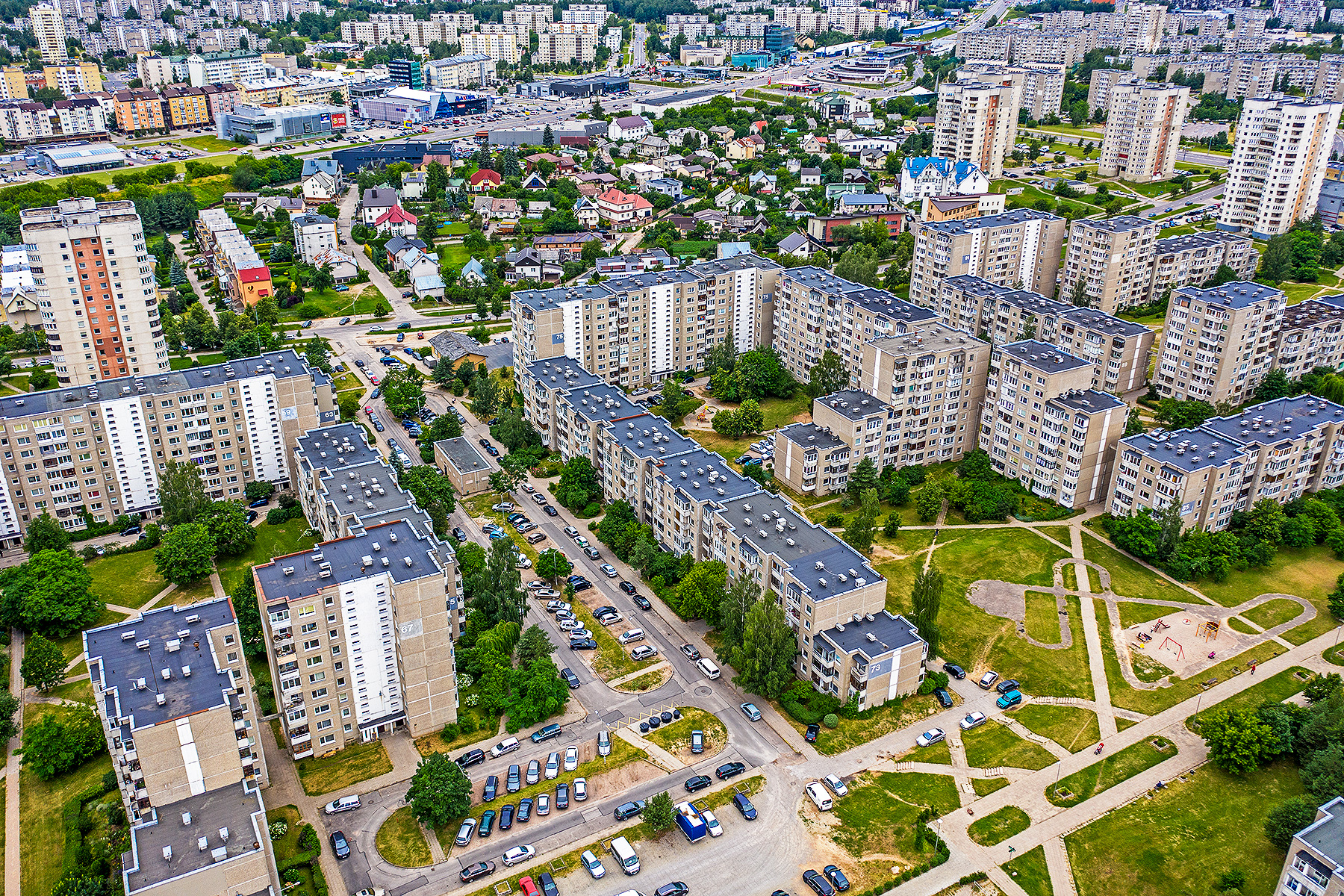
- Aerial view of Fabijoniškės

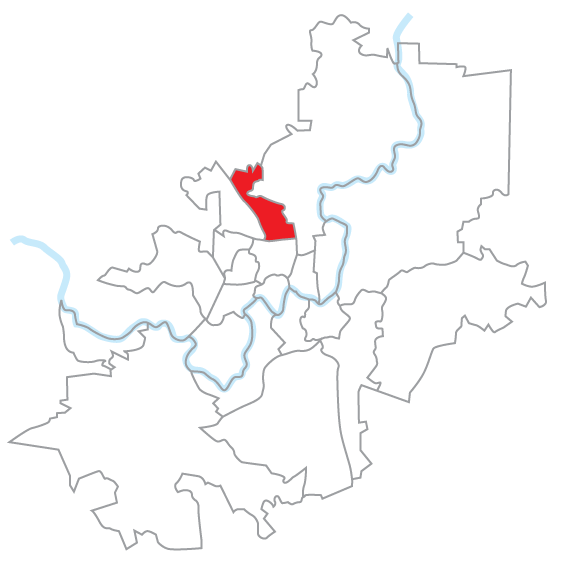
- Location of Fabijoniškės eldership within Vilnius

- Location of Fabijoniškės
- Country: Lithuania
- County: Vilnius County
- Municipality: Vilnius city municipality

Area
  - Total: 4.1 km^{2} (1.6 sq mi)

Population (2021)
  - Total: 37,006
  - Density: 9,000/km^{2} (23,000/sq mi)
- Time zone: UTC+2 (EET)
  - Summer (DST): UTC+3 (EEST)

Fabijoniškės located in the northern part of Vilnius, is one of the newest districts of Vilnius municipality, built in the late 1980s to early 1990s in the territory of former Fabijoniškės village.

Fabijoniškės was the production site of the HBO miniseries Chernobyl during filming in 2018, where the district was used to portray the city of Pripyat.
