= 1940 Lithuanian parliamentary election =

- 14–15 July 1940
- All 79 seats in the People's Seimas; 40 seats needed for a majority
- Turnout: 95.51%
Party	Leader	Vote %	Seats
Union of the Working People of Lithuania	Antanas Sniečkus	99.19	79
This lists parties that won seats. See the complete results below.
Prime Minister before	Chairman of the Council of People's Commissars after
Vincas Krėvė-Mickevičius; Independent	Mečislovas Gedvilas; LKP

Parliamentary elections were held in Republic of Lithuania on 14–15 July 1940 to the People's Seimas. The Soviet-appointed puppet government of Lithuania held elections to the parliament in 1940 illegally; the candidate lists were drawn up exclusively by the Communist Party of Lithuania, in coordination with the Soviet envoys. The elections were held under conditions of terror and the results were falsified. There was a broad international consensus that the subsequent Soviet annexation of Lithuania was illegal.

== Background ==
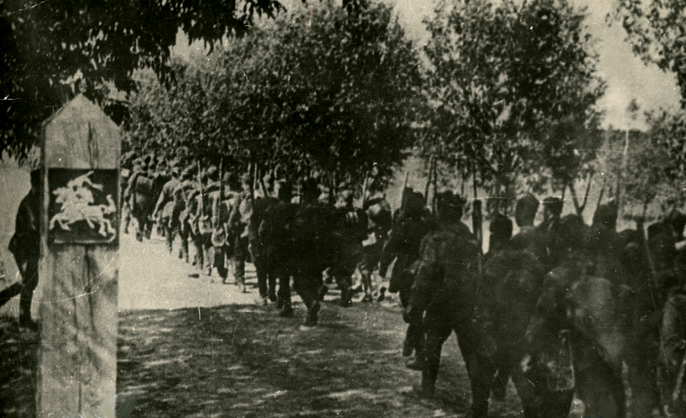
Soviet troops enter Lithuania, June 1940.

On 23 August 1939, Nazi Germany and the Soviet Union signed the Molotov–Ribbentrop Pact, which included the secret protocol dividing most of Eastern Europe into spheres of influence. On 1 September, Germany invaded Poland and, a few weeks later, the Soviet Union invaded Poland from the east.

After inciting several incidents and accusing Lithuania of anti-Soviet policies, on 14 June 1940, the Soviet Union delivered an ultimatum to Lithuania to accept an unlimited number of Soviet troops. Although formally given a 1-day deadline, Soviet Foreign Minister Vyacheslav Molotov verbally told Juozas Urbšys that Soviet troops would be deployed regardless of Lithuania's response. On the night of 15 June, President Antanas Smetona and the cabinet debated whether to resist the Soviet Union militarily. Smetona spoke in favor, but only a few ministers supported him, while the army chief Vincas Vitkauskas and former chief Stasys Raštikis spoke against. In the morning, the government accepted the Soviet ultimatum and President Smetona left the country as two Soviet armies crossed the Lithuanian border; it was the beginning of the occupation of Lithuania.

=== Occupation ===
Soviet leader Joseph Stalin sent Vladimir Dekanozov to Lithuania as a special envoy, accompanied by NKVD brigades. Dekanozov arrived in Lithuania on 15 June 1940 and, together with the Soviet envoy Nikolai Pozdnyakov, began forming a puppet government. After the president and defense minister fled the country, Dekanozov effectively took over Lithuania's internal affairs, appointing pro-Soviet Lithuanian figures to key positions. On 16 June, the Minister of the Interior Kazys Skučas and the Director of the State Security Department (VSD) Augustinas Povilaitis were arrested and imprisoned, while the Prime Minister and acting President Antanas Merkys did not resist Soviet demands and on 17 June illegally approved the Soviet-selected cabinet. Justas Paleckis was appointed Prime Minister; Merkys resigned shortly afterwards and Paleckis also took over the presidency. On 18 June, Antanas Sniečkus, Secretary of the Lithuanian Communist Party, was released from prison and the following day was appointed to be director of the VSD.

In June and July 1940, Soviet envoys gradually took control of the Lithuanian cabinet as well as key government institutions and began to dismantle the country's political system. There was a gradual removal of civil servants and officials from the state institutions, replacing them with communists or other individuals collaborating with the Soviet regime.

== Elections ==
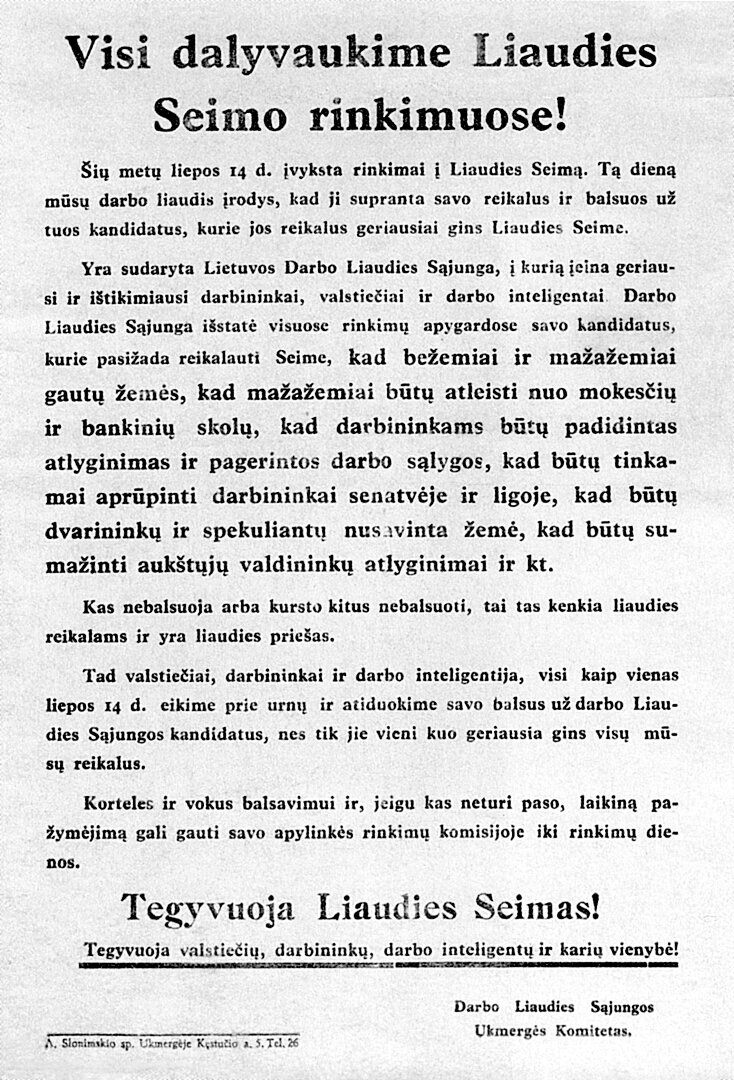
A campaign poster calling those who do not vote or who encourage others not to vote "enemies of the people".

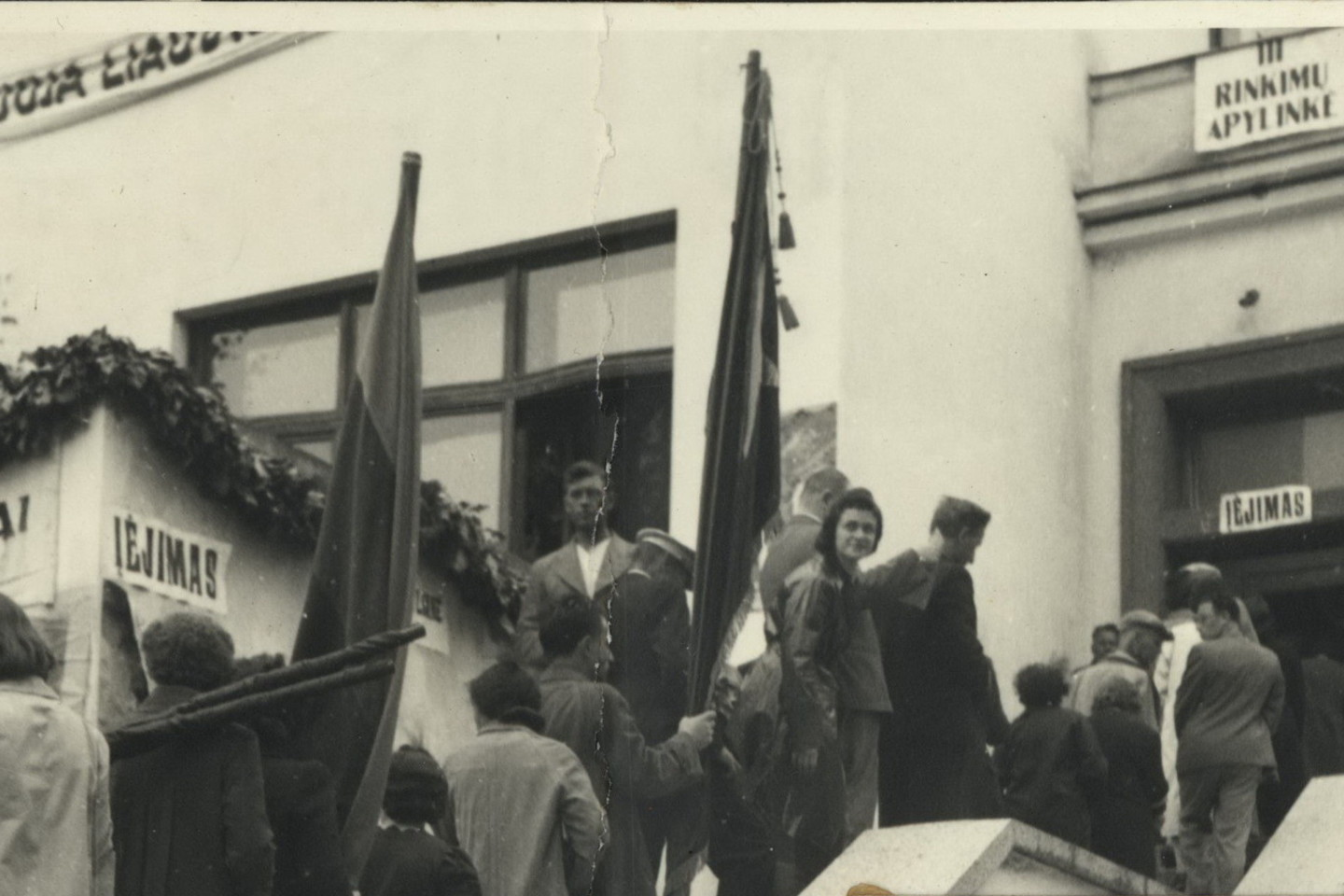
A polling station in Kaunas.

Having taken control of the Lithuanian government and institutions, the Soviet Union sought to complete the occupation process: in order to carry out the annexation, in July 1940, Soviet envoys began planning and directing new elections. At the end of June, the Seimas was dissolved and, on July 1, all political, cultural, and religious organizations were banned. Only three newspapers were allowed to publish and their editors were changed in order to carry out active pro-Soviet agitation. According to the scenario prepared by the Soviet envoy Dekanozov, the organization of the electoral process was entrusted to the Communist Party of Lithuania (LKP). On July 5, the Justas Paleckis cabinet illegally adopted a new electoral law by "resolution"; the law was drafted according to the instructions of Dekanozov and the LKP. According to the new electoral rules, only one candidate was allowed to be nominated for one seat. A new Central Electoral Commission was appointed, with a majority of members composed of communists; Vladas Niunka, a member of the LKP Central Committee, was appointed as the chairman of the commission. On July 6, the governments of Lithuania and the other Baltic states simultaneously announced new parliamentary elections to be held on July 14.

Only one organization was put forward for the elections – the Union of the Working People of Lithuania (Lithuanian: Lietuvos darbo liaudies sąjunga), founded on July 6; other organizations were prohibited from nominating candidates. The list of candidates was exclusively drawn up by the Communist Party of Lithuania, in close coordination with Soviet envoys. Of the 79 candidates, 38, i.e. almost half, were communists. In order to mislead the public, other candidates were not the members of communist organisations and not necessarily holding the communist views; however, they were selected as willing to cooperate with the Soviet regime or as easily manipulated; some candidates were persuaded to participate using threats and intimidation; also, some candidates were not informed about the nomination and learned about their participation only from public announcements. In the Ukmergė constituency, "Jonas Abakonis" was nominated as a candidate and introduced as "30 years old, a peasant"; A. Bakonis was the real person who was intended to be nominated, but the wrong surname and name were registered in the candidate list. The LKP and the electoral commission realised that the candidate technically did not exist only after the results were announced. Among the nominated candidates were also well-known public figures, such as Petras Cvirka, Liudas Gira, Antanas Venclova and others.

On July 6–7, pro-Soviet rallies were organized by the communists that started the intense political agitation. Until the elections, the Union of the Working People did not officially announce any plans of Sovietization, collectivization, nationalization of property, or plans for Lithuania to formally join the Soviet Union. However, there was agitation and public calls for a very close relationship and "brotherhood" with the USSR. During the agitation, various greater welfare promises were made to the public, especially focusing on the workers and peasants. However, Soviet envoys ensured that the intimidation tactics would also be used during the campaign: the notion of "enemy of the people" was disseminated in public; people were particularly intimidated by the introduction of passport marking during the election. In the last week before the elections, the first arrests of Lithuanian officials and public figures began; during July 10–17, the VSD, led by Antanas Sniečkus and under the supervision of Soviet NKVD instructors, arrested 504 individuals.

The elections were formally held on 14–15 July, barely a month after the Soviet military occupation of Lithuania. The election results were rigged. According to officially published information, the turnout was 95.51%, of whom 99.19% voted for the candidates nominated by the sole Union of the Working People. Voter lists were not compiled, and the Central Electoral Commission did not publish any detailed voting results (e.g., how many voters voted for each candidate). Some officially published participation rates exceeded 100%, e.g. in Panevėžys city – 106%, Biržai – 123%, Raseiniai – 105%, Mažeikiai – 102%, etc. Based on surviving documents from some constituencies, it is likely that up to 85% of voters attended the election. However, based on constituency documents, it is likely that many candidates did not receive 50% and could not have been elected even under the new electoral rules. Although there is no precise and reliable data, historians estimate that a larger part of Lithuanian society nevertheless participated in the elections. The main reasons for participation were: psychological pressure and intimidation, passport marking and arrests on the eve of the elections. Part of the society also participated believing communist propaganda, due to poor understanding of the political processes of the occupation as well as true intentions of the Soviet Union.

The communist leadership also sought to conceal the fact that the technically non-existent candidate "Jonas Abakonis" was elected in Ukmergė constituency; on August 17 Antanas Sniečkus simply announced that "Jonas Abakonis did not take up the duties of a representative". In his place, Justas Paleckis was "elected" on October 20 - according to the official announcement, with a turnout of 91.82% of voters, of whom 99.24% voted in favour.

== Aftermath ==
The communists began organising rallies for Lithuania's incorporation into the USSR even before the elections were officially over. On July 17, a meeting of all three Soviet envoys to the Baltic states – Vladimir Dekanozov, Andrey Vyshinsky (envoy to Latvia) and Andrei Zhdanov (envoy to Estonia) – took place, during which they coordinated the tasks of the puppet parliaments. On July 21, People's Seimas adopted the declaration on the introduction of the Soviet system and Lithuania was declared a Soviet Socialist Republic. A declaration on the accession of the Lithuanian SSR to the Soviet Union was also adopted. Essentially identical declarations were adopted on the same day by all three puppet parliaments of the Baltic states.

On July 30, a delegation of 20 representatives appointed by the People's Seimas, led by Justas Paleckis, left for Moscow by train; on August 3, they presented the declaration on the accession to the Supreme Soviet of the Soviet Union. On 3 August 1940, the Soviet Union formally annexed Lithuania.

== Legality ==
The Soviet-appointed puppet government, elections, and newly proclaimed People's Seimas were illegal. The changes of government were carried out during the Soviet Union's military aggression and occupation of Lithuania; the Soviet Union violated Article 1 of the 1920 Soviet–Lithuanian Peace Treaty; Articles 2, 3, and 5 of the 1926 Soviet–Lithuanian Non-Aggression Pact; and even Article 7 of the 1939 Soviet–Lithuanian Mutual Assistance Treaty. The Soviet Union's actions also violated the 1929 Kellogg–Briand Pact, as both Lithuania and Soviet Union were parties to the treaty.

The elections were rigged throughout the entire process, from the selection of candidates and the election commission to the announcement of the results. The elections were organised in rush and the passport marking as well as other forms of intimidation violated the principle of electoral secrecy. In addition to the acts of coercion and the falsification of results, the 1938 Constitution of Lithuania and laws in force at the time were also violated. Acting President Antanas Merkys did not have the constitutional right to appoint a new head of government. The election law was amended by decree, a procedure that was also not allowed under the constitution.

== Significance ==
The People's Seimas was an instrument of the Soviet Union to carry out the annexation of independent Lithuania. The Soviet leadership organised the sham election in order to create the impression that Lithuania had voluntarily agreed to renounce its independence. The 1940 elections and the decisions of the People's Seimas were later used in Russian disinformation campaigns to create the impression that Lithuania and the other Baltic states had voluntarily joined the Soviet Union.

== See also ==
- 1940 Estonian parliamentary election
- 1940 Latvian parliamentary election
- State continuity of the Baltic states

== Bibliography ==
- Anušauskas, Arvydas (1996). Lietuvių tautos sovietinis naikinimas 1940-1958 metais. Vilnius: Mintis. ISBN 5417007137.
- Eidintas, Alfonsas; Žalys, Vytautas; Senn, Alfred Erich (1999). Tuskenis, Edvardas (ed.). Lithuania in European Politics: The Years of the First Republic, 1918-1940. New York: St. Martin's Press. ISBN 0-312-22458-3.
- Eidintas, Alfonsas; Bumblauskas, Alfredas; Kulakauskas, Antanas; Tamošaitis, Mindaugas (2013). Lietuvos istorija (2 ed.). Vilnius: Vilniaus universiteto leidykla. ISBN 9786094590924.
- Hiden, Johan; Salmon, Patrick (1994) [1991]. The Baltic Nations and Europe (Revised ed.). Harlow, England: Longman. ISBN 058225650X.
- Lebedeva, Natalija (2007). "SSSR ir Pabaltijys 1939-1941 metais (Lietuvos pavyzdys)". In Anušauskas, Arvydas; Laurinavičius, Česlovas (eds.). Lietuva Antrajame pasauliniame kare: straipsnių rinkinys. Vilnius: Lietuvos istorijos instituto leidykla. p. 637. ISBN 978-9986-780-93-9.
- Maslauskienė, Nijolė (2000). "Valdininkijos šalinimas iš okupuotos Lietuvos administracijos ir jos keitimas okupantų talkininkais 1940 m. birželio-gruodžio mėn". Genocidas ir Rezistencija. 2 (8): 7–41. doi:10.61903/GR.2000.201.
- Senn, Alfred Erich (2007). Lithuania 1940: revolution from above. Amsterdam – New York, NY: Rodopi. ISBN 9789042022256.
- Svarauskas, Artūras (2018). "Kodėl dalyvauta ir už ką balsuota rinkimuose į Liaudies seimą 1940 metais?". Lietuvos istorijos metraštis. 2018 (2): 101–128.
- von Rauch, Georg (1974). The Baltic States: the years of independence; Estonia, Latvia, Lithuania, 1917-1940. Berkeley: University of California Press. ISBN 9780312125219.
- Truska, Liudas (1995). Lietuva 1938–1953 metais. Kaunas: Šviesa. ISBN 5430019070.
- Žalimas, Dainius (2003). "Sovietinė agresija prieš Lietuvą 1940 metais: nepagrįsti mėginimai ją pateisinti tarptautinės teisės požiūriu". Jurisprudencija. 46 (38): 11–28.
