= Vincas Vitkauskas =

Lithuanian general (1890–1965)

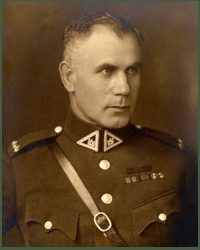
- Born: 4 October 1890; Užbaliai, Suwałki Governorate, Congress Poland
- Died: 3 March 1965 (aged 74); Kaunas, Lithuanian SSR, Soviet Union
- Burial place: Petrašiūnai Cemetery
- Military career
- Allegiance: Imperial Russian Army (1916–1918); Lithuanian Armed Forces (1919–1940); Red Army (1940–1954)
- Service years: 1916–1954
- Rank: Captain (October 1919); Major (18 May 1923); Polkovnik lieutenant (18 Feb. 1926); Polkovnik (1930); Lieutenant general (22 Nov. 1935); Divisional general (13 June 1939); Major general (30 August 1940); Lieutenant general (29 Dec. 1940)
- Commands: Commander of the Lithuanian Army
- Conflicts: World War I; Romanian Front; Lithuanian Wars of Independence
- Awards: Order of the Cross of Vytis; Order of Vytautas the Great; Order of Lenin

Vincas Vitkauskas (4 October 1890 – 3 March 1965) was a Lithuanian general. He became commander of the Lithuanian Army after the resignation of Stasys Raštikis in January 1940. In this capacity, Vitkauskas opposed armed resistance to the Soviet occupation in June 1940 and subsequently collaborated with the new Soviet regime.

During World War I, he was mobilized to the Imperial Russian Army and served in the Romanian Front where he became close friends with Antanas Merkys. This relationship proved crucial in Vitkauskas' career. He returned to Lithuania in 1918 and fought in the Lithuanian Wars of Independence. Thanks to Merkys, Vitkauskas became deputy commander of the Lithuanian Military Brigade and commandant of Klaipėda in the aftermath of the Klaipėda Revolt. Despite success in the field and evaluation as a capable officer, his military career was dampened by rumors and suspicions that he sympathized with the Bolsheviks and socialists. He resigned active duty in 1927 and worked as a lecturer at the Higher Officers' Courses in Kaunas. After the completion of training with the German Reichswehr in 1929, Vitkauskas became inspector of the infantry and helped Stasys Raštikis, commander of the army, to implement much needed reforms. He was particularly involved with practical training and military exercises. In October 1939, Vitkauskas led Lithuanian troops to Vilnius – the historical capital of the Grand Duchy of Lithuania which was fiercely contested between Lithuania and Poland since 1920. It was a prominent assignment that brought public recognition.

In November 1939, Merkys became Prime Minister. Raštikis resigned in January 1940 and was replaced by Vitkauskas. When Soviet Union presented an ultimatum on 14 June, Vitkauskas argued against armed resistance. The ultimatum was accepted and Lithuania lost its independence. Vitkauskas collaborated with the new regime becoming Minister of Defense in the People's Government, an elected delegate of the People's Seimas, and a member of the delegation that presented Joseph Stalin with a Lithuanian petition to become one of the republics of the Soviet Union. The Lithuanian Army was reorganized into the 29th Rifle Corps of the Red Army commanded by Vitkauskas. In June 1941, just before the German invasion of the Soviet Union, Vitkauskas was sent to the Military Academy of the General Staff in Moscow where he studied and later taught until early 1946. He returned to Lithuania and taught at the University of Kaunas and Kaunas Polytechnic Institute until retirement in 1954.

== Biography ==
=== Early life ===
Vitkauskas was born in the Užbaliai village, then part of the Congress Poland, a puppet state of the Russian Empire. His parents were poor peasants. His father traveled to United States where he worked as a coal miner in Pennsylvania for seven years to save up enough money to buy 12 hectares (30 acres) of land in Lankeliškiai. He continued to work the farm until his death in 1937. Between ages of 7 and 11, Vitkauskas attended a primary people's school in Lankeliškiai but financial difficulties did not allow to continue the education. He remained home and helped his father with farm work. During the Russian Revolution of 1905, Vitkauskas and his elder brother helped smuggling publications and weapons from East Prussia to Marijampolė.

In 1908, at the age of 18, Vitkauskas resumed his education as an external student in Marijampolė (1908–12) and Vilkaviškis (1912–13). To earn a living, he worked as a tutor. In 1914, he took high school exams at the 2nd Gymnasium, known as Alekseevskaya (Russian: Алексеевская), in Oryol and obtained a high school diploma. He then became a mathematics student at the Moscow State University. In the evenings, he also took classes at the Stroganov Academy of Arts.

=== World War I ===
In 1916, he was mobilized to the Imperial Russian Army. From 1 June to 1 December, Vitkauskas was a student at the Alekseevskoe Military School. After graduation, as a praporshchik, he was assigned to the 193rd Infantry Reserve Regiment. In January 1917, he was sent to machine gun courses at the Infantry Officers' School in Oranienbaum. In March, he was sent to Voronezh where he joined the 59th Infantry Regiment. His machine gun company was moved to the 5th Infantry Regiment, part of the 9th Army, and deployed in the Romanian Front. By the end of the war, he was promoted to podporuchik and commander of the machine gun company. He demobilized in February 1918 and waited until September in Kiev to get the permission from the Germans to return to Lithuania.

=== Lithuanian Wars of Independence ===
==== Against the Bermontians ====
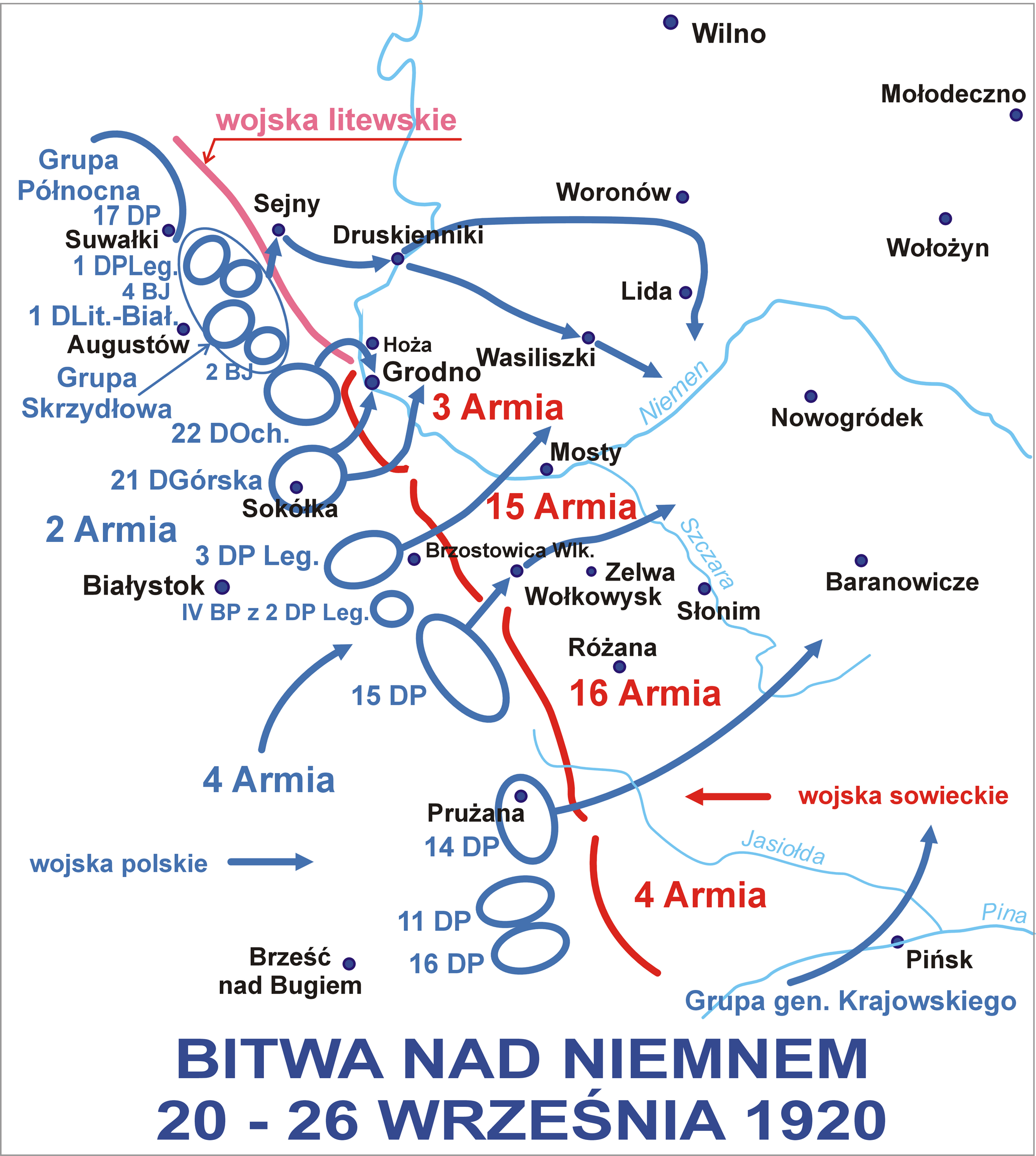
Map of the Battle of the Niemen River: 3rd Battalion, commanded by Vitkauskas, managed to outmarch Polish encirclement from Hoža via Lida to Ashmyany

He returned to his native village in October and joined the fledgling Lithuanian government to become the county governor of Vilkaviškis. On 1 February 1919, he volunteered to the newly established Lithuanian Army and was assigned as the commandant of Raseiniai. There he organized a company and faced the threat of the Bermontians.

On 21 October, an ammunition shipment to Raseiniai was attacked by the Bermontians near Šimkaičiai. The Lithuanians defended and killed six attackers. In retaliation, the Bermontians attacked Jurbarkas on 25 October and Raseiniai on 26 October. They looted and took valuables. In Raseiniai, they searched for Vitkauskas but unable to find him captured lieutenant Vincas Rimavičius and later executed him. Vitkauskas and other men retreated to Girkalnis and Betygala.

At the end of May 1919, Vitkauskas' brother Juozas, who served in the Red Army and fought Lithuanians in the Lithuanian–Soviet War, was captured and executed by the Lithuanian Army. That cast a doubt on Vitkauskas' loyalties and on 15 January 1920 he was demoted to commander of a machine gun company with the 7th Infantry Regiment. On 10 July, he was promoted to the commander of the 3rd Battalion of the 7th Infantry Regiment. At the time, the battalion was stationed in Vilnius.

==== Against Poland ====
On 21 September, during the Battle of the Niemen River, he was given urgent orders to depart to Hoža and take up defensive position along the Neman River. At the time, the battalion had 500 men and only 5 officers and no telephones. In Hoža, Vitkauskas learned that Lithuanian forces moved to Druskininkai where Polish forces concentrated their attack. Vitkauskas contacted the commander of Russian forces in Grodno who promised to send 48th and 49th Infantry Regiments but they never showed. Polish forces took Druskininkai and began their advance towards Hoža. Vitkauskas ordered a retreat to Parečča, a railway station on the Saint Petersburg–Warsaw Railway, but Polish forces got there first. The battalion was cut off from other Lithuanian units. Vitkauskas then decided to march back to Aziory. The next day they marched to Novy Dvor (Shchuchyn District) but it was also taken by the Polish Army. The battalion turned to Vasilishki and pushed to Lida where it found some men from the 1st Battalion of the 7th Infantry Regiment. Vitkauskas managed to get permission from the Russian commander to gather the men and continue to Ashmyany which they reached on 30 September 1919. From there, they turned to Vilnius and reunited with Lithuanian forces. In total, to escape the encirclement and capture, Vitkauskas led some 750 men who marched 310 kilometres (190 mi) in 7 days in very difficult circumstances due to lack of food for the men and feed for the horses.

While the 7th Infantry Regiment was recuperating and regrouping in Vilnius, Polish General Lucjan Żeligowski began an attack towards the city on 8 October 1920. The action became known as the Żeligowski's Mutiny. Vitkauskas commanded the 1st and the 3rd Battalions of the 7th Infantry Regiment and took the positions across the Vilnius–Ukmergė road north of Vilnius. On 15–16 October, his men successfully attacked Polish positions near Riešė but Vitkauskas was injured. For his actions in fighting the Poles, Vitkauskas was awarded the Order of the Cross of Vytis (1st type, 1st class).

=== Interwar Lithuania ===
==== Stalling career ====
Despite success in the field and evaluation as a capable officer, Vitkauskas was demoted to commander of a company of the 7th Infantry Regiment on 2 August 1921. Minister of Defence Konstantinas Žukas thought that Vitkauskas was a Bolshevik sympathizer. However, on 6 September, he was transferred to the staff of the Lithuanian Military Brigade (Lithuanian: Vietinės kariuomenės brigada), a unit established in February 1920 to maintain public security. At the time, the brigade was commanded by Antanas Merkys, a friend from the Romanian Front, who trusted Vitkauskas to become his deputy. Vitkauskas officially became the commander of the brigade's staff on 12 October 1922. In December, he began studies at the Higher Officers' Courses in Kaunas but the studies were interrupted by the Klaipėda Revolt in January 1923. He was one of the Lithuanian soldiers sent to stage the revolt. Under the codename Vilius Kremeris, he was head of the administration of the rebel forces. In April, he was called to become commandant of Klaipėda. This position was also Merkys' doing – he was a secretary to Antanas Smetona, the Commissioner of the Klaipėda Region. A month later he was promoted to major.

When the office of the commandant of Klaipėda was liquidated in November 1923, he was reassigned to the 3rd military district as commander of the 1st general staff. Concurrently, from January to September 1924, he was the commander of the staff of the 3rd Infantry Division. In September 1924, Vitkauskas began law studies at the University of Lithuania. Though he completed most of his courses and examinations, he never graduated. In February 1925, he was temporarily assigned as the commander of the 9th Infantry Regiment, stationed in Marijampolė. After the May 1926 elections to the Third Seimas, Christian Democrats lost their majority and Vitkauskas' command was made permanent and he was awarded the Order of the Cross of Vytis (2nd type, 1st class).

In December 1926, Vitkauskas together with many other military officers traveled to Kaunas for the celebration of the 60th birthday of President Kazys Grinius. The occasion was used to stage the military coup d'état that brought Antanas Smetona to power. The morning after the coup, all commanders of military units were ordered to report to the General Staff. That night Vitkauskas visited his in-laws and did not receive the order. When he did not report on time, rumors started spreading about his political leanings reviving old suspicions of his socialist sympathies. The new government did not trust Vitkauskas and started gathering intelligence on him. He kept his command of the 9th Infantry Regiment because of Antanas Merkys, who was now Minister of Defence. However, Vitkauskas felt the distrust and submitted a resignation which was granted on 4 May 1927. He became an instructor of the Higher Officers' Courses and worked there until mid-1930.

==== Career resumed ====
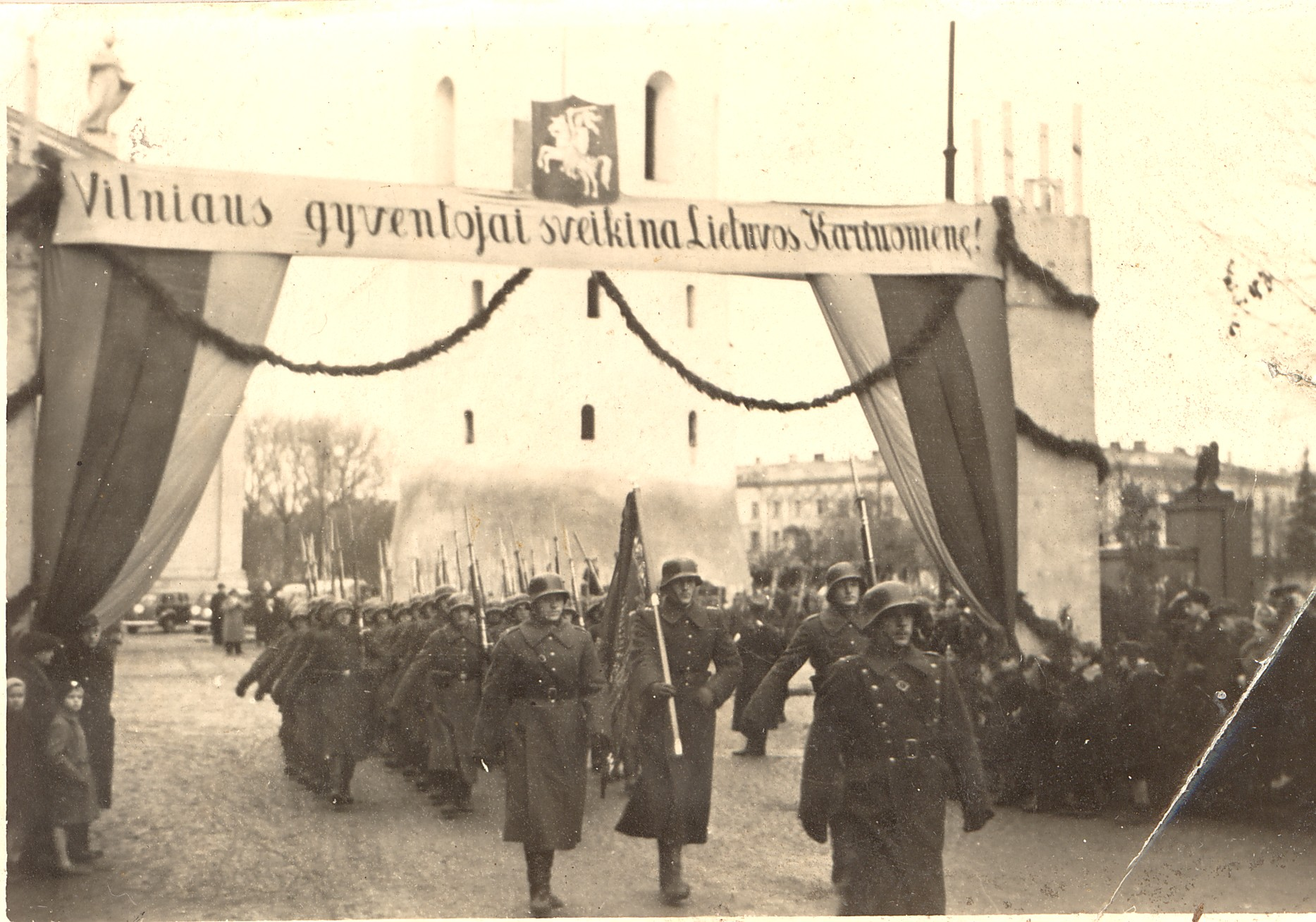
Lithuanian troops, commanded by Vitkauskas, enter Vilnius in October 1939

In April–November 1929, Vitkauskas along with pulkininkai Aleksandras Plechavičius and Oskaras Urbonas was sent for a training with the 7th (Bavarian) Division of the Reichswehr. After his return, he was sent to a six-month higher courses for officers in Kaunas and, upon the completion, was promoted to the inspector of the infantry on 1 July 1930 and the inspector of the army on 1 April 1934. The armed forces were reorganized by Stasys Raštikis and Vitkauskas once again became the inspector of the infantry in August 1935. He continued to improve his military knowledge by inspecting German proving grounds and observing their military exercises, learning about anti-aircraft defense in Switzerland, and touring infantry schools and shooting rages in the Soviet Union. He further briefly visited France, Belgium, Italy, Denmark. In Lithuania, he spent a significant amount of time at the proving grounds educating others on machine guns, anti-aircraft and anti-tank defenses, mortars. He was active both in military practice (e.g. participated in military exercises) and theory (e.g. wrote 12 statutes, contributed to military press, published a book on heavy machine guns). In 1938, Vitkauskas was elected chairman of the officers' club (Karininkų ramovė).

Vitkauskas was appointed as the commander of the 1st Division on 4 April 1939 and promoted to divisional general in June. He had no formal military education, but Stasys Raštikis, commander of the army, valued his hard work, initiative, and dedication. In September 1939, after the Invasion of Poland, the Lithuanian Army was mobilized and Vitkauskas was commended for the smooth mobilization of his division and effective guard of the Lithuanian borders between Neris river and Latvia. In October, Lithuania gained a portion of the Vilnius Region according to the Soviet–Lithuanian Mutual Assistance Treaty. On 28 October, the Lithuanian Army entered Vilnius, which was fiercely contested between Poland and Lithuania, for the first time since 1920. The troops were commanded not by Raštikis but by Vitkauskas – the first public sign that Raštikis was losing favor with the Smetona's regime. Two weeks later, in an interview to Lietuvos žinios, Vitkauskas claimed that it was the happiest day of his life. This high-profile appointment was also linked with Merkys, who was appointed the Lithuanian representative to the region.

On 17 November 1939, Merkys became Prime Minister and offered Ministry of Defence to Vitkauskas, but he refused. Merkys' relationship with Raštikis was poor and Raštikis was forced into a three-month vacation for "health reasons" on 22 January 1940. In his duties, Raštikis was replaced not by his deputy divisional general Stasys Pundzevičius, but by Vitkauskas. It was a surprising appointment as he gained prominence only after the takeover of Vilnius, but he was described as a non-political candidate which was important to Smetona.

=== Soviet occupation ===
According to the Molotov–Ribbentrop Pact of August 1939 and the subsequent German–Soviet Boundary and Friendship Treaty, Lithuania became part of the Russian sphere of influence. Delayed by the Winter War with Finland, Soviet Union began heightening tensions in late spring 1940 just as Nazi Germany was winning the Battle of France. Though the Lithuanian government and army had several months to plan for a contingency, the reaction was sluggish and no decisive steps were taken. The military developed a defensive plan against Russia (known as Plan R), but it was just a slightly modified Plan L for defense against Poland.

Before midnight on 14 June 1940, Soviet Union issued an ultimatum to Lithuania. The Lithuanian government, given less than 12 hours to respond, held an emergency meeting that night. Vitkauskas, as commander of the army, opposed calls for armed resistance. The government voted to accept the ultimatum and Lithuania lost its independence. Vitkauskas departed to Hudahaj station on the Libau–Romny Railway to meet the new Soviet contingents. President Antanas Smetona and Minister of Defense Kazys Musteikis fled to Nazi Germany. Merkys became acting President and named Vitkauskas to replace Musteikis. Two days later, as directed by Soviet envoy Vladimir Dekanozov, a new government led by Prime Minister Justas Paleckis was formed. It became known as the People's Government. Vitkauskas continued his role as Minister of Defense. Merkys no longer had any role in the government and attempted to escape to Sweden a month later.

Soviet officials began rapid Sovietization of Lithuania and its military. Already in July, the purge of the army started – Lithuanian officers were dismissed and replaced by more communist-leaning personnel, more vocal opponents of the Soviet regime were arrested. On 2 July 1940, People's Government issued order to reorganize the Army into the People's Army. This, among other things, introduced political commissars and a propaganda section. On 11 July, even before the elections to the People's Seimas, Soviet Commissar of Defense Semyon Timoshenko announced the creation of the Baltic Military District. The next day, Vitkauskas was replaced by major general Feliksas Baltušis-Žemaitis. Vitkauskas remained Minister of Defense though the position was largely deprived of any meaningful authority.

On 14–15 July, Vitkauskas was elected in the show election to the People's Seimas. The Seimas met on 21 July 1940. Its main order of business was a resolution creating the Lithuanian Soviet Socialist Republic and petitioning the Soviet Union to admit the new Lithuanian SSR into the Union. Vitkauskas was elected a member of the 20-member delegation to present the petition to the Supreme Soviet of the Soviet Union, which was approved on 3 August. Vitkauskas, together with Justas Paleckis, Icikas Meskupas-Adomas, and Antanas Sniečkus, was personally received by Joseph Stalin on 9 August. The next day he met with the Commissar of Defense Timoshenko and the Chief of the General Staff to discuss the liquidation of the Lithuanian Army.

On 17 August, it was officially declared that the Lithuanian People's Army was to be liquidated and reorganized into the 29th Rifle Corps of the Red Army. On 27 August, two days after the adoption of the new constitution copied from the 1936 Soviet Constitution, the order to liquidate the Ministry of Defense was given. Vitkauskas became the chairman of the liquidation commission, but he was mostly absent and most of the work of the commission was handled by his deputy Stasys Raštikis. On 1 September, he was appointed commander of the 29th Rifle Corps; Feliksas Baltušis-Žemaitis became his deputy but soon was replaced by Russian major general Anatoly Rozanov (Анатолий Николаевич Розанов). The process of liquidating the Lithuanian Army continued until December 1940. According to data provided by Raštikis, during that time, about 15% of lower and 30% of higher officers as well as almost 50% of the generals were purged. On 29 December, Lithuanian generals were officially given Red Army ranks. Only Vitkauskas was given the rank of lieutenant general. On 23 February 1941, Vitkauskas swore allegiance to the Red Army.

=== Later life ===
On 15 June 1941, just a week before the Nazi German invasion of Russia, Vitkauskas was sent to the Military Academy of the General Staff in Moscow to complete courses for higher officers. It was part of a larger initiative to send Lithuanian officers to various courses and replace them with Russians. Two explanations are given – as a preparation for the German invasion or a precaution against a possible mutiny due to the June deportation. According to Vitkaukas' wife, the orders to depart to Moscow were urgent and Vitkauskas was placed under armed guard at the railway station. After the completion of the courses in December 1941, he taught tactics of the great military formations. He was a member of the Supreme Soviet of the Soviet Union from 1941 to 1954.

In 1946, Vitkauskas returned to Lithuania and taught at the Kaunas University and from 1950 at the Kaunas Polytechnic Institute until retirement in November 1954. He became a member of the Communist Party of the Soviet Union in 1950 and was a member of the Supreme Soviet of the Lithuanian SSR from 1955 to 1963. Vitkauskas contributed articles, mostly memoirs and commentary on current events, to communist press, including Tiesa and Kauno tiesa. He wrote several poems for children, which were published in 1927, 1965, and 1980. He also translated plays by Alexander Ostrovsky (including The Storm published in 1948) and short stories by Aleksey Nikolayevich Tolstoy (first published in 1949). He died in 1965 and was buried in the Petrašiūnai Cemetery.

=== Evaluation ===
Vitkauskas is a controversial figure in the history of Lithuania. On one hand, he loyally served in the Lithuanian Army for over two decades (1919–1940). On the other hand, he actively collaborated with the Soviet regime that arrested and executed many Lithuanian officers. Opinions range widely: from a traitor and a sleeper Soviet agent to a desperate man who contemplated suicide (according to Jonas Černius) and mourned the loss of independence (according to his daughter). Historians further point out that Vitkauskas destroyed most sensitive and damning military archives before turning them to the Soviets. An objective evaluation is not possible due to lack of archival data (most relevant archives are kept in Russia).

== Awards ==
Vitkaukas received the following awards:

- Order of the Cross of Vytis (1920 and 1926)
- Independence Medal (1928)
- Silver Medal for the Liberation of Klaipėda (1929)
- Order of Vytautas the Great (1930)
- Order of the Lithuanian Grand Duke Gediminas (1934)
- Riflemen's Star by the Lithuanian Riflemen's Union (1938)
- Order of the Three Stars of Latvia (1938)
- Order of the Red Star (1945)
- Order of the Patriotic War (1947)
- Order of Lenin (1950)

== Bibliography ==
- Anušauskas, Arvydas; et al., eds. (2005). Lietuva, 1940–1990 (in Lithuanian). Vilnius: Lietuvos gyventojų genocido ir rezistencijos tyrimo centras. ISBN 9986-757-65-7.
- Blaževičius, Kazys (9 August 2006). "Komedija, vadinta "Liaudies seimo rinkimais"". XXI amžiaus horizontai (in Lithuanian). 13 (129). ISSN 2029-1299. Archived from the original on 19 January 2021.
- Čapenko, Aleksandr (2007). "Lietuvos liaudies armijos reorganizavimo į 29-ąjį teritorinį Raudonosios armijos šaulių pulko istorija 1940-1941 m." Karo Archyvas (in Lithuanian). 22: 353–363. doi:10.47459/ka.2007.22.9. ISSN 1392-6489. S2CID 240260761.
- Jankauskas, Juozas (2010). 1941 m. Birželio sukilimas Lietuvoje: pagrindiniai sukilimo organizatoriai, vadovai, ryšininkai ir pasiuntiniai (in Lithuanian). Vilnius: Lietuvos gyventojų genocido ir rezistencijos tyrimo centras. ISBN 978-609-8037-05-0.
- Januta, Donatas (October 6, 2009). "Gen. Vitkausko istorija ne jam vienam priklauso". Draugas (in Lithuanian). ISSN 2377-3286. Archived from the original on October 18, 2009.
- Jokubauskas, Vytautas (2014). "Lietuvos kariuomenės "R" planas (1939–1940 m.)". Istorija. Mokslo darbai (in Lithuanian). 93. ISSN 1392-0456.
- Knezys, Stasys (2004-01-30). "Lietuvos kariuomenės naikinimas (1940 m. birželio 15 d.–1941 m.)" (in Lithuanian). Genocide and Resistance Research Centre of Lithuania.
- Lesčius, Vytautas (2004). Lietuvos kariuomenė nepriklausomybės kovose 1918–1920 (PDF). Lietuvos kariuomenės istorija (in Lithuanian). Vilnius: General Jonas Žemaitis Military Academy of Lithuania. ISBN 9955-423-23-4. Archived from the original (PDF) on 2015-01-02.
- Lukšas, Aras (21 January 2011). "Generolas Vincas Vitkauskas politikos šunkeliuose" (in Lithuanian). Lietuvos žinios.
- Martinionis, Antanas (1993). Lietuvos kariuomenės tragedija (in Lithuanian). Vilnius: Mintis. ISBN 5417005843.
- Navaitis, Antanas (21 November 2008). "Lietuvos kariuomenės tragedija". XXI amžius (in Lithuanian). 88 (1681). ISSN 2029-1299. Archived from the original on 23 March 2014.
- Senn, Alfred Erich (2007). Lithuania 1940: Revolution from Above. On the Boundary of Two Worlds. Identity, Freedom, and Moral Imagination of the Baltics. Rodopi. ISBN 978-90-420-2225-6.
- Stoliarovas, Andriejus (2012). Tarpukario ir rezistencijos laikotarpio lietuvos generolų sąrašas ir jų amžinojo poilsio vietos (PDF) (in Lithuanian). Lietuvos kariuomenės generolų klubas. ISBN 978-609-412-030-5.
- Surgailis, Gintautas (1992). Lietuvos kariuomenės vadai (in Lithuanian). Vilnius: Mintis. ISBN 5-417-00513-4.
- Trohina, O. M. (2009). Гимназии Орловской губернии (XIX – начало ХХ вв). News Прошлое глазами историков. К 230-летию Орловской губернии (PDF) (in Russian). Oryol: Kartush. ISBN 978-5-9708-0162-8.
- Urbonas, Simas, ed. (1940). "Divizijos generolas Vincas Vitkauskas" (PDF). Karys (in Lithuanian). 18 (1098).
- Vaidotas, Edvinas (2014). "1923 m. Lietuvos karinė akcija Klaipėdos krašte" (PDF). Vytauto Didžiojo karo muziejus 2013 metais. Almanachas (in Lithuanian). ISSN 2029-3259. Archived from the original (PDF) on 2015-05-25.
- Vilkaviškio rajono savivaldybės viešoji biblioteka (2017). "Vitkauskas Vincas". Vilkaviškio krašto e-etnografijos akademija (in Lithuanian). Archived from the original on 2019-02-22.
- Zabielskas, Vytautas (2014-06-26). "Vitkauskas, Vincas". Visuotinė lietuvių enciklopedija (in Lithuanian). Mokslo ir enciklopedijų leidybos centras.
- Zinareva, O. (1983). V. Vitkausko bibliografija (PDF) (in Lithuanian). Partijos Istorijos Institutas prie LKP CK.
- Vaitkus, Evaldas (2016). "Viešojo saugumo tarnybos istorija" (in Lithuanian). Viešojo saugumo tarnyba prie Vidaus reikalų ministerijos. Archived from the original on 2018-10-10.

Military offices
Preceded by Stasys Raštikis	Commander of the Lithuanian Army; 22 January 1940 – 12 July 1940	Succeeded by Feliksas Baltušis-Žemaitis
Government offices
Preceded by Kazys Musteikis	Minister of Defense of Lithuania; 15 June 1940 – 27 August 1940	Succeeded by none
