= Union of the Working People of Lithuania =

Pro-Communist organization in Soviet-occupied Lithuania

Poster in Lithuanian, Yiddish and Polish languages reading "Worker! Vote and encourage others to vote for the candidates of the Lithuanian Labor Union"

The Union of the Working People of Lithuania or Union of Lithuanian Working People (Lithuanian: Lietuvos darbo liaudies sąjunga) was the front organization set up by the Communist Party of Lithuania after the Soviet occupation of Lithuania to take part in the rigged 1940 Lithuanian parliamentary election to the so-called "People's Seimas". The organization ceased to exist as soon as the elections passed.

Similar organizations were set up in the other two occupied Baltic States for the same purpose: Estonian Working People's Union and Latvian Working People's Bloc.

== History ==
=== Background ===
Soviet Union issued an ultimatum to Lithuania on 14 June 1940 which demanded that an unspecified number of Soviet soldiers be allowed to enter the Lithuanian territory and that a new pro-Soviet government (later known as the "People's Government") be formed. Lithuania accepted the ultimatum and Soviet soldiers entered the country on 15 June.

On 27 June, the People's Government dissolved the Fourth Seimas of Lithuania effective 1 July. On 5 July, the government announced the election for the "People's Seimas" to be held on 14 July and adopted a new electoral law. The law specified that only one candidate could stand for each of the 79 seats available in the parliament. Vladas Niunka, member of the Central Committee of the Communist Party of Lithuania who become the head of the electoral commission, later claimed that he was given just 12 hours to draft the election law under supervision of Vladimir Dekanozov, Soviet Deputy Commissar of Foreign Affairs.

=== Candidates ===
According to the electoral law, and similar to the 1936 Constitution of the Soviet Union, candidates were to be selected during meetings of the working people. Such meetings had to be organized by electoral commissions of voting districts. Candidates could be nominated by cultural, educational, labour, etc. groups that were operating legally in Lithuania. However, Mečislovas Gedvilas, Minister of Internal Affairs, outlawed any non-communist organizations. Effectively, the only legal organizations were the Communist Party of Lithuania, Lithuanian Komsomol, Lithuanian Red Aid, and communist-controlled workers' unions.

Vladas Niunka supervised the process of selecting candidates. Local officials were given only three days to present a list of the candidates. The census of the candidates was predetermined in advance: there should be up to 40 members of the Communist Party of Lithuania, 7 members of the Lithuanian Komsomol, and others non-party. There were also requirements to have a certain number of candidates by occupation, sex, and nationality. To obfuscate the role of the Communist Party of Lithuania, the candidates were listed under the newly announced Union of the Working People of Lithuania. Historian Alfred Erich Senn described the union as "a name without an organization".

The list of candidates was finalized and announced on 9 July. While ostensibly half of the candidates were non-communists, they were politically inexperienced and without greater political influence. Several of the candidates later proclaimed that they did not consent or were not even informed that they were listed on the ballot. In a rush to get the candidate lists, one candidate's name was misprinted as Jonas Abakonis instead of A. Bakonis. Soviet officials did not admit the mistake and did not provide any reason why Abakonis did not show up for the proceedings of the People's Seimas.

=== Electoral platform ===
The electoral platform of the Union of the Working People of Lithuania was published on 6 July. It was written by Niunka, Liudas Gira, and Chaim Eisen. The platform had one point on foreign policy which called for "friendship" and "strong and unbreakable/inviolable union" between Lithuania and the Soviet Union. The 16-point domestic platform called for democratic freedoms (e.g. freedom of speech, freedom of religion, inviolability of private property), expansion of popular social policies (e.g. tax and debt relief for farmers, wage increases, rent reductions, expansion of medical care), and limited actions against the wealthy (e.g. elimination of bonuses and reduction of inflated wages to high-ranking government officials, elimination of pensions to the wealthy, fight against speculation). The platform dismissed rumors of forced collectivisation and repressions against the Roman Catholic Church as provocations. The platform did not mention anything about Lithuania joining the Soviet Union or any changes to the political system.

This general platform was supplemented by appeals aimed at specific groups (e.g. Jews, teachers, soldiers, peasants). The government also made specific promises. For example, Minister of Agriculture Matas Mickis reassured that there would be no collectivization while the Minister of Finance Juozas Vaišnoras said that the Russian ruble would not replace the Lithuanian litas.

=== Campaign and mass arrests ===
On 6 July, the Union of the Working People of Lithuania organized a large meeting at the Kaunas Sports Hall. The meeting elected its honorary presidium to which it invited Soviet and communist leaders – Joseph Stalin, Vyacheslav Molotov, Kliment Voroshilov, Mikhail Kalinin, Georgi Dimitrov, Ernst Thälmann – as well as the leaders of the Communist Party of Lithuania. After the symbolic gesture, members of the People's Government of Lithuania (acting president Justas Paleckis, Prime Minister Vincas Krėvė-Mickevičius, etc.) as well as local dignitaries were invited to the actual presidium.

Various meetings, rallies, and demonstrations were organized by communist activists across Lithuania to drum up enthusiasm and support for the election. First round of meetings were organized to "select" candidates. The second round of gatherings were organized to express unanimous support for the electoral list. A particularly large gathering was organized on 11 July in Vileišis Square in Kaunas. Speakers praised "Comrade Stalin", Soviet Union, and Red Army and repeated references to the "unbreakable/inviolable union" between Lithuania and the Soviet Union. At the same time, the press increasingly made it clear that those who did not vote in the elections would be considered an "enemy of the people".

On 6 July, Antanas Sniečkus, first secretary of the Communist Party of Lithuania, signed a secret order to "arrest the destructive anti-government element agitating against the People's Government or disrupting the election procedure." According to Soviet reports, 504 people were arrested between 10 and 17 July. Another soviet report categorized the arrested as members of the Lithuanian Nationalist Union (158 people), Polish military officers (148), Voldemarists (31), agents of political police (17), Trotskyists (14), members of the White Army (12), members of the Lithuanian Riflemen's Union (8), agents of foreign intelligence (7), members of the Lithuanian Christian Democratic Party (7), members of the Lithuanian Popular Peasants' Union (4), and other "counter-revolutionaries" (73). These were the first mass-arrests after the Soviet ultimatum of 14 June.

=== Election results ===
The official voting results stated that 1,386,569 persons (95.51% of eligible voters) took part, of which 99.19% voted for the candidates of the Union of the Working People of Lithuania. In many districts, turnout greater than 100% was reported. For example, Panevėžys reported turnout of 106% and Biržai of 123%. Such turnout numbers were explained as "an influx of unregistered voters". Accurate turnout reporting was not even possible as there were no eligible voter lists, only population estimates by Lithuania's statistics department. Lithuanian historian Liudas Truska analyzed surviving records and estimated that the turnout was indeed very high, perhaps around 85%.

While there were no choices in the candidates, voters showed considerable disapproval of the candidates by submitting blank or invalid ballots. Voting records were destroyed, but surviving records from Trakai showed that only two out of nine candidates in the district received more than 50% of the vote. On July 16, Darbo Lietuva (which replaced Lietuvos aidas as the official government newspaper) reported voting results from Švenčionėliai – the most voted-for candidate received 13,830 valid votes (58%) while the lowest voter-for candidate received just 3,900 votes (16%) out of 23,770 voters. Somewhat similar results were also reported from Vilnius city and district on 17 July. However, later that day news agency ELTA announced the official results which claimed 99.19% of the votes for the Union of the Working People of Lithuania. The official voting results for each candidate were never published.

The Union of the Working People of Lithuania faded into obscurity right after the election. The electoral platform was also abandoned in favor of rapid sovietization policies. The union was briefly "resurrected" for a special election to replace the non-existent deputy Jonas Abakonis. On 22 August 1940, Justas Paleckis was the sole candidate proposed by the Union of the Working People of Lithuania in the special elections in Ukmergė. The official results stated that 99.24% of voters voted for Paleckis and that voter turnout reached 91.82%. This allowed Paleckis to become chairman of the presidium of the Supreme Soviet of the Lithuanian SSR, a position he held until 1967.

== Bibliography ==
- Anušauskas, Arvydas (2012). Teroras 1940–1958 m. (in Lithuanian). Versus aureus. ISBN 978-9955-34-346-2.
- Maciuika, Benedict V., ed. (1955). Lithuania in the Last 30 Years. Subcontractor's Monograph HRAF-18 Chicago-8. Human Relations Area Files. OCLC 42414710.
- Maslauskienė, Nijolė (2006). Nusikalstamos okupacinės politikos sistema. Okupacinių politinių ir visuomeninių struktūrų vaidmuo ir kolaboravimas su jomis 1940–1941 m. (PDF) (in Lithuanian). Tarptautinė komisija nacių ir sovietinio okupacinių režimų nusikaltimams Lietuvoje įvertinti.
- Senn, Alfred Erich (2007). Lithuania 1940: Revolution from Above. Rodopi. ISBN 978-9042022256.
