= Valerija Narvydaitė =

Lithuanian communist activist (1896–1970)

Valerija Narvydaitė

Valerija Narvydaitė (5 November 1896 – 5 December 1970) was a Lithuanian communist activist. She was a member of the underground Communist Party of Lithuania (LKP) during the 1920s and 1930s, and spent over 14 years in jails and detention centres. She served as Deputy Minister (Deputy People's Commissar) for Social Welfare of the Lithuanian Soviet Socialist Republic 1940–1941 and 1944–1946.

== Early life and entry into the underground ==
Narvydaitė was born into a peasant family on 5 November 1896 in Meilūnai. Narvydaitė started participating in the revolutionary movement in 1920. She joined the underground Communist Party of Lithuania (LKP) in 1921. She was a member of the LKP Pasvalys Subdistrict Committee 1921–1922 as well as the Panevėžys District Committee of the party. While she was living in Panevėžys, she would often visit Kaunas, travelling by train dressed as a peasant woman and smuggling communist literature. In the underground work, she used code-names such as 'Darbininkė' ('Worker') and 'Lakštingala' ('Nightingale').

== Prisoner ==
Narvydaitė was arrested in March 1922 and imprisoned for four years. After her release, she settled in Kaunas and worked at a knitwear factory. From 1926 to 1929, Narvydaitė operated as a liaison for the LKP Central Committee. She was repeatedly arrested, detained and imprisoned. She was jailed in Šiauliai, Kaunas, Ukmergė, Kretinga, Bajorai, Varniai, Marijampolė and Fort IX. She fell seriously ill during her imprisonment. All in all, she spent over 14 years in jails and detention centres.

== Later Kaunas period ==
During the period of 1938 to 1940, she was again based in Kaunas, conducting communist activities. She was the organizer of the Apartment Tenants Union in Kaunas during those years.

== World War II and establishment of the Lithuanian SSR ==
Narvydaitė was a member of the Supreme Electoral Commission for the 1940 People's Seimas election. She served as Deputy People's Commissar for Social Welfare of the Lithuanian Soviet Socialist Republic in 1940–1941.

For a period in 1942, she served as the deputy representative for the Lithuanian SSR Council of People's Commissars and the Communist Party (Bolsheviks) of Lithuania Central Committee for the evacuated Lithuanians in Ufa (Bashkir ASSR). She again served as Deputy Minister for Social Welfare of the Lithuanian SSR from 1944 until 1946.

== Later life ==
Narvydaitė would later serve in other roles, working with the Vilnius City Executive Committee, as Head of Department of Publishing Houses and Printing Boards and in the apparatus of the Academy of Sciences of the Lithuanian SSR. She retired in 1953, but continued to actively participate in social activities. Narvydaitė died in Vilnius on 5 December 1970, after a long illness.
