= People's Seimas =

People's Seimas Liaudies Seimas
- Lithuanian SSR

Type
- Type: Supreme Soviet (officially); Rubber stamp legislature (de facto)

History
- Established: July 1940
- Disbanded: August 1940
- Preceded by: Fourth Seimas of Lithuania
- Succeeded by: Supreme Soviet of the Lithuanian SSR

Elections
- Last election: 1940 (Rigged)

Meeting place
- Kaunas

The People's Seimas (Lithuanian: Liaudies Seimas) was a puppet legislature organized in order to give legal sanction to the occupation and annexation of Lithuania by the Soviet Union. After the Soviet ultimatum in June 1940, a new pro-Soviet government was formed, known as the People's Government. The new government dismissed the Fourth Seimas and announced elections to the People's Seimas. The elections were heavily rigged, and resulted in a chamber composed entirely of Communists and Communist sympathizers (the electorate had no choice as 79 candidates were offered to the 79 seats). The new parliament unanimously adopted a resolution proclaiming the Lithuanian Soviet Socialist Republic and petitioned for admission to the Soviet Union as a constituent republic. The Supreme Soviet of the USSR accepted the Lithuanian petition on 3 August 1940. The People's Seimas adopted a new constitution, a close copy of the 1936 Soviet Constitution, on 25 August and renamed itself to the Supreme Soviet of the Lithuanian SSR.

According to Lithuanian and Western sources, these events were merely a cover to create an illusion of constitutional legitimacy of the forcible Soviet occupation. When Lithuania declared its independence in 1990, it argued that it did not need to follow the process of secession from the Soviet Union outlined in the Soviet constitution. It took the line that the actions of the People's Seimas—and indeed, the entire process of annexation—violated both Lithuanian and international law, and it was merely reasserting an independence that legally still existed. According to Soviet sources, the election of the People's Seimas marked the culmination of a socialist revolution that the Lithuanian people had carried out independent of Moscow's influence. Thus, according to the Soviet line, the People's Seimas—as did legislatures elected under similar circumstances in Estonia and Latvia—represented the legitimate will of the Lithuanian people to join the Soviet Union.

== Background ==
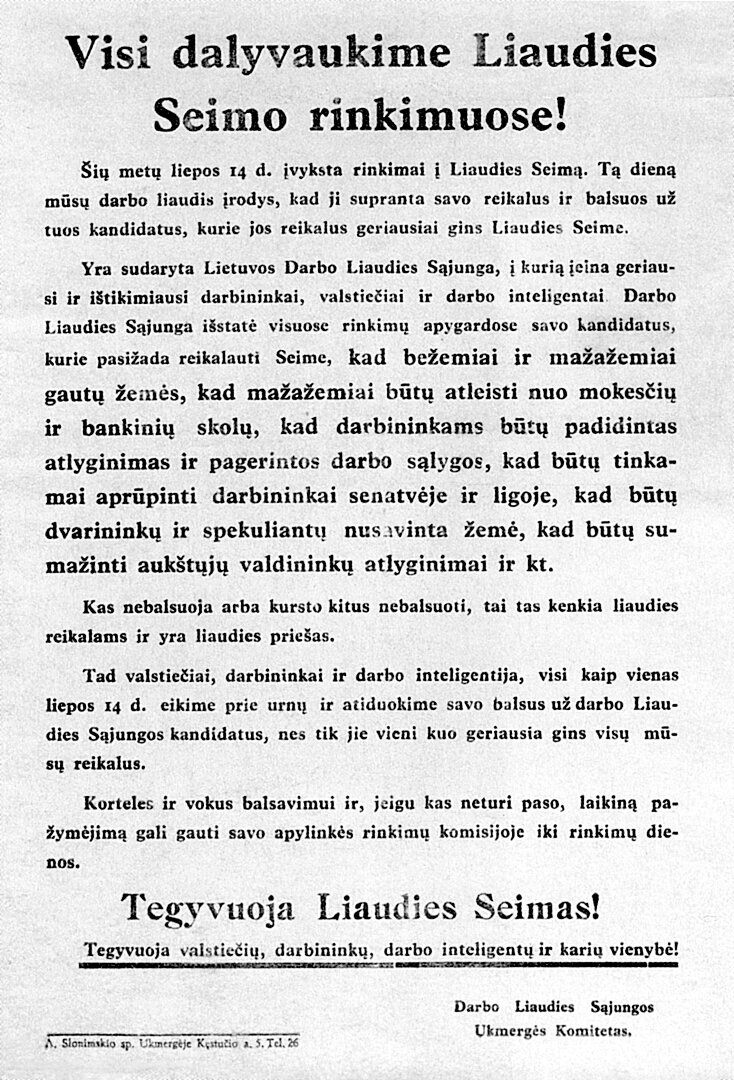
People's Seimas election poster in which those who do not vote or urge others not to vote are called enemies of the people

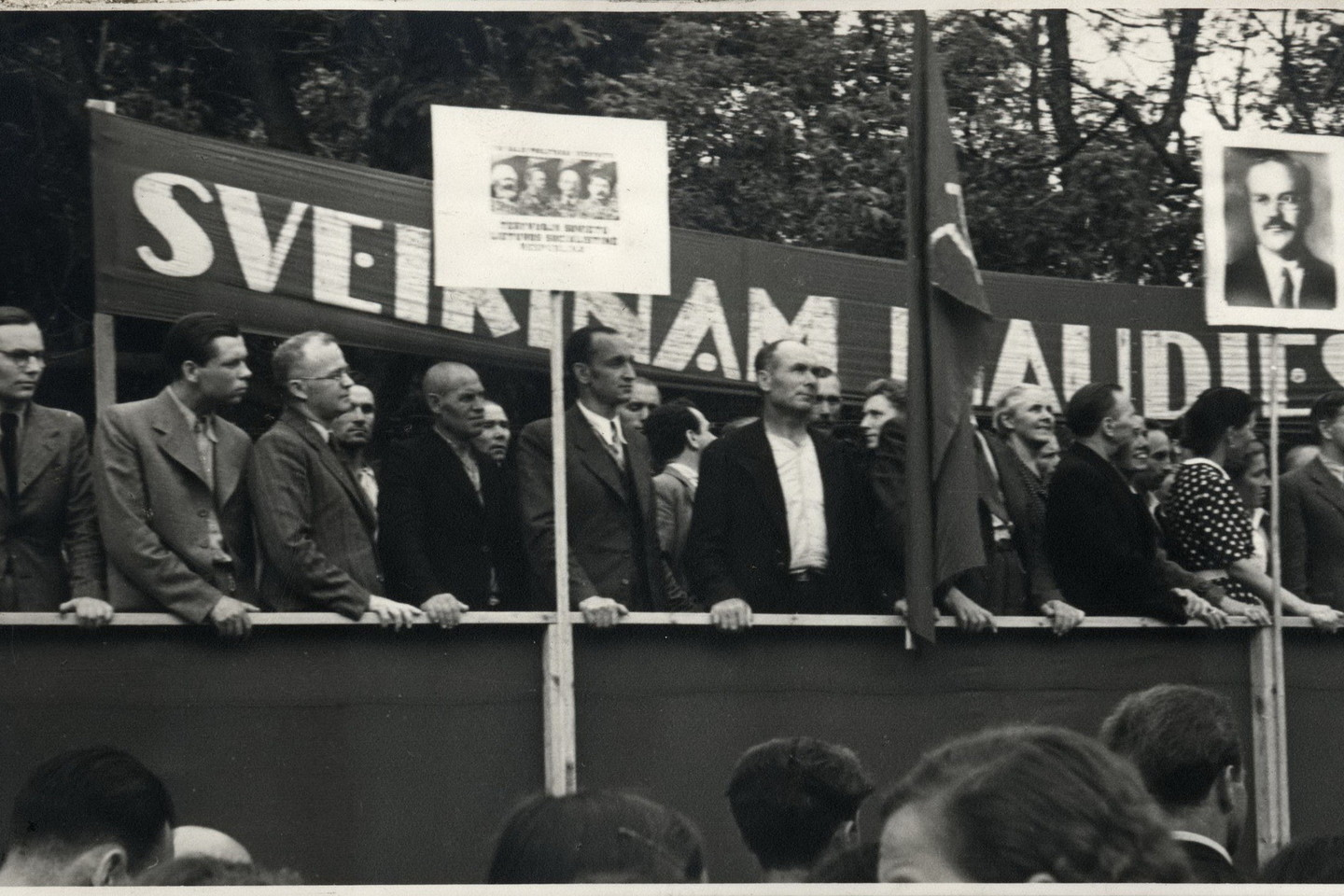
Members of the People's Seimas during a support rally of its resolutions

According to the German–Soviet Boundary and Friendship Treaty, Lithuania was assigned to the Soviet sphere of influence. Almost immediately Lithuanian diplomats were invited to Moscow for negotiations. The Soviets proposed the Soviet–Lithuanian Mutual Assistance Treaty: Lithuania would receive a portion of Vilnius Region in exchange for Soviet bases within Lithuania. Similar pacts were already signed with Latvia and Estonia. Finland rejected a similar proposal and the Soviets started the Winter War which delayed the occupation of the Baltic States. After the Winter War was over and Germany was winning the Battle of France, the Soviets heightened their propaganda, accusing Lithuania of abducting its soldiers from the bases in Lithuania and conspiring with Latvia and Estonia against the Soviet Union. On 14 June 1940, the Soviet Union issued an ultimatum to Lithuania, demanding to form a new pro-Soviet government and to allow an unspecified number of the Red Army soldiers to enter Lithuanian territory.

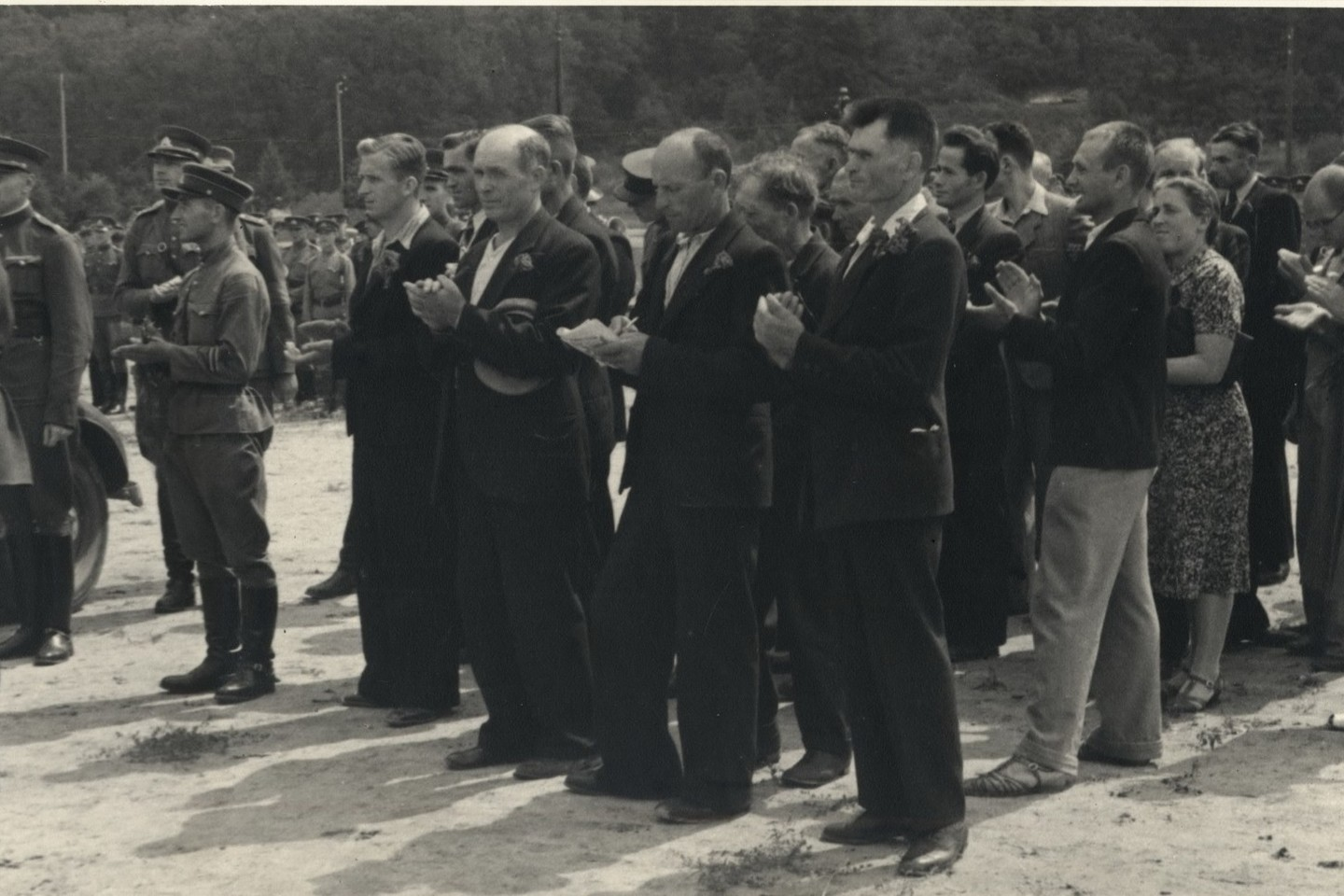
Members of the People's Seimas meeting with soldiers of the Lithuanian People's Army in July 1940

Lithuania accepted the ultimatum and on 15 June, the Red Army entered Lithuania unopposed. People's Commissar for Foreign Affairs Vladimir Dekanozov arrived to supervise the process of the annexation of Lithuania.

President Antanas Smetona opposed the occupation, and fled the country in protest. Before his departure, he turned over his powers on an interim basis to Prime Minister Antanas Merkys, who stood next in the line of succession under the 1938 Constitution. On 16 June, Merkys announced on a national radio broadcast that he had deposed Smetona and was now president in his own right.

Merkys appointed a new pro-Soviet government, headed by left-wing journalist Justas Paleckis, which later became known as the People's Government. Merkys resigned two days later at the behest of the Soviets, leaving Paleckis as acting president. Writer Vincas Krėvė-Mickevičius became the new Prime Minister. For all intents and purposes, Lithuania had lost its independence.

Lithuania's official position since 1990 has been that Merkys' usurpation of the presidency was illegal and unconstitutional, since Smetona never resigned. Therefore, Lithuania contends that all subsequent actions leading up to the Soviet annexation were ipso facto void.

On 27 June, Paleckis dissolved the Fourth Seimas of Lithuania, citing the Constitution of 1938.

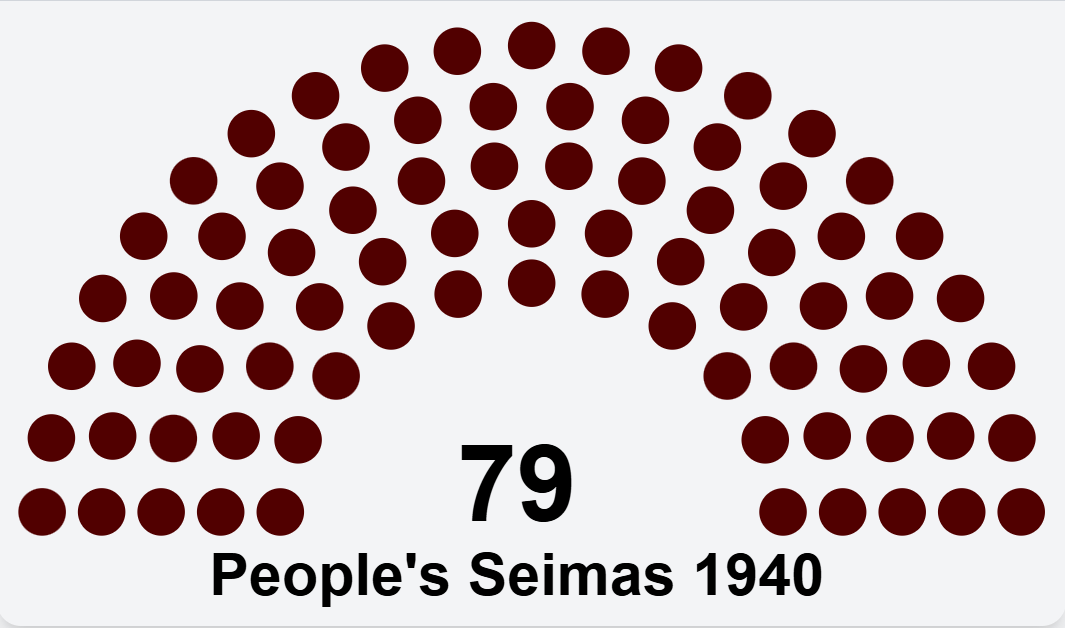

== Elections ==
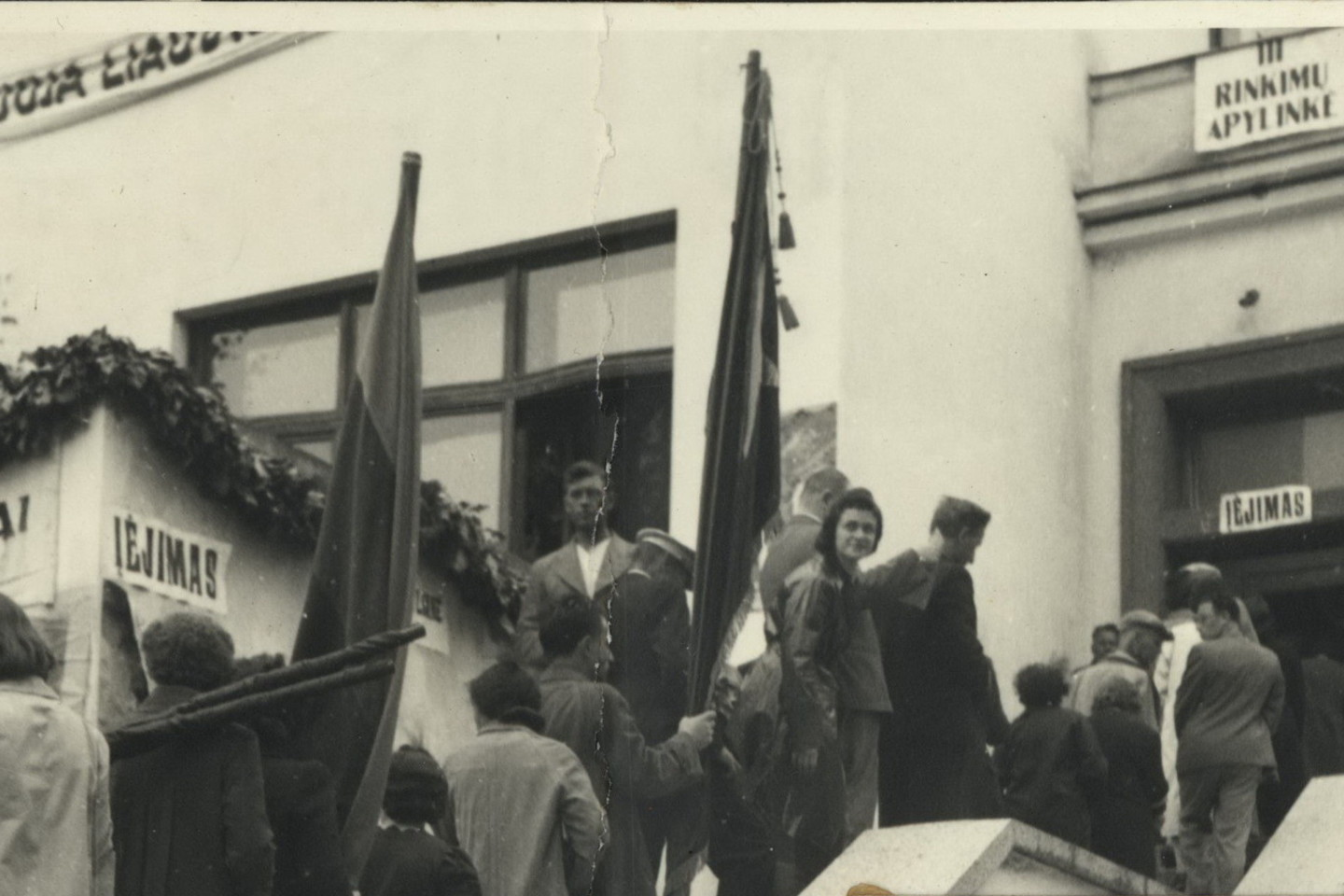
Rigged elections to the People's Seimas in Kaunas in 1940

On 1 July, the Paleckis government announced elections to a new parliament, the People's Seimas, to be held on 14 July. The Communist Party of Lithuania emerged from underground with 1,500 members after the Soviet invasion. Soon afterward, the government announced the formation of the Union of the Working People of Lithuania (Lithuanian: Lietuvos liaudies darbo sąjunga), ostensibly a popular front. Voters were presented with a single list of candidates, including some non-Communists. No other organizations were allowed to participate. On 11 and 12 July, the Soviet authorities reduced the possible points of opposition by arresting leading figures of the old regime and deporting some of them to the interior of the Soviet Union – even though Lithuania was still formally an independent state. Later elections were extended into 15 July. Each voter had his or her passport stamped after voting. According to the official results, voter turnout reached 95 percents. Most of the original election records were destroyed. The remaining bits show that turnout was indeed high, but many ballots were invalid (missing, destroyed, left blank, or marked with anti-Soviet slogans). The Union list received over 99% of the votes, a total that was announced even before the polls closed—classic signs of massive election fraud.

== Annexation ==
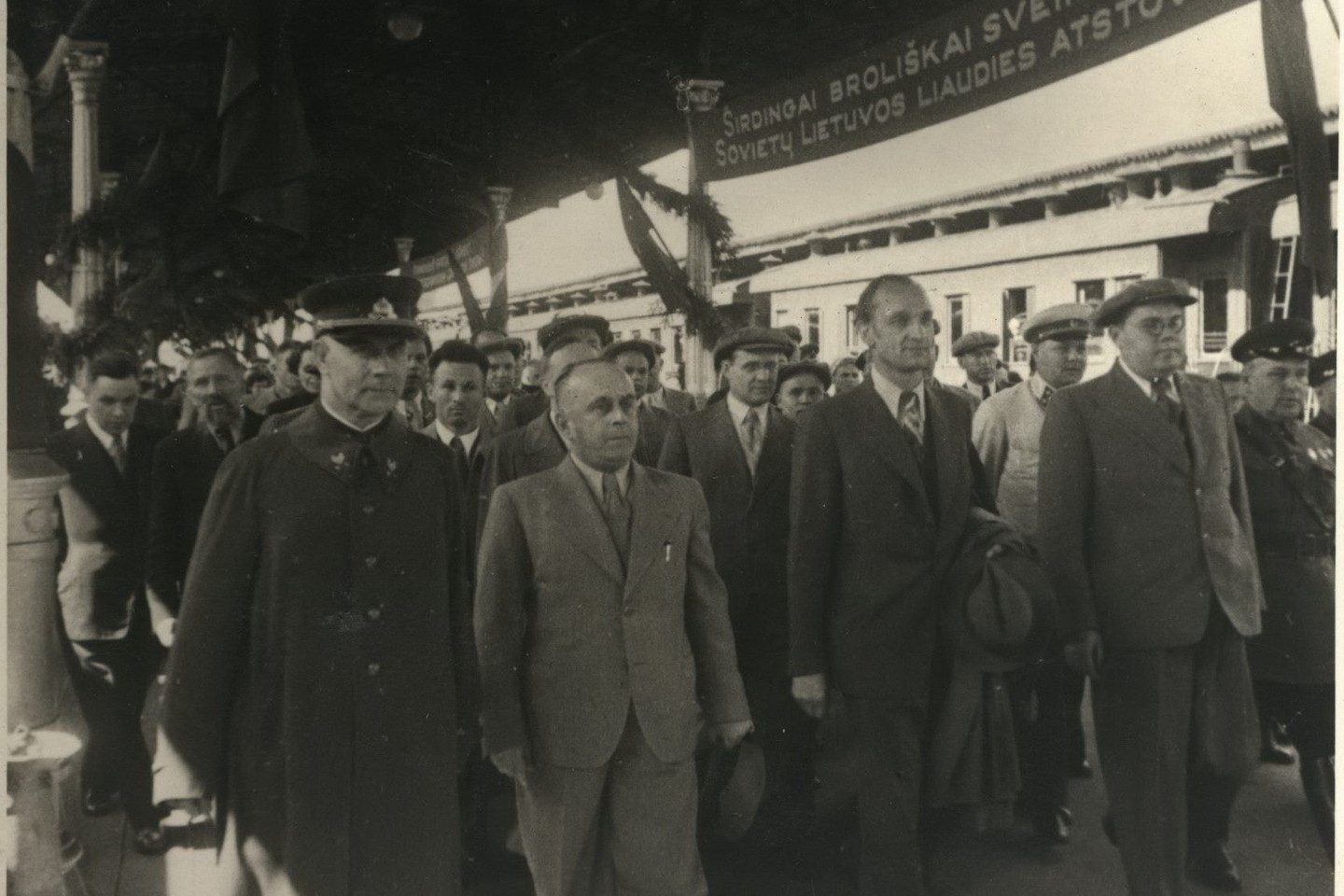
Members of the Authorized Commission of the People's Seimas in Moscow in 1940

The People's Seimas met on 21 July 1940. Its sole order of business was a resolution creating the Lithuanian Soviet Socialist Republic and requesting the Soviet Union to admit Lithuania into the Union. This resolution was passed by acclamation. Twenty representatives were to deliver the declaration to the Supreme Soviet of the USSR: acting President Justas Paleckis, Minister of the Interior Mečys Gedvilas, Minister of Agriculture Matas Mickis, Minister of Education Antanas Venclova, Minister of Defence and Commander of the Army Vincas Vitkauskas, former priest and chief control inspector Liudas Adomauskas, chairman of the trade unions Motiejus Šumauskas, Communist Party activists Karolis Didžiulis-Grosmanas and Icikas Meskupas-Adomas, writers Liudas Gira and Petras Cvirka, poet Salomėja Nėris, Palanga mayor Stasė Vaineikienė, soldier Viktoras Ditkevičius, farmers Juozas Demskis and Birutė Abdulskaitė, workers Kazys and Pranas Petrauskas, Pranas Zibertas, and Marija Kutraitė. Each member of the delegation received 5,000 litas payment for their signatures, which was a substantial sum for that time.

The Soviet Union approved the Lithuanian resolution on 3 August and the People's Seimas declared itself the provisional Supreme Soviet of the Lithuanian SSR.
