= Soviet ultimatum to Lithuania =

1940 demand of the Soviet Union

Comparison of planned and actual territorial changes in the Molotov–Ribbentrop Pact (click on the image for higher resolution). Soviet sphere of influence and territorial acquisitions are in orange.

The Soviet Union issued an ultimatum to Lithuania before midnight of 14 June 1940. The Soviets, using a formal pretext, demanded that an unspecified number of Soviet soldiers be allowed to enter the Lithuanian territory and that a new pro-Soviet government (later known as the "People's Government") be formed. The ultimatum and subsequent incorporation of Lithuania into the Soviet Union stemmed from the division of Eastern Europe into the German and Soviet spheres of influence agreed in the Molotov–Ribbentrop Pact of August 1939. Lithuania, along with Latvia and Estonia, fell into the Soviet sphere. According to the Soviet–Lithuanian Mutual Assistance Treaty of October 1939, Lithuania agreed to allow some 20,000 Soviets troops to be stationed at bases within Lithuania in exchange for receiving a portion of the Vilnius Region (previously Polish territory). Further Soviet actions to establish its dominance in its sphere of influence were delayed by the Winter War with Finland and resumed in spring 1940 when Germany was making rapid advances in western Europe. Despite the threat to the country's independence, Lithuanian authorities did little to plan for contingencies and were unprepared for the ultimatum.

With Soviet troops already stationed in the country in accordance with to the Mutual Assistance Treaty, it was impossible to mount effective military resistance. On 15 June, Lithuania unconditionally accepted the ultimatum and lost its independence. The Soviets sought to show the world that this was not a military occupation and annexation, but a socialist revolution initiated by the local population demanding to join the Soviet Union. In conformity with this, the Soviets followed semi-legal procedures; they took control of the governmental institutions, installed a puppet government, and carried out show elections to the People's Seimas. During its first session, the Seimas proclaimed the creation of the Lithuanian Soviet Socialist Republic and petitioned to be admitted into the Soviet Union. The petition was officially accepted by the Supreme Soviet of the Soviet Union on 3 August 1940. At the same time, almost identical processes took place in Latvia and Estonia. Lithuania would not regain its independence until the proclamation of the Act of the Re-Establishment of the State of Lithuania on 11 March 1990.

== Background ==
The Baltic states of Lithuania, Latvia, and Estonia were part of the Russian Empire during the 19th century, achieving independence in the aftermath of World War I. The rise of Nazi Germany during the 1930s created Soviet fears of a German invasion, further aggravated by German expansion to the East, such as the ultimatum to Lithuania in March 1939, as a result of which the nation was forced to cede its most industrially developed region, Klaipėda, to the Reich.

The Soviet Union signed the Molotov–Ribbentrop Pact with Germany in August 1939, in part as an attempt to delay the possibility of invasion. Germany shortly initiated World War II by invading Poland on 1 September. Lithuania at first was found to be in Nazi Germany's sphere of influence according to the secret protocol of Molotov–Ribbentrop Pact, but later, the German–Soviet Boundary and Friendship Treaty of 28 September divided large portions of northeastern Europe between the two powers, and assigned Lithuania to the Soviet sphere of influence. A Lithuanian delegation was invited to Moscow, where it signed the Soviet–Lithuanian Mutual Assistance Treaty on 10 October 1939. According to the treaty, the Soviet Union would cede a portion of the Vilnius Region, including the important city of Vilnius, which it had gained during the invasion of Poland, to Lithuania in exchange for the right to station up to 20,000 (the original bargaining point was 50,000) Soviet troops in Lithuania on a permanent basis. Official Soviet sources claimed that the presence of the Soviet military was necessary to strengthen defenses of a weak nation against possible attacks by Nazi Germany. In reality, it was the first step toward the eventual occupation of Lithuania and was described by The New York Times as a "virtual sacrifice of independence."

According to the Soviet–Lithuanian Mutual Assistance Treaty, Lithuania agreed to allow Soviet military bases (marked in black stars) in exchange for a portion of the Vilnius Region (in orange)

Despite the pacts, the Soviet Union's fears continued. Russian military theorists had long held that control of the Baltic Sea was crucial to the defense of St. Petersburg, the Soviet Union's second-largest city, and the Baltic states offered a buffer zone between the Soviet Union and Germany. Pursuing this strategy, the Soviet Union initiated the Winter War in Finland after the country rejected a similar Moscow-offered mutual assistance treaty. Stalin was unnerved by German successes in Europe, since they had taken Denmark, Norway, the Netherlands, Belgium, and Luxembourg by spring of 1940. According to Nikita Khrushchev, after the fall of France in May, Joseph Stalin expressed the concern that Adolf Hitler would 'beat our brains in'.

The political situation in Lithuania, however, remained stable between October 1939 and March 1940. The Soviets did not interfere with Lithuania's domestic affairs and the Soviet soldiers were well-behaved in their bases. As late as 29 March 1940, Foreign Minister Vyacheslav Molotov delivered a speech before the Supreme Soviet of the Soviet Union expressing his satisfaction with the execution of the mutual assistance treaties with Lithuania, Latvia, and Estonia. While Lithuanian politicians publicly praised the Soviet Union for its generosity and touted the "traditional Soviet–Lithuanian friendship", in private, they understood this treaty was a serious threat to Lithuanian independence. The popular attitude was reflected in the slogan "Vilnius – mūsų, Lietuva – rusų" (Vilnius is ours, but Lithuania is Russia's).

The Lithuanian government had been debating its options and discussing the possibility of occupation since November 1939. At that time, the Lithuanian envoys Stasys Lozoraitis, Petras Klimas, and Bronius Kazys Balutis prepared a memorandum containing contingency plans. They advised strengthening the army, depositing funds abroad, reinforcing the 1934 Baltic Entente alliance with Latvia and Estonia, and investigating the establishment of a government-in-exile. Although various resolutions were forwarded, nothing tangible was accomplished. During winter 1940, the Baltic Entente nations discussed greater cooperation. Mindful of their circumstances, the three governments worded their communications carefully, but the talks would be used as evidence that Lithuania was conspiring with Latvia and Estonia in violation of the mutual assistance treaty.

== Rising tension ==
=== Initial accusations ===
Tensions between the Soviet Union and Lithuania escalated along with Germany's successes. By mid-March 1940, the Winter War with Finland was over and the Soviets could concentrate their attention on gaining control of the Baltic states. In April, after Germany occupied Denmark, a Lithuanian envoy in Moscow reported rising hostility from Soviet diplomats. During May, while the Battle of France was in full swing, the Soviets intensified their rhetoric and diplomatic pressure. On 16 May, shortly after the German invasion of Luxembourg, Belgium, and the Netherlands, Soviet official newspaper Izvestia published an article warning that it was naive for a small country to attempt neutrality while giants were fighting for survival. Between 18 and 25 May, Soviet soldiers moved some military equipment from Vilnius to Gaižiūnai, a location much closer to the government seat in Kaunas. The action's proximity to the then-capital carried symbolic weight.

On 25 May, the day before the Dunkirk evacuation, Soviet Foreign Minister Vyacheslav Molotov presented a diplomatic note that accused the Lithuanian government of abducting three Soviet soldiers stationed in Lithuania in accordance with the terms of the mutual assistance treaty. The note alleged that two soldiers had been tortured to obtain Soviet military secrets but managed to escape, and that the third, Butayev, was murdered. Earlier in May, Butayev had deserted his unit and was searched by the Lithuanian police. When found, he committed suicide. The Lithuanian government replied that the accusations were baseless, but promised a full investigation of the incident and convened a special commission. However, the commission's requests for detailed information, including interviews, photographs, physical descriptions, or other data that could further the investigation, went unanswered. The official Soviet stance was that Lithuania needed to carry out the investigation on its own and that its requests were an attempt to shift responsibility to the Soviets.

=== Direct negotiations ===
On 30 May, the accusations were restated, in an official communique, published by TASS, the official Soviet news agency. The same day, Stasys Lozoraitis—the Lithuanian envoy in Rome—was authorized to form a government in exile in case of the Soviet occupation. The Lithuanian police tightened security around Soviet bases and arrested 272 suspicious individuals, but that only drew additional criticism of harassment. Foreign Minister Juozas Urbšys offered to settle the matter in direct negotiations in Moscow. Molotov agreed to talk, but only with Prime Minister Antanas Merkys. On 7 June, Merkys arrived in Moscow. The Soviets repeated the accusations of kidnapping. Other charges were leveled, including the allegation that Minister of the Interior Kazys Skučas and Director of State Security Department Augustinas Povilaitis had provoked Soviet soldiers. During the second meeting on 9 June, Molotov also accused the Lithuanian government of conspiring with Latvia and Estonia to establish a secret military union (in reference to the Baltic Entente), thereby violating the mutual assistance pact.

On 10 June, the Lithuanian government discussed the new developments. It decided that Merkys should return to Kaunas and Urbšys should deliver a note offering withdrawal from the Baltic Entente, a full investigation of the incident, and dismissal of Skučas and Povilaitis. A personal letter from President Antanas Smetona to Chairman of Presidium of the Supreme Soviet Mikhail Kalinin repeated assurances that Lithuania always honored the mutual assistance pact. The third and final meeting between Merkys, Urbšys, and Molotov on 11 June brought no resolution. The Soviets continued to press charges which the Lithuanians could not meaningfully answer and made no more actionable requests. On 12 June, Merkys returned to Lithuania and informed the government of the situation. It was decided that Skučas should resign and Povilaitis would be immediately dismissed. The Lithuanian Army was ordered to be alert, but no orders were issued regarding mobilization or preparedness. Lithuanian politicians did not fully understand the gravity of the situation and did not think the results would be catastrophic. Urbšys reported that the Soviets strongly disapproved of Merkys and his cabinet; he suggested that a new government be installed, possibly led by Stasys Raštikis, former Commander-in-Chief of the Lithuanian Army. Such suggestion interfered with Lithuania's domestic affairs.

=== Internal crisis ===
While Merkys and Urbšys negotiated in Moscow, the Lithuanian opposition saw an opportunity to unseat the authoritarian regime of Smetona and his Lithuanian Nationalist Union. On 12 June, the Christian Democrats and the Peasant Popular Union met and decided to ask Kazys Bizauskas and Juozas Audėnas to resign from the cabinet, expecting that these resignations would trigger a government crisis. The opposition saw Soviet pressure as a means of ousting Smetona's regime, restoring democracy, and preserving some form of autonomy. The opposition also hoped to persuade Merkys, who had just returned from Moscow, to resign along with the rest of the cabinet. However, Merkys could not be found—he was apparently resting at his estate near Kaunas. This episode was harshly criticized afterwards as an illustration of several weaknesses in the Lithuanian government; it underestimated the threat posed by the Soviet Union, it was disoriented during the crisis, and its members focused on party interests rather than national priorities. Algirdas Julien Greimas later described the opposition's actions as a "joyful dance next to the corpse of the lost state".

=== Military movements ===
Mobilization of the Red Army had begun before the last round of meetings in Moscow. On 7 June, the Army was ordered to prepare for an attack against Lithuania. As of 5 June, all Soviet forces in the Baltic region were assigned to command of Semyon Timoshenko, People's Commissar for Defense. The Soviets gathered their forces on Lithuania's eastern border in modern-day Belarus; they consisted of five divisions and supporting units from the 3rd and the 11th Armies. The armies included 221,260 soldiers, operating 1,140 airplanes and 1,513 tanks. Lithuania already housed 18,786 Soviet troops within its territory. At the time, the Lithuanian Army consisted of 28,005 troops and it owned 118 planes. The Soviets readied hospitals for the wounded and prisoner-of-war camps. On 11 June, under the command of General Dmitry Pavlov, the Soviets finalized their attack plan and assigned specific tasks to all units. The orders were to cross the border silently, use bayonets as gunshots would be noticed, and to maneuver around defensive forces in order to occupy the territory more quickly. The Soviets expected to take control of the entire territory in three to four days.

On the night of 14 June, while the Lithuanian government was discussing the ultimatum, Soviet soldiers began actions at the border. They fired shots at a border post near Alytus and killed policeman Aleksas Barauskas. At other points, the Soviets interrogated Lithuanian border guards and harassed civilians, hoping to provoke a retaliation that would serve as a rationale for a full-scale military attack.

== Ultimatum and acceptance ==
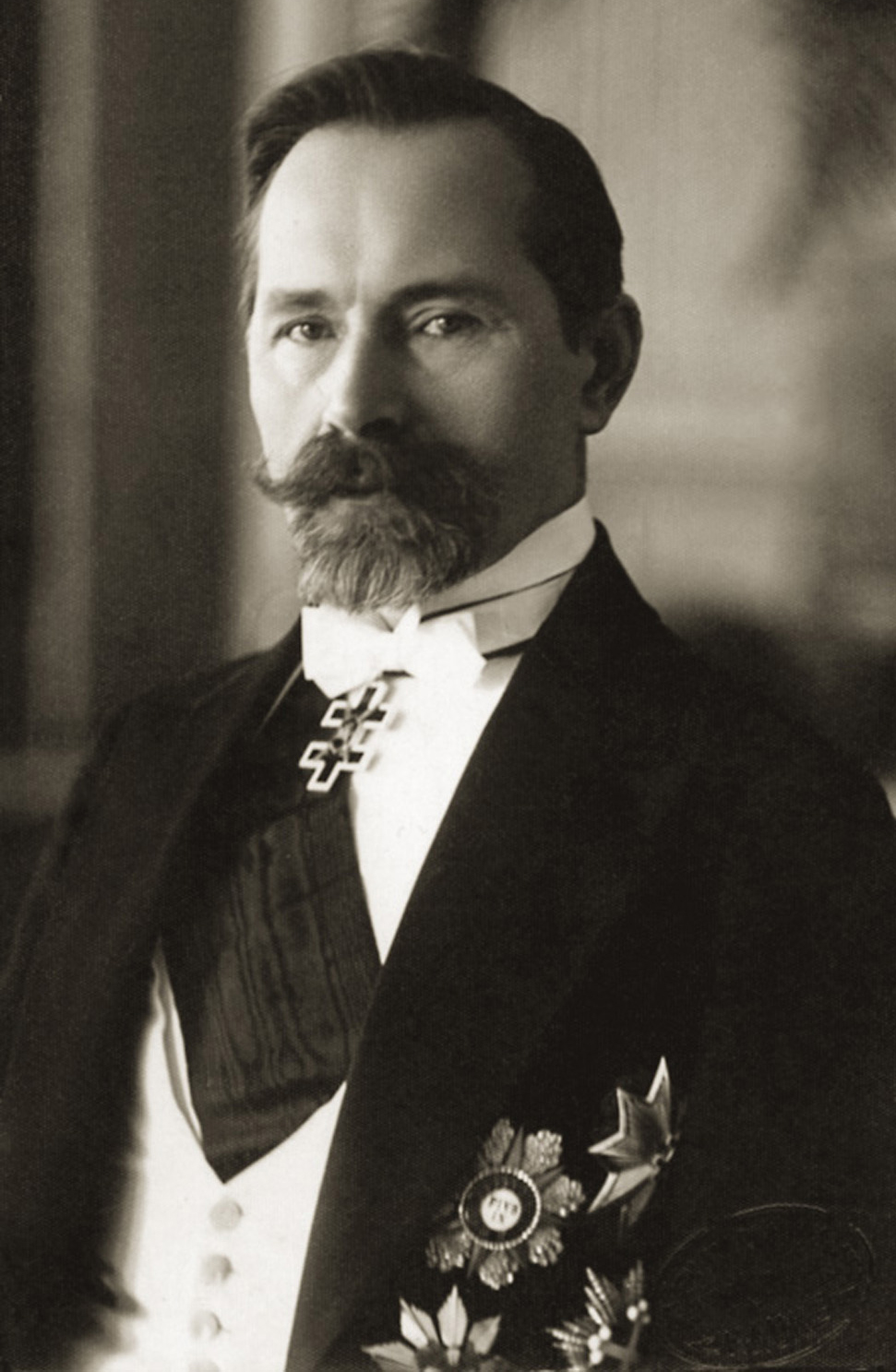
Lithuanian President Antanas Smetona fled the country shortly after acceptance of the ultimatum

Just before midnight on 14 June, while the world was focused on the imminent capitulation of Paris, Molotov presented the ultimatum to Urbšys in Moscow. It reiterated the earlier charges of kidnapping Soviet soldiers and conspiracy with Latvia and Estonia. The ultimatum demanded:

1. That Skučas and Povilaitis be put on trial for ordering the Soviet soldiers to be kidnapped;
2. That a government, more capable of adhering to the Mutual Assistance Pact, be formed;
3. That an unspecified, but "sufficiently large" number of Soviet troops be allowed to enter Lithuanian territory;
4. That an answer be given by 10:00 am the next morning.

The Lithuanian government—given less than 12 hours to respond—debated the ultimatum during the night session. It was clear that no matter how the government responded, the Soviet army would invade Lithuania. President Antanas Smetona agreed only with the demand to form a new government, and argued for military resistance, even if it were symbolic. Merkys and his deputy Kazys Bizauskas urged acceptance. Soviet troops were stationed in Lithuania since October 1939 and acted honorably – the Soviets would surely continue to be reasonable. Bizauskas, a member of the opposition, saw the ultimatum as an opportunity to get rid of the Smetona regime. Historians cited his attitudes to illustrate his incomprehension of the dire situation. Raštikis, as the potential head of a new government, was invited to the meeting. Both former and current Chief Military Commanders Raštikis and Vincas Vitkauskas reported that mounting an effective armed resistance, when Soviet troops were already in the country and the Lithuanian military was not mobilized, was impossible. The government also rejected a diplomatic protest. In Raštikis' view, such actions were empty and would do no more than anger the Soviets and Urbšys, calling from Moscow, urged not to needlessly antagonize the Soviets. Merkys and his cabinet resigned to make way for a new government led by Raštikis. The session ended at 7 am with a decision to accept all Soviet demands without expressing protest or complaint.

By noon, the Lithuanians received a reply from Moscow stating that Raštikis was not a suitable candidate for Prime Minister. The selection of another candidate would be supervised by Molotov's deputy Vladimir Dekanozov. Merkys continued to act as Prime Minister. Smetona, who continued to disagree with the majority of his government, decided to leave the country in protest and appointed Merkys as acting president. By late evening on 15 June, Smetona and Minister of Defense Kazys Musteikis reached Kybartai and crossed the border into Germany, where they were granted temporary asylum. The Lithuanian guards did not allow them to pass; thus, Smetona had to wade across the shallow Liepona rivulet. Smetona's departure worked to the Soviets′ advantage; its indignity opened him to ridicule and they were able to exploit the sentiments against him without fearing that he would be seen as a martyr. By fleeing, Smetona escaped the fate of Latvian President Kārlis Ulmanis and Estonian President Konstantin Päts, who were manipulated by the Soviets and later arrested. Under the Lithuanian constitution, Merkys became acting president.

The Red Army was scheduled to enter Lithuanian territory from three separate directions at 3:00 pm and had orders to take control of Vilnius, Kaunas, Raseiniai, Panevėžys, and Šiauliai. The Lithuanian Army was ordered not to resist and to extend friendly greetings; its air force was ordered to remain on the ground. The Soviets came in great numbers, clogging Lithuanian roads. They had an obvious intention to show power and intimidate any resistance. Writer Ignas Šeinius claimed that he observed the same squadron of Soviet planes making the same flight over and over again to create an impression of much larger Soviet Air Forces.

On 16 June, nearly identical ultimata were issued to Latvia and Estonia, although they were given only eight hours to respond. With Lithuania already in Soviet hands, armed resistance in Latvia or Estonia was even more futile. All three states were occupied and lost their independence until 1991.

== Aftermath ==
=== Legitimization of the occupation ===
One of Dekanozov's primary goals was the organization of a puppet government that would legitimize the occupation. On 16 June, the Lithuanian government, exceeding its authority, decided that Smetona's emigration was in effect a resignation and granted Merkys full presidential powers. On 17 June, Merkys appointed Justas Paleckis the new Prime Minister and confirmed the new government, known as the People's Government. Merkys and Urbšys then resigned; both would later be arrested and deported to Russia. Paleckis assumed the presidency and appointed writer Vincas Krėvė-Mickevičius as Prime Minister. The People's Government included several well-known politicians and public figures to reassure the public that the new government was not a tool of Soviet occupation, but a simple replacement of the authoritarian Smetona regime. Since there had been strong opposition to Smetona's rule, it was interpreted by some Lithuanians as a destruction of presidential power rather than as a loss of independence.

On 1 July, the People's Government dissolved the Fourth Seimas of Lithuania and announced a show election for a "People's Seimas" to be held on 14 July. A new electoral law was adopted on 5 July. The law, in violation of the constitution, specified that only one candidate could stand for each seat available in the parliament. It was also worded in such a way to effectively limit the field to the Lithuanian Communist Party and its supporters. The official fraudulent results showed a voter turnout of 95.51% and support of 99.19% to the communist delegates. Officially, however, 39 of the elected delegates were Communists and 40 were independents. During its first session on 21 July, the parliament proclaimed the creation of the Lithuanian Soviet Socialist Republic and petitioned the Supreme Soviet of the Soviet Union to accept this new republic into the Union. A 20-member Lithuanian delegation presented the case for incorporation in Moscow on 1 August. The petition was accepted on 3 August, and Lithuania became the 14th republic of the Soviet Union.

=== Sovietization of Lithuania ===
Immediately after the occupation, the new government began implementing political, economic, and social Sovietization policies. On 1 July, all cultural and religious organizations were closed. The Communist Party of Lithuania—with some 1,500 members,—and its youth branch were designated the only legitimate political entities. Before the elections to the People's Seimas, the Soviets arrested about 2,000 of the most prominent political activists. These arrests paralyzed the opposition. The repressions continued and intensified. An estimated 12,000 individuals were imprisoned as "enemies of the people" during the year following the annexation. Between 14 and 18 June 1941, less than a week before the Nazi invasion, some 17,000 Lithuanians were deported to Siberia, where many perished due to inhumane living conditions (see June deportation).

All banks (including all accounts holding over 1,000 litas), real estate holdings larger than 170 m^{2} (1,800 sq ft), and private enterprises employing over 20 workers or grossing more than 150,000 litas were nationalized. This disruption in management and operations created a sharp drop in production. The Lithuanian litas was artificially depreciated by three to four times less than its actual value and withdrawn by March 1941. The drop in production, combined with massive spending of appreciated roubles by Soviet soldiers and officials, caused widespread shortages. All land was nationalized; the largest farms were reduced to 30 ha (74 acres), and extra land (some 575,000 ha (1,420,000 acres)) was distributed to small farmers. To turn small peasants against large landowners, collectivization was not immediately introduced in Lithuania. In preparation for eventual collectivization, farm taxes were increased by 50–200% and additional heavy in-kind conscriptions were enacted. Some farmers were unable to pay the exorbitant new taxes, and about 1,100 of the larger ones were put on trial.

=== German occupation ===
On 22 June 1941, Nazi Germany invaded the Soviet Union and within a week, took control of all Lithuania. At first, the Germans were greeted as liberators from the oppressive Soviet regime. The Lithuanians hoped that the Germans would re-establish their independence or at least allow some degree of autonomy (similar to the Slovak Republic). Organized by the Lithuanian Activist Front (LAF), Lithuanians rose in the anti-Soviet and pro-Nazi June Uprising, established the short-lived Provisional Government, and declared independence. However, the Germans did not recognize the Provisional Government and established their own civil administration, the Reichskommissariat Ostland. When the Red Army regained control of Lithuania in summer 1944 – January 1945, the Lithuanian partisans began an armed struggle against the second Soviet occupation. An estimated 30,000 partisans and partisan supporters were killed during the guerrilla warfare between 1944 and 1953.

== Impacts and evaluation ==
While unsuccessful, the June Uprising demonstrated that many Lithuanians were determined to be independent. Lithuania became disillusioned with the Nazi regime and organized resistance, notably the Supreme Committee for the Liberation of Lithuania, but the Soviet Union remained "Public Enemy Number One." A Lithuanian perception that Jewish Bolshevism was involved in the occupation strengthened antisemitic attitudes and contributed to Lithuanian participation in the Holocaust.

The acceptance of the ultimatum remains highly controversial in Lithuania. Observers criticized the Lithuanian Army, which had been consuming some 20% of the state budget, for not staging even a symbolic resistance, which would have invalidated Soviet claims that the takeover was a "socialist revolution" and a legitimate change of government. Others criticized the government for inaction: it had eight months in which to create contingency plans. Barring armed resistance, diplomatic options remained — the Lithuanian government could have rejected the ultimatum, retreated abroad, and formed a recognized government-in-exile. Historian Alfonsas Eidintas points to a lack of public comprehension of the risk. Negative news about the Soviets was censored and even politicians did not believe the ultimatum would mean a complete loss of independence. Another debate centers on the lack of bloodshed. By accepting the ultimatum, the government may have avoided loss of life at the time, but its submission may also have encouraged later Soviet repression. Russia, the primary successor state of the Soviet Union, continues to dispute whether the events surrounding the ultimatum and the subsequent years that Lithuania spent as a Soviet Socialist Republic constituted an occupation.

== See also ==
- Vladimir Putin's December 2021 ultimatum
