= Skapiškis =

- Town
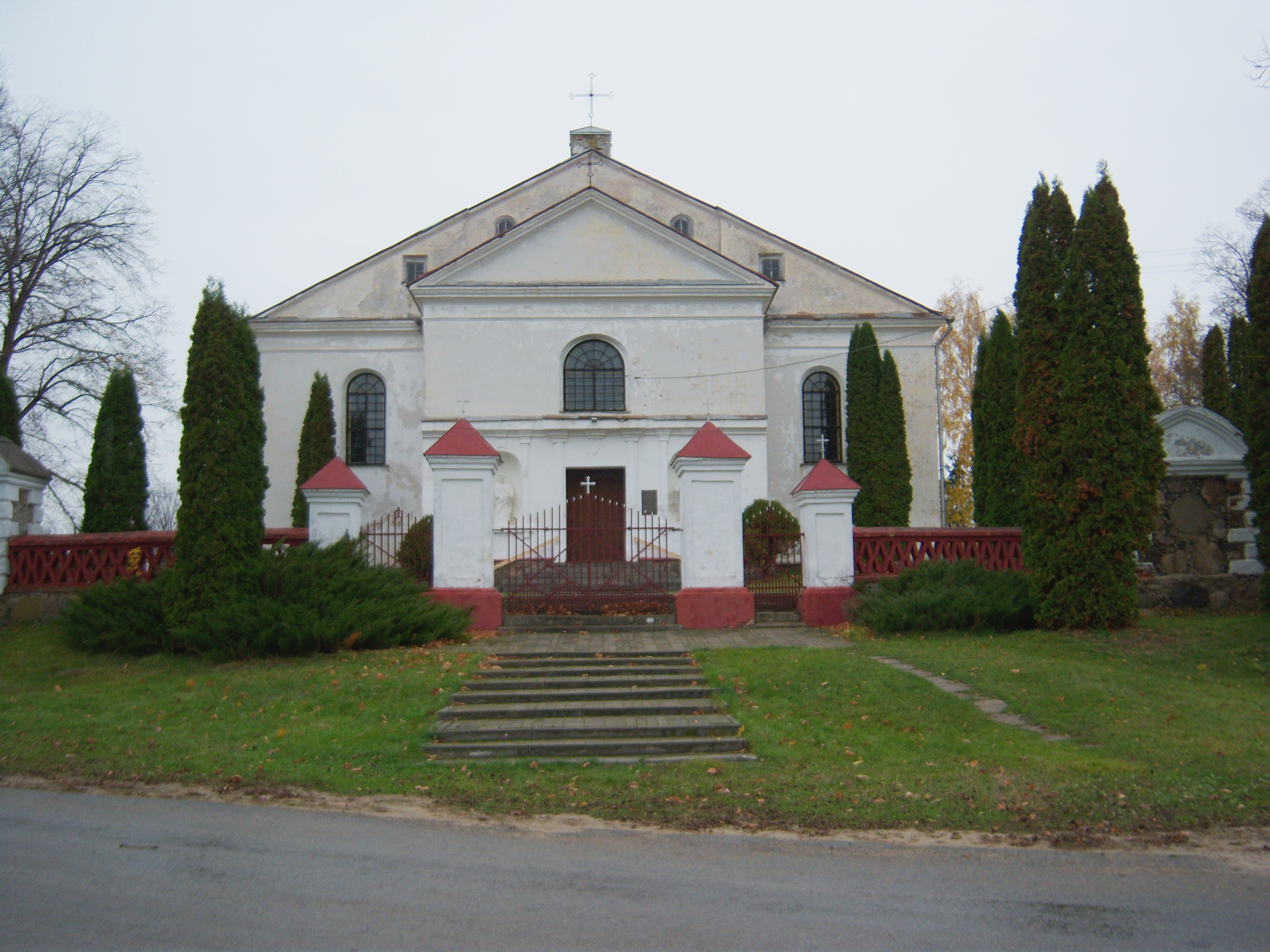

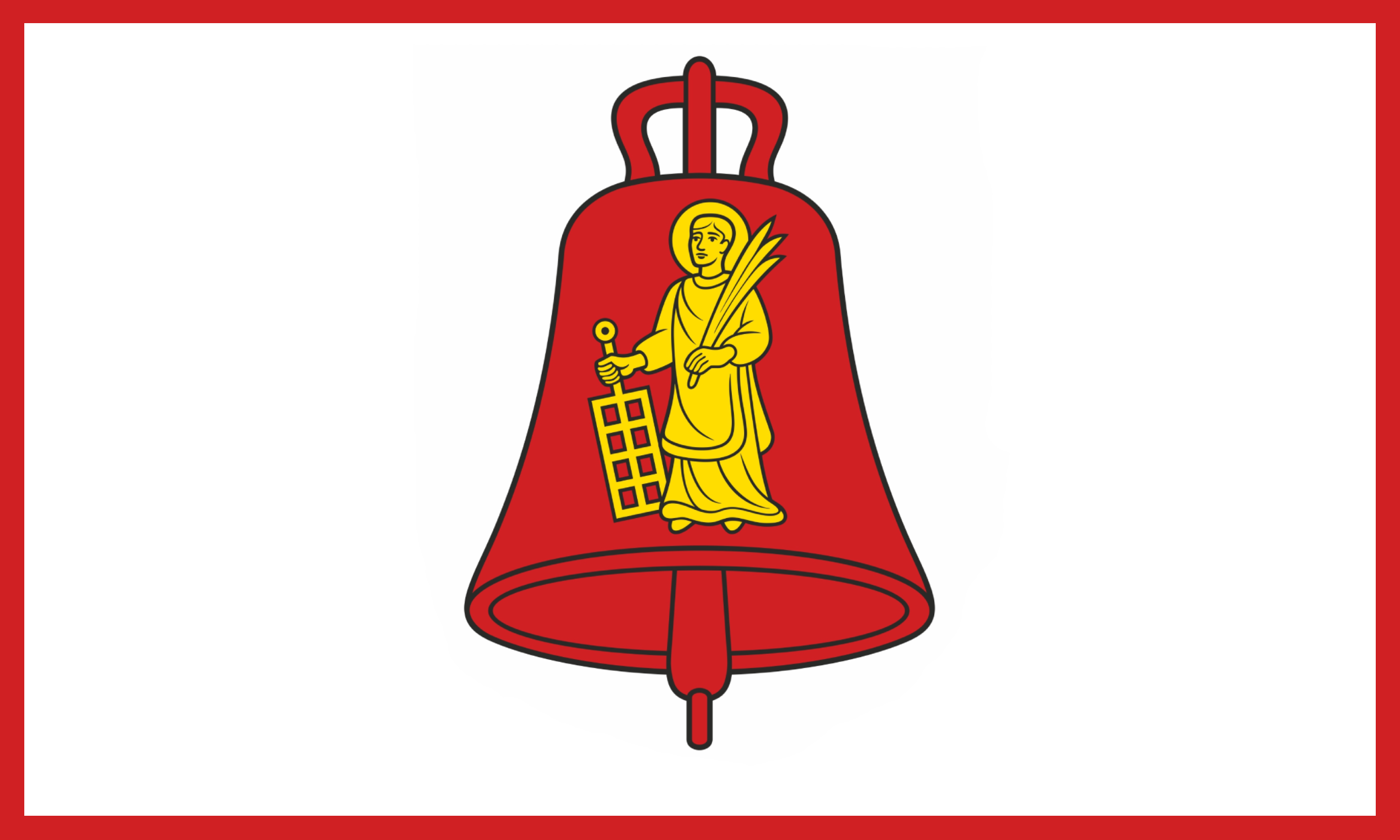
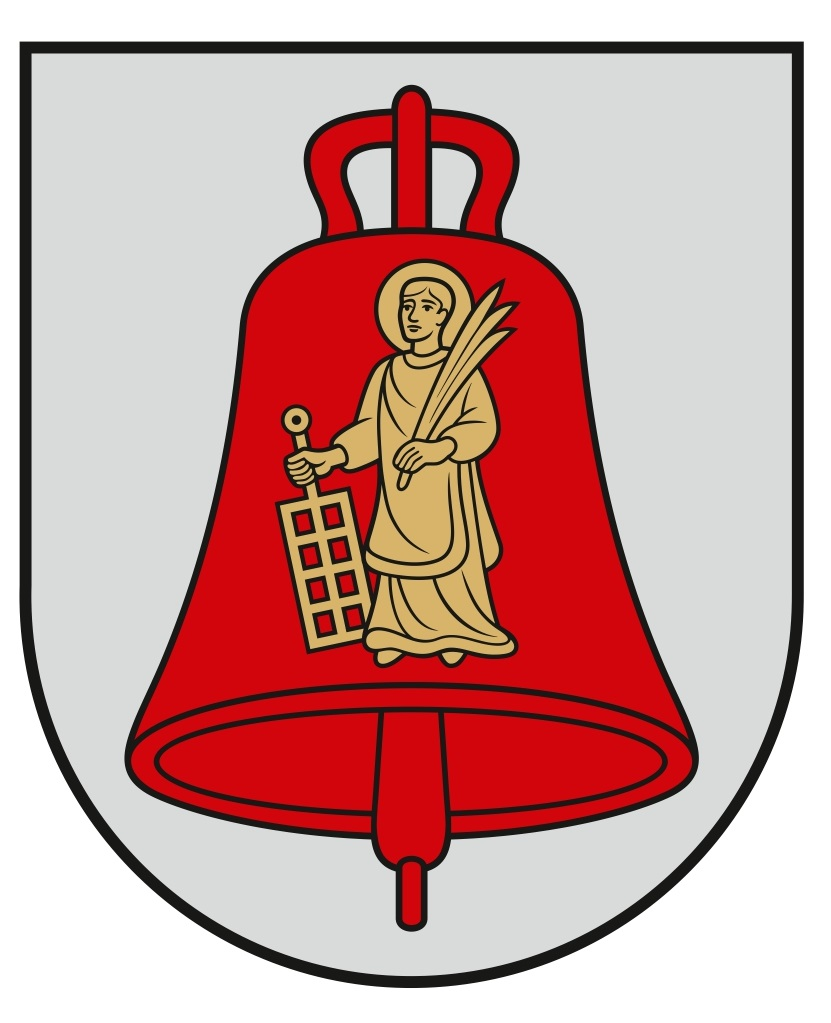
- Flag Coat of arms

- Location of Skapiškis
- Coordinates: 55°53′30″N 25°12′0″E
- Country: Lithuania
- Ethnographic region: Aukštaitija
- County: Panevėžys County
- Municipality: Kupiškis district municipality
- Elderate: Skapiškis elderate
- Capital of: Skapiškis elderate
- First mentioned: 1492
- Granted city rights: 1633

Population (2011)
  - Total: 403
- Time zone: UTC+2 (EET)
  - Summer (DST): UTC+3 (EEST)

Skapiškis is a town in the Kupiškis district municipality, Lithuania. It is situated on the shores of Lake Mituva and near the road and railway connecting Panevėžys with Daugavpils. According to the 2011 census, it had a population of 403.

The first church, named after Saint Hyacinth, was built in 1519. In 1752 the Dominican friars established a monastery. The monks opened a parish school, which had 40 students in 1805. Both the monastery and the school were closed by tsarist authorities after the Uprising of 1831. After the construction of the Panevėžys–Daugavpils railway, the settlement grew into a trading town. It had 1,184 inhabitants in 1897. It declined sharply after World War II.
