= Kazys Musteikis =

Lithuanian military brigadier general

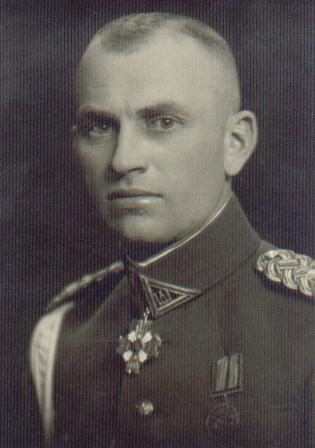
- Born: November 22, 1894; Stučiai, Tauragnai District
- Died: June 6, 1977 (aged 82); Chicago, Illinois, United States
- Occupations: Brigadier general of the Lithuanian army
- Spouse: Gražina Musteikienė
- Children: Kazimieras Musteikis, Marija Gražina Musteikytė
- Awards: Order of the Lithuanian Grand Duke Gediminas, 3rd Class; Order of Vytautas the Great, 3rd Class

Kazys Musteikis (November 22, 1894 – June 6, 1977) was a Lithuanian military brigadier general and served as Lithuanian minister of national defence from 1938 to 1940.

== Biography ==
In September 1939, at the beginning of the Invasion of Poland and World War II, Musteikis supported Lithuania's neutrality and was against Adolf Hitler's call to Lithuanians to attack Vilnius. After receiving the 1940 Soviet ultimatum to Lithuania on the night of June 14, 1940, during the last meeting of the Lithuanian government held in Kaunas, he urged that the ultimatum be rejected and argued for military resistance. On June 15, 1940, he called on the 9th Infantry Regiment of Marijampolė to cover the departure of President Antanas Smetona and to symbolically resist the Army of the Soviet Union; the regiment marched but was stopped in Vilkaviškis. The same day he left for Germany with Smetona. He then relocated to the United States in 1949, where he lived in Roslindale and then Dorchester, Massachusetts. He died in Chicago in 1977.

Musteikis was a recipient of the Order of the Lithuanian Grand Duke Gediminas 3rd Class (1929), the Order of Vytautas the Great 3rd Class (1935), and other medals.

== Family ==
Musteikis was the son of Kazimieras Musteikis (c. 1853–1909) and Anastazija Musteikienė (née Dicevičiūtė, 1866–1942). He was married to Gražina née Rudvalis (1910–2006). They were the parents of Gražina Musteikis (1937–1974).
