= Antanas Merkys =

Lithuanian politician and lawyer

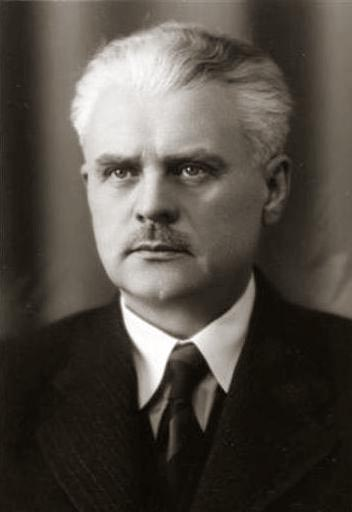

Acting President of Lithuania
- De facto (not recognized)
- Acting; 15 June 1940 – 17 June 1940
- Preceded by: Antanas Smetona
- Succeeded by: Justas Paleckis

16th Prime Minister of Lithuania
- In office 21 November 1939 – 17 June 1940
- President: Antanas Smetona
- Preceded by: Jonas Černius
- Succeeded by: Justas Paleckis

Personal details
- Born: 20 January 1887 Bajorai, near Skapiškis, Kovno Governorate, Russian Empire
- Died: 5 March 1955 (aged 68) Vladimir Oblast, Russian SFSR, Soviet Union
- Party: Lithuanian Nationalist Union
- Relations: Father: Karolis Merkys; Mother: Ona Plukaitė-Merkienė
- Education: Saint Vladimir University
- Occupation: Politician, lawyer

Antanas Merkys (1 February 1887 – 5 March 1955) was the last Prime Minister of independent Lithuania, serving from November 1939 to June 1940. When the Soviet Union presented an ultimatum to Lithuania demanding that it accept a Soviet garrison, President Antanas Smetona fled the country, leaving Merkys as acting president. Merkys ostensibly cooperated with the Soviets, and illegally took over the presidency in his own right. After three days, Merkys handed power to Justas Paleckis, who formed the People's Government of Lithuania. When Merkys attempted to flee the country, he was captured and deported to the interior of Russia, where he died in 1955.

== Biography ==
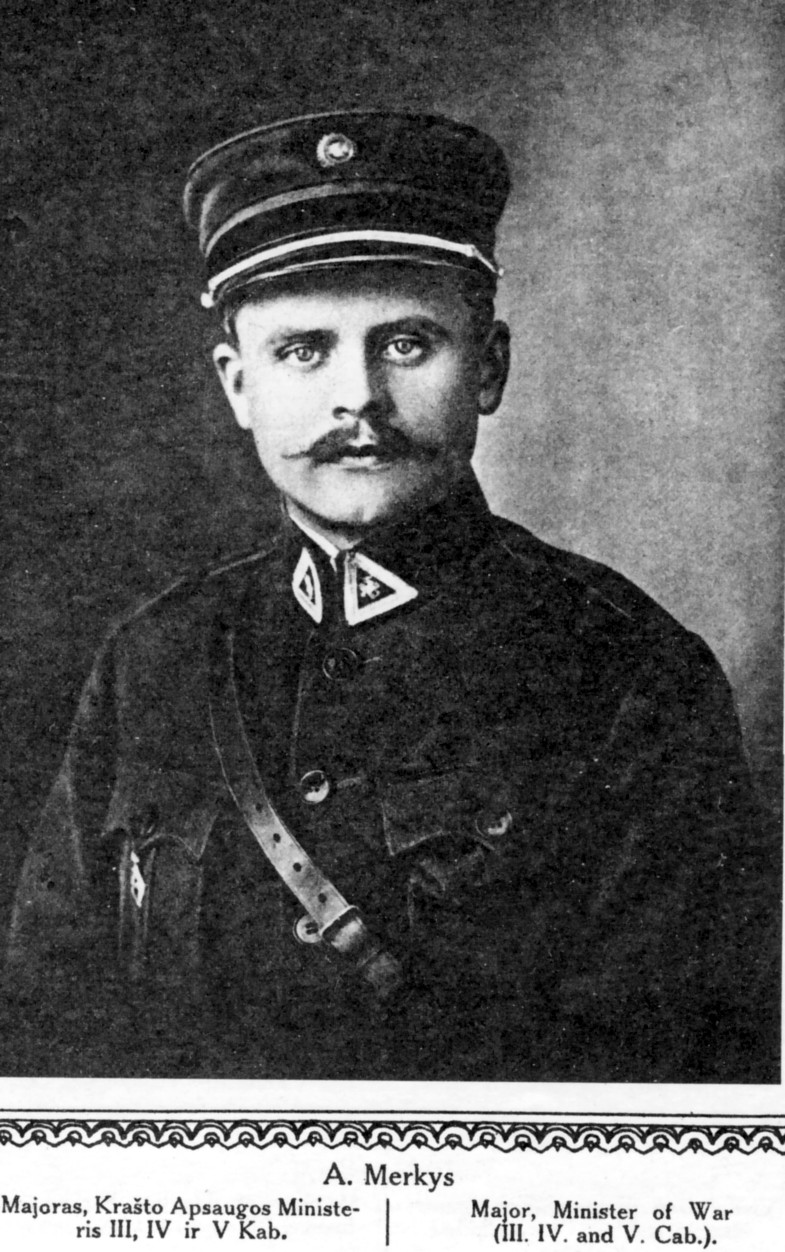
A. Merkys in 1921

Merkys was born in Bajorai, near Skapiškis. Educated in law, he served in the Russian Army during World War I (1914–18). In 1919, he served as the newly independent Lithuania's Minister of Defence, before serving with the Lithuanian Army until his decommissioning in 1922. He then practised as a lawyer.

After the Klaipėda Revolt of 1923, Merkys became secretary to the Klaipėda Region Commissioner, Antanas Smetona. Following the 1926 Lithuanian coup d'état, he became Minister of Defence again until 1927, when he was made Governor of the Klaipėda Region. In 1932, German demands prompted his removal as Governor and Merkys returned to practising law. He became Mayor of Kaunas in 1933 and served in this position until 1939. In 1936, he was elected to the Fourth Seimas of Lithuania. When the Vilnius region came under Lithuanian administration as a result of the German-Soviet invasion of Poland and the Lithuanian-Soviet agreements, Merkynas became the government commissioner for Vilnius and the Vilnius region. He was soon replaced by Kazys Bizauskas. On 17 November 1939, he became prime minister.

== Soviet ultimatum and occupation ==
When, on 14 June 1940, the Soviet Union presented an ultimatum to Lithuania, Smetona proposed armed resistance. Merkys suggested accepting the ultimatum and offered to resign as prime minister, but he temporarily remained in office.

Rather than accept the demands, Smetona fled to Germany and then to Switzerland. Before leaving the country, he symbolically turned over his presidential duties to Merkys. Under the Constitution of 1938, the prime minister served as acting president whenever the president was unable to carry out his duties.

The day after Smetona's departure, Merkys announced on national radio that he had removed Smetona and was now president in his own right. Merkys agreed to Soviet demands that Smetona be arrested, but was unsuccessful in doing so. The following morning, the cabinet resolved that Smetona had effectively resigned by leaving the country, and confirmed Merkys as president. On 17 June 1940, Merkys acceded to more Soviet demands—a) dispatch police to arrest Skučas and Povilaitis near the Lithuanian border and b) appointing left-wing journalist Justas Paleckis as the new prime minister. Merkys resigned later that day, making Paleckis acting president as well. The Soviets then used the more pliant Paleckis as a puppet to provide the ostensibly legal sanction for its annexation of Lithuania a month later.

Since regaining independence from the Soviet Union, Lithuania has maintained that Merkys had no valid claim to the presidency since Smetona never formally resigned. For that reason, Merkys is not recognized as a legitimate president in Lithuanian government records. When Lithuania declared independence from the Soviet Union in 1990, it took the line that Merkys' takeover of the presidency was illegal and unconstitutional, rendering actions leading up to Lithuania's annexation by the Soviet Union later that year ipso facto void. Therefore, Lithuania contended that it did not need to follow the secession process outlined in the Soviet Constitution, since it was reasserting an independence that still existed under international law.

A month later, Merkys attempted to escape to Sweden, but was arrested in Riga. He and his family were deported to Saratov in Russia. In 1941, Merkys was imprisoned. In 1954, during the period of de-Stalinization, Merkys was released from prison, but not allowed to return to Lithuania. He lived in Vladimir until his death the following year, on 5 March 1955. Subsequently, his grave could not be located, but a symbolic cenotaph dedicated to Merkys' memory is in the Petrašiūnai Cemetery in Kaunas.

== Awards ==
- (Lithuania) Order of the Cross of Vytis, Knight (5th Class, 1927)
- (Lithuania) Order of the Lithuanian Grand Duke Gediminas, Grand Cross (1938) and Commander's Grand Cross (1928)
- (Latvia) Order of the Three Stars, 1st Class (15 March 1937)

== See also ==
- Prime Minister of Lithuania
- List of rulers of Lithuania

== Bibliography ==
- Żurawski, Jacek (2022). "Wileńska prasa konspiracyjna 1939–1945" (PDF). Wydawnictwo Naukowe Muzeum Niepodległości.

Preceded by Jonas Černius	Prime Minister of Lithuania; 21 November 1939 – 17 June 1940	Succeeded by Juozas Ambrazevičius
