= Alfonsas Eidintas =

Lithuanian historian, diplomat and novelist

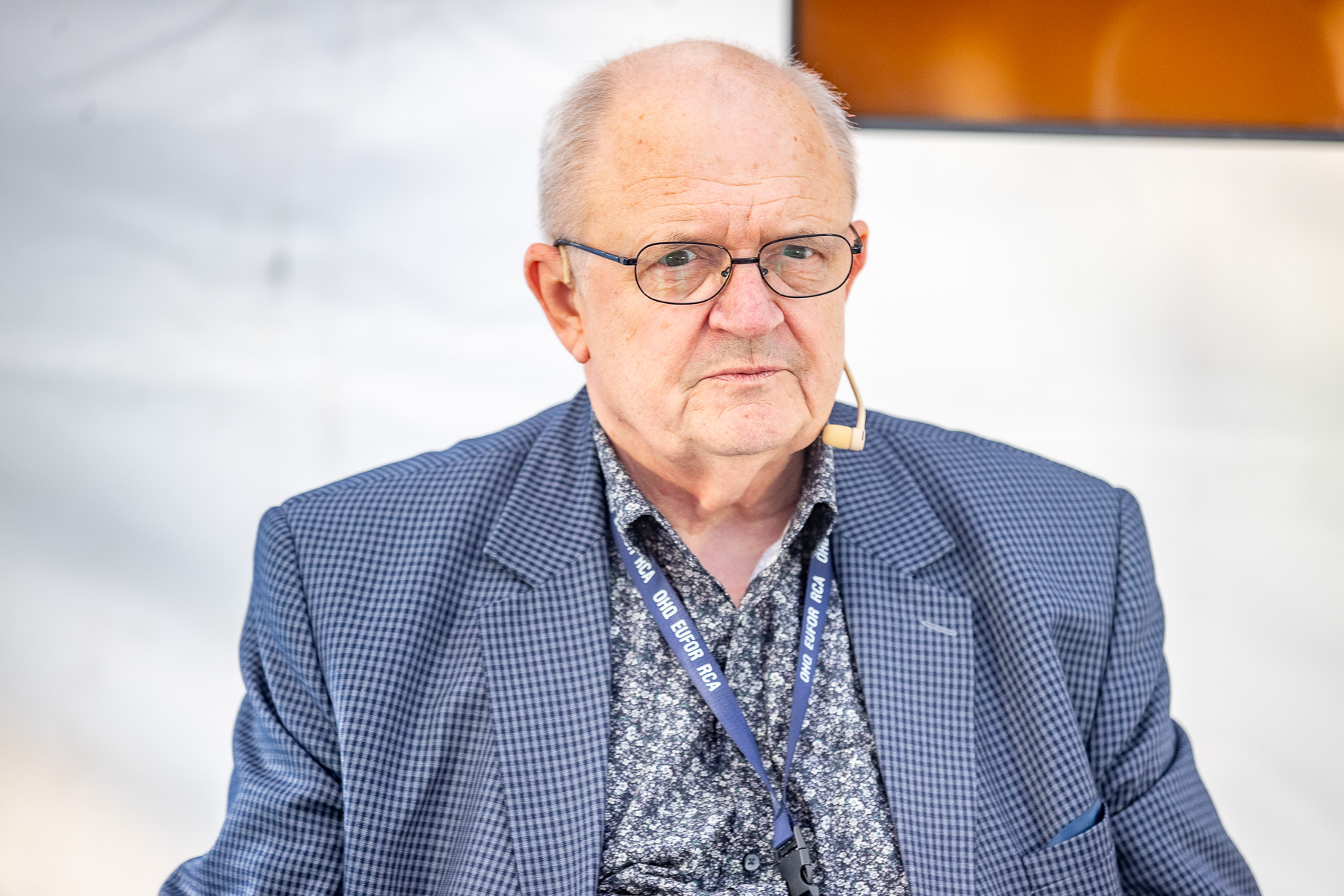
- Eidintas in 2023
- Born: 4 January 1952 (age 74); Vaiguva, Lithuania
- Occupations: Historian, diplomat, novelist

Academic background
- Education: Vilnius Pedagogical University

Academic work
- Discipline: Historian
- Institutions: Lithuanian Institute of History; Lithuanian Academy of Sciences

Alfonsas Eidintas (born 4 January 1952 in Vaiguva, Kelmė District Municipality, Lithuania) is a historian, diplomat and novelist. He was Lithuania's ambassador to various countries.

== Scholar ==
Between 1969 and 1973, Alfonsas Eidintas studied history at Vilnius Pedagogical University. He went to serve as chief lecturer, docent, head of the Universal History Department, and Deputy Dean at that institution. From 1986 to 1993, he was the Deputy Director for Research at the Lithuanian Institute of History of the Lithuanian Academy of Sciences. He received his habilitation in 1990.

== Diplomat ==
Eidintas entered the diplomatic service in 1993, serving as Lithuania's ambassador to the United States. He also concurrently served as Lithuania's ambassador to Canada and Mexico. From 2002 until 2005 he served as Ambassador of Lithuania to the State of Israel (with concurrent non-resident accreditation to Cyprus, Ethiopia, and South Africa). From 2006 until 2009 he served as ambassador to Norway, based in Oslo. He also worked in the Ministry of Foreign Affairs, most recently as ambassador-at-large at the Foreign Ministry's Information and Public Relations Department. He was a lecturer at the Institute of International Relations and Political Science.

== Author ==
He had authored over 20 books and at least 50 scientific articles about Lithuanian history and politics and published works of historic fiction: Ieškok Maskvos sfinkso ("In Search of the Moscow Sphinx"), Erelio sparnų dvelksmas, and Aukštai šaltos žvaigždės.

== Books ==
- Jonas Šliūpas: Knyga mokiniams. 1989.
- Naujas požiūris į Lietuvos istoriją. 1989.
- Antanas Smetona: Politines biografijos bruozai. 1990.
- Lietuvos Respublikos prezidentai. 1991.
- Slaptasis lietuvių diplomatas: istorinis detektyvas. 1992.
- Kazys Grinius: Ministras pirmininkas ir prezidentas. 1993
- Lietuvių kolumbai: Lietuvių emigracijos istorijos apybraiža. 1993.
- Aleksandras Stulginskis: Lietuvos prezidentas, Gulago kalinys. 1995.
- Lietuvos ambasados rūmų Washington, D.C. istorija. 1996.
- Lithuania in European Politics: The Years of the First Republic, 1918–1940 (with Vytautas Zalys). 1999.
- President of Lithuania: Prisoner of the Gulag-a Biography of Aleksandras Stulginskis. 2001.
- Žydai, lietuviai ir holokaustas. 2002.
- Jews, Lithuanians and the Holocaust. 2003.
- Lithuanian Emigration to the United States 1868–1950. 2003.
- Ambasadorius = Ambassador: tarnyba savo valstybei svetur: skiriama Lietuvos Respublikos užsienio reikalų ministerijos 85 metų sukakčiai. 2003.
- Ieškok Maskvos sfinkso: istorinis romanas. 2006.
- Žydai, Izraelis ir palestiniečiai. 2007.
- Erelio sparnų dvelksmas: istorinis romanas: "Ieškok Maskvos sfinkso" tęsinys. 2008.
- Istorija kaip politika: įvykių raidos apžvalgos. 2008.
- Aukštai šaltos žvaigždės: istorinis romanas: "Ieškok Maskvos sfinkso" ir "Erelio sparnų dvelksmo" tęsinys. 2009.
- The History of Lithuania. 2013.
- Aleksandras Stulginskis ir jo epocha. – Vilnius: MELC, 2014.– ISBN 978-5-420-01743-2
- Gyvenimas Lietuvai: Vincas Mašalaitis ir jo darbai. – Vilnius: MELC, 2015. – ISBN 978-5-420-01757-9

== Awards ==
- 2003: Commander's Cross of the Order for Merits to Lithuania

== Personal life ==
Eidintas is married; wife Birutė, a teacher. Daughters Aistė and Monika Albina, son Donatas.
