= Justas Paleckis =

Lithuanian Soviet author, journalist and politician

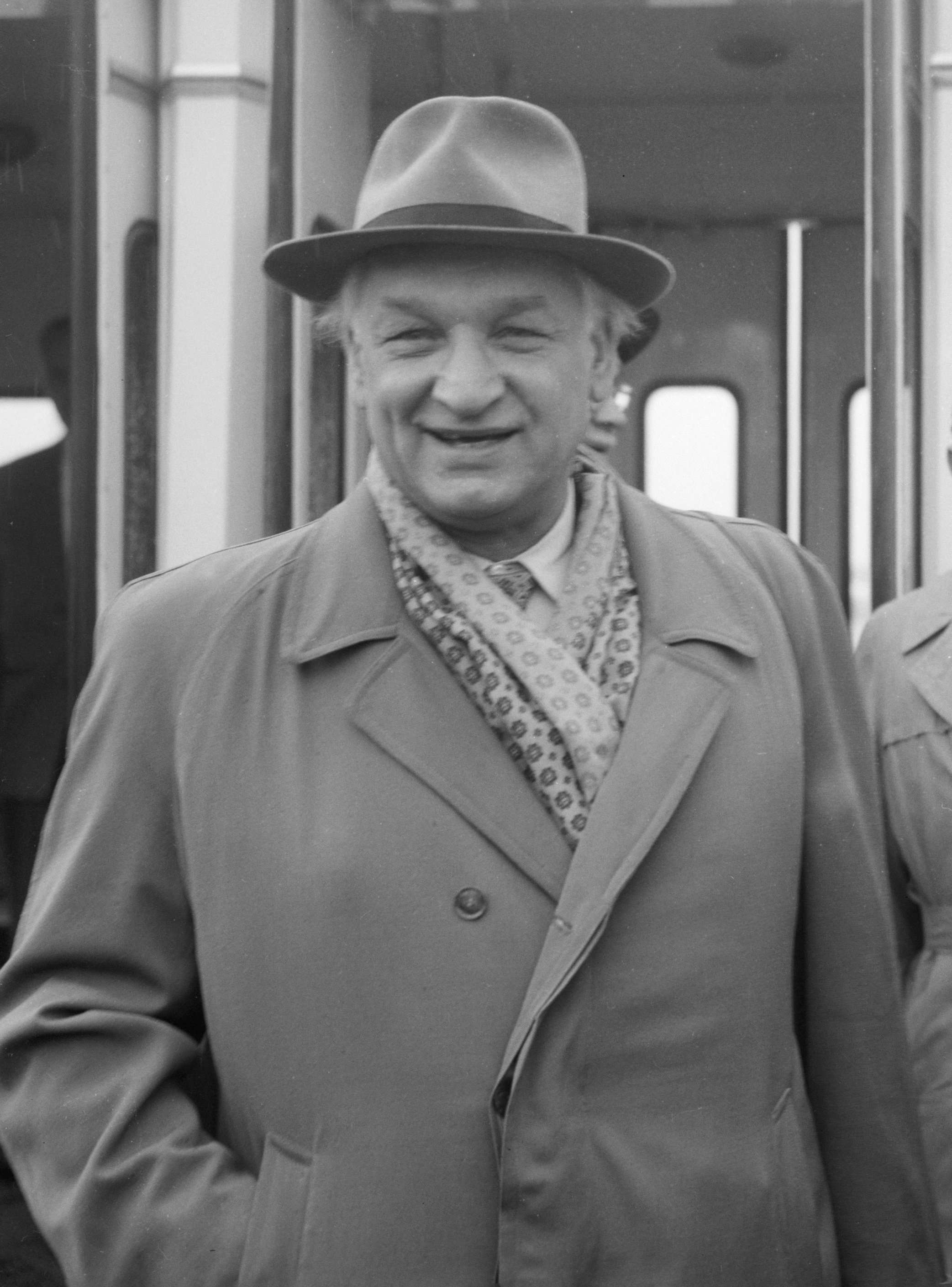
- Paleckis in 1961

Acting President of Lithuania
- De facto (not recognized)
- In office 17 June 1940 – 24 August 1940
- Preceded by: Antanas Merkys
- Succeeded by: Himself as Chairman of the Presidium of the Supreme Soviet of the Lithuanian SSR

Prime Minister of Lithuania
- De facto (not recognized)
- In office 16 June 1940 – 24 August 1940
- Preceded by: Antanas Merkys
- Succeeded by: Vincas Krėvė-Mickevičius

Chairman of the Presidium of the Supreme Soviet of the Lithuanian SSR
- In office 25 August 1940 – 14 April 1967
- Preceded by: Himself as de facto President of Lithuania
- Succeeded by: Motiejus Šumauskas

Personal details
- Born: 10 January 1899 Telšiai, Kovno Governorate, Russian Empire
- Died: 26 January 1980 (aged 81) Vilnius, Lithuanian SSR, Soviet Union
- Party: Lithuanian Popular Peasants' Union (1926–27); Communist Party of Lithuania (1940–80)
- Education: Vytautas Magnus University

Justas Paleckis (22 January [O.S. 10 January] 1899 – 26 January 1980) was a Lithuanian Soviet author, journalist, and politician. He was the nominal acting president of Lithuania after the Soviet invasion while Lithuania was still ostensibly independent, in office from 17 June to 3 August 1940. He then remained the nominal head of state of the Lithuanian SSR until 1967.

== Life and career ==
Paleckis was born in Telšiai in 1899 into the family of a blacksmith with noble heritage. In 1926–1927, he was a director of the Lithuanian official news agency, ELTA. He later voiced opposition to the ruling elite in Lithuania; in this way, he became a suitable candidate for the Lithuanian communists (subordinate to Soviet envoy Vladimir Dekanozov) to become the leader of Lithuania in the Soviets' planned takeover of the country in 1940. Paleckis had connections to the Lithuanian Communist Party from the mid-1930s.

When the Soviet Union issued an ultimatum to Lithuania in 1940, President Antanas Smetona instructed Prime Minister Antanas Merkys to deputize for him as President and he and his family fled to Germany, later to Switzerland, and then the USA. Merkys became acting president. A day after Smetona left the country, Merkys appointed Paleckis Prime Minister. Merkys himself resigned, making Paleckis acting president as well. These moves are now considered illegal and unconstitutional, since Smetona never resigned. As such, Lithuanian government records do not recognize Paleckis as a legitimate president.

By this time, Lithuania had been occupied by Soviet troops. Paleckis' appointment as Prime Minister was made under orders from the Soviet embassy in Kaunas. Aided by specialists sent in from Moscow, Soviet deputy foreign minister Vladimir Dekanozov worked through the Lithuanian Communist Party, while the cabinet of ministers, headed by Paleckis, served an administrative function. Dekanozov and Paleckis brought a number of non-Communists into the first "People's government".

In the aftermath of the war, the Soviet Union attempted to justify its annexation of the Baltic States. Therefore, Moscow ordered the Paleckis government to carry out elections for a "People's Seimas" on 14–15 July. Voters were presented with a single list of candidates containing only Communists and their allies. When the People's Seimas met on 21 July, it had only one order of business—a resolution declaring Lithuania a Soviet republic and requesting admission to the Soviet Union, which was unanimously carried. A few days later, Moscow "accepted" the request—thus giving credence to the official line that Lithuania had carried out a socialist revolution independent of Moscow's influence and requested admission to the Soviet Union.

After Lithuania was "admitted" to the Soviet Union, Paleckis joined the Communist Party. The People's Seimas reorganized as the provisional Supreme Soviet of the Lithuanian SSR and elected Paleckis as Chairman of its Presidium, a post he held until 1967. However, while he remained nominal head of state, real power would now lay with local Communist Party boss Antanas Sniečkus. With the agreement of Paleckis, Merkys and Minister of Foreign Affairs Juozas Urbšys were deported to the Russian SFSR.

Paleckis branded himself as a liberal communist, and was known to favor a more humane way of governing. He often disagreed with the old communists, and he reacted more sensitively than others to the Russification of Lithuania, the spread of internationalism, and the persecution of the intelligentsia as well as dissidents.

He served as Chairman of the Soviet of Nationalities from 1966 to 1970.

His son Justas Vincas Paleckis is a politician, having served as a Member of the European Parliament.

Paleckis was also awarded the Hero of Socialist Labour of the Soviet Union.

His grandson Algirdas Paleckis was imprisoned for spying for Russia in July 2021.

Party political offices
Preceded by Jānis Peive	Chairman of the Soviet of Nationalities; 2 August 1966 – 14 July 1970	Succeeded by Yadgar Sadikovna Nasriddinova
