= Second Investigation Department =

Lithuanian intelligence agency

- Antrasis operatyvinių tarnybų departamentas
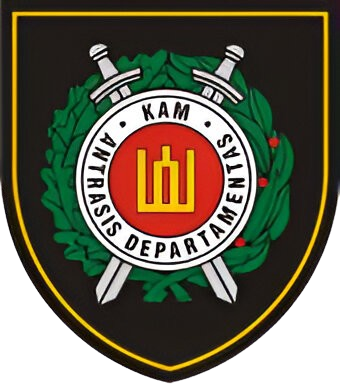

Agency overview
- Formed: 27 October 1918 (restored 1 June 1990)
- Jurisdiction: Ministry of National Defence
- Headquarters: Jankiškių g. 50, LT-02300 Vilnius, Lithuania
- Agency executive: Brig. gen. Remigijus Baltrėnas
- Website: aotd.lt

The Second Investigation Department or AOTD (Lithuanian: Antrasis operatyvinių tarnybų departamentas) is the national military intelligence agency under the Ministry of National Defence. It conducts analysis and development of intelligence collection and counterintelligence systems to create military security, clandestine and covert operations, counterterrorism, cyberwarfare, executive protection, foreign military threat assessment to national security, military cybersecurity, military intelligence as well as intelligence gathering and counterintelligence in the areas of defense, psychological warfare, and support hybrid warfare.

== History ==
The origins of the institution are in the Intelligence Unit established within the Lithuanian Armed Forces on 27 October 1918. In 1923, many intelligence activities were transferred to the Ministry of the Interior forming what later became the State Security Department of Lithuania. Military and defense related intelligence stayed within the General Staff and after 1929 the service was reorganized and named the Second Unit.

After Lithuania regained independence in 1990, the department was reestablished as the Information Unit, later reorganized and renamed to the Second Investigation Department in 1997. Its early task was to intelligence gathering and analyzing on Soviet military units operating in the region. Since Lithuania became a member of NATO, AOTD has cooperated closely with the NATO intelligence community.

== Leadership ==
Name	From	To	Unit name
Jonas Žilinskas	27 October 1918	12 May 1919	News Unit, Intelligence
Mykolas Lipčius	12 May 1919	9 April 1923	Intelligence Unit of the General Staff
Liudas Gira*	23 August 1919	9 November 1919	Intelligence Unit of the General Staff
Petras Kirlys	10 April 1923	24 January 1924	Intelligence Unit of the General Staff, Third Unit of the General Staff
Antanas Užupis	24 January 1924	1 January 1926	Information Unit of the General Staff
Kazys Škirpa	1 January 1926	22 June 1926	Information Unit of the General Staff
Petras Kirlys	22 June 1926	4 October 1926	Information Unit of the General Staff
Stasys Zaskevičius	4 October 1926	17 December 1926	Information Unit of the General Staff
Stasys Raštikis	17 December 1926	7 April 1930	Information Unit of the General Staff
Petras Kirlys	7 April 1930	1 September 1930	Second Unit of the General Staff
Juozas Lanskoronskis	1 September 1930	16 April 1934	Second Unit of the General Staff
Leonas Gustaitis	16 April 1934	7 September 1934	Second Unit of the General Staff
Konstantinas Dulksnys	7 September 1934	8 July 1940	Second Unit of the Army Staff
Nazi and Soviet occupation (1940–1990)
Alfonsas Bajoras	1 June 1990	March 1991	Second Unit of the National Defense Department, Information–Intelligence Unit of the National Defense Department
Liudas Bumbulis	April 1991	May 1991	Information–Intelligence Unit of the National Defense Department
Petras Ivoškis	2 January 1992	16 November 1992	"A" Unit of Information Service
Mindaugas Ravinskas	19 November 1992	7 May 1997	Second Unit, Intelligence Department, Counterintelligence Department, Intelligence and Counterintelligence Department, Second Department of the Ministry of National Defense
Virgilijus Česnulevičius	2 January 1992	21 April 1993	Counterintelligence Department
Kostas Mickevičius	7 May 1997	4 January 2001	Second Department of the Ministry of National Defense, Second Investigation Department
Gintaras Bagdonas	4 January 2001	6 January 2007	Second Investigation Department
Juozas Kačergius	6 January 2007	1 August 2012	Second Investigation Department
Alvydas Šiuparis	1 August 2012	1 August 2016	Second Investigation Department
Remigijus Baltrėnas	2 August 2016	13 August 2020	Second Investigation Department
Elegijus Paulavičius	13 August 2020		Second Investigation Department
* While Lipčius was on leave for medical reasons

== See also ==
- State Security Department
