= Konstantinas Dulksnys =

Lithuanian colonel of the General Staff, intelligence officer and lecturer

Colonel Konstantinas Dulksnys
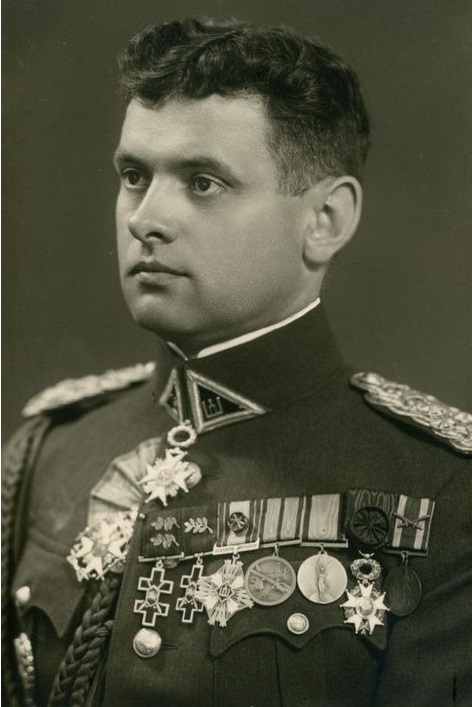
- Dulksnys photographed with uniform of the Lithuanian Army and state awards
- Born: 11 January 1901; Naiviai, Ukmergė County, Russian Empire
- Died: 30 July 1941 (aged 40); Moscow, Russian SFSR, Soviet Union
- Education: War School of Kaunas (1919), Higher Officers' Courses (1925), Academy of the General Staff of Prague (1931)
- Military career
- Allegiance: Lithuanian Armed Forces (1919–1940); Lithuanian People's Army (1940)
- Service years: 1919–1940
- Rank: Colonel of the General Staff
- Awards: Knight's Cross of the Order of the Cross of Vytis (1920); Officer's Cross of the Order of the Cross of Vytis (1923); Medal of Independence of Lithuania (1928); Officer's Cross of the Order of the Lithuanian Grand Duke Gediminas (1928); Commander's Order of the Three Stars (1935); Officer's Order of the Legion of Honour (1936); Commander's Cross of the Order of the Sword (1937); Commander's Cross of the Order of Vytautas the Great (1937); Commander's Cross of the Order of Polonia Restituta (1939)
- Other work: Lecturer

Konstantinas Dulksnys (11 January 1901 – 30 July 1941) was a Lithuanian colonel of the General Staff, intelligence officer, and lecturer.

== Personal life ==
In 1926, Dulksnys married Adelė Braižytė, who gave birth to their son Algimantas in 1929.

== Early life ==
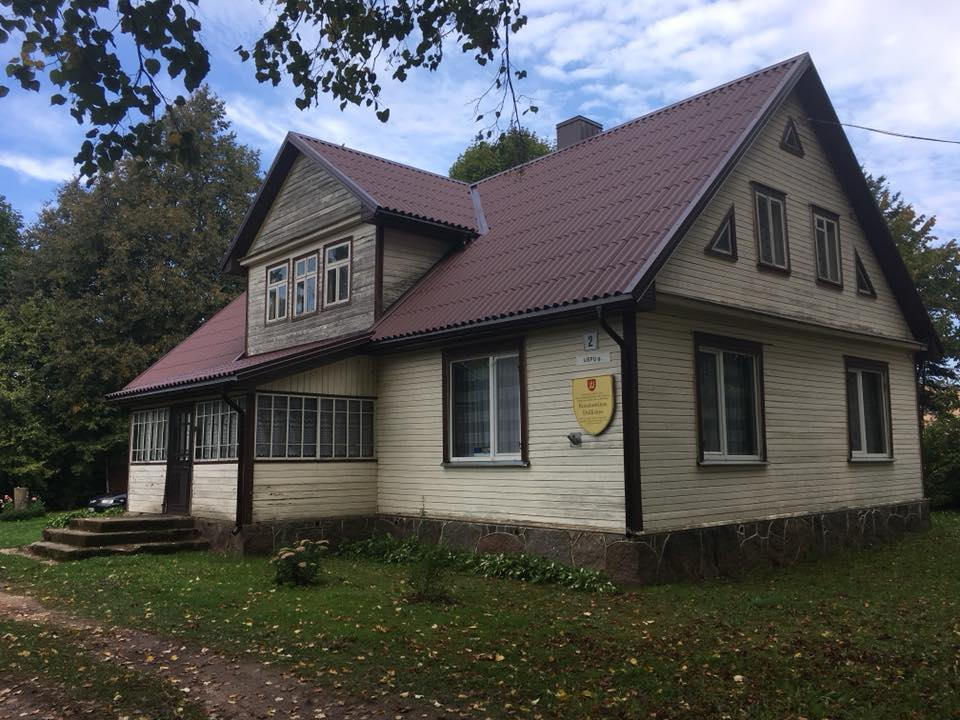
Dulksnys' native homestead in Naiviai, where he was born

Dulksnys was born on 24 January 1901 in Naiviai village, Kupiškis County, Russian Empire.

During the German occupation of Lithuania period, Dulksnys studied at the Kupiškis Progymnasium, which he graduated in 1919. Upon graduation, he joined a partisan squad in his native neighborhoods, mostly Puožo and the surroundings forests, and fought with the Bolsheviks. After successfully resisting the Bolsheviks, he received a certificate from the Head of the Security Division of the Kupiškis County Temporary Committee about his activities behind the enemy lines.

== Interwar Lithuania ==
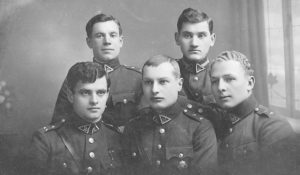
Dulksnys (in the first row first from the left) with other Lithuanian soldiers

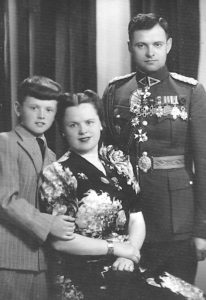
Dulksnys with his wife Adelė and son Algimantas

On 21 June 1919, Dulksnys joined the Lithuanian Armed Forces as a volunteer and participated in the Lithuanian Wars of Independence. He was assigned to the First Regiment of Cavalry, from where he was soon sent to the War School of Kaunas. Following graduation in December 1919, he served in various units. After staying at the Bermontian Front in the late December 1919, he began serving in the Fourth Infantry Regiment, a machine gun company, where on 4 May 1920 he received the military rank of junior lieutenant and was appointed junior officer of the 1st Company. In July 1920, he participated in fights with the Polish Armed Forces and in the battle near Benekoniai his right leg was wounded in action during more serious collisions with the enemy. He later limped as a result of this injury. After being treated at the Military Hospital for several weeks, he was examined by the permanent health examination commission, which on 29 October 1920 acknowledged that the wound was healed and that he was ready to return to the line-up. A few weeks later, he reappeared on the front lines again and took part in the fighting in Taučiuliai–Užuožeriai district. Following the end of the Lithuanian Wars of Independence, on 4 July 1921, he was awarded the Knight's Cross of the Order of the Cross of Vytis.

In 1921, Dulksnys was appointed the commander of the 2nd machine gun company. From January to June 1923, the junior lieutenant took part in fighting with the Polish partisans in the Širvintos area, where he liquidated the Sartono-Virbalis gang. For this, he was awarded the Officer's Cross of the Order of the Cross of Vytis.

On 24 January 1924, Dulksnys was awarded the military rank of lieutenant. After handing over a machine gun company to Lieutenant Tumelis, he went to the Higher Officers' Courses in 1924–1925, where he graduated from the general department. In January 1926, he was appointed junior officer of the 1st Company and was soon promoted to senior officer, and in August 1925 he was awarded the military rank of captain.

In 1927, Dulksnys graduated from Kaunas Pavasaris Adults Gymnasium and obtained a maturity certificate. In 1931, Dulksnys graduated from the Academy of the General Staff of Prague. In 1931–1933, Dulksnys served in the General Staff. In 1931, he was awarded the military rank of major. In 1933–1934, he served in the Ninth Infantry Regiment as a commander of a battalion and worked for the Lithuanian secret services. On 22 August 1934, he took up the position of the Chief of Division II (Intelligence) of the General Staff Board. It was soon announced that he had been awarded the military rank of lieutenant colonel. On 26 September 1935, he was appointed the Chief of the II Division (Information) of the Staff of the Lithuanian Armed Forces, where he worked until 6 July 1940. In 1936, he was awarded the military rank of colonel of the General Staff.

In 1932–1939, Dulksnys lectured at the Higher Officers' Courses and Higher Military School.

Dulksnys wrote articles for the publications Kardas, Mūsų žinynas, Karys, Trimitas, Lietuvos aidas.

== World War II ==
Following the Soviet occupation of Lithuania in June 1940, the Soviet tanks began to roll through the streets of Kaunas on 15 June 1940, and Soviet soldiers soon appeared in the military intelligence unit by hurrying to seize everything that was still undamaged. They robbed a photo lab, took photos and cameras, and eventually Lithuanian intelligence officers became the main target of the Soviets. The Lithuanian military intelligence and counter-intelligence officers were fired. Dulksnys was dismissed from his position on 6 July 1940. Although many scouts knew they were in danger, none of them withdrew from Lithuania and the arrests soon began. On 8 July 1940, Dulksnys was appointed a lecturer of the War School of the Lithuanian People's Army.

On 7 July 1940, Antanas Sniečkus signed a plan for the liquidation of the so-called anti-state parties and other governing staff. On July 18, 1940, the arrests of scouts began in all the occupied Baltic states. Three lieutenants were the first to be arrested in Kaunas by the NKVD: Dulksnys, Juozas Matusaitis, and Petras Kirlys. On 23 July 1940, Dulksnys was taken to the Lubyanka Prison in Moscow. According to the Lithuanian historian Arvydas Anušauskas, who studied the personal file of Dulksnys, the degrading conditions of detention were deliberately created for the prisoners, however even then the arrested Lithuanian officers did not lose their dignity. All three arrested Lithuanian military intelligence colonels were taken to the Lefortovo Prison in separate wagons, where they were confronted by Boris Rodos, a notorious interrogation officer of the NKVD. All of them were tortured, and admitted the imposed charges. They were sentenced to the most severe punishment – execution by firing squad. On 30 July 1941, the death penalty was executed in the Butyrka prison. According to Anušauskas, the death penalties were carried out without proof of guilt, therefore efforts were made to erase their activities from memory and to conceal deaths.

Witness Albinas Kaulakys often met Dulksnys' wife Adelė and son Algimantas, who were arriving to their family's homestead in Naiviai around 1941 as they were short of food while living in Kaunas during the difficult times.

For a long time there was no precise knowledge about the fate of Dulksnys. Historian V. Jankauskas revealed the fact that his wife Adelė, who departed to the West with their son Algimantas, received information about her husband's death only in 1990. The woman always felt that the beloved man had died in Soviet prisons or camps.

== Legacy ==
In 1996, a street in the Aleksotas neighborhood of Kaunas was named after him.

In 2011, a group memorial plaque was unveiled on the building in Kaunas (Gedimino Str. 38 / Nepriklausomybės Square) with text: "Čia buvusioje Lietuvos kariuomenės generalinio štabo II skyriaus būstinėje dirbo Lietuvos karinės žvalgybos ir kontržvalgybos pulkininkai Kostas Dulksnys, Juozas Mutasaitis ir Petras Kirlys. 1940 m. vasarą sovietų okupantų jie buvo suimti ir 1941 m. sušaudyti Maskvoje" (English: Lithuanian Military Intelligence and Counterintelligence Colonels Kostas Dulksnys, Juozas Mutasaitis, and Petras Kirlys worked here at the former headquarters of the Second Division of the General Staff of the Lithuanian Armed Forces. In the summer of 1940, they were arrested by the Soviet occupiers and in 1941 executed by firing squad in Moscow).

In 2018, a memorial plaque was unveiled on a wall of the native homestead of Dulksnys in Naiviai, Kupiškis District Municipality.
