= Lithuanian People's Army =

Armed forces of the Lithuanian Soviet Socialist Republic

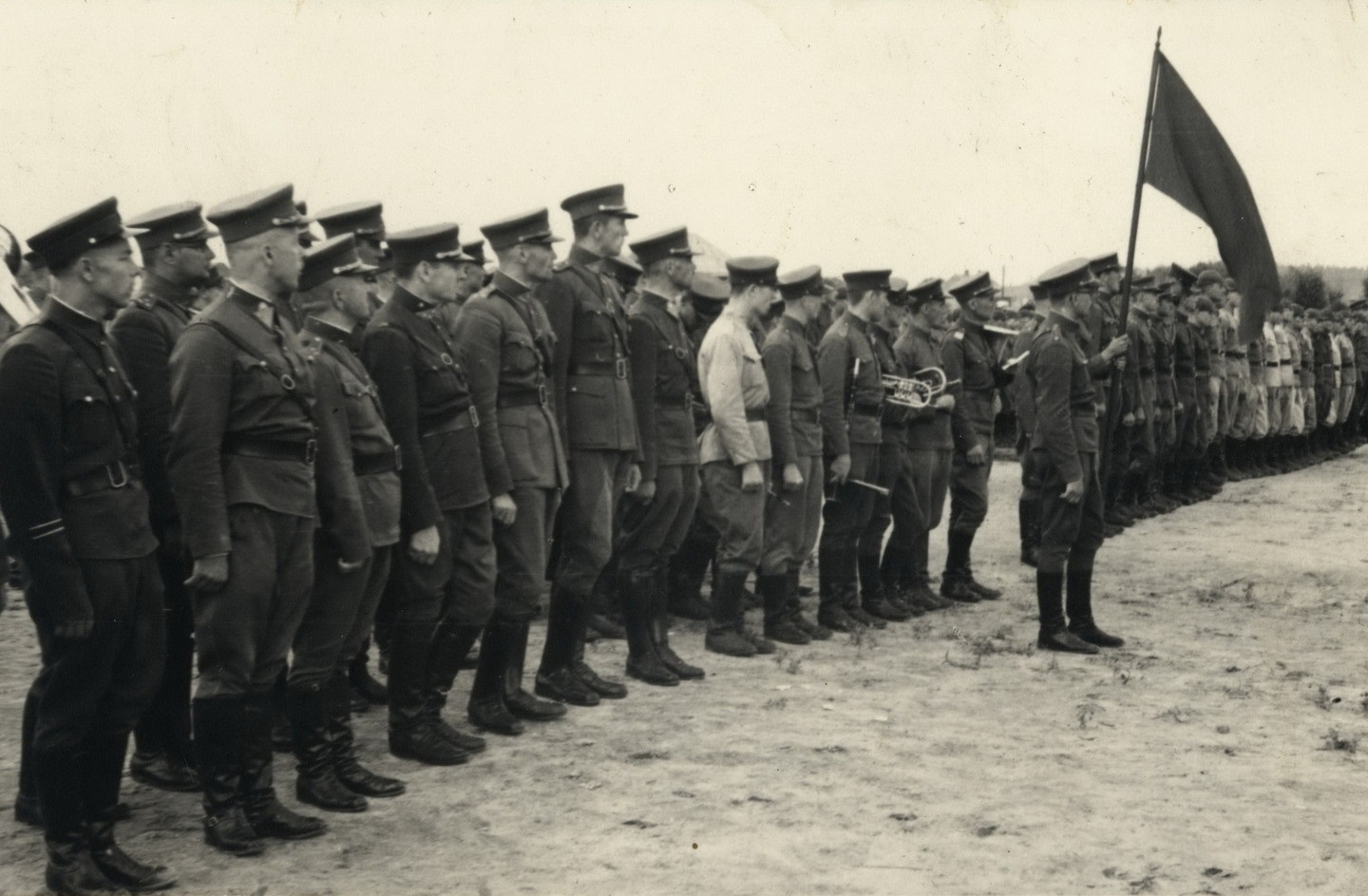
Unit of the army meeting with members of the People's Seimas

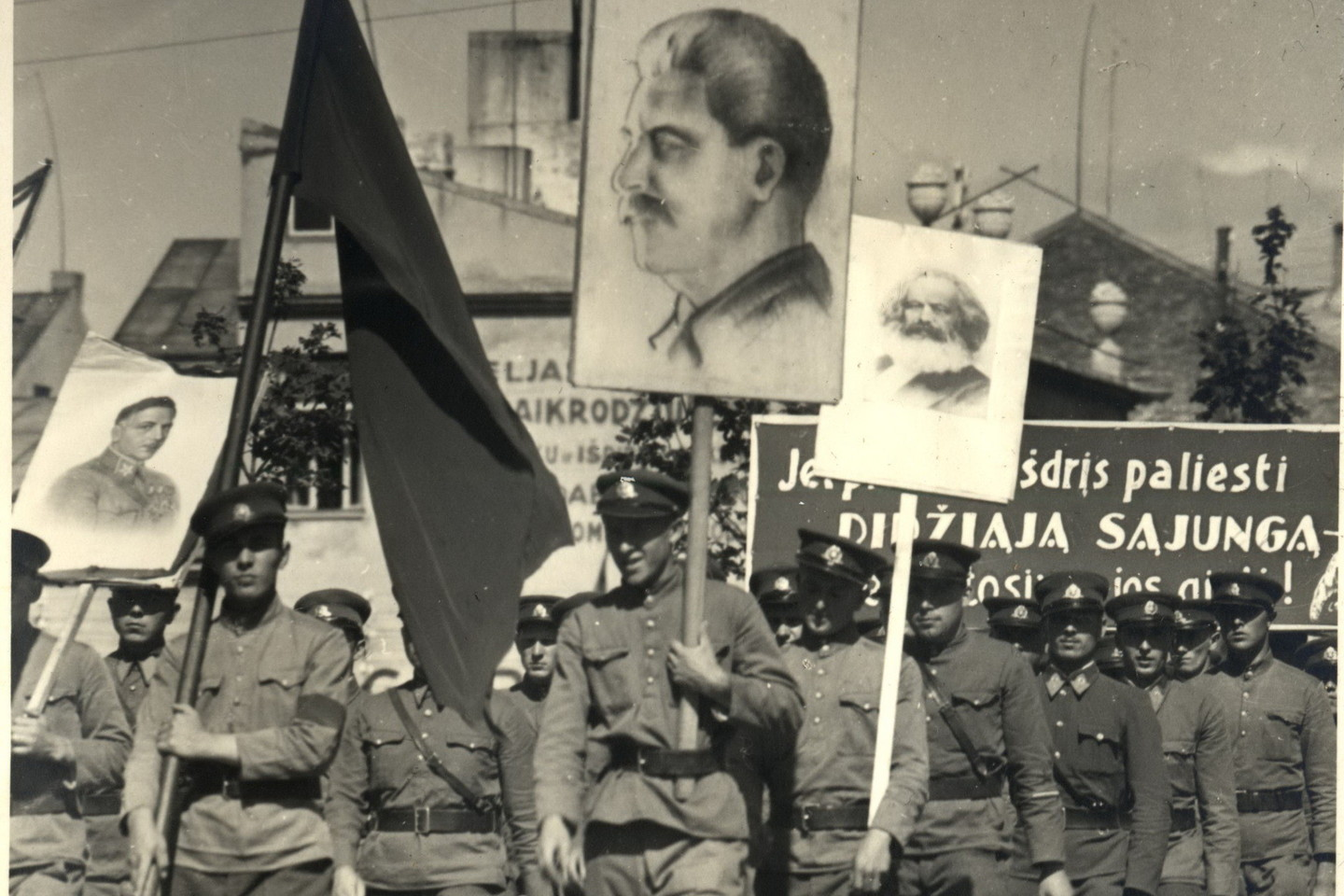
Soldiers of the army carrying Soviet propaganda posters

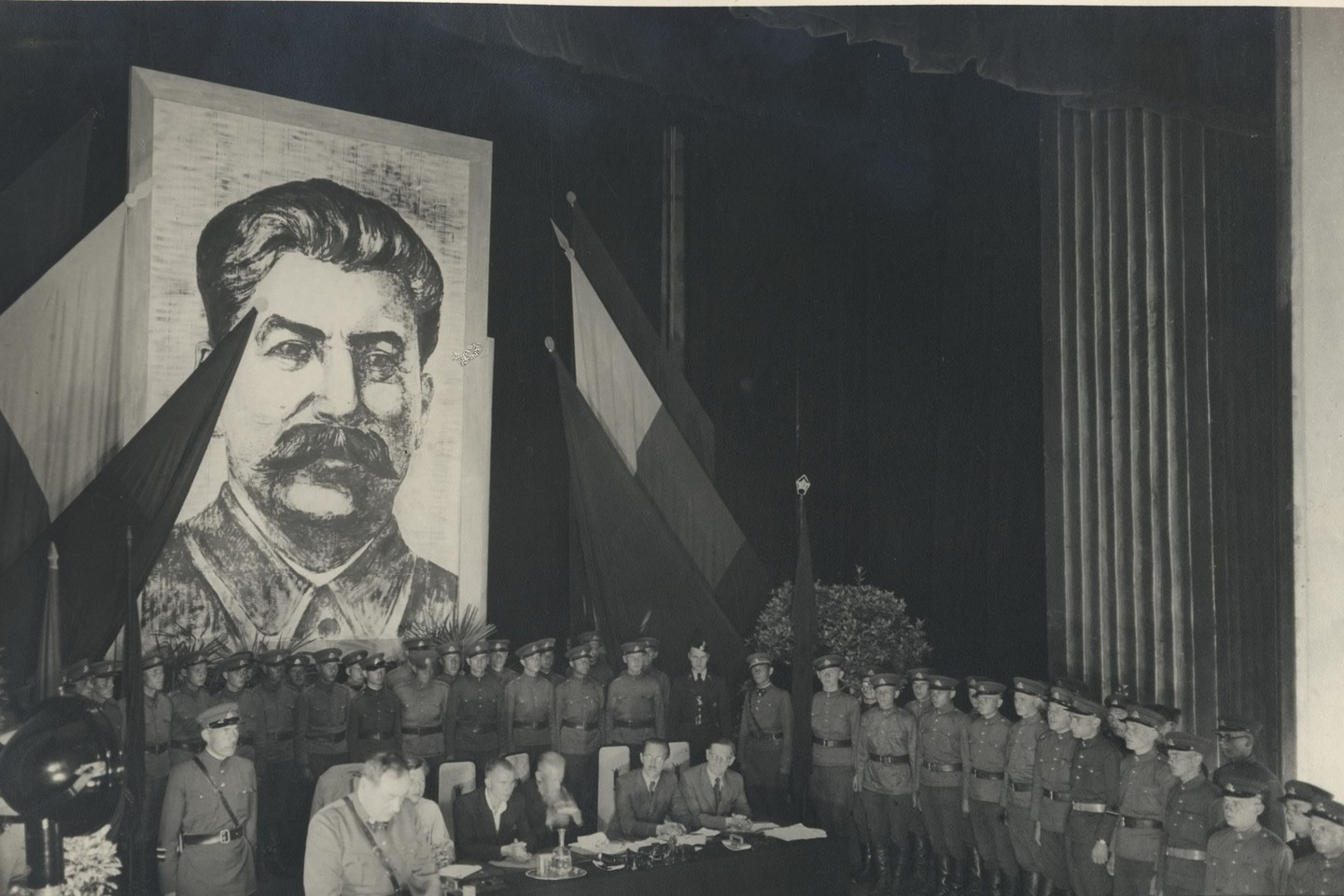
Delegation of the army attending the session of the People's Seimas

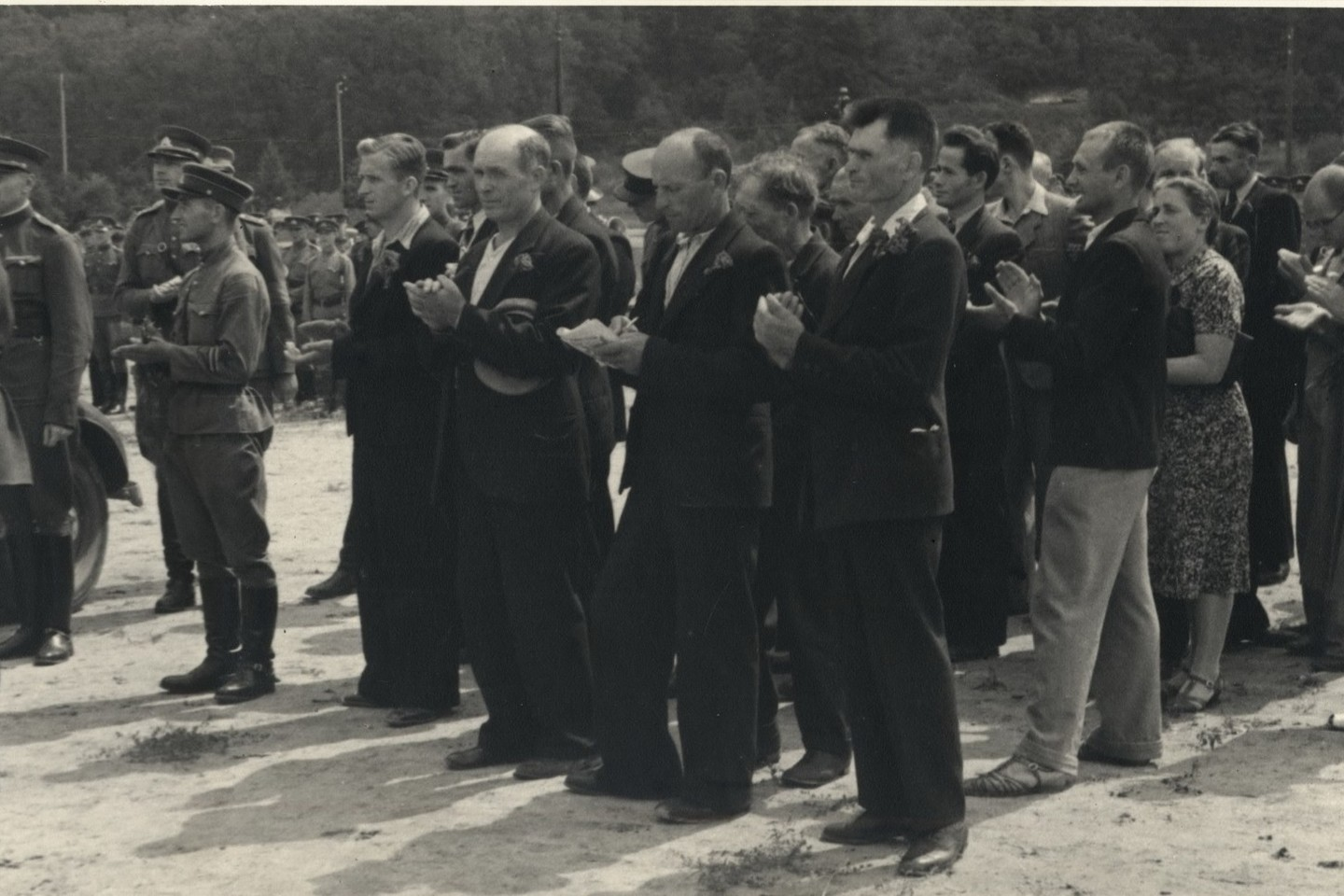
Members of the People's Seimas meeting with soldiers of the army

The Lithuanian People's Army (Lithuanian: Lietuvos liaudies kariuomenė) were short-lived armed forces of Lithuania and the Lithuanian Soviet Socialist Republic following the Soviet occupation of Lithuania in June 1940. The army was formed by the Act of 3 July 1940 of the People's Government of Lithuania and replaced the Lithuanian Armed Forces of independent Lithuania. According to data from 1 June 1940, the army had 28,115 persons – 26,084 soldiers (of which 1,728 were officers), 2,031 civil servants, and with the announcement of the mobilization it was possible to call 120,400 reserve troops.

The army existed until 30 August 1940 before being transformed into the 29th Rifle Corps of the Red Army. Many Lithuanian soldiers and officers were repressed by arrests or executions for their anti-Soviet attitude.

== History ==
=== Dismissal and arrests of officers ===
Following the occupation of Lithuania on 15 June 1940, the army was still formally headed by the Minister of National Defense and the Army Commander. However, in fact, it was directed by employees of the Embassy of the Soviet Union. The dissolution of the Lithuanian Armed Forces was started: on 19 June, the first four high-ranking officers were fired, and the cavalry was abolished by the end of the month. At the request of the Special Representative of the Soviet Government to Lithuania Vladimir Dekanozov, Prime Minister Justas Paleckis fired another 17 high-ranking officers from the army on 25 June, including Generals Edvardas Adamkavičius, Vladas Mieželis, Vladas Nagevičius, Klemensas Popeliučka, Mikas Rėklaitis, Kazys Tallat-Kelpša, and Emilis Vymeris. By the end of August 1940, 188 officers (9 generals, 24 colonels, 30 lieutenant colonels, 31 majors, 44 captains, 35 lieutenants, and 15 junior lieutenants) and many non-commissioned officers had been replaced, including almost all commanders of divisions, regiments, most battalions, and officers of the General Staff. A number of officers were arrested, including officers Konstantinas Dulksnys, Juozas Matusaitis, and Petras Kirlys (who on 6 June 1941 were executed by a firing squad in Moscow following the start of Operation Barbarossa together with the Director of the State Security Department Augustinas Povilaitis and the last Minister of Interior Kazys Skučas).

Soldiers of the 9th Infantry Regiment were targeted. On the personal order of the former Minister of National Defense Kazys Musteikis, the regiment was ordered to ensure the safe departure of President Antanas Smetona abroad on 15 June 1940. In case of an attack by the Soviet units, the regiment had to resist and, if the enemy proved superior, retreat to Germany. The regiment started marching towards Vilkaviškis, but was stopped by a delegation sent by the Prime Minister Antanas Merkys which convinced the commander of the regiment Antanas Gaušas to return to the barracks. However, that was enough to attract special attention from the Soviets. The regiment commander was immediately called to Kaunas and released into the reserve. Soon on 5 July 1940, the regiment was transferred to the Pabradė military ground and dispersed there: the regiment headquarters, the staff team, engineering units and motor units were transferred to Švenčionėliai, and two companies were left in Marijampolė and Vilkaviškis. Despite that, soldiers of this regiment remained negative towards the elections of the People's Seimas and adoption of a new Soviet-style Constitution and publicly sang Tautiška giesmė. Consequently, 31 soldiers were arrested, and commander of the regiment Karolis Dabulevičius was removed from office after serving less than a month.

=== Army transformation ===
The Soviets sought to transform the Lithuanian Armed Forces into the Lithuanian People's Army, which would be very similar to the Red Army. There was a particular urgency to eliminate the army's ties with the Lithuanian Riflemen's Union; thus all 22 military commanders (there also were the same number of riflemen teams) of 20 counties, Vilnius, and Kaunas were removed or transferred to other positions. On 2 July 1940, the institution of military chaplains was abolished and the promotion of religion was banned. On 6 July 1940, the Political Board along with an institution of communist political leaders (politruks) was established to control the activities of all commanders. The Lithuanian national symbols and shoulder straps were abolished, and a surveillance system was introduced. According to Stasys Pundzevičius, in order to suppress the national sentiment of the army, the political leadership of the army, through the army commander, demanded that the singing of the Lithuanian national anthem be banned and national flags be removed, while the officers were fired from the army only by the orders of the political leadership based on the pre-prepared lists. The Soviet propaganda about Lithuania's accession to the Soviet Union was spread in the army, and soldiers were forced to take part in political rallies. Pursuant to the directive of the People's Commissar of Defense of the Soviet Union of 17 August 1940, the Council of People's Commissars of the Lithuanian SSR abolished the Ministry of National Defense of Lithuania by a resolution of 27 August 1940.

Commanders of the Lithuanian People's Army were: Vincas Vitkauskas (until 12 July 1940), Feliksas Baltušis-Žemaitis (since 12 July 1940), while the Chief of Staff was Stasys Pundzevičius.

=== 29th Rifle Corps of the Red Army ===
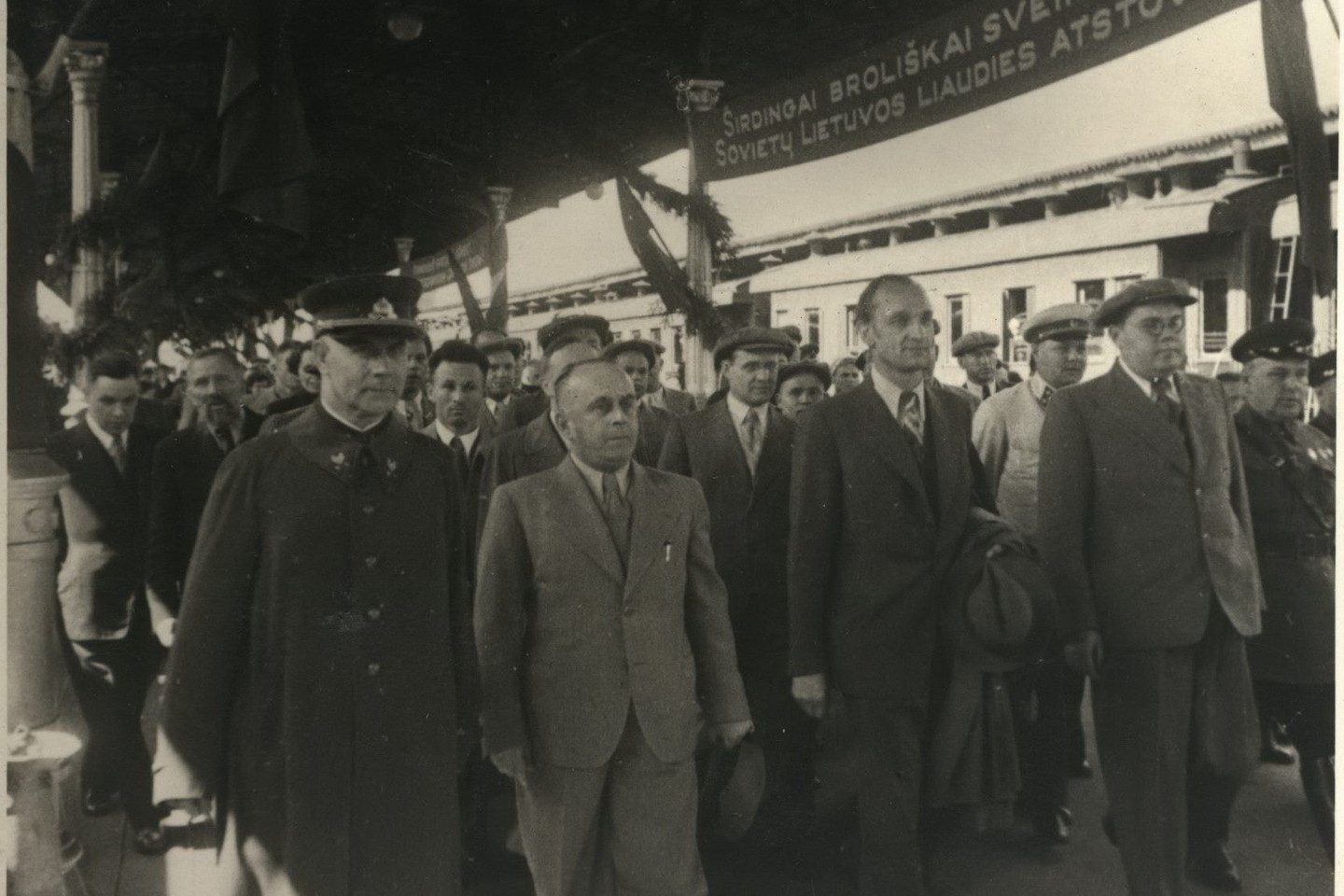
Authorized Commission, which includes Vincas Vitkauskas and Justas Paleckis, in Moscow, 1940

On 11 July 1940, even before the elections to the People's Seimas, People's Commissar for Defence Semyon Timoshenko announced the creation of the Baltic Military District of the Red Army. On 14–15 July 1940, the rigged show elections to the People's Seimas were held; one of the elected members was Vincas Vitkauskas. The voters had no choice as 79 candidates were nominated for 79 seats. According to the falsified official data, 95.1% of all eligible voters participated in the People's Seimas elections, and 99.19% of voters voted for the nominated candidates. Following the elections, rallies organized by the communists began to demand that the People's Seimas declare Soviet rule in Lithuania and annex Lithuania to the Soviet Union. On 21 July 1940, the People's Seimas adopted declarations which on the initiative of the Communist Party of Lithuania were included in the agenda of the session, regarding the state system (announced the Lithuanian Soviet Socialist Republic) and Lithuania's accession to the Soviet Union. The Authorized Commission delivered the Declaration of the People's Seimas on Lithuanian SSR's Accession to the Soviet Union to the Supreme Soviet of the Soviet Union. On 3 August 1940, the Supreme Soviet of the Soviet Union declared Lithuanian SSR a Soviet republic of the Soviet Union.

By the resolution of the Council of People's Commissars of the Lithuanian SSR of 30 August 1940, implementing the instructions of Moscow, the Lithuanian People's Army was transformed into the 29th Rifle Corps (commander Vincas Vitkauskas) under the Baltic Military District of the Red Army. According to the same resolution, all armaments, buildings and other property, along with all files and archives, were handed over to the Baltic Military District. The War School of Kaunas was abolished and replaced by Vilnius Infantry Military School. Military commandants had to be transformed into military commissariats, also under the auspices of the Baltic Military District. The Soviets from Moscow called for the liquidation of parts and institutions of the Lithuanian Armed Forces as soon as possible. On 17 October 1940, the Staff of the 29th Rifle Corps received order to complete the dismantling of warehouses, workshops, hospitals, institutions, non-staff teams and other organizational units of the former Lithuanian Army not included in the 29th Rifle Corps. On 28 October 1940, the last remnants of units and institutions of the Lithuanian Armed Forces that did not enter the 29th Rifle Corps were liquidated.

=== Resistance ===
The work of forming the corps was accompanied by constant arrests of soldiers and officers who openly expressed their dissatisfaction (e.g. by raising the Lithuanian tricolor flag or creating and distributing anti-Soviet posters and leaflets). The Soviets recognized the hostile attitudes. For example, during the meeting on 25 October 1940 of the Bureau of the Central Committee of the Communist Party of Lithuania— chaired by Antanas Sniečkus, and attended by representatives of the Baltic Military District, 11th Army, and non-Lithuanian officers of the 29th Rifle Corps—the participants unanimously agreed that anti-Soviet mood prevailed in the 29th Rifle Corps and that the units were "polluted" with hostile elements. The NKVD believed that the most hostile officers had retreated to the underground and were preparing for more serious anti-Soviet attacks.

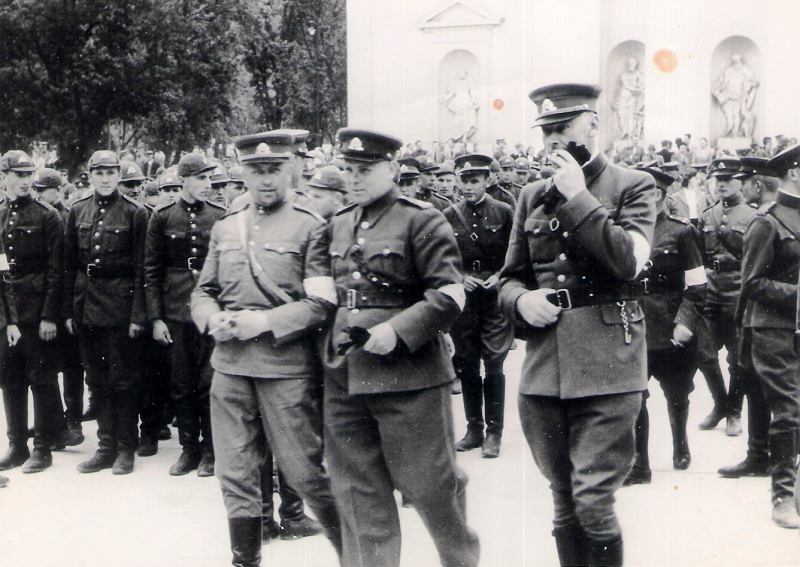
Lithuanian insurgents (LAF) and soldiers in Cathedral Square, Vilnius

In October 1940, the so-called Bulvičius Group was formed in Kaunas by Vytautas Bulvičius and other anti-Soviet Lithuanian officers mainly from the 29th Rifle Corps, as well as teachers, students, and engineers (e.g. J. Andriūnas, Pranas Dovydaitis, Adolfas Eidimtas, Pranas Gužaitis, Juozas Kilius, J. Sadzevičius, Leonas Žemkalnis). On 17 November 1940, on the initiative of Colonel Kazys Škirpa, the Lithuanian Activist Front was established in Berlin. Since the beginning of 1941, the group acted as the Vilnius' headquarters of the Lithuanian Activist Front. The NKVD tracked down the Bulvičius Group and arrested 16 people; seven were executed in Nizhny Novgorod.

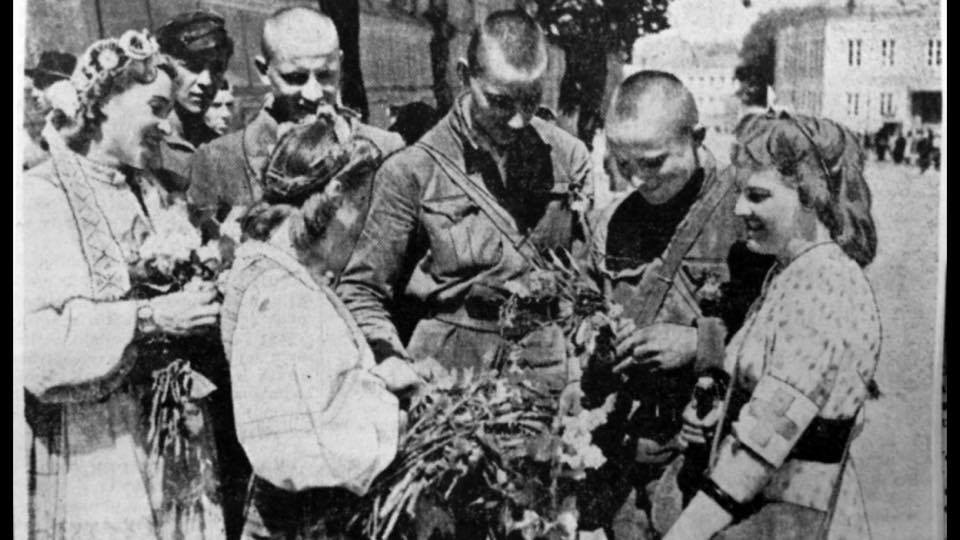
Lithuanian soldiers, liberated from the 29th Rifle Corps, greeted in Vilnius

At the start of the German invasion of the Soviet Union, over 5,000 soldiers from the 29th Rifle Corps in Varėna, Pabradė, and Vilnius joined the anti-Soviet June Uprising and gathered in Vilnius starting 24 June 1940. Not all Lithuanian pilots of the aviation squadron deployed in Ukmergė complied with the Soviet order to retreat to Gomel in the Byelorussian SSR. Some Lithuanian officers (e.g. Otto Milaševičius) shot themselves because they did not have the opportunity to resist with the gun or escape, as they were vigilantly monitored by NKVD and commissioners. On 24 June 1941, Stasys Pundzevičius was appointed Chief of the Lithuanian Armed Forces by the Provisional Government of Lithuania. Fewer than 1,500 troops of the 29th Rifle Corps complied with the Soviet order and fully retreated to the Pskov Oblast in the Russian SFSR. At the end of July 1941, the 29th Rifle Corps was disbanded and the soldiers were divided into other parts of the Red Army.

=== 16th 'Lithuanian' Rifle Division of the Red Army ===
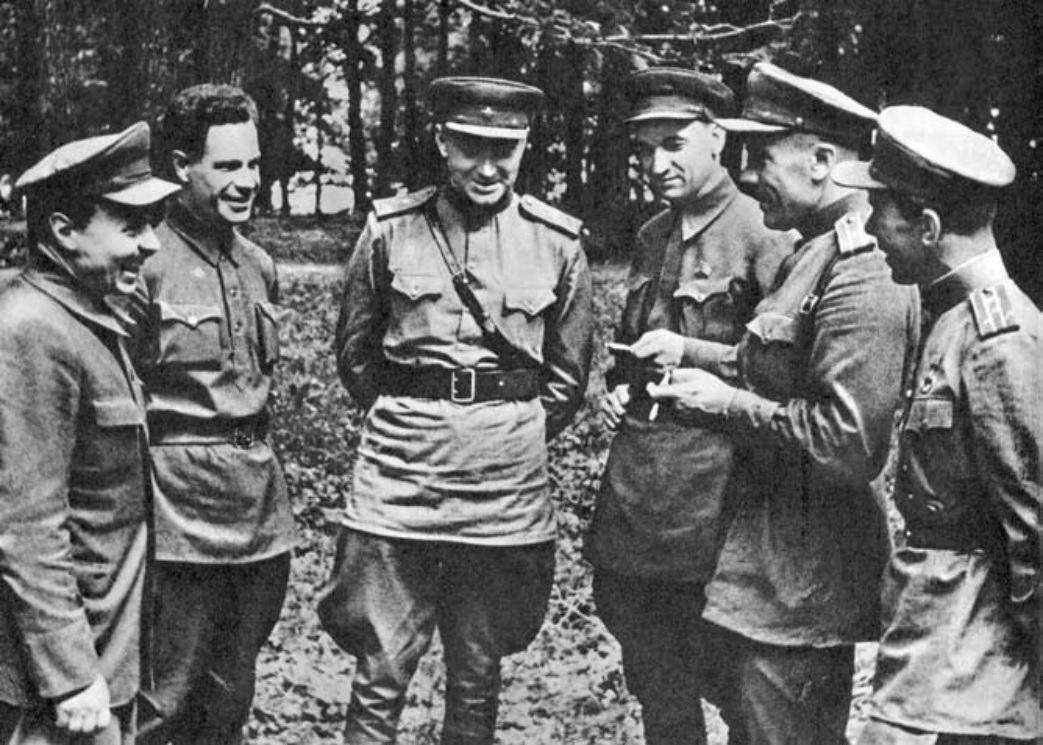
Lithuanian SSR leadership in the 16th 'Lithuanian' Rifle Division, including Antanas Sniečkus, Vladas Karvelis, Justas Paleckis, June 1943

On 18 December 1941, by the resolution of the State Defense Committee the 16th 'Lithuanian' Rifle Division was formed in the area of Gorky (now Nizhny Novgorod) in the Moscow Military District. The nucleus of the unit consisted of Soviet officials and activists who had left the Lithuanian SSR (in 1942, only 1,458 soldiers of the division had previously fought on the Front of the Soviet–German War). Despite bearing the Lithuanian name, until July 1944 about 60% of its soldiers were Russians and Jews, while the Lithuanians accounted for only 40%. According to various sources, at times 50%, up to 80%, and even 85% of the division was Jewish. Due to this, the division was nicknamed "The division with the sixteen Lithuanians". As the Soviet military wanted to preserve the Lithuanian character of the division, there was a policy of sending Jews to fight and keeping Lithuanians behind the front. As a result, 90% of the division's casualties were Jews. The 16th Rifle Division did not live up to Joseph Stalin's expectations. Its soldiers were considered unreliable, were simply starving, and were not allowed on the front lines, thus there was frustration in the division, and the number of desertions increased. The Soviet intelligence emphasized in secret reports that the most critical about the Communist Party and the Red Army were Lithuanians.

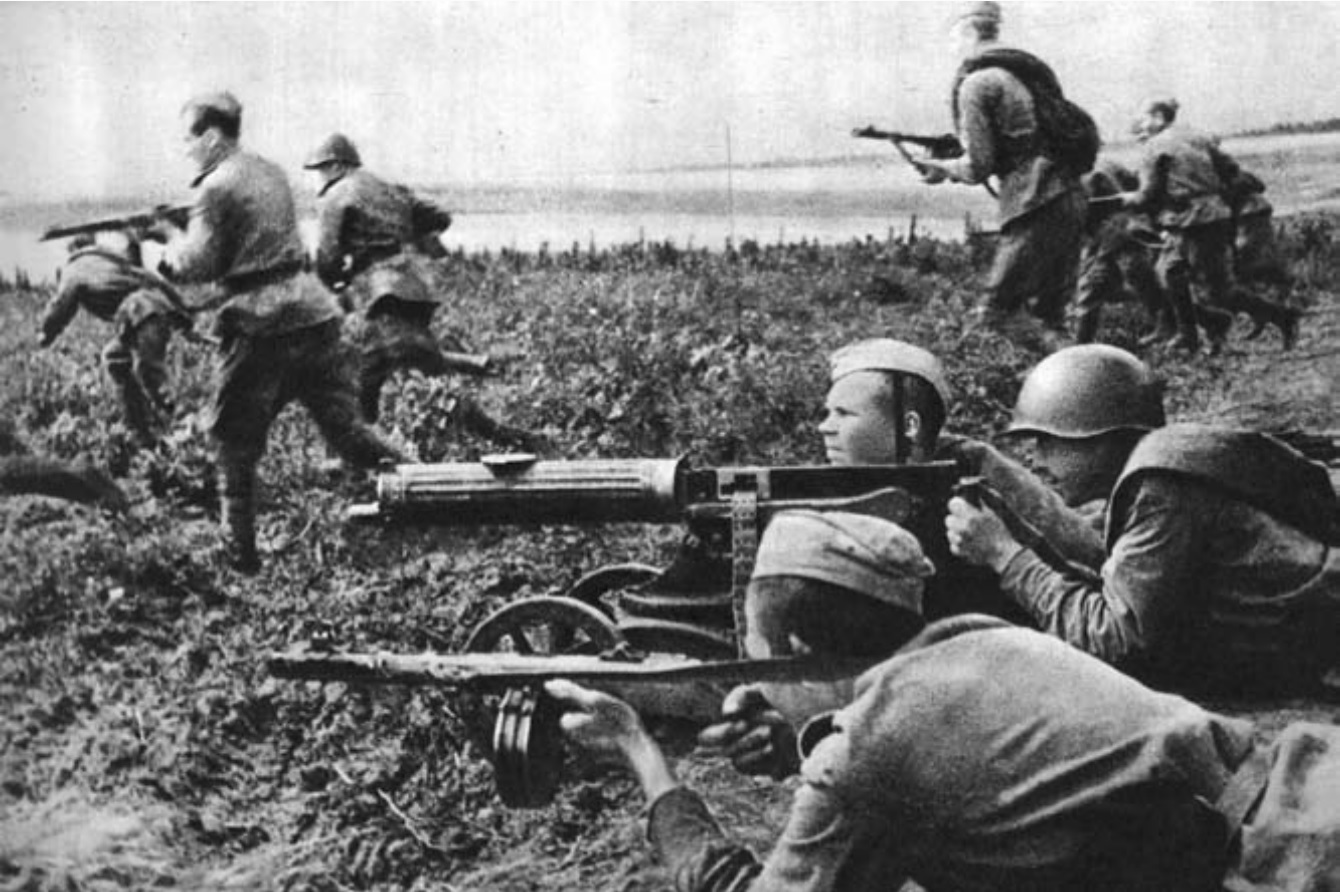
Soldiers of the 16th Rifle Division participating in fighting in the Oryol Oblast in the summer of 1943

In 20 February 1943 – 20 March 1943, the 16th Rifle Division participated in its first battles near Alexeyevka in the Oryol Oblast. The pompous escort of the division was attended by Antanas Sniečkus himself. When the German intelligence learned that the Lithuanians were confronting them, the Germans were playing Maironis' folk song Už Raseinių ant Dubysos (English: Beyond Raseiniai on Dubysa) through the speakers during the breaks between the battles. The poorly prepared division (poor supply, incompetent commanders, soldiers tired after the long march in harsh conditions, underestimation of the resistance of the Germans) lost about 5,000 out of more than 9,900 soldiers. The Soviet leadership acknowledged that the division was unprepared for the fighting and that it tarnished its name. Reinforced by the former battalion of discipline and a disciplinary company, the division repulsed attacks of the Germans at the Battle of Kursk (63 soldiers were killed and 136 injured). At the end of 1943, reinforced with artillery, mortars, flamethrowers, the division unsuccessfully attacked the Germans at Ezerische in the Haradok District, and after losing about 1,600 soldiers switched to defense. In order to preserve the losing division as a national unit, it was transferred to the 4th Assault Army Reserve and did not take part in the battles.

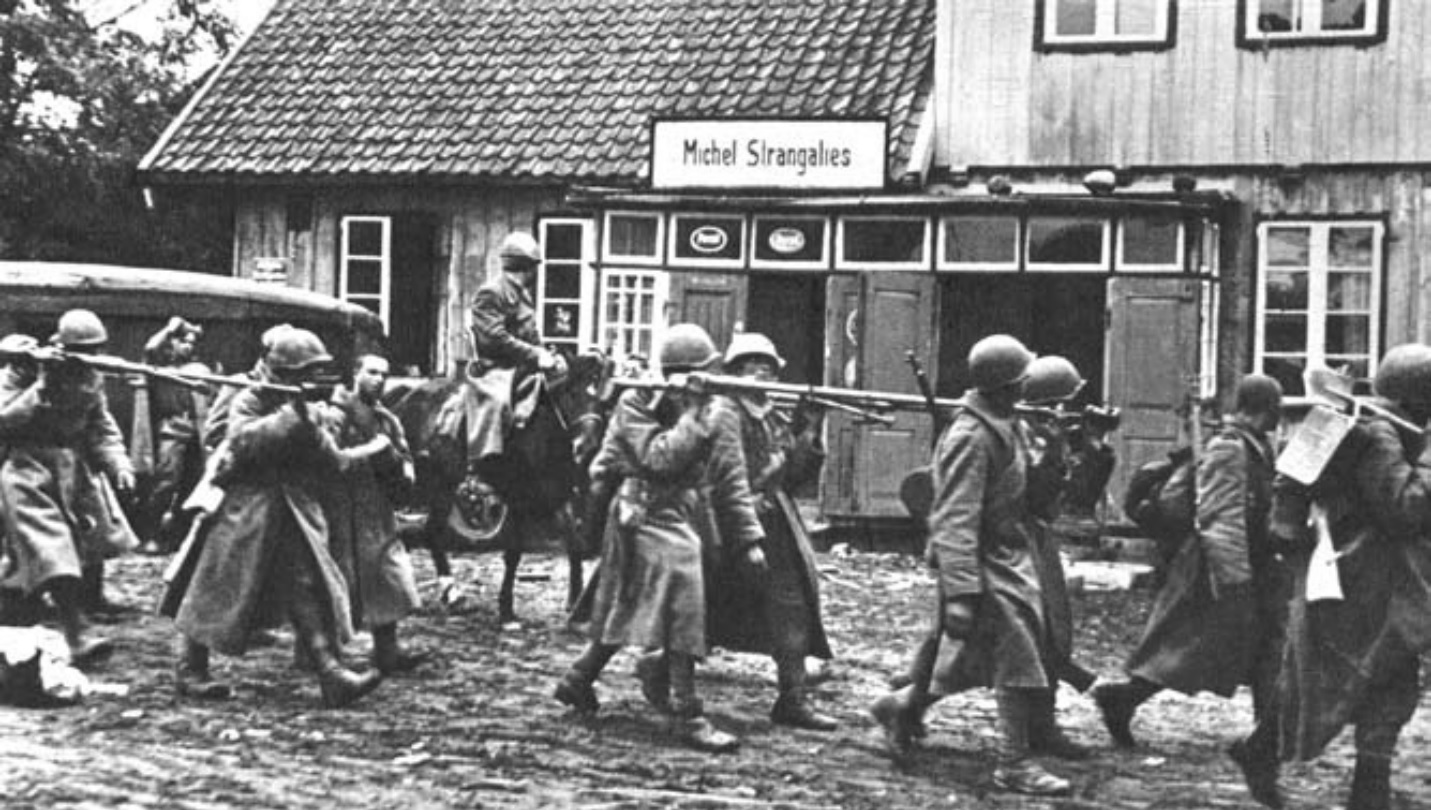
Soldiers of the 16th Rifle Division marching through the village of Stoniškiai in October 1944

On 13 February 1944, Lithuanian officers, serving in the 16th Rifle Division, signed an appeal to the Lithuanian officers remaining in Lithuania in which they urged them not to fight with the approaching Red Army. In the case of the Germans lose, the Lithuanian Territorial Defense Force, commanded by Povilas Plechavičius, was planning to militarily confront the returning Red Army in the territory of Lithuania, however it was liquidated sooner due to disagreements with the Germans, and Plechavičius, the headquarters of the armed forces, and some other officers were arrested by the Gestapo and taken to the Salaspils concentration camp. In July 1944, the 16th Rifle Division entered the territory of Lithuania. By the end of 1944, it had been supplemented by more than 10,000 men (about 10% of all forcibly mobilized in Lithuania). Since August 1944, the division participated in the battles near Šiauliai and in the Battle of Memel. In 1944, it was transferred to Courland (about 3,580 soldiers were killed there). Soldiers of the division, being in Lithuania and Latvia, deserted when the opportunities arose. In 1945, the division (following the battle, given the name of Klaipėda) was deployed in Vilnius. In 1948, it was transformed into the 44th Separate Rifle Brigade, but in 1950 it became a division again. In May 1956, it was disbanded.

Overall, the 16th Rifle Division proved to be non-combat and unprofessional unit in the Soviet–German War, unable to compensate for the losses with so-called national personnel. The division did not become a true military unit, but a propaganda unit. Despite the requests of the Lithuanian SSR leadership, the division was not completed and strengthened enough to fully take part in the struggle for the retaking of the territory of Lithuania. Eventually, the division's participation in the World War II was used by the Soviet propaganda for the purposes of the occupation of Lithuania.
