= Klemensas Popeliučka =

Brigadier general Klemensas Popeliučka
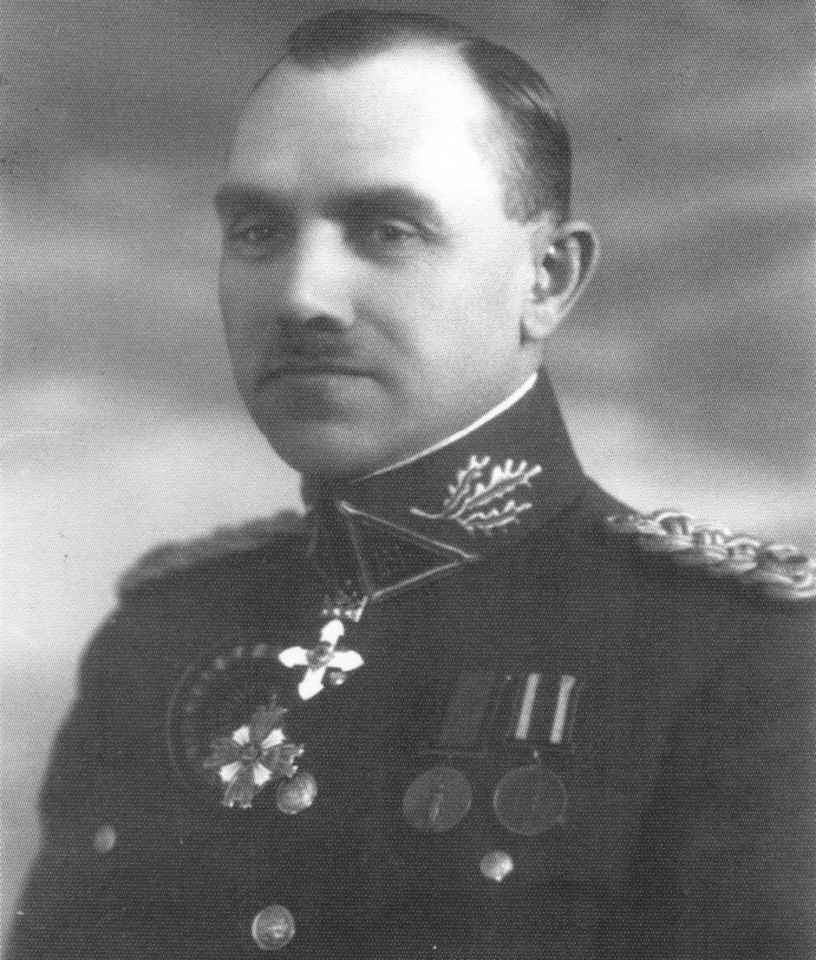
- Popeliučka photographed with uniform of the Brigadier General of the Lithuanian Army and state awards
- Born: 29 June 1892; Bučiūnai, Pašvitinys County, Russian Empire
- Died: 25 October 1948 (aged 56); Oberammergau, Bavaria, Germany
- Burial place: Augsburg, Germany
- Education: Kyiv Institute of Technology (1912), Petrograd School of Military Engineering (1916), War School of Kaunas (1923), École spéciale militaire de Saint-Cyr (1929)
- Military career
- Allegiance: Imperial Russian Army (1913–1917); Lithuanian Armed Forces (1919–1940)
- Service years: 1913–1940
- Rank: Brigadier general
- Awards: 2nd and 3rd class Orders of Saint Stanislaus; 2nd, 3rd, and 4th class Orders of Saint Anna; 4th class Cross of St. George; Medal of Independence of Lithuania (1928); Latvian Liberation War 10th Anniversary Participants Medal (1928); Commander's Cross of the Order of the Lithuanian Grand Duke Gediminas (1929); Commander's Cross of the Order of Vytautas the Great (1933)
- Other work: Teacher

Klemensas Popeliučka (29 June 1892 – 25 October 1948) was a Lithuanian brigadier general, teacher. He was Chief of Military Equipment Staff of the Lithuanian Armed Forces from 1929 to 1940.

Popeliučka, being a highly educated and broad-profile expert in military technology, largely contributed in creating the Lithuanian Armed Forces. Moreover, he was known for his devotion to his homeland, attached to his family, not consuming alcohol.

== Early years ==
Popeliučka was born in Bučiūnai village, Pašvitinys County, Russian Empire. In 1912, he graduated from the Šiauliai Gymnasium.

Since 1912 Popeliučka studied at the Department of Transportation of the Kyiv Institute of Technology. In 1913 he was mobilized into the Imperial Russian Army, participated in World War I, and was wounded in action. For his bravery on the front, he was awarded the Cross of St. George. In 1916, he graduated from the Petrograd School of Military Engineering.

== Interwar Lithuania ==
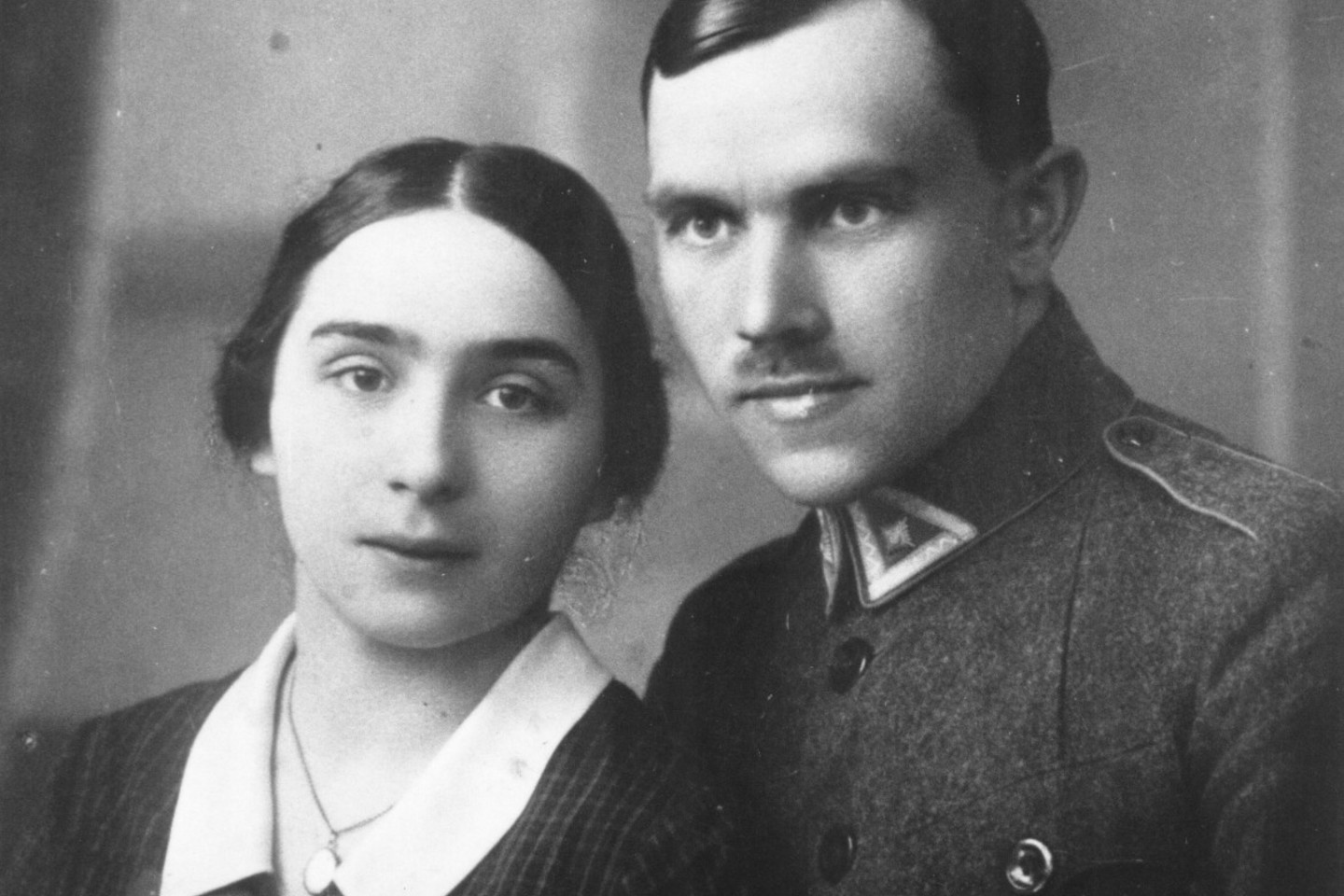
Popeliučka with his wife Vanda

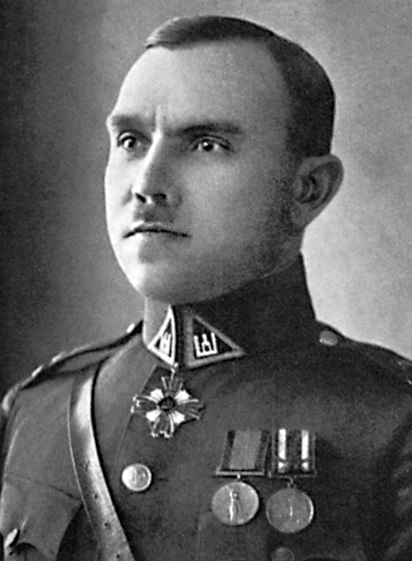
Popeliučka with the Lithuanian Army uniform

After returning to Lithuania, Popeliučka in April 1919 was mobilized into the Lithuanian Armed Forces. Since March 1920, he was the commander of a separate railway battalion, from March 1922 he was confirmed as the commander of the battalion.

In August 1920, Popeliučka led the commission in handing over the Švenčionėliai and Pabradė railway stations to Lithuania from Russian SFSR.

Popeliučka married Vanda Bohdanavičiūtė.

In 1923, Popeliučka graduated from the Higher Officers' Courses at War School of Kaunas.

Since January 1924, Popeliučka was the Chief of Staff of the Military Technical Board. Since May 1925, he was Inspector of Military Equipment of the Chief Defence Staff, since July 1927 Chief of the Military Equipment Staff.

Since August 1927, he studied at the École spéciale militaire de Saint-Cyr and gained the qualification of an engineer. Since April 1929 he was once again appointed as the Chief of the Military Equipment Staff, since August 1929 – Chief of Military Equipment.

In 1935, Popeliučka led the Board of Military Equipment, the First Engineering Battalion in Kaunas, the Second Engineering Battalion in Šeduva, the Armored Team in Radviliškis, the Communications Battalion, the Car Team in Kaunas, and the Lithuanian warship Prezidentas Smetona in Klaipėda.

Popeliučka has often wrote on various matters in journals Mūsų žinynas, Karys, Jūra, and other publications.

In 1936, Popeliučka was awarded the military rank of brigadier general.

== Occupations and World War II ==
Following the Soviet occupation of Lithuania in 1940, Popeliučka was fired from the Lithuanian Armed Forces in June 1940. In 1941–1944, he worked as a teacher in Kaunas.

Soon after graduating from the gymnasium, Tadas, the only talented and well-educated sixteen-year-old son of Popeliučka, suddenly became ill with meningitis. As the Soviets had taken all the more valuable medicines from Lithuania, they were unable to save their son and his death was a devastating blow for the parents.

== Emigration ==
In the summer of 1944 when the Soviet forces were re-occupying Lithuania, Popeliučka avoided political repressions and fled to Germany. He lived in Augsburg and following his death on 25 October 1948 was buried there.

== Legacy ==
In 2003, professor Vitolis Trušys painted a portrait of Popeliučka, which was donated to the Vytautas the Great War Museum.

In 2015, Gintaras Lučinskas published book Lietuvos kariuomenės brigados generolas Klemensas Popeliučka.
