= Antanas Stapulionis =

Lithuanian officer

Lieutenant colonel Antanas Stapulionis
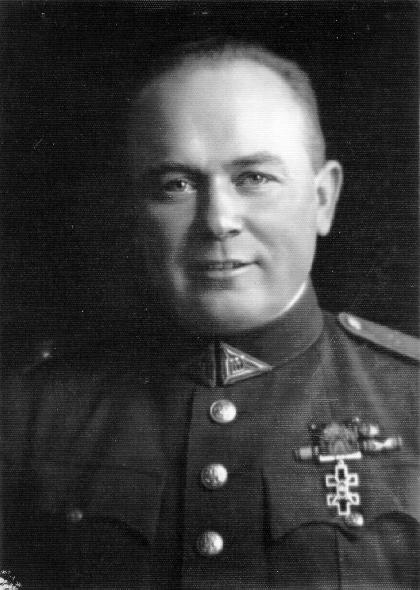
- Stapulionis with uniform of the Lithuanian Army
- Born: December 6, 1893; Gustoniai, Joniškėlis County
- Died: July 3, 1978 (aged 84); Florida, United States
- Burial place: Joniškėlis, Lithuania
- Education: War School of Irkutsk
- Military career
- Allegiance: Imperial Russian Army (1914–1917); Lithuanian Armed Forces (1919–1940); Rebels of the June Uprising (1941)
- Service years: 1914–1941
- Rank: Lieutenant Colonel
- Awards: Knight's Cross of the Order of the Cross of Vytis (1920); Commander's Cross of the Order of the Lithuanian Grand Duke Gediminas (1929); Order of Star of the Lithuanian Riflemen's Union (1938); Officer's Cross of the Order of Vytautas the Great (1938)

Antanas Stapulionis (December 6, 1893 – July 3, 1978) was a Lithuanian lieutenant colonel and chief of the Panevėžys Staff of the June Uprising in Lithuania.

== Early life ==
Stapulionis was born on December 6, 1893, in Gustoniai, Joniškėlis County, he studied at Joniškėlis Agricultural School and Kaunas Teachers' Seminary Saulė.

== World War I ==
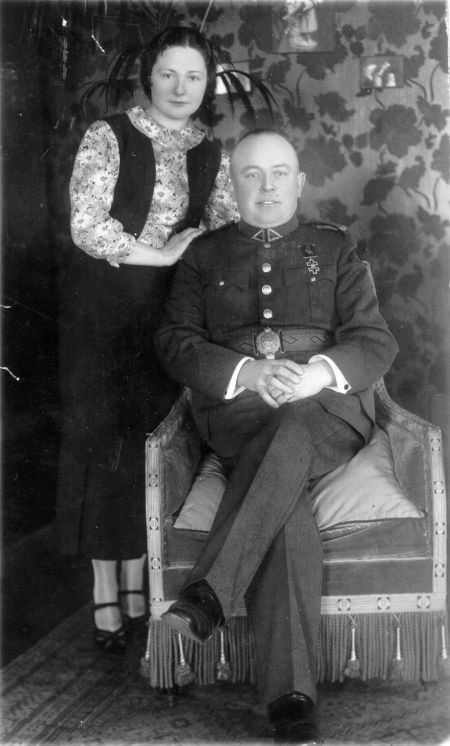
Stapulionis with his wife

Stapulionis was mobilized to the Imperial Russian Army at the outbreak of World War I and studied at the Irkutsk military school, which he graduated in December 1915. Stapulionis fought on the Eastern front, especially the Daugavpils, Romanian and Austrian sectors.

== Lithuanian Wars of Independence and the Interwar ==
Following World War I, Stapulionis returned to Lithuania and on 23 November 1918 he joined the secret organization of Lithuanian partisans in Joniškėlis in which he on 5 April 1919 became the Chief of Staff and on 14 May 1919 he became the Commander of Joniškėlis Battalion. The battalion together with the Panevėžys group units fought with the Bolsheviks near Vabalninkas, Pušalotas, Saločiai, Daugava.

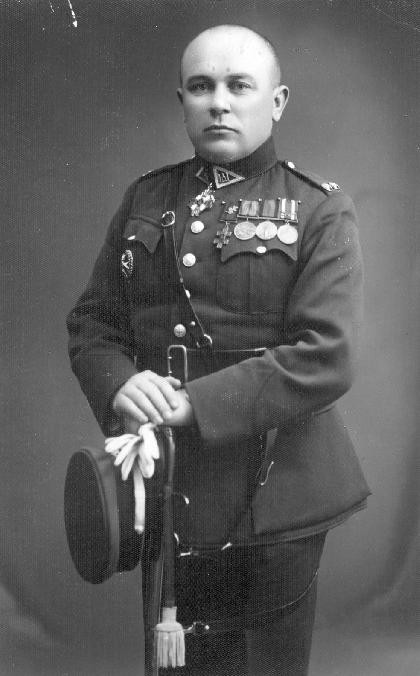
Stapulionis during the interwar period

Afterwards the battalion joined the Lithuanian Armed Forces and became the Joniškėlis Battalion, Stapulionis was transferred to the 3rd Infantry Regiment as assistant commander, later also serving as assistant commander in the 6th and 7th Infantry Regiments. Stapulionis was the military commandant in Tauragė (1927) and since 1930 in Ukmergė and Panevėžys.

Stapulionis served in the Lithuanian Armed Forces until 1940 and was awarded the Knight's Cross of the Order of the Cross of Vytis (1920), Commander's Cross of the Order of the Lithuanian Grand Duke Gediminas (1929), Order of Star of the Lithuanian Riflemen's Union (1938), Officer's Cross of the Order of Vytautas the Great (1938).

== World War II ==
=== June Uprising ===
On 23 June 1941, the June Uprising began in Panevėžys County. On 25 June 1941, the Panevėžys Staff of the June Uprising was established in the city which was headed by Antanas Stapulionis. One of the staff's tasks was to ensure order in the city, hence Antanas Stapulionis issued orders stating that robbers be shot on the spot, and that all signs of Soviet rule were to be removed. Moreover, scouts were sent to all roads leading from the city and on 25 June, due to the rebel initiative, Piniavos Bridge and food factory Maistas were demined. Already on 27 June, Panevėžys was full of Lithuanian Tricolor flags and there were no serious clashes with the retreating Red Army in the city or its surroundings. However, on 27 June, the Wehrmacht entered Panevėžys and the Germans liquidated the staff of the rebels by the end of June.

In 1944, Stapulionis departed from Lithuania.

== After World War II ==
In 1949 Stapulionis arrived to the United States. He died on 3 July 1978 in Florida, United States. Stapulionis was reburied in Joniškėlis on 27 May 1995. The author of his tombstone is architect Vytautas Brėdikis.
