= Battle of Saločiai (1703) =

1703 Battle in the Great Northern War

- Part of the Great Northern War
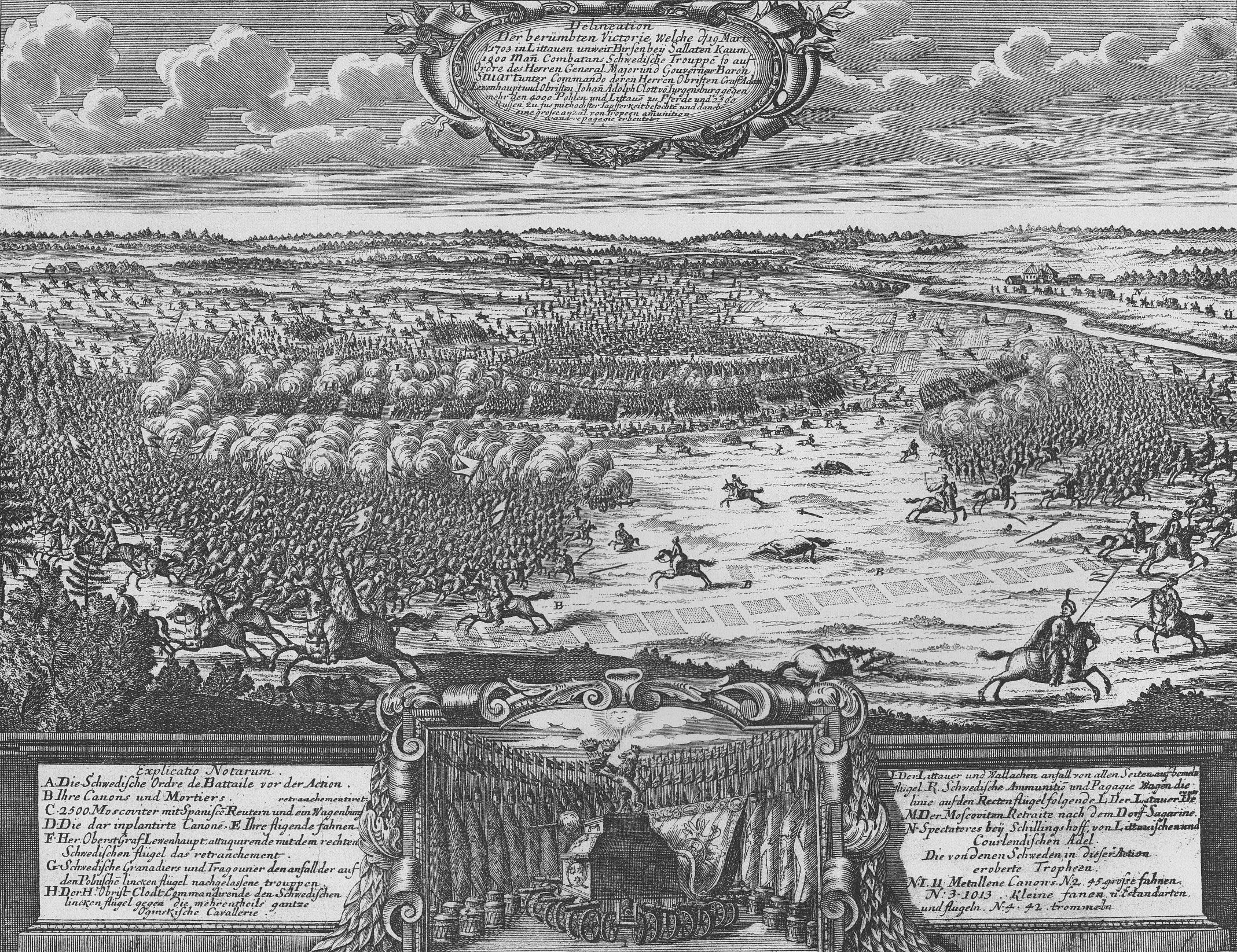
- Battle of Saladen, 1703
Date	18 March 1703 (O.S.); 19 March 1703 (Swedish calendar); 29 March 1703 (N.S.)
Location	Šakarniai, near Saločiai (now Lithuania) 56°14′55″N 24°21′42″E
Result	Swedish victory

Belligerents
(yes) Swedish Empire	Polish-Lithuanian Commonwealth; Tsardom of Russia

Commanders and leaders
(Swedish Empire) Adam Ludwig Lewenhaupt	(Polish–Lithuanian Commonwealth) Grzegorz Antoni Ogiński

Strength
1,100 men	6,000 men

Casualties and losses
40 killed 125 wounded 2 missing	>650–600 killed or around 1,500 killed some 45 standards and 1,058 banners

The Battle of Saločiai, or Battle of Saladen, was a military engagement that took place on 19 March 1703 near Saločiai, Lithuania during the Great Northern War. Despite being heavily outnumbered, the Swedish, under command of Lewenhaupt, managed to crush the combined Russo-Lithuanian Army while taking very few casualties. After the battle the Russians were forced to retreat. The battle followed the pattern of upset Swedish victories in the Great Northern War. After the battle, Count Lewenhaupt decided to remain in Swedish controlled Lithuanian instead of chasing the Russian army, since his force was so small.

== Battle ==
The Swedish Army crossed the river Mūša, and then deployed on the top of a hill. The allied army of Lithuanians and Russians deployed with the Lithuanians on their right flank and the Russians on the left. The Russian units under commander Oginski were veterans from Russian wars with the Ottomans. They placed supply wagons in front of them to ward off a potential Swedish cavalry charge. In contrast, the Lithuanians on the right flank were recruits. Commander Lewenhaupt knew that if he stayed at his defensive position on the hill he would be overrun by his enemies superior numbers. He elected for a hyper-aggressive strategy of attacking the allies. His two flanks marched forwards towards the enemy. The Russians on the Swedish right flank (The Allied left flank) shot at the Swedes. Since the Swedish were climbing a hill at the top of which was the Russian force, the Russian volleys were ineffective. In contrast, Swedish shots were quite deadly. On the other side of the battle, the green Lithuanians faced veteran Swedish Grenadiers. Chaos fell in the Lithuanian lines, and they were routed. Their commander managed to briefly regain control of the Lithuanian units, and they smashed into the Swedish right flank, who were now fighting both contingents of the allied army. The Swedish left flank was reorganizing their units when they realized the dire situation that the right flank was in. They charged at the Lithuanians again and destroyed them with grenades. Swedish pikemen boasted having particularly long pikes, which outranged the Russians and therefore allowed for Swedish units to kill Russian soldiers while taking no casualties. This happened at Saločiai.

== Sources ==
- Velikanov, Vladimir S. (2018). Русский вспомогательный корпус на Польско-Саксонской службе в 1704-1707 и сражение при Фрауштадте [The Russian Auxiliary Corps in Polish-Saxon service in 1704-1707 and the Battle of Fraustadt] (in Russian). Russian Academy of Sciences: Ratnoe delo. Moscow: Русские витязи. ISBN 978-5-6040158-5-8.
