= 9th Infantry Regiment (Lithuania) =

Former Lithuanian Army formation (1919–40)

9th Infantry Regiment of the Lithuanian Duke Vytenis
- 9-asis pėstininkų Lietuvos kunigaikščio Vytenio pulkas
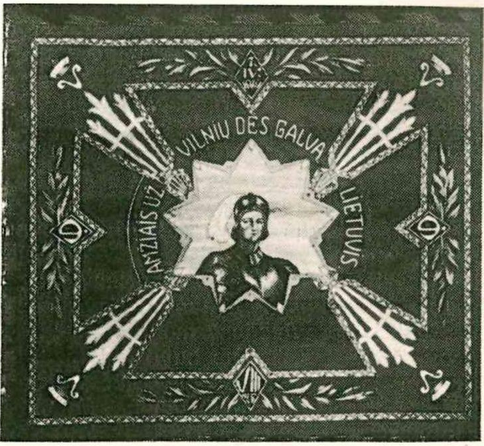
- The regiment's flag, which it received on 22 September 1929
- Active: December 10, 1919 – December 1940
- Country: Lithuania
- Branch: Lithuanian Army
- Type: Infantry
- Patron: Lithuanian Duke Vytenis
- Anniversaries: August 26 (instituted in 1927)

The 9th Infantry Regiment (Lithuanian: 9-asis pėstininkų pulkas), later the 9th Infantry Regiment of the Lithuanian Duke Vytenis (Lithuanian: 9-asis pėstininkų Lietuvos kunigaikščio Vytenio pulkas) was an infantry regiment that served in the Lithuanian Army during the Interwar period. The battalion successfully fought against the invading Bolsheviks during the Lithuanian Wars of Independence. The regiment was founded on 20 May 1919.

During the Lithuanian Wars of Independence, a total of 28 soldiers were killed and 50 soldiers were wounded. The Order of the Cross of Vytis was awarded to 15 officers and 33 soldiers of the regiment.

== Formation ==
When the Germans retreated from Joniškėlis in December 1918, the county committee instructed officer Kazilionis to organize a militia. By January 1919, there was a militia unit of 8-10 people in each valsčius of the Joniškėlis county.

== Lithuanian–Soviet War ==
The Bolsheviks occupied Joniškėlis on 22 January 1919, but they were disarmed by the local militia two months later, on March 22. On April 5, a defence staff was formed, which intended to coordinate the actions of the different militia units. Since then, the militia began to be called the partisans. The larger battles in which they fought were the battle near the villages of Bernatoniai and Ančiškiai (also known as Unciškės) on April 8, near Saločiai on April 27 and near Joniškėlis on May 1. On May 19, the battalion was called the Separate Partisan Death Battalion (Lithuanian: Atskiras partizanų mirties batalionas). However, the next day, on May 20, these partisans were called the Separate Partisan Battalion (Lithuanian: Atskiras partizanų batalionas). The Separate Partisan Battalion's commander was officer Antanas Stapulionis.

In the beginning of June, the battalion moved to Panevėžys, where it was strengthened by new recruits and so lost its partisan character. On June 20, it was reorganised as the Joniškėlis Battalion (Lithuanian: Joniškėlio batalionas) and Aleksandras Jakaitis was made its commander. The battalion was moved to the front on August 18, and from the end of August, the battalion fought against the Bolsheviks on the Dauguva front. On December 7, the battalion was moved to Įlaukė, also known as Eglainė. On 10 December 1919, the Joniškėlis Battalion was made into the 9th Infantry Regiment. The regiment was composed of three battalions.

== Polish–Lithuanian War ==
In December 1919, when the 9th Infantry Regiment took over the front against the Polish Army several clashes took place in the vicinity of Turmantas railway station.

Brigades (later divisions) of the Lithuanian Army and the regiments within them on 13 January 1920
| Brigades (renamed as Divisions after February 10) | Regiments |
|---|---|
| 1st Brigade | 1st Infantry Regiment of the Lithuanian Grand Duke Gediminas |
| 1st Brigade | 4th Infantry Regiment of the Lithuanian King Mindaugas |
| 1st Brigade | 7th Infantry Regiment of the Samogitian Duke Butigeidis |
| 2nd Brigade | 2nd Infantry Regiment of the Lithuanian Grand Duke Algirdas |
| 2nd Brigade | 5th Infantry Regiment (later of the Lithuanian Grand Duke Kęstutis) |
| 2nd Brigade | 8th Infantry Regiment (later of the Duke of Kaunas Vaidotas) |
| 3rd Brigade | 3rd Infantry Regiment (later of the Lithuanian Grand Duke Vytautas) |
| 3rd Brigade | 6th Infantry Regiment of the Duke of Pilėnai Margiris |
| 3rd Brigade | 9th Infantry Regiment (later of the Lithuanian Duke Vytenis) |
| 3rd Brigade | Belarusian Battalion (Lithuanian: Baltgudžių batalionas) |

The regiment officially received its official name of the Lithuanian Duke Vytenis on 16 February 1920.

=== Autumn 1920 ===
On September 28, two of the regiment's battalions were moved to Vilnius, while the third one remained to guard the Latvia–Lithuania and Lithuania–Russia borders. When the Poles broke the Suwałki Agreement, the two battalions in Vilnius moved to the Pagiriai-Kinalaukė front and defended Vilnius against Żeligowski's Mutiny. On October 9, under attack and under threat of encirclement by Żeligowski's troops, the two battalions retreated to the line Bajorai-Didžioji Riešė. During October 9–21, the regiment was fighting to the left of the road Maišiagala-Vilnius. On October 21, after a breakthrough by the Polish cavalry towards Širvintos, the 9th Infantry Regiment retreated to the other side of Neris river through Kernavė. Regardless, it soon reassembled in the region of Novosiolka-Kriaunaitiškiai until October 27. In November 1920, the 9th Infantry Regiment fought in various operations near Molėtai, Širvintos and Giedraičiai. In November 1920, the Lithuanian Army was reorganised, and the 9th Infantry Regiment of the Lithuanian Duke Vytenis was assigned to the 1st Infantry Division.

Remembrance of the 9th Infantry Regiment at Giedraičiai

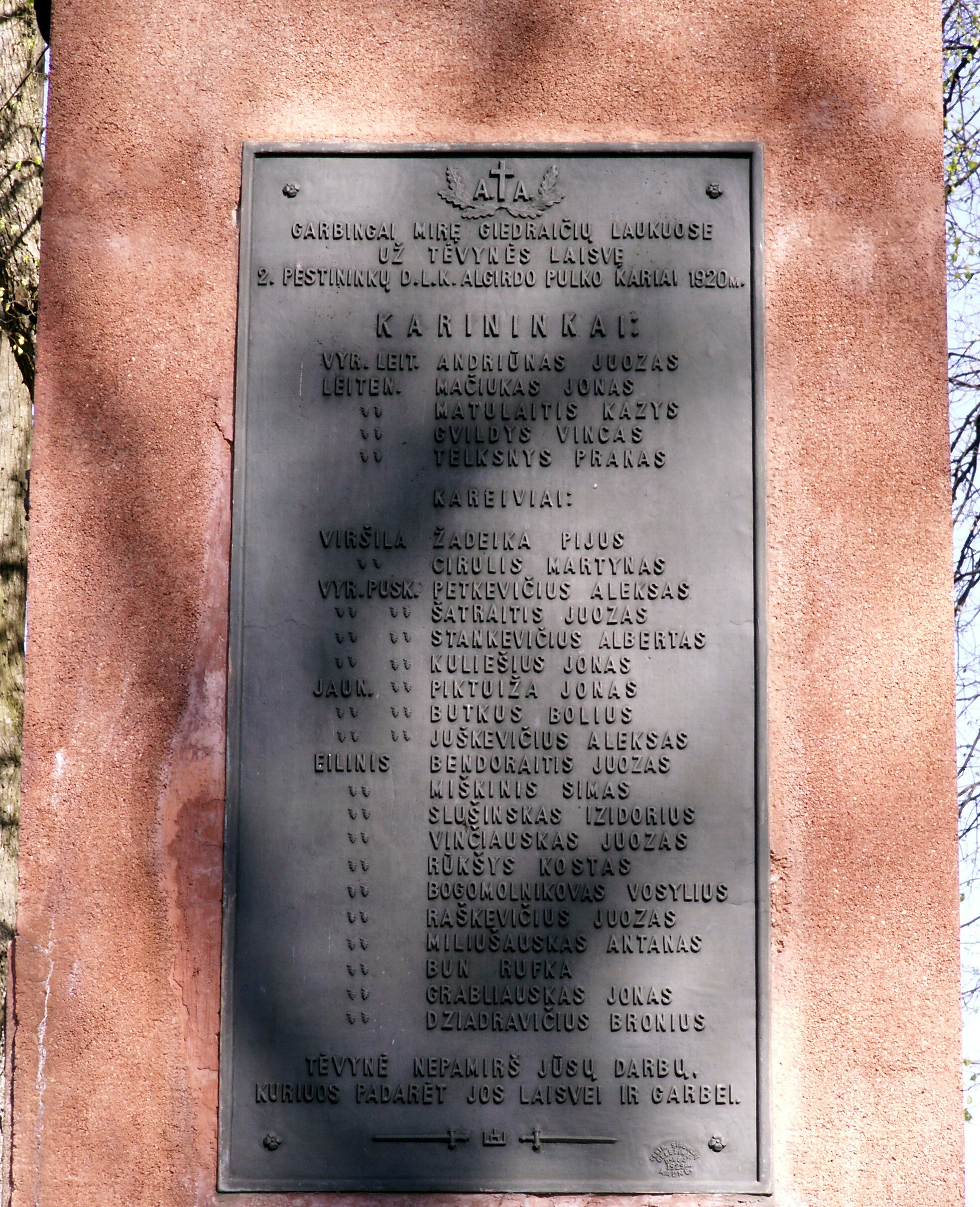
List of the 9th Infantry Regiment's officers and soldiers killed at Giedraičiai

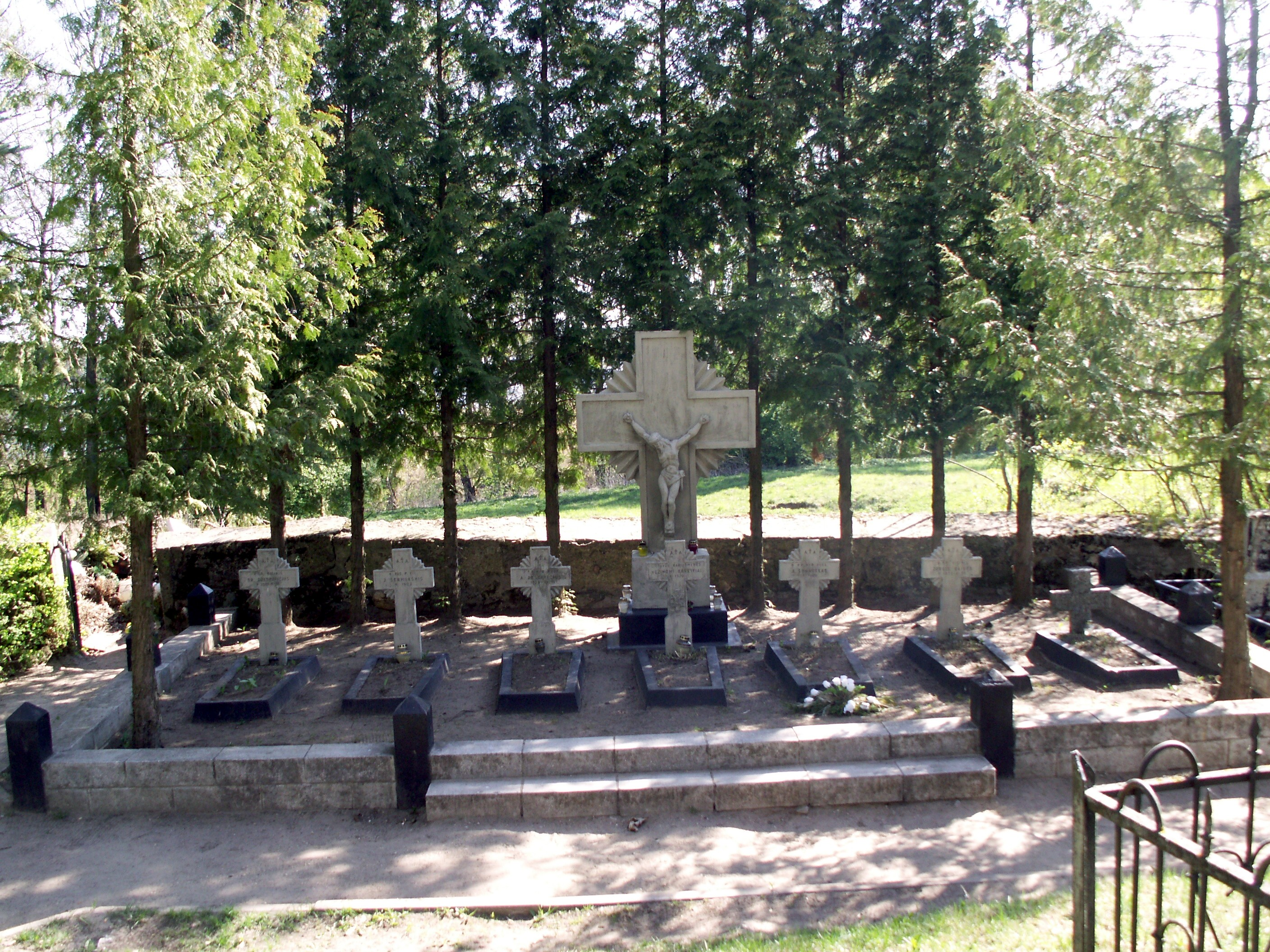
Tombs of the 9th Infantry Regiment's soldiers in Giedraičiai

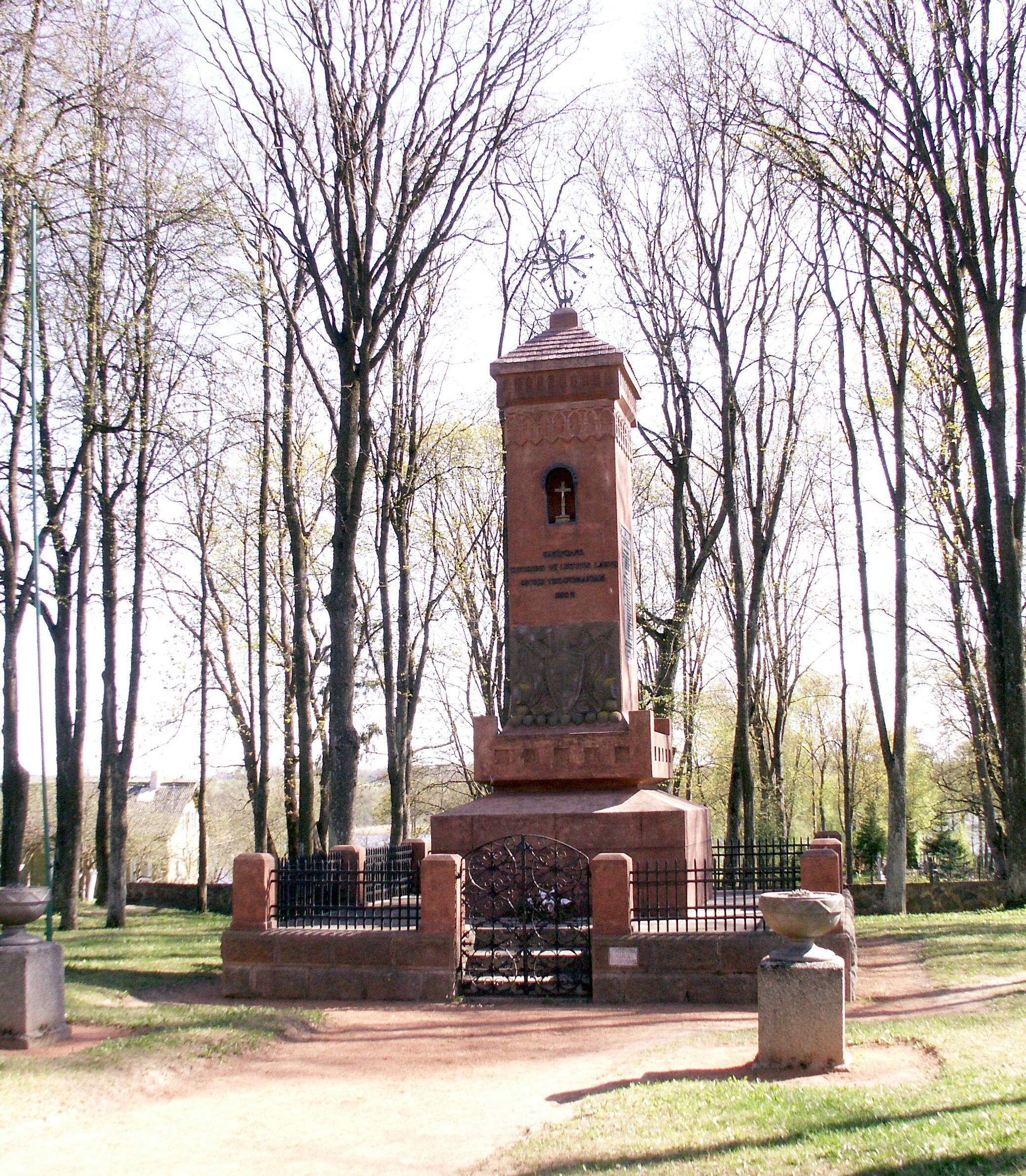
Monument to the 9th Infantry Regiment's soldiers in Giedraičiai

== Interwar ==
After active combat ended, the unit was concentrated in Utena and departed to Žasliai district on December 5. The regiment protected the demarcation line against Polish soldiers at the line Daugirdiškės–Kazokiškės near Žasliai until 24 October 1921. On October 24, the regiment was moved to Panemunė. Soon, the regiment was sent back to the same line in June 1922. On 1 May 1923, the regiment was moved to Marijampolė, where it was stationed throughout the interwar.

In 1927, the regiment's annual celebration day was set for August 26. On 22 September 1929, the regiment was presented with a flag with the inscription: "Amžiais už Vilnių dės galvą lietuvis" (The Lithuanian will lay down his head for Vilnius for ages).

== 1940 ==
On 15 June 1940, the regiment executed the verbal order of the Minister of Defence Kazys Musteikis to retreat towards Germany, however, the regiment was returned to Marijampolė. Karolis Dabulevičius was assigned as the regiment's commander, but he was replaced with Vladas Strimavičius after continuing unruliness in the regiment. The regiment's official name was removed on 25 July 1940, with the name being just 9th Infantry Regiment. After the Lithuanian People's Army was incorporated into the Red Army, the regiment was disbanded, with many of its officers and soldiers being repressed. It is unclear when the regiment was disbanded, but it was disbanded some time in December 1940.

== Regiment's commanders ==
The regiment's commanders were Aleksandras Jakaitis, Major Antanas Paškovičius, Lieutenant colonel Vincas Vitkauskas, Colonel Petras Jurgaitis, Edvardas Adamkavičius, Aleksandras Svylas, Antanas Gaušas, Karolis Dabulevičius, Vladas Strimavičius.

== Bibliography ==
=== Books ===
- Lesčius, Vytautas (2004). Lietuvos Kariuomenė Nepriklausomybės Kovose 1918–1920 (PDF) (in Lithuanian). Vilnius: Generolo Jono Žemaičio Lietuvos karo akademija. ISBN 9955-423-23-4.
- Surgailis, Gintautas (2023). Devintasis pėstininkų Lietuvos kunigaikščio Vytenio pulkas (PDF). Lietuvos kariuomenės istorija (in Lithuanian). Vilnius: Generolo Jono Žemaičio Lietuvos karo akademija. ISBN 978-609-8277-39-5.
- Ruzgas, Vincas, ed. (1932). "VIII. Krašto apsauga". Visa Lietuva: Informacinė knyga 1931 m. (in Lithuanian). Kaunas: Spaudos Fondas.

=== Encyclopedias ===
- Steponaitis, Vytautas (1937). "Devintas pėst. Liet. Kun. Vytenio pulkas". In Biržiška, Vaclovas (ed.). Lietuviškoji enciklopedija (in Lithuanian). Vol. VI: Darbininkų žodis - Drugenis. Kaunas: Spaudos Fondas. pp. 542–543.
- Jasulaitis, Vytautas (2022). "Devintasis pėstininkų pulkas". Visuotinė lietuvių enciklopedija (in Lithuanian). Archived from the original on 2022-03-23.

=== Other ===
- Vydrina, Elena (2008). "lcva fondo 522 pažyma". www.archyvai.lt (in Lithuanian). Archived from the original on 2022-03-23.
