= Antanas Gaušas =

Lithuanian military person

Colonel Antanas Gaušas
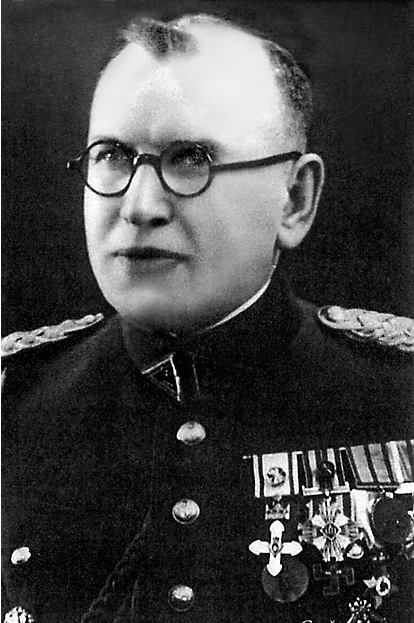
- Gaušas photographed with uniform of the Lithuanian Army and state awards
- Born: 24 December 1901; Odesa, Russian Empire
- Died: March 15, 1964 (aged 62); Chicago, United States
- Burial place: Saint Casimir Catholic Cemetery
- Education: War School of Kaunas (1919), Panevėžys Forest Technology School (1926), Academy of the General Staff of Prague (1933)
- Military career
- Allegiance: Lithuanian Armed Forces (1919–1940)
- Service years: 1919–1940
- Rank: Colonel of the General Staff
- Awards: Officer's Cross of the Order of the Lithuanian Grand Duke Gediminas (1928); Officer's Cross of the Order of Vytautas the Great (1935)

Antanas Gaušas (24 December 1901 – 15 March 1964) was a Lithuanian military person, who became Colonel of the General Staff in 1937.

== Interwar Lithuanian Army ==
In January 1919, Gaušas enlisted in the Lithuanian Armed Forces as a volunteer. In 1919 he graduated from the War School of Kaunas, in 1922 from the Higher Officers' Courses, in 1926 from the Panevėžys Forest Technical School, in 1933 from the Prague General Staff Academy. Gaušas participated in the Lithuanian Wars of Independence with the Polish Armed Forces in 1920. In 1923 he led the liquidation of Polish partisan gangs operating in the Širvintos District Municipality. In 1923–31 he was company commander.

On 17 December 1926, Gaušas took part in the events of the 1926 Lithuanian coup d'état which resulted in removal of President Kazys Grinius from the office and Antanas Smetona was chosen as his replacement by the army. Starting in 1931 he worked at the Chief of Staff, and in August 1934 he became the head of the department. In November 1936 Gaušas became commander of the 9th Infantry Regiment, and from January 1937 onward he also was commander of the Marijampolė garrison.

== Occupation and World War II ==
On 15 June 1940, during the Soviet occupation of Lithuania in 1940, the 9th Infantry Regiment commanded by Gaušas withdrew towards the German border with a task to assist the departure of President Antanas Smetona abroad and if necessary confront the occupying Red Army with a gun, however a delegation sent by the Prime Minister Antanas Merkys convinced Gaušas and the regiment was returned to the barracks. On 16 June 1940 Gaušas was dismissed from the position of the regiment's commander and on 19 June 1940 – from the army. Seeking to avoid his arrest, Gaušas went into hiding from 22 June 1940 to 1941.

In March 1942 Gaušas became Commander of the Border Guard of the Interior Management, and in January 1943 Panevėžys County Governor.

== Emigration ==
In 1944 Gaušas left for Germany, and in 1949 he emigrated to the United States. On 15 March 1964 he died in the Billings Hospital in Chicago due to heart disease and was buried at Saint Casimir Catholic Cemetery.
