= Jonas Burba =

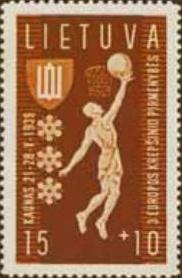
One of Burba's postage stamps, dedicated to EuroBasket 1939

Jonas Juozas Burba (February 1, 1907 – April 26, 1952) was an artist born in Skuodas, Lithuania. His notable works include Lithuanian postage stamps, the interwar design of the Order of Vytautas the Great and the Order of the Lithuanian Grand Duke Gediminas. During the Soviet occupation of Lithuania, Burba was deported to Siberia in 1941 as part of a mass targeting of artists by the Soviets.
