= Mikalojus Lipčius =

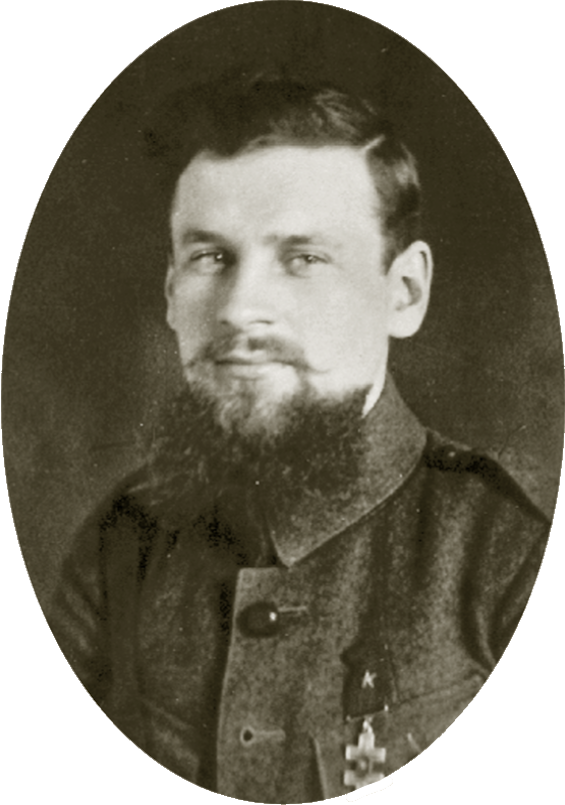

Vice-Minister of the Interior
- In office 25 March 1923 – 1924

Director of the finance department of the Ministry of Finance
- In office 1 September 1927 – 1 August 1940

Personal details
- Born: 19 December 1894 Bernotai, Kovno Governorate, Russian Empire
- Died: 25 June 1942 (aged 47) Pechora labour camp, Komi Republic, Soviet Union
- Spouse: Marija Lipčienė-Marcinkevičiūtė
- Children: 2
- Education: Russian State Agrarian University; Vytautas Magnus University

Military service
- Allegiance: Lithuania
- Years of service: 1919 (Lithuanian Army); 1919–1923 (Lithuanian intelligence services)

Mikalojus Lipčius (also known as Mikas or Mykolas; 19 December 1894 – 25 June 1942) was the head of interwar Lithuanian military intelligence services (1919–1923), Vice-Minister of the Interior (1923–1924), and director of the finance department of the Ministry of Finance (1927–1940).

== Early life ==
=== Early life and studies ===
Mikalojus Lipčius was born on 19 December 1893 in the village of Bernotai, then part of the Kovno Governorate of the Russian Empire. Through his mother Kotryna Lipčienė née Mačiulytė, Lipčius was nephew to the priest and poet Maironis. Lipčius attended the Betygala Primary School from 1901 to 1904, and the Palanga Middle School from 1904 to 1909. From 1909 to 1914, he attended a boy's gymnasium in Kaunas. He then studied at the Riga Polytechnic Institute from 1914 to 1916. From 1916 to 1918, he studied at the Russian State Agrarian University, where he met his future wife, the opera soloist Marija Lipčienė-Marcinkevičiūtė. The couple married on 16 February 1920 in Kaunas. They had two children, Algirdas and Aldona. Aldona was a pianist, while Algirdas was the father of the cellist Saulius Lipčius.

=== Lithuanian Wars of Independence ===
In July 1918, at the end of the First World War and the outbreak of the Lithuanian Wars of Independence, Lipčius returned to Lithuania. He joined the Lithuanian army on 30 December 1918. He served under Vincas Grigaliūnas-Glovackis in the 2nd Infantry Regiment. He diligently organized propaganda for the Lithuanian army to gather more volunteers. On 13 January 1919 he was assigned to the General Staff. He became a special affairs officer, a title given to covert military intelligence personnel.

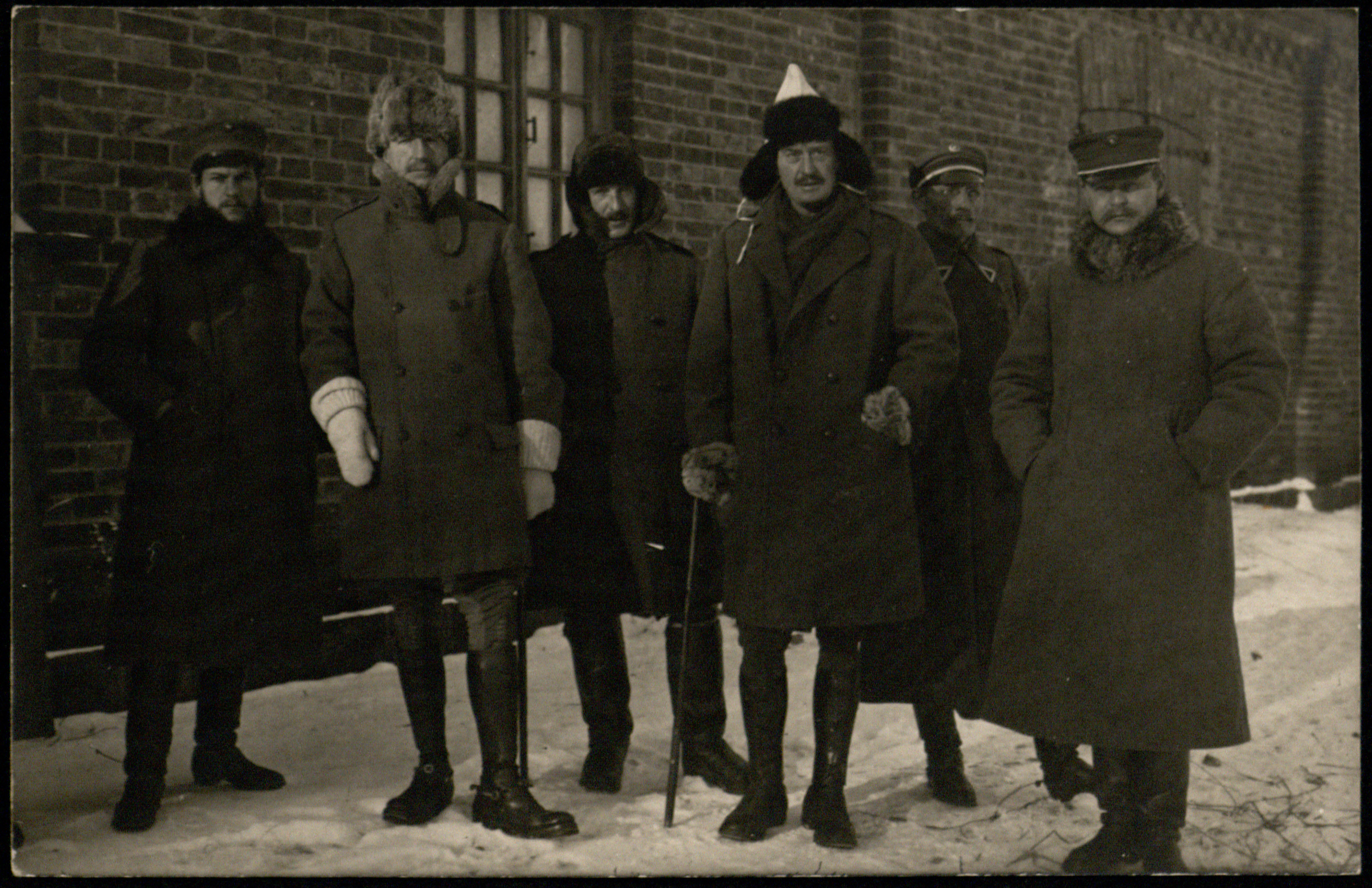
Lipčius (left) and Minister of Defense Antanas Merkys (right) with a British military mission, 1919

== Career ==
=== Head of intelligence ===
Soon after he became acquainted with the News Unit headed by Jonas Žilinskas. On 12 May 1919, the unit was renamed into the Unit of Intelligence, and two days later Lipčius was transferred to the unit as Žilinskas's deputy. As Žilinskas was ill and could not lead the unit, on 10 June Lipčius was made the temporary leader of the unit, and later the permanent leader on 12 July. However, Lipčius soon fell ill himself and had to be substituted by Liudas Gira. Lipčius's unit also participated in the discovery of the Polish Military Organisation's attempted coup of Lithuania. In 1921, he was awarded the Order of the Cross of Vytis, 1st degree. Under his leadership, an official statute of the intelligence agency was written, connections with Latvian intelligence services were made, and courses for intelligence officers began. Lipčius was the first to suggest that the intelligence unit should issue certificates of trust to people seeking employment in state institutions to prevent compromised persons from holding important positions. In 1922, Lipčius studied at Vytautas Magnus University.

==== Klaipėda Revolt ====
Lipčius helped organize the Klaipėda Revolt of 1923 by establishing intelligence gathering areas near the border with the Klaipėda Region, then a mandate of the League of Nations administered by the French. Lipčius recruited and closely worked with Jonas Budrys, who was the head of counter-intelligence. Budrys was sent to Klaipėda in 1922 to explore the possibility of a revolt.

=== Vice-Minister and director ===
On 25 March 1923, by the decree of president Aleksandras Stulginskis, Lipčius was made Vice-Minister of the Interior. Petras Kirlys succeeded Lipčius as head of the Lithuanian intelligence on 10 April. Within the Ministry, Lipčius helped establish a secret police independent of military intelligence and the Department of Civil Protection, which had the role of criminal police. Lipčius also issued the creation of the Criminal Police Department "B" (Kriminalinės policijos skyrius "B"). From 1924 to 1927, Lipčius received a government scholarship and studied at the Paris School of Political Sciences with specialty in state finance and administration. On 1 September 1927, Lipčius was appointed the director of the finance department at the Lithuanian Ministry of Finance. In 1936, he was awarded the Klaipėda Liberation Medal and Order of the Lithuanian Grand Duke Gediminas.

== Imprisonment and death ==
After Lithuania was occupied by the Soviet Union, Lipčius was arrested by Soviet authorities on 1 August 1940 and imprisoned in Kaunas and later Vilnius. He was sentenced to eight years of hard labour, and on 5 June 1941 was deported to Siberia to a camp near the Pechora river, where he died on 25 June 1942.
