= Union for the Defense of the Lithuanian Language =

The Union for the Defense of the Lithuanian Language (Lithuanian: Lietuvių kalbos gynimo sąjunga, LKGS) was a short-lived vigilante organization in Lithuania whose goal was to enforce correct usage of the Lithuanian language. It was founded in 1922 and disbanded after the right-wing victory in the 1923 Lithuanian parliamentary election, but it was an early forerunner of far-right organizations in interwar Lithuania.

== Formation and activity ==
The impetus for LKGS's formation was tension arising from linguistic conflict in newly independent Lithuania. Though the Lithuanian language was declared the state language of independent Lithuania, the majority of bureaucrats and inhabitants of the country's capital Kaunas continued to use the Russian language as lingua franca. In addition, though the number of street signs, printed press and Lithuanian-subtitled movies was increasing, they were often grammatically incorrect or outright incomprehensible.

LKGS was established in the second half of 1922. Its stated purpose was to ensure that citizens of Lithuania can communicate in Lithuanian everywhere in the country and stop the usage of "the language of Lenin and Trotsky in Lithuania". Its methods included publicizing real or imagined improper Lithuanian usage in the state bureaucracy, boycotts of offending private companies and street harassment. Generally, the organization's vigilante actions were ineffective. Movie theatres which showed movies subtitled in grammatically incorrect Lithuanian were vandalized with eggs. However, their actions were tolerated by the Kaunas police authorities, and even though it was unregistered and unregistered organizations were prohibited by law, it was allowed to operate.

On the night of 4–5 February 1923, the organization's activists smeared almost all non-Lithuanian signs in Kaunas with black paint, which prompted a negative reaction from Lithuanian politicians. Even the right-wing nationalist Party of National Progress condemned the vandalism, describing it as "an unwise and even anti-state action". However, little action was done against them. In March 1923, the incident was also claimed by the previously unknown "Lithuanian Fascist Executive Committee", whose proclamation claimed:

We warn everyone and every person that the cleansing of Lithuania's face from the stains of Jewish Babylonia is not the action of children, immatures or "hooligans", how our enemies dare to claim and wish. <...> With the powerful hand of the nation, we will prove to the parasitic, forgetful and insolent scumbags that Lithuania is a Lithuanian state, and not a little republic of ethnic minorities, which they claim and baptize. THE GOVERNMENT - Do not let the internal enemy, hiding behind the mask of minorities, to disdain the Lithuanian attributes of our country. If you do not do this - we will!

The organization most likely disbanded after the Christian Democratic victory in the 1923 Seimas elections. Non-Lithuanian signs in Kaunas would be sporadically blackened until July 1924, when the local government ordered the removal of all non-Lithuanian signs within three months. After the deadline, the city administration appointed an "official painter" who blackened the unremoved signs.

== Organization and membership ==
Little is known about the organization's structure and member affiliation, however, known members belonged to a wide spectrum of right-wing organizations in Lithuania - including both right-wing parties, the Christian Democrats and the Party of National Progress (later the Lithuanian Nationalist Union), as well as the nationalist student corporation Neo-Lithuania and the Catholic youth organizations Ateitis and Pavasaris. The leader of the organization was Jonas Žilinskas, the first chief of the State Security Department of Lithuania from 1918 to 1919. Stasys Lozoraitis, later Foreign Minister of Lithuania, and composer Kazimieras Viktoras Banaitis may have participated in the organization or were affiliated.

It was most active in Kaunas, although smaller activist groups were formed elsewhere in the country from autumn of 1922 onwards.
