= Jonas Žilinskas =

Lithuanian military officer

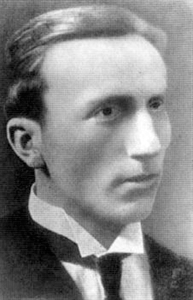
Portrait of Jonas Žilinskas

Jonas Žilinskas (1888–1956) was a military officer and the first head of the interwar Lithuanian intelligence service, the Unit of Intelligence (Žvalgybos skyrius), a predecessor of the State Security Department of Lithuania.

== Biography ==
=== Early life ===
Jonas Žilinskas was born in 1888 in the village of Smalininkai in Congress Poland. Žilinskas was a law student in the Saint Petersburg University and an officer in the Russian Imperial Army.

=== Intelligence officer ===
He became famous for organizing a small Lithuanian volunteer force around the area of Kalvarija. In 1918, then-Colonel Jurgis Kubilius received notice about Žilinskas. Žilinskas was called to Vilnius and ordered to "be a permanent, now paid official of the Supreme Military Council". The assignment date of Žilinskas, 27 October 1918, is considered the start of Lithuanian military intelligence activities. On 1 December 1918, Žilinskas officially joined the Lithuanian army. According to Žilinskas's memoirs, Liudas Gira, a local of Vilnius, advised Žilinskas on what individuals to trust in the new endeavor. Žilinskas and his team sent information to Prime Minister Augustinas Voldemaras. To cover the true nature of his work, Žilinskas was officially named a "special affairs officer". On 6 January 1919, the News Unit (Žinių dalis) was established in Kaunas. In the beginning, a total of four agents worked in the agency. On 12 May 1919, the News Unit was re-organized as the Unit of Intelligence. However, Žilinskas at that time was ill, and so had to be often substituted by Mikalojus Lipčius, who became Žilinskas's official successor on 12 July 1919.

=== Later life ===
After his service in military intelligence, Žilinskas was made the chief censor. He also served in the 7th Infantry Regiment. After being demobilized in 1922, Žilinskas worked at the Bank of Lithuania. In 1922, he headed the short-lived Union for the Defense of the Lithuanian Language. After the 1926 Lithuanian coup d'état, Žilinskas was made chief of the railway police. From 17 October 1929, he worked in Kaunas as a notary.

In 1944, Žilinskas moved to Germany, and later to the United States. Žilinskas died in 1956.
