= Mūsų žinynas =

Mūsų žinynas (transl. Our Manual) was a Lithuanian-language military journal published by the Lithuanian Ministry of Defence in Kaunas from 1921 to 1940. In total, 184 issues were published in the interwar Lithuania. The journal was revived in 2023 and is published by the General Jonas Žemaitis Military Academy of Lithuania.

== History ==
After the end of the Lithuanian Wars of Independence, the Ministry of Defence allocated resources to improve soldiers' education and promote military science. It was decided to establish a journal dedicated to military science and history. The first issue of Mūsų žinynas was published in March 1921. It was discontinued after the Soviet occupation of Lithuania in 1940.

Initially, the journal was every two months. In 1929, it became a monthly. In total, 184 issues (about 21,700 pages) were published in interwar Lithuania. Its circulation was 3,000 copies in 1921–1923, 1,000 copies in 1924–1932, 2,500 copies after 1933.

The journal was revived in July 2023 and is published twice a year by the General Jonas Žemaitis Military Academy of Lithuania.

== Content ==
The journal published articles on various topics, including military history (for example, a study on the Uprising of 1863 by Augustinas Janulaitis), military education, organization and management of military units, military technology and weapons, review of military publications. The journal also published articles on psychological (for example, article on fear by Jonas Vabalas-Gudaitis) or philosophical (for example, article on life and death by Sofija Kymantaitė-Čiurlionienė) topics.

In 1925, the journal ceased publishing articles on military history as a separate journal Karo archyvas was established devoted to military history. In 1937, Mūsų žinynas was reorganized and focused on military education and preparedness.

The journal published several supplements, including Kardas and Karo archyvas, which evolved into independent publications, as well as Karo literatūros rodyklė and Karo mokslų draugijos žinios.

== Editors and contributors ==
The journal was edited by:

- Jonas Laurinaitis (issues 1–2)
- Vytautas Steponaitis (issues 3–27 and 33–122)
- Juozas Lanskoronskis (issues 28–32)
- Aleksandras Šimkus (123–184)

Many prominent Lithuanians contributed articles to the journal, including Jonas Basanavičius, Petras Biržys, Martynas Yčas, Augustinas Janulaitis, Paulius Galaunė, Kazys Musteikis, Petras Ruseckas, Aleksandras Ružancovas, and others.
