= Petras Kirlys =

Lithuanian military officer (1891–1940)

Lieutenant Colonel Petras Kirlys
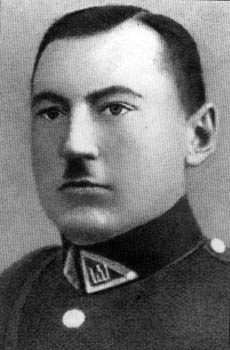
- Born: 9 July 1891; Bogušiškiai, Kovno Governorate, Russian Empire
- Died: 28 July 1940 (aged 49) Butyrka prison, Moscow, Soviet Union
- Allegiance: Russian Empire; Lithuania
- Service years: 1919–1940 (Lithuanian Army); 1923–1930 (Lithuanian intelligence services)
- Alma mater: Imperial Moscow University; Vytautas Magnus University
- Spouse: Nadiežda Kirlienė

Petras Kirlys (9 July 1891 – 28 July 1940) was a Lithuanian military officer and head of the Lithuanian intelligence services, periodically serving from 1923 to 1930.

== Biography ==
Petras Kirlys was born on 9 July 1891 in the village of Bogušiškiai (modern-day Kamajai area) in the Kovno Governorate of the Russian Empire to Juozapas Kirlys and Karolina Smalskytė. He studied at the Imperial Moscow University from 1913 to 1915. After being mobilized into the Russian Imperial Army's 45th Infantry Division's 178th Infantry Regiment in the wake of the First World War, Kirlys graduated from the Moscow War School.

After returning to Lithuania, on 21 July 1921 he was mobilized into the Lithuanian Army and appointed interrogator of the legal division of the intelligence department of the General Staff. On 3 September he was made Senior lieutenant. On 1 December 1921, he was made an official of the 12th reconnaissance unit, and unit assistant on 1 January 1922. On 1 May 1922, Kirlys was promoted to captain, and to mayor on 1 December 1923. After the reorganization of the intelligence department into civilian and military intelligence, Kirlys stayed in the civilian intelligence. Kirlys assisted the creation of criminal police.

On 23 January 1924, he was appointed officer correspondent to the Minister of National Defense. On 1 January 1926 he was appointed as a special affairs officer at the Ministry of National Defense. On 16 February 1928 he was promoted to lieutenant colonel. On 8 March 1929, Kirlys was transferred to the second information unit of the army's supreme board. In 1930, he graduated from Vytautas Magnus University with a law degree. On 1 October 1932, he was again made special affairs officer, and on 1 August 1935 was made the deputy of the head of intelligence and counter-intelligence.

After the Soviet Union occupied Lithuania, Kirlys was discharged from the army on 19 June 1940. He was arrested on 18 July and imprisoned in Kaunas. On 23 July, he was transferred to a Lefortovo prison in Moscow. On 28 July 1940, he was executed in the Butyrka prison.

Petras Kirlys married Nadiežda Kirlienė in 1922. Their descendants live in Australia.

== Awards ==
Kirlys received the following awards:

- Lithuanian Independence Medal (1928)
- Latvian War of Independence 10 Year Anniversary Commemorative Medal (1929)
- Order of Vytautas the Great, 4th degree (1930)
- Order of Vasa, 3rd degree (1933)
- Order of the Three Stars, 3rd degree (1935)
- Order of the Lithuanian Grand Duke Gediminas, 3rd degree (1939)
