= Saločiai =

- Town
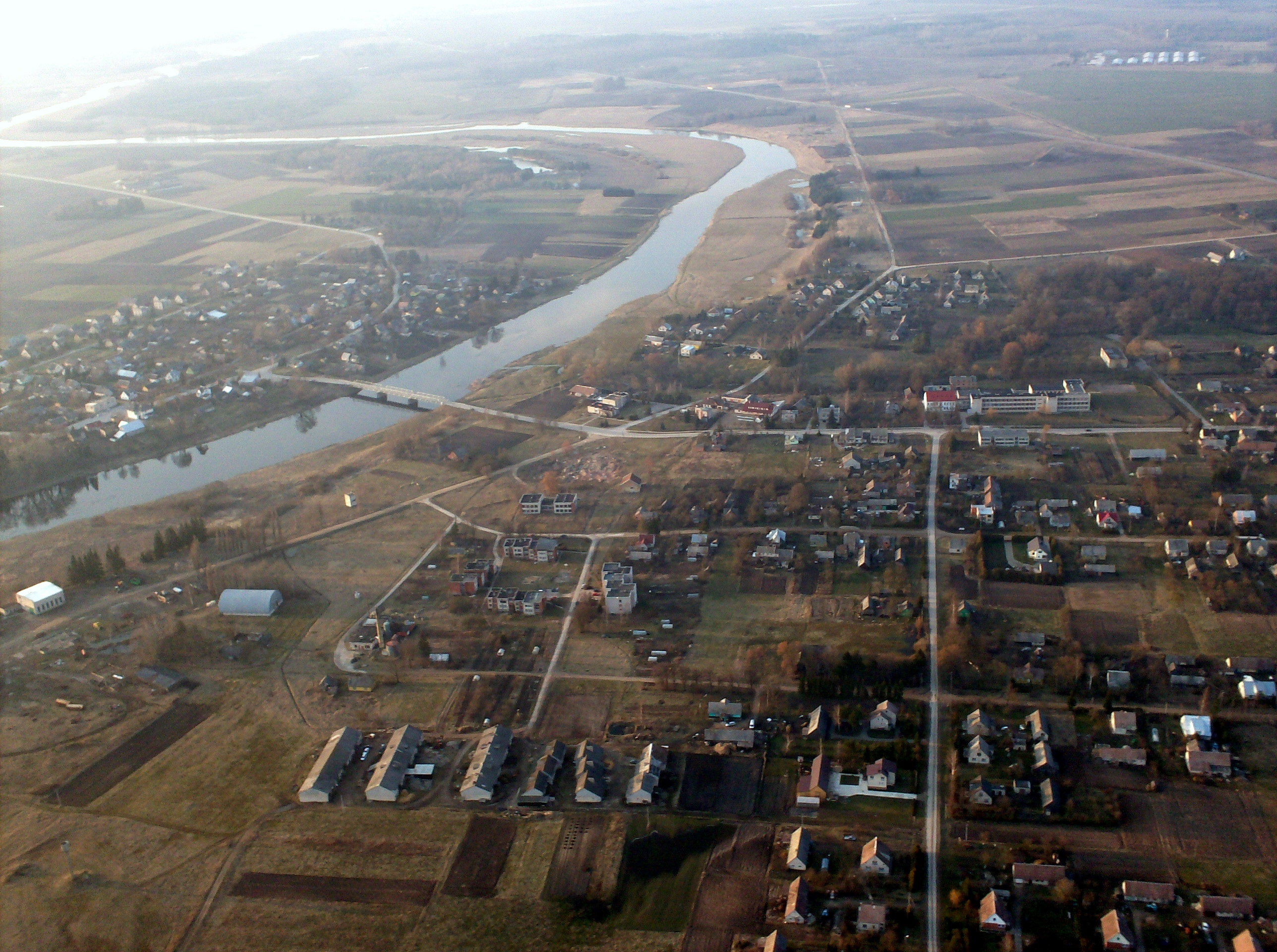

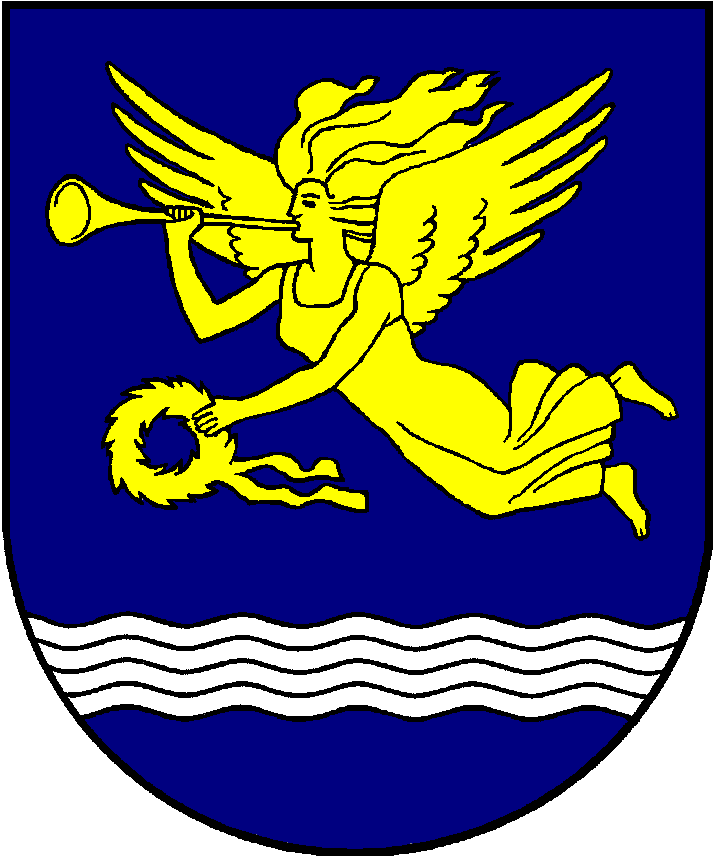
- Seal

- Location within Lithuania
- Coordinates: 56°13′40″N 24°25′0″E
- Country: Lithuania
- County: Panevėžys County

Population (2011)
  - Total: 720
- Time zone: UTC+2 (EET)
  - Summer (DST): UTC+3 (EEST)

Saločiai is a small town in Panevėžys County, in northeastern Lithuania next to the border with Latvia. According to the 2011 census, the town had a population of 720 people.

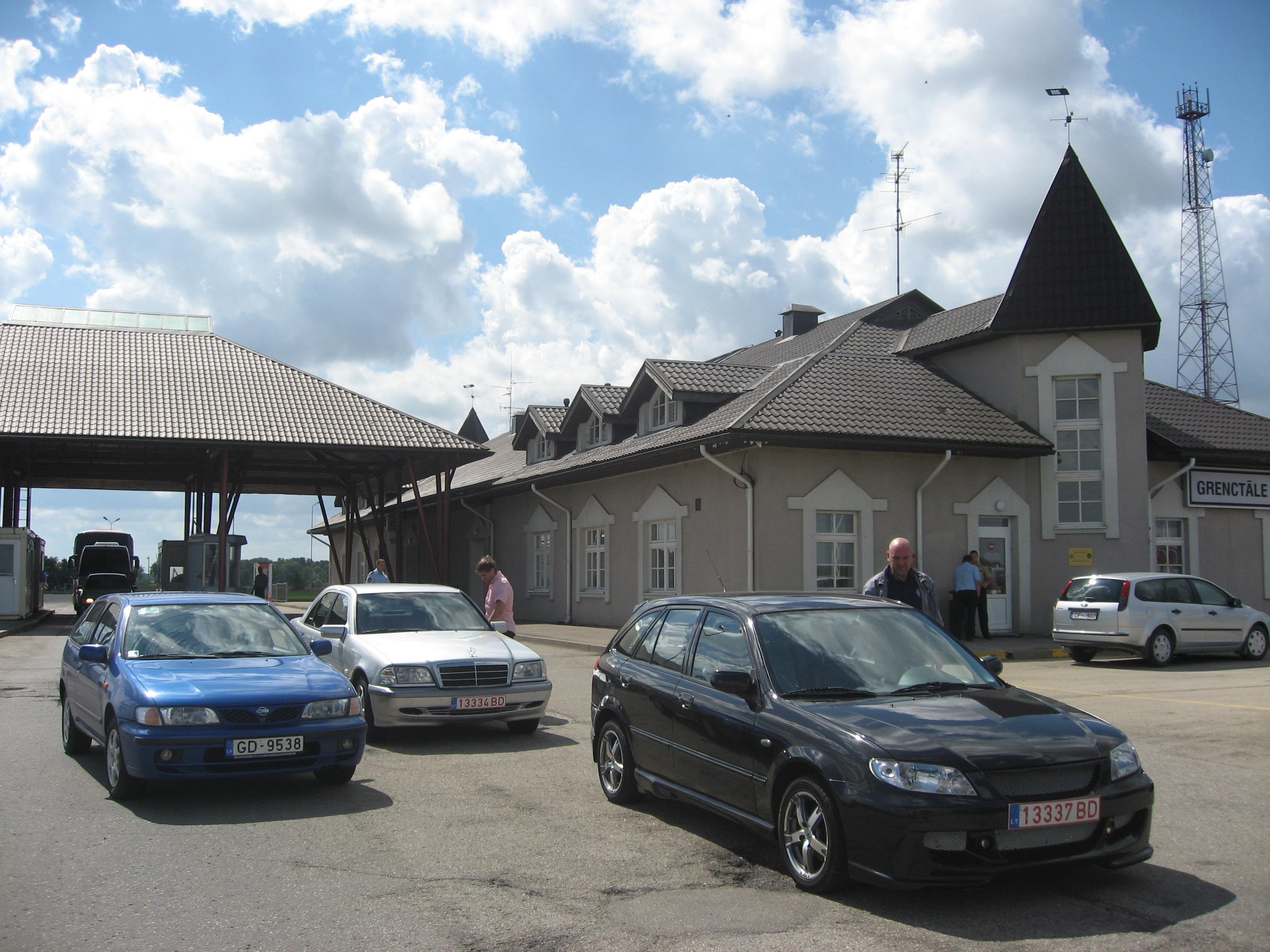
Border crossing point with Latvia.

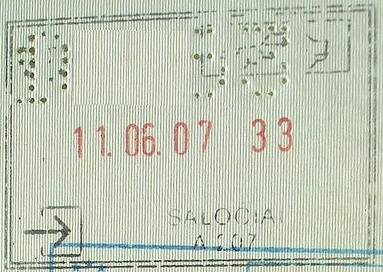
A pre-Schengen passport stamp issued at the border with Latvia.
