= Order of Vytautas the Great =

Lithuanian order of chivalry

Order of Vytautas the Great Vytauto Didžiojo ordinas
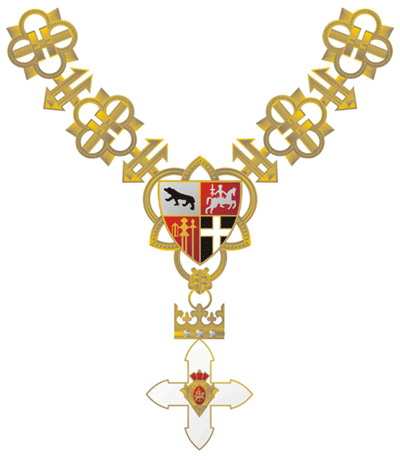
- Special Class of the Order of Vytautas the Great with Golden Chain

Awarded by the President of the Republic of Lithuania
- Type: State decoration
- Established: 27 October 1930
- Country: Lithuania
- Motto: VYTAUTAS DIDYSIS
- Awarded for: Distinguished services to the State of Lithuania
- Status: Active
- Classes: Order with a Golden Chain; Grand Cross; Commander's Grand Cross; Commander's Cross; Officer's Cross; Knight's Cross

Precedence
- Next (higher): none – highest award
- Next (lower): Order of the Cross of Vytis
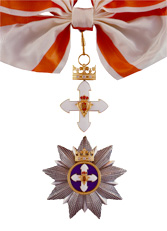
- Grand Cross and Star

The Order of Vytautas the Great (Lithuanian: Vytauto Didžiojo ordinas) is the Lithuanian Presidential Award. It may be conferred on the heads of Lithuania and foreign states, as well as their citizens, for distinguished services to the State of Lithuania.

== History ==
The Order was instituted in 1930 to commemorate the 500th anniversary of the death of the Lithuanian Grand Duke Vytautas the Great. The badge of the Order, struck in pre-war Lithuania, was designed by a Lithuanian artist, Jonas Burba. The insignia of the Order issued today are of the same design.

== Classes ==
The Order of Vytautas the Great has five classes:

1. Grand Cross
2. Commander's Grand Cross
3. Commander's Cross
4. Officer's Cross
5. Knight's Cross
Special class of this insignia - the Order of Vytautas the Great with the Golden Chain.

=== Grand Cross ===
The insignia of the Grand Cross consists of the Grand Cross, Star and sash. The Grand Cross is 50mm wide. It is made from gold and covered with white enamel. On the front, of the Cross, a rider is depicted against a background of a red shield. The same shield, with a V (to signify the name Vytautas) in the middle, is on the reverse of the Cross. Above the shield is the Grand Crown of the Duke. On the edges of the Cross are the dates of Vytautas the Great's rule (1392–1430). The reverse of the Cross features a golden Royal Crown embellished with three crystal stones.

The Star measures 85mm and is made from gold. It has nine sides. In the centre, a smaller version of the Vytautas the Great Cross with a golden Crown above is depicted on a background of blue enamel.

The Order's sash is made from white moiré and is 100mm wide for men, 65mm for women. It features two smaller orange strips on the sides.

The Swedish King Carl XVI Gustaf and Queen Silvia were the first foreigners to receive the Order in 1995, during the official visit of the President of Lithuania to Sweden.

=== Commander's Grand Cross ===
The Commander's Grand Cross insignia consists of the Grand Cross, Star and Ribbon. The Grand Cross has most of the same features as above. The Order's ribbon is made from white moiré with two orange stripes and is 40mm wide for men and women.

The Order's Star measures 85mm and has nine sides. It is made of gold. In the centre, there is a smaller version of the Vytautas the Great Cross with a golden Crown, on black enamel.

=== Commander's Cross ===
The Commander's Cross consists of a Cross and Ribbon. It is similar to the Grand Cross.

=== Officer's Cross ===
The Officer's Cross consists of a Cross and a small Ribbon. It is similar to the Grand Cross but smaller at 42mm. The Ribbon is 32mm wide and made from white moiré.

=== Knight's Cross ===
The Knight's Cross consists of a Cross and small Ribbon, similar to the Officer's Cross.

=== Order of Vytautas the Great with the Golden Chain ===
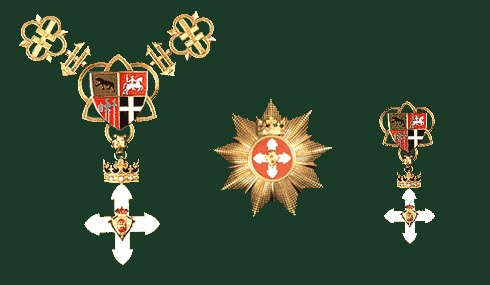
Set of Order with Golden Chain: Golden Chain and Order, Star, Cross (badge)

This special class of Order is the highest award of the State of Lithuania. It consists of a golden chain, cross, star and sash.

Parts of the Golden Chain form a double (six angle) cross, graced with a stylized V. Both edges of the Chain are linked by the central part, whose form and ornaments are taken from the seal of Vytautas the Great. The bear represents Smolensk, the horseman represents Vilnius, the warrior represents Trakai and the cross represents Volyn.

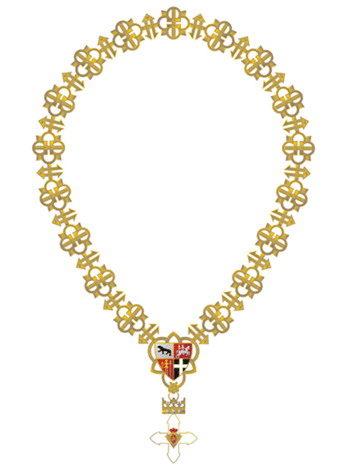
Full view of Order with Golden Chain

== Recipients of the Order of Vytautas the Great with the Golden Chain ==
- President of Lithuania, Valdas Adamkus, decorated on 26 February 2003
- President of Lithuania, Algirdas Brazauskas, decorated on 3 February 2003
- President of Lithuania, Rolandas Paksas, decorated on 25 February 2003
- Chairman of the Supreme Council of Lithuania, Vytautas Landsbergis, decorated on 3 February 2003
- President of Estonia, Arnold Rüütel, decorated on 30 September 2004
- President of Germany, Horst Köhler, decorated on 19 October 2005
- President of Poland, Aleksander Kwaśniewski, decorated on 2 November 2005
- President of Hungary, László Sólyom, decorated on 7 September 2006
- President of Ukraine, Viktor Yushchenko, decorated on 14 November 2006
- King of Spain, Juan Carlos I, decorated on 1 June 2005
- King of Belgium, Albert II, decorated on 16 March 2006
- Queen of 16 realms, Elizabeth II, decorated on 17 October 2006
- Emperor of Japan, Akihito, decorated on 22 May 2007
- President of Portugal, Aníbal Cavaco Silva, decorated on 29 May 2007
- President of Estonia, Toomas Hendrik Ilves, decorated on 25 April 2008
- Queen of Netherlands, Beatrix of the Netherlands, decorated on 24 June 2008
- President of Chile, Michelle Bachelet, decorated on 9 July 2008
- President of Austria, Heinz Fischer, decorated on 12 March 2009
- President of Bulgaria, Georgi Sedefchov Parvanov, decorated on 13 March 2009
- President of Lithuania, Dalia Grybauskaitė, decorated on 12 July 2009
- President of Latvia, Valdis Zatlers, decorated on 7 February 2011
- King of Norway, Harald V, decorated on 23 March 2011
- Former President of Poland, Lech Wałęsa rejected this award on 6 September 2011 as a result of alleged discrimination on the part of the Lithuanian government towards its Polish minority.
- President of Finland, Sauli Niinistö, decorated on 24 April 2013
- President of Germany, Joachim Gauck, decorated on 2 July 2013
- King of Sweden, Carl XVI Gustaf, decorated on 7 October 2015
- King of Netherlands, Willem Alexander, decorated on 13 June 2018
- President of Italy, Sergio Mattarella, decorated on 5 July 2018
- President of Poland, Andrzej Duda, decorated on 21 February 2019
- President of Lithuania, Gitanas Nausėda, decorated on 12 July 2019
- President of Ukraine, Volodymyr Zelenskyy, decorated on 11 March 2022
- President of Moldova, Maia Sandu, decorated on 6 July 2022
- King of Belgium, Philippe, decorated 24 October 2022
- President of the United States Joe Biden, decorated on 11 July 2023
- King of Denmark, Frederik X, decorated 28 January 2026
- President of Finland, Alexander Stubb, decorated on 14 May 2026
