= Occupation of the Baltic states =

Soviet and Nazi German occupation (1940–1991)

Occupation of the Baltic States
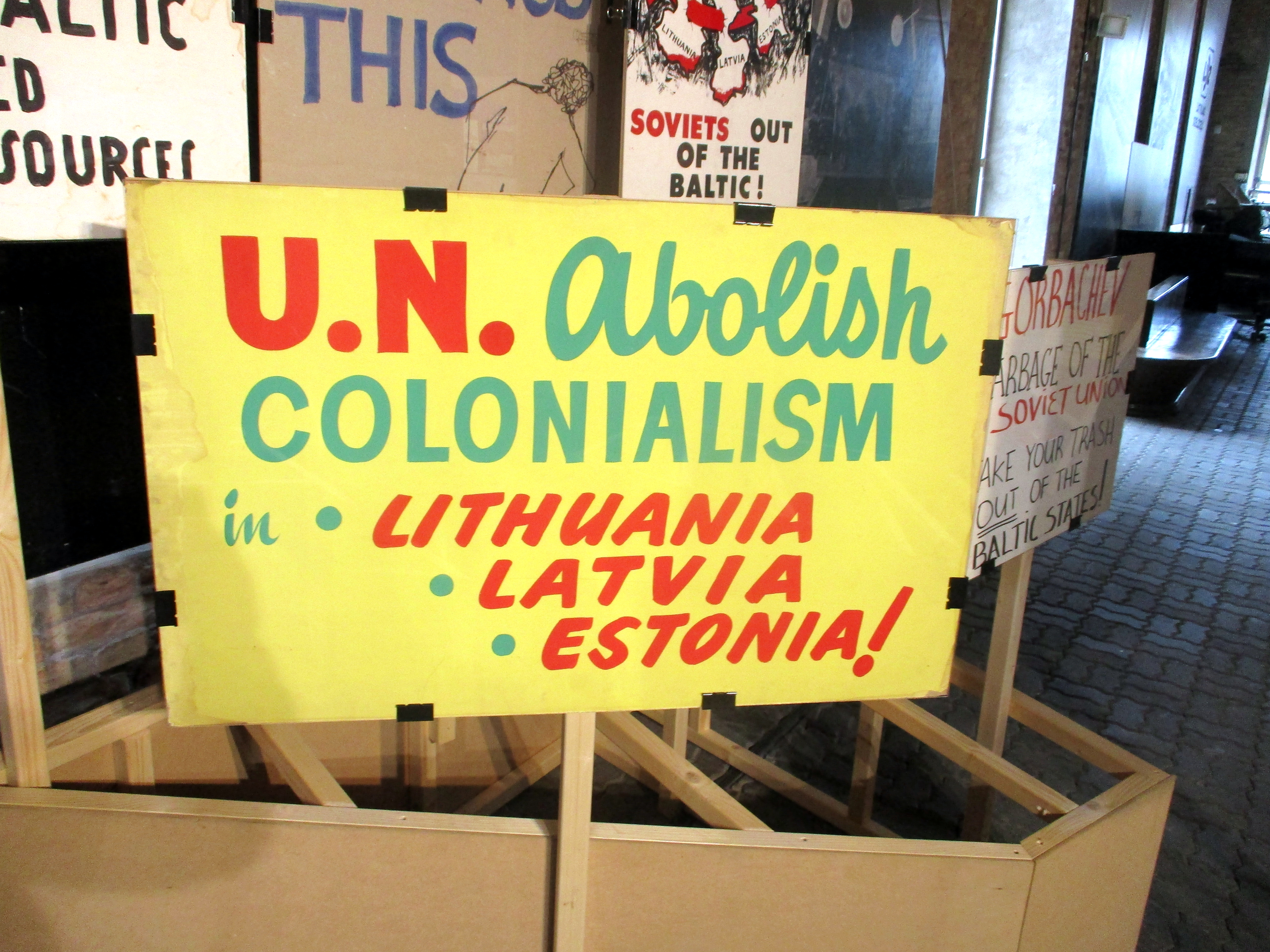
- A protest sign from the 1980s calling on the United Nations to abolish Soviet colonialism in the Baltic states
- Location: Baltic States
- Duration: 15 June 1940 – 6 September 1991 (51 years, 2 months, 3 weeks and 1 day) Military presence: 28 September 1939 – 31 August 1994 (54 years, 11 months and 3 days)
- Occupying power(s): Soviet Union (1940–1941, 1944–1990/1) Nazi Germany (1941–1944/5)
- Occupied state(s): Estonia; Latvia; Lithuania
- Administration: Estonian SSR; Latvian SSR; Lithuanian SSR; Reichskommissariat Ostland
- Annexed: 3–6 August 1940 Never
- War(s): World War II Cold War
- Outcome: Soviet occupation and annexation of Estonia, Latvia, and Lithuania (1940); German occupation and incorporation of the Baltic countries into the Reichskomissariat Ostland (1941); Soviet re-occupation (1944); Restoration of Baltic countries' independence during the Singing Revolution (1990–91)

The Baltic states—Estonia, Latvia, and Lithuania—were occupied and annexed by the Soviet Union in 1940 and remained under its control until its dissolution in 1991. For a period of several years during World War II, Nazi Germany occupied the Baltic states after it invaded the Soviet Union in 1941.

The initial Soviet invasion and occupation of the Baltic states began in June 1940 under the Molotov–Ribbentrop Pact, made between the Soviet Union and Nazi Germany in August 1939, before the outbreak of World War II. The three independent Baltic countries were annexed as constituent Republics of the Soviet Union in August 1940. Most Western countries did not recognise this annexation, and considered it illegal. In July 1941, the occupation of the Baltic states by Nazi Germany took place, just weeks after its invasion of the Soviet Union. The Third Reich incorporated them into its Reichskommissariat Ostland. In 1944, the Soviet Union recaptured most of the Baltic states as a result of the Red Army's Baltic Offensive, trapping the remaining German forces in the Courland Pocket until their formal surrender in May 1945.

During the 1944–1991 Soviet occupation, many people from Russia and other parts of the former USSR were settled in the three Baltic countries, while the local languages, religion, and customs were suppressed in an "extremely violent and traumatic" occupation. Colonization of the three Baltic countries included mass executions, deportations, and repression of the native population.

While there has been a broad international consensus that the Baltic states were illegally occupied and annexed, the Soviet Union never acknowledged that they were forcefully taken over. The post-Soviet government of Russia maintains the claim that the incorporations of Baltic states was in accordance with international law, and Russian school textbooks state that the Baltic states voluntarily joined the Soviet Union after grassroots popular socialist revolutions. As most Western governments maintained that Baltic sovereignty had not been legitimately overridden, they thus continued to recognise the Baltic states as sovereign political entities represented by the Baltic Legations, which functioned in Washington and elsewhere as governments in exile.

The Baltic states regained de facto independence in 1991 during the dissolution of the Soviet Union. Russia started to withdraw its troops from the Baltics starting with Lithuania in August 1993. However, it was a violent process and Soviet forces killed several Latvians and Lithuanians. The full withdrawal of troops deployed by Moscow ended in August 1994. Russia officially ended its military presence in the Baltics in August 1998 by decommissioning the Skrunda-1 radar station in Latvia. The dismantled installations were repatriated to Russia and the site returned to Latvian control, with the last Russian soldier leaving Baltic soil in October 1999.

== History ==
=== Background ===
Planned and actual divisions of Europe, according to the Molotov–Ribbentrop Pact, with later adjustments

Early in the morning of 24 August 1939, the Soviet Union and Germany signed a ten-year non-aggression pact, called the Molotov–Ribbentrop pact. The pact contained a secret protocol by which the states of Northern and Eastern Europe were divided into German and Soviet "spheres of influence". In the north, Finland, Estonia and Latvia were assigned to the Soviet sphere. Poland was to be partitioned in the event of its "political rearrangement"—the areas east of the Narev, Vistula, and San Rivers going to the Soviet Union while Germany would occupy the west. Lithuania, adjacent to East Prussia, would be in the German sphere of influence, although a second secret protocol agreed in September 1939 assigned the majority of Lithuanian territory to the Soviet Union. Under the secret protocol, Lithuania would regain its historical capital Vilnius, previously subjugated during the inter-war period by Poland.

Following the end of the Soviet invasion of Poland on 6 October, the Soviets pressured Finland and the Baltic states to conclude mutual assistance treaties. The Soviets questioned the neutrality of Estonia after the escape of an interned Polish submarine on 18 September. On 24 September, the Estonian foreign minister was given an ultimatum: the Soviets demanded a treaty of mutual assistance to establish military bases in Estonia. The Estonians were coerced to accept naval, air, and army bases on two Estonian islands and at the port of Paldiski. The corresponding agreement was signed on 28 September 1939. Latvia followed on 5 October 1939 and Lithuania shortly thereafter, on 10 October 1939. The agreements permitted the Soviet Union to establish military bases on the Baltic states' territory for the duration of the European war and to station 25,000 Soviet soldiers in Estonia, 30,000 in Latvia, and 20,000 in Lithuania starting October 1939.

=== Soviet occupation and annexation (1940–1941) ===
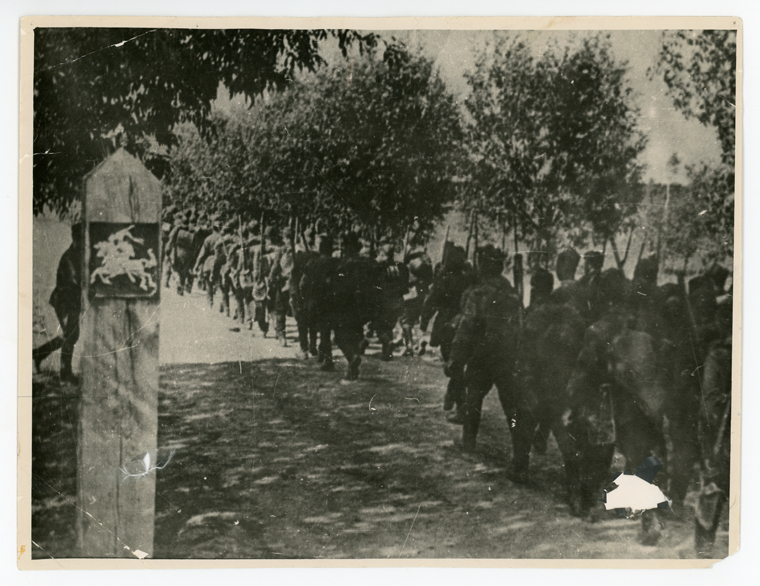
Soldiers of the Red Army enter the territory of Lithuania during the first Soviet occupation of Lithuania in 1940.

In May 1940, the Soviets turned to the idea of direct military intervention, but still intended to rule through puppet regimes. Their model was the Finnish Democratic Republic, a puppet regime set up by the Soviets on the first day of the Winter War. The Soviets organised a press campaign against the allegedly pro-Allied sympathies of the Baltic governments. In May 1940, the Germans invaded France, which was overrun and occupied a month later. In late May and early June 1940, the Baltic states were accused of military collaboration against the Soviet Union by holding meetings the previous winter. On 15 June 1940, the Lithuanian government was coerced into agreeing to the Soviet ultimatum and permitting the entry of an unspecified number of Soviet troops. President Antanas Smetona proposed armed resistance to the Soviets but the government refused, proposing their own candidate to lead the regime. However, the Soviets refused this proposal and sent Vladimir Dekanozov to take charge while the Red Army occupied the state.

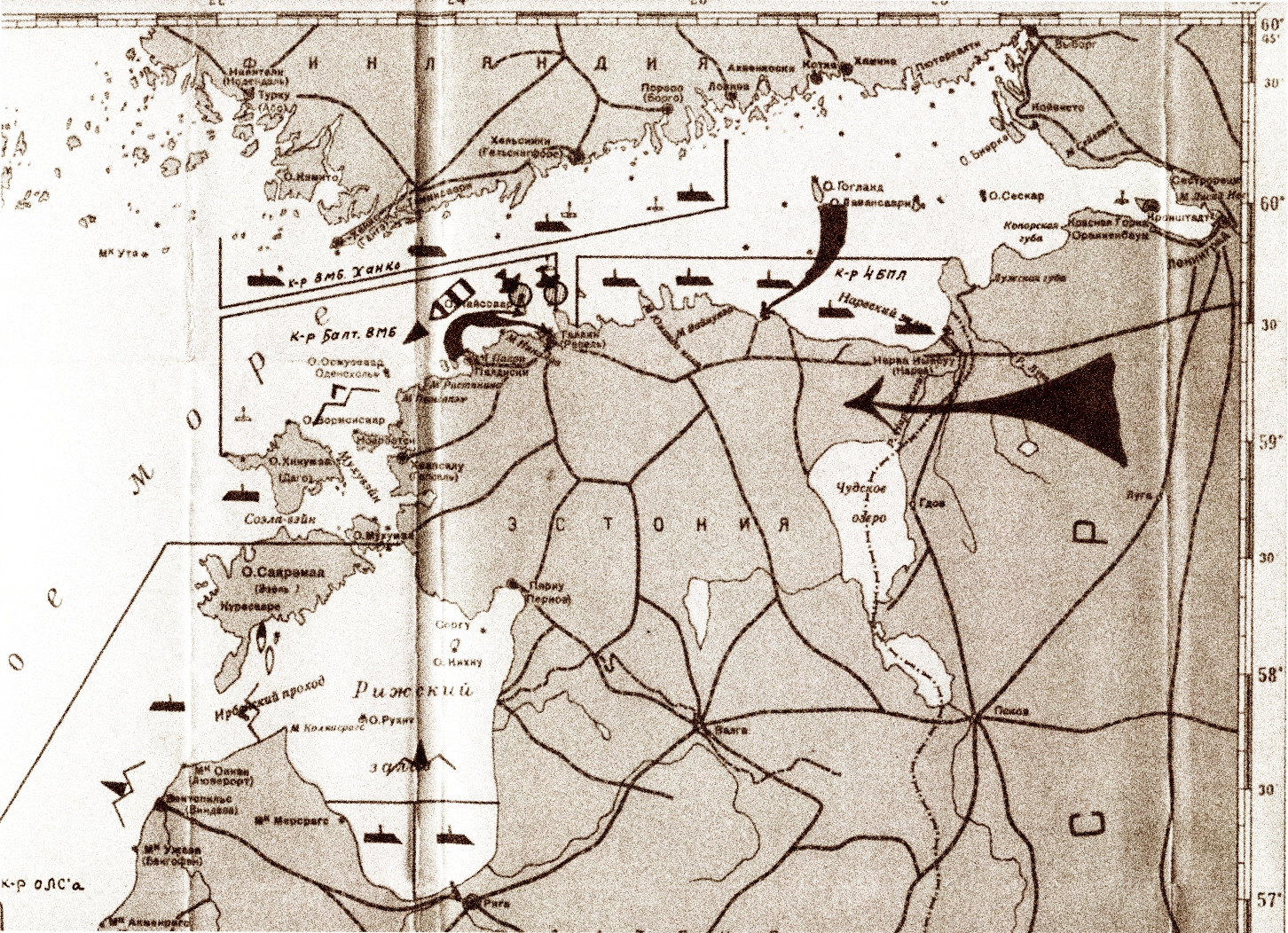
Schematics of the Soviet military blockade and invasion of Estonia in 1940 (Russian State Naval Archives)

On 16 June 1940, Latvia and Estonia also received ultimata. The Red Army occupied the two remaining Baltic states shortly thereafter. The Soviets dispatched Andrey Vyshinsky to oversee the takeover of Latvia and Andrey Zhdanov to Estonia. On 18 and 21 June 1940, new "popular front" governments were formed in each Baltic country, made up of Communists and fellow travelers. Under Soviet surveillance, the new governments arranged rigged elections for new "people's assemblies." Voters were presented with a single list, and no opposition movements were allowed to file candidates. To get the required turnout to 99.6%, votes were forged. A month later, when the new assemblies met, the sole item of business for each of them was a resolution to join the Soviet Union. In each case, the resolution passed by acclamation. The Supreme Soviet of the Soviet Union duly accepted the requests in August, thus sanctioning them under Soviet law. Lithuania was incorporated into the Soviet Union on 3 August, Latvia on 5 August, and Estonia on 6 August 1940. The deposed presidents of Estonia and Latvia, Konstantin Päts and Kārlis Ulmanis, were deported to the USSR and imprisoned. They died later in the Tver region and Central Asia respectively. In June 1941, the new Soviet governments carried out mass deportations of "enemies of the people". Estonia alone lost an estimated 60,000 citizens. Consequently, many Balts initially greeted the Germans as liberators when they invaded a week later.

The Soviet Union immediately started to erect border fortifications along its newly acquired western border—the so-called Molotov Line.

=== German occupation (1941–1945) ===
==== Ostland province and the Holocaust ====
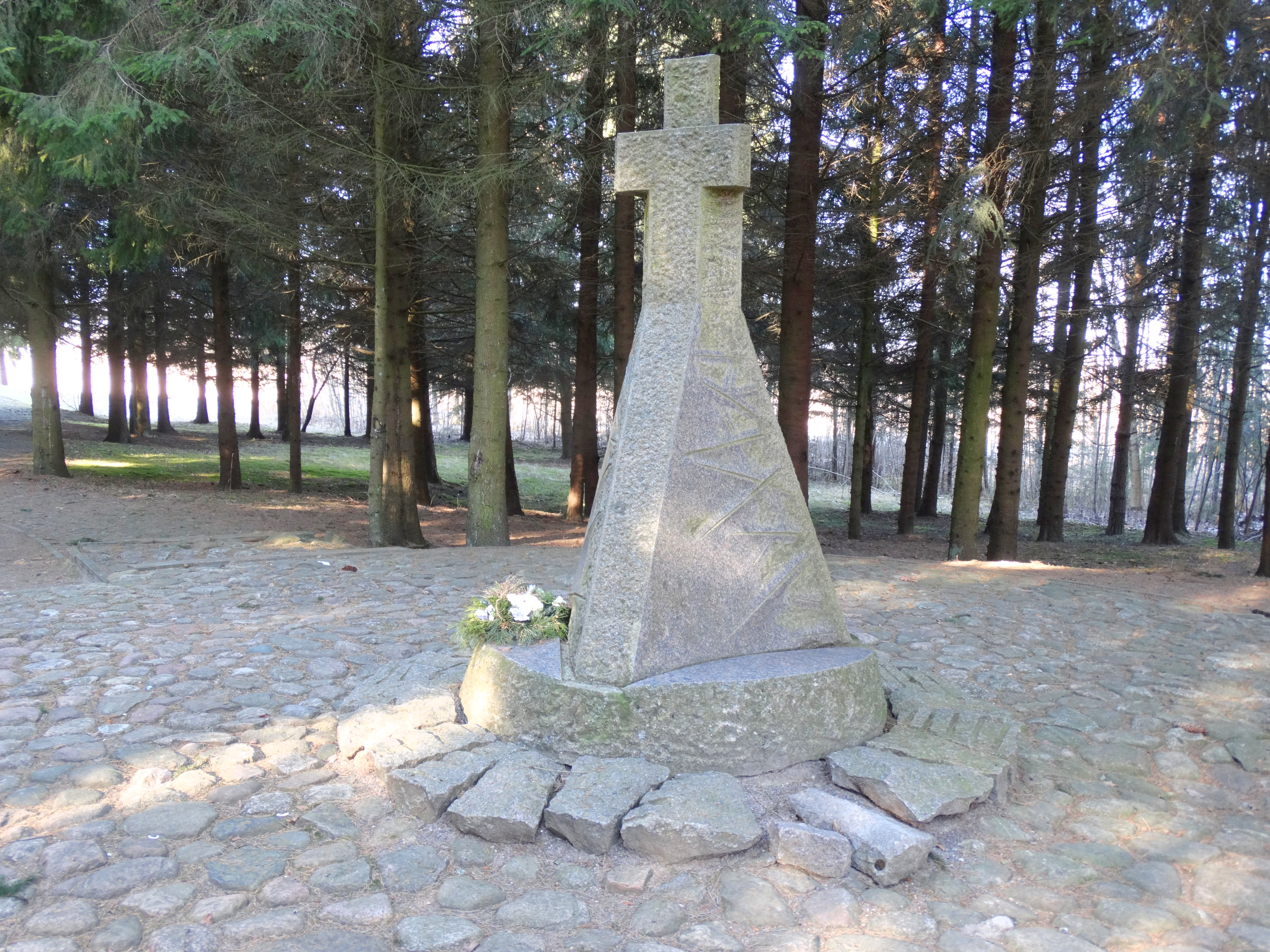
A cross commemorating the victims of the Rainiai massacre, committed by the Soviet NKVD on 24–25 June 1941

On 22 June 1941, the Germans invaded the Soviet Union. The Baltic states, recently Sovietized by threats, force, and fraud, generally welcomed the German armed forces. In Lithuania, a revolt broke out and an independent provisional government was established. As the German armies approached Riga and Tallinn, attempts to reestablish national governments were made. Baltic citizens hoped that the Germans would reestablish Baltic independence. Such hopes soon evaporated and Baltic cooperation became less forthright or ceased altogether. The Germans aimed to annex the Baltic territories into the Third Reich, where "suitable elements" would be assimilated and "unsuitable elements" exterminated. In practice, the implementation of occupation policy was more complex; for administrative convenience, the Baltic states were included with Belorussia in the Reichskommissariat Ostland. The area was governed by Hinrich Lohse, who was obsessed with bureaucratic regulations. The Baltic area was the only eastern region intended to become a full province of the Third Reich.

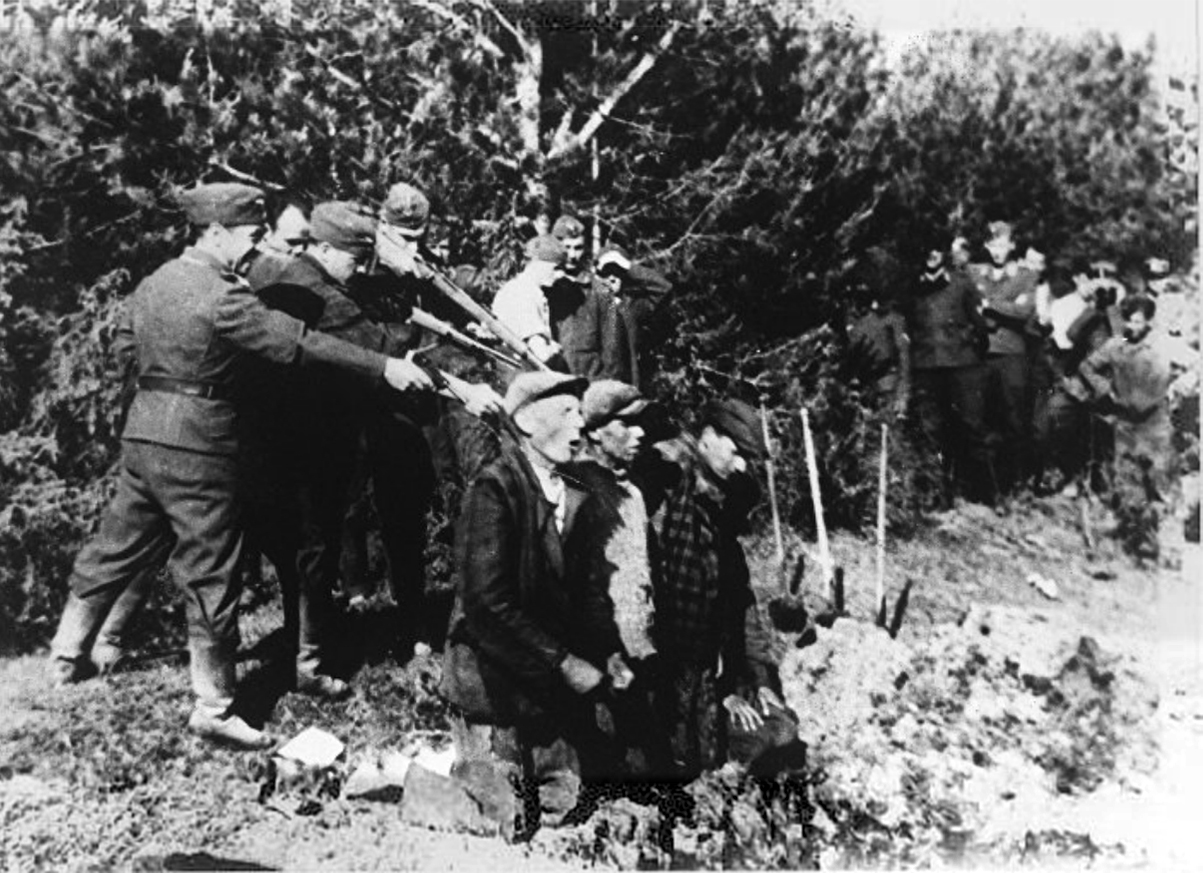
Einsatzkommando execution in Lithuania

Nazi racial attitudes to the peoples of the three Baltic countries differed between Nazi authorities. In practice, racial policies were directed not against the majority of Balts but rather against the Jews. Large numbers of Jews were living in the major cities, notably in Vilnius, Kaunas, and Riga. The German mobile killing units slaughtered hundreds of thousands of Jews; Einsatzgruppe A, assigned to the Baltic area, was the most effective of four units. German policy forced the Jews into ghettos. In 1943, Heinrich Himmler ordered his forces to liquidate the ghettos and to transfer the survivors to concentration camps. Some Latvians and Lithuanian conscripts collaborated actively in the killing of Jews, and the Nazis managed to provoke pogroms locally, especially in Lithuania. Only about 75 percent of Estonian and 10 percent of Latvian and Lithuanian Jews survived the war. However, for the majority of Lithuanians, Latvians and Estonians, the German rule was less harsh than Soviet rule had been, and it was less brutal than German occupations elsewhere in eastern Europe. Local puppet regimes performed administrative tasks and schools were permitted to function. However, most people were denied the right to own land or businesses.

==== Baltic nationals within the Soviet forces ====
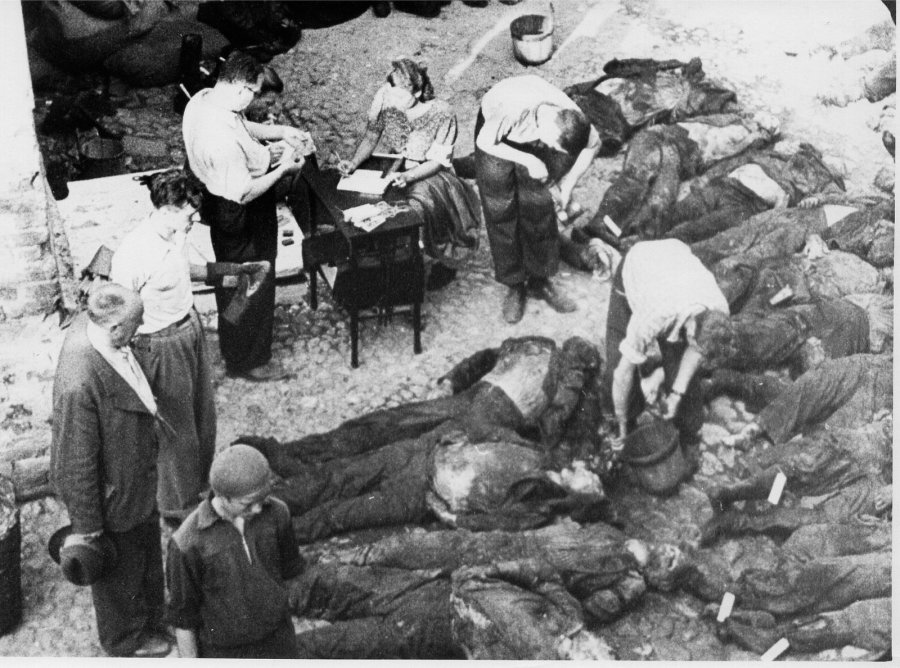
Victims of Soviet NKVD in Tartu, Estonia (1941)

The Soviet administration had forcibly incorporated the Baltic national armies at the wake of the occupation in 1940. Most of the senior officers were arrested and many of them murdered. During the German invasion, the Soviets conducted a forced general mobilisation that took place in violation of the international law. Under the Geneva Conventions, this act of violence is seen as a grave breach and war crime, because the mobilised men were treated as arrestants from the very beginning. In comparison with the general mobilisation proclaimed in the Soviet Union, the age range was extended by 9 years in the Baltics; all reserve officers were also taken. The aim was to deport all men capable to fight to Russia, where they were sent to convict camps. Almost half of them perished because of the transportation conditions, slave labour, hunger, diseases, and the repressive measures of the NKVD. In addition, destruction battalions were formed under the command of the NKVD. Hence, Baltic nationals fought in both German and Soviet army ranks. There was the 201st Latvian Rifle Division. The 308th Latvian Rifle Division was awarded the Red Banner Order after the expulsion of the Germans from Riga in the autumn of 1944.

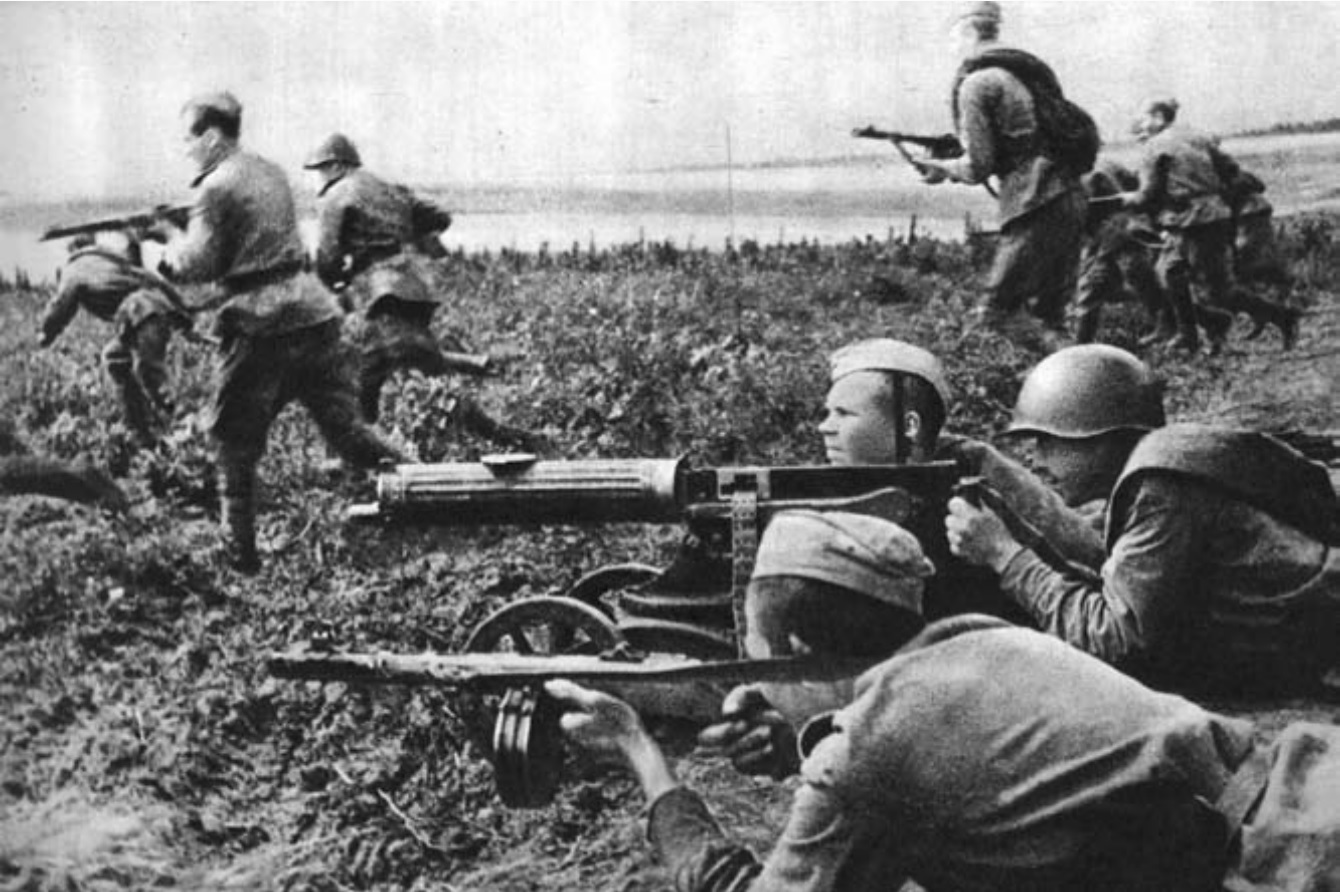
The Red Army's 16th Rifle Division fighting in the Oryol Oblast in the summer of 1943

An estimated 60,000 Lithuanians were drafted into the Red Army. During 1940, on the basis of the disbanded Lithuanian Army, the Soviet authorities organized the 29th Territorial Rifle Corps. The decrease in quality of life and service conditions, and forceful indoctrination of Communist ideology, caused discontent amongst recently Sovietized military units. Soviet authorities responded with repressions against Lithuanian officers of the 29th Corps, arresting over 100 officers and soldiers and subsequently executing around 20 in Autumn 1940. By that time, allegedly nearly 3,200 officers and soldiers of the 29th Corps were considered "politically unreliable". Due to high tensions and soldiers' discontent, the 26th Cavalry Regiment was disbanded. During the 1941 June deportations, over 320 officers and soldiers of the 29th Corps were arrested and deported to concentration camps or executed. The 29th Corps collapsed with the German invasion into Soviet Union; on June 25–26, a rebellion broke in its 184th Rifle Division. The other division of the 29th Corps, the 179th Rifle Division, lost most of its soldiers during the retreat from Germans, mostly to deserting of its soldiers. A total of less than 1,500 soldiers from the initial strength of around 12,000 reached the area of Pskov by August 1941. By the second part of 1942, most of the Lithuanians remaining in the Soviet ranks, as well as male war refugees from Lithuania, were organized into the 16th Rifle Division during its second formation. 16th Rifle Division, despite officially called "Lithuanian" and mostly commanded by officers of Lithuanian origin, including Adolfas Urbšas, was ethnically very mixed, with up to 1/4 of its personnel made of Jews and thus being the largest Jewish formation of Soviet Army. A popular joke of those years said that the 16th Division was called Lithuanian, because there were 16 Lithuanians among its ranks.

The 7000-strong 22nd Estonian Territorial Rifle Corps got heavily beaten in the battles around Porkhov during the German invasion in summer 1941, as 2000 were killed or wounded in action, and 4500 surrendered. The 25,000–30,000 strong 8th Estonian Rifle Corps lost 3/4 of its troops in the Battle of Velikiye Luki in winter 1942/43. It participated in the capture of Tallinn in September 1944. About 20,000 Lithuanians, 25,000 Estonians, and 5000 Latvians died in the ranks of the Red Army and labor battalions.

==== Baltic nationals in the German forces ====
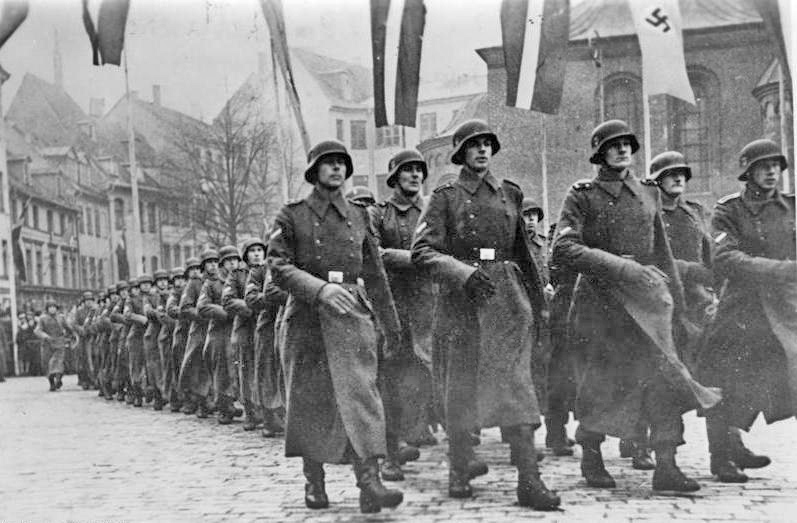
Latvian SS-Legion parade through Riga before deploying to the Eastern Front. December 1943.

The Nazi administration also conscripted Baltic nationals into the German armies. The Lithuanian Territorial Defense Force, composed of volunteers, was formed in 1944. The LTDF reached a size of roughly 10,000 men. Its goal was to fight the approaching Red Army, provide security, and conduct anti-partisan operations within the territory claimed by Lithuanians. After brief engagements against Soviet and Polish partisans, the force self-disbanded. Its leaders were arrested and sent to Nazi concentration camps, and many of members were executed by the Nazis. The Latvian Legion, created in 1943, consisted of two conscripted divisions of the Waffen-SS. On 1 July 1944, the Latvian Legion had 87,550 men. Another 23,000 Latvians were serving as Wehrmacht "auxiliaries". Among other battles, they participated in the Siege of Leningrad, in the Courland Pocket fighting, the defence of the Pomeranian Wall, at the Velikaya River for Hill "93,4", and in the defence of Berlin. The 20th Waffen Grenadier Division of the SS (1st Estonian) was formed in January 1944 through conscription. Consisting of 38,000 men, it took part in the Battle of Narva, the Battle of Tannenberg Line, the Battle of Tartu, and Operation Aster.

==== Attempts to restore independence and the Soviet offensive of 1944 ====
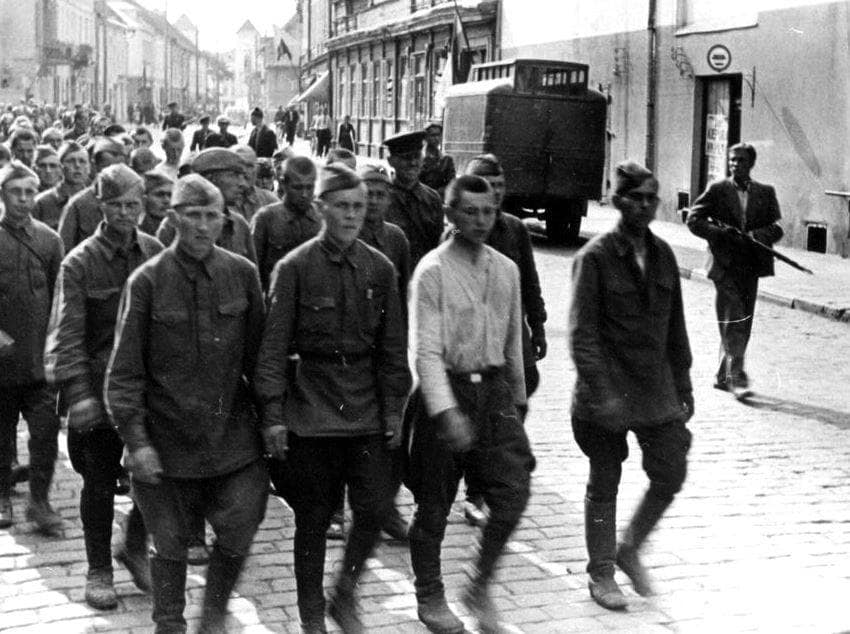
Lithuanian rebels lead the disarmed soldiers of the Red Army in Kaunas.

There were several attempts to restore independence during the occupation. On 22 June 1941, the Lithuanians overthrew Soviet rule two days before the Wehrmacht arrived in Kaunas, where the Germans then allowed a Provisional Government to function for over a month. The Latvian Central Council was set up as an underground organisation in 1943, but it was destroyed by the Gestapo in 1945. In Estonia in 1941, Jüri Uluots proposed restoration of independence; later, by 1944, he had become a key figure in the secret National Committee. In September 1944, Uluots briefly became acting president of independent Estonia. Unlike the French and the Poles, the Baltic states had no governments in exile located in the West. Consequently, Great Britain and the United States lacked any interest in the Baltic cause while the war against Germany remained undecided. The discovery of the Katyn massacre in 1943 and callous conduct towards the Warsaw Uprising in 1944 had cast shadows on relations; nevertheless, all three victors still displayed solidarity at the Yalta Conference in 1945.

By 1 March 1944, the siege of Leningrad was over and Soviet troops were on the border with Estonia. The Soviets launched the Baltic Offensive, a twofold military-political operation to rout German forces, on 14 September. On 16 September, the High Command of the German Army issued a plan in which Estonian forces would cover the German withdrawal. The Soviets soon reached the Estonian capital Tallinn, where the NKVD's first mission was to stop anyone escaping from the state; however, many refugees did manage to escape to the West. The NKVD also targeted the members of the National Committee of the Republic of Estonia. German and Latvian forces remained trapped in the Courland Pocket until the end of the war, capitulating on 10 May 1945.

=== Second Soviet occupation (1944–1991) ===
==== Resistance and deportations ====
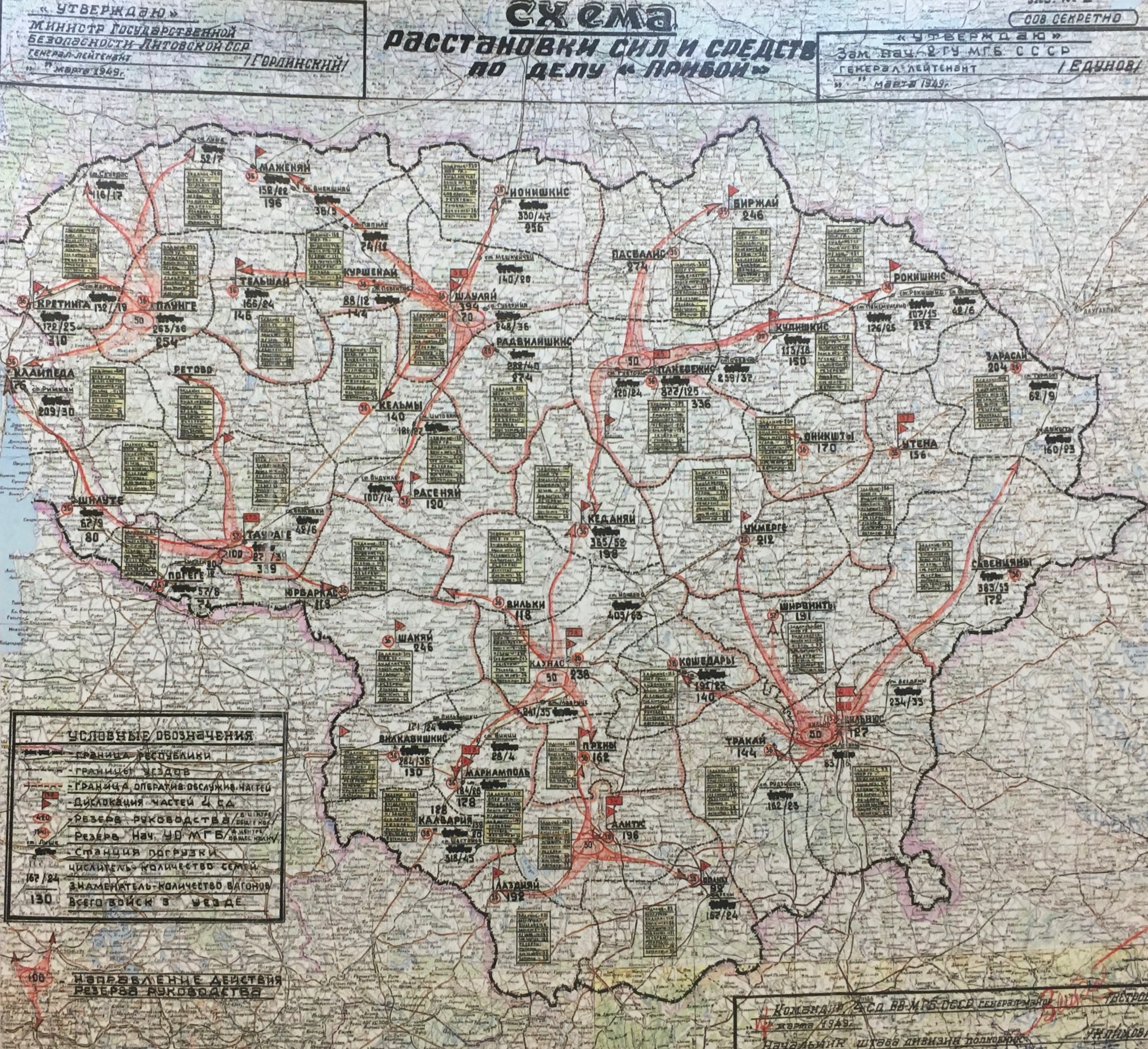
The plan of deportations of the civilian population in Lithuania during the Operation Priboi created by the Soviet MGB

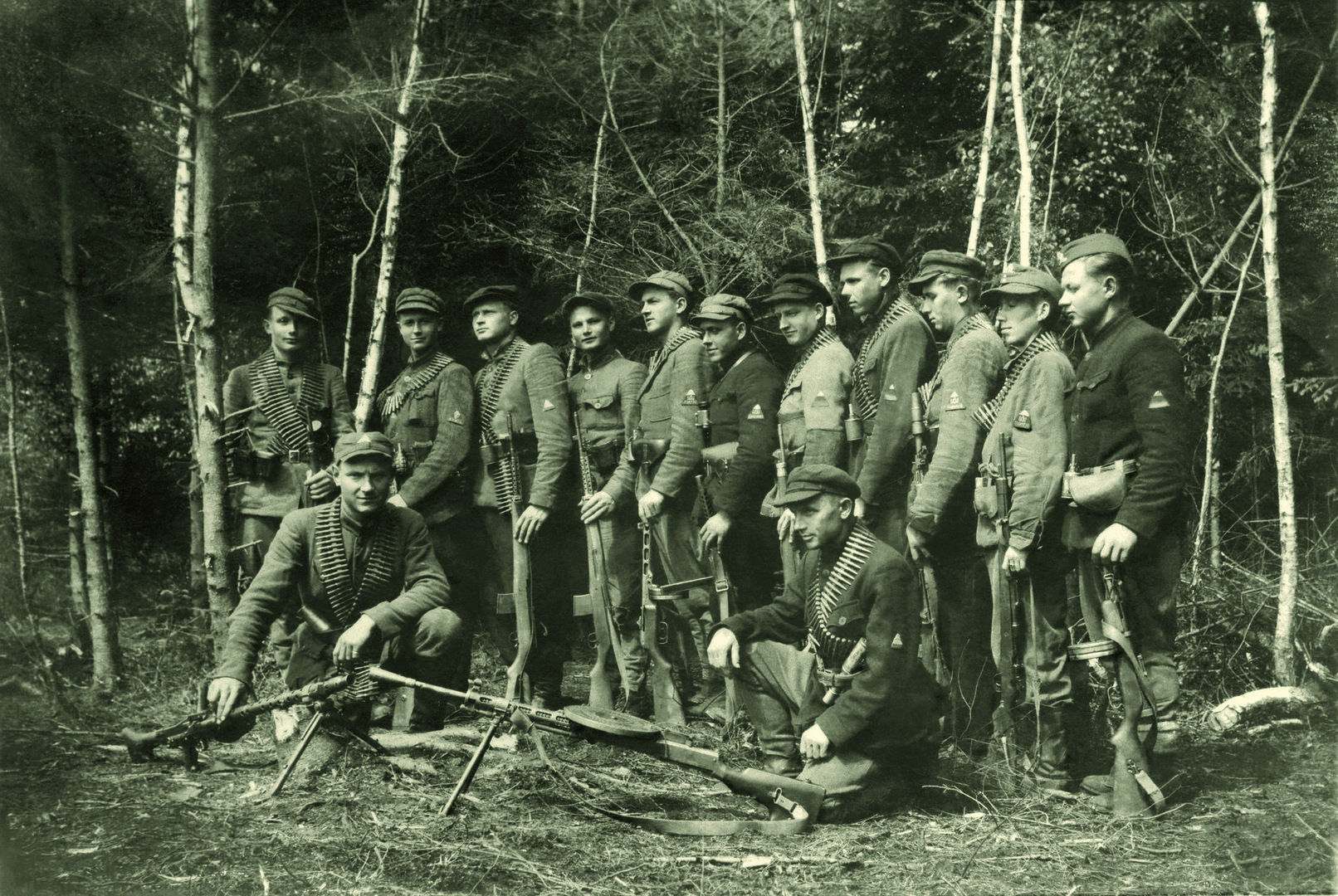
Lithuanian resistance fighters from the Tauras military district in 1945

After reoccupying the Baltic states, the Soviets implemented a program of sovietization, which was achieved through large-scale industrialisation rather than by overt attacks on culture, religion, or freedom of expression. The Soviets carried out massive deportations to eliminate any resistance to collectivisation or support of partisans. Baltic partisans, such as the Forest Brothers, continued to resist Soviet rule through armed struggle for a number of years.

The Soviets had previously carried out mass deportations in 1940–41, but the deportations between 1944 and 1952 were even greater. In March 1949 alone, the top Soviet authorities organised a mass deportation of 90,000 Baltic nationals. One estimate for the number of Lithuanians deported from 1945-1946 was 100,000. About 60,000 were estimated to have been deported from Latvia from 1945-1946.

The total number deported in 1944–55 has been estimated at over half a million: 124,000 in Estonia, 136,000 in Latvia and 245,000 in Lithuania.

The estimated death toll among Lithuanian deportees between 1945 and 1958 was 20,000, including 5,000 children.

The deportees were allowed to return after Nikita Khrushchev's secret speech in 1956 denouncing the excesses of Stalinism; however, many did not survive their years of exile in Siberia. After the war, the Soviets outlined new borders for the Baltic republics. Lithuania gained the regions of Vilnius and Klaipėda, while the Russian SFSR annexed territory from the eastern parts of Estonia (5% of prewar territory) and Latvia (2%).

==== Industrialization and immigration ====
The Soviets made investments to integrate the Baltic economies into the larger Soviet economic sphere to extract energy resources and the manufacture of industrial and agricultural products. In all three republics, manufacturing industry was developed, resulting in some of the best industrial complexes in the sphere of electronics and textile production. The rural economy suffered from the lack of investments and the collectivization. Baltic urban areas had been damaged during wartime and it took ten years to recuperate housing losses. New constructions were often of poor quality and ethnic Russian immigrants were favored in housing. Estonia and Latvia received large-scale immigration of industrial workers from other parts of the Soviet Union that changed the demographics dramatically. Lithuania also received immigration but on a smaller scale. Industrialization offered a path to moving large numbers of Russian settlers among local populations.

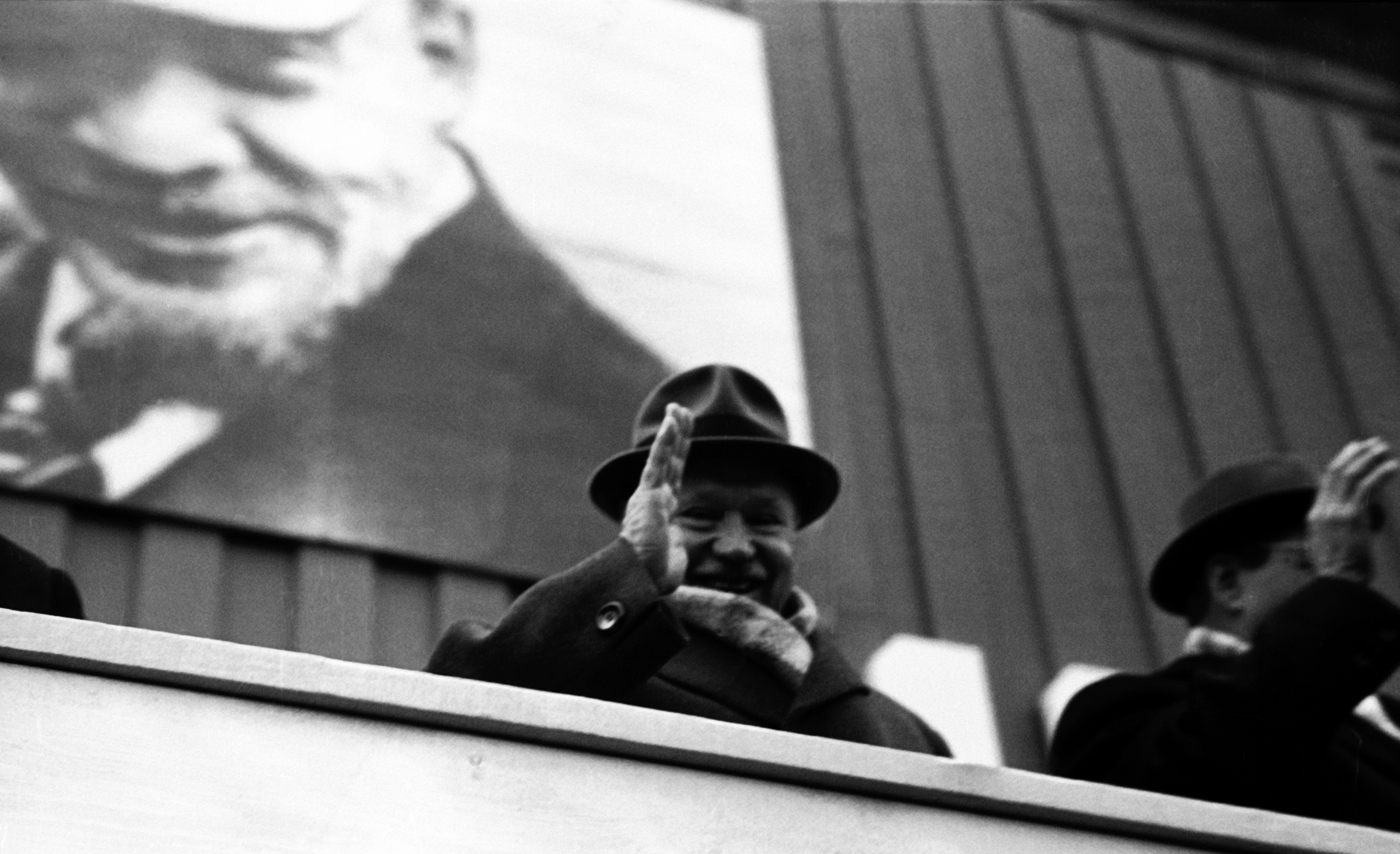
Antanas Sniečkus, the leader of the Communist Party of Lithuania from 1940 to 1974

Ethnic Estonians constituted 88 percent of the population before the war, but in 1970, the figure dropped to 60 percent. Ethnic Latvians constituted 75 percent, but the figure dropped 57 percent in 1970, and further down to 50.7 percent in 1989. In contrast, the drop in Lithuania was only 4 percent. Baltic communists had supported and participated the 1917 October Revolution in Russia. However, many of them were killed during the Great Purge in the 1930s. The new regimes of 1944 were established with native communists who had fought in the Red Army, but most positions were filled with imported Russian settlers to fill political, administrative, and managerial posts. For example, the important post of second secretary of local Communist party was almost always ethnic Russian or a member of another Slavic nationality. Party membership continued to be heavily Russian long into the postwar period. During the last quarter of 1944, the Estonian Communist Party had only 56 members, and recruitment in 1945 totaled a few hundred.

The new Lithuanian Communist Party was only 38% Lithuanian in 1953. The Latvian Communist Party was 52% Latvian in 1949. Estonians made up 42% of Estonia's Communist Party in 1946.

Thousands of non-indigenous administrators were imported at all levels in Lithuania, Russian settlers in particular. Even the native Lithuanian population included a group that lived in Russia, 13% of the ministers of Russian Lithuanians out of a total indigenous percentage of 32% in 1947.

In March 1949, of the 30 non-staff lecturers in the Agitprop Department of the City of Riga, only 8 knew Latvian, and these people were tasked with spreading Soviet ideology among the native population. Home-grown Communists in all three countries represented about one-third of the total membership around 1949. Despite the career opportunities involved in the occupation regimes, only 0.3% of the Lithuanians and 0.7% of the Latvians and Estonians had joined the Communist Parties after five years of continuous Russian occupation, reflecting the unpopularity of the occupation. This rate was 5 to 10 times less than the Soviet Union's average for Soviet Republics at the time.

The Baltic States were net contributors rather than beneficiaries during the illegal occupation. Detailed archival records of budget revenues and expenditures demonstrate that significantly more money was extracted from these territories than was ever invested back, even including large Soviet expenditures on its military and other repressive structures created to oppress the native population. The myth of generous Soviet "aid" in industrializing and developing the Baltics is false propaganda that conceals the substantial revenues and profits that were siphoned off by the occupying Soviets.

In Latvia's case specifically, archival evidence proves that from 1946 to 1990, the USSR drew far more resources from Latvian territory than it spent on it, with over 18% of revenues net-transferred out of the republic. The same pattern holds true for Estonia and Lithuania. This economic exploitation and heavy militarization explain why the Baltic nations, which had been relatively advanced before the war, became economically stunted compared to Western Europe, underlining the extractive nature of the Soviet occupation.

==== Restorations of independence ====
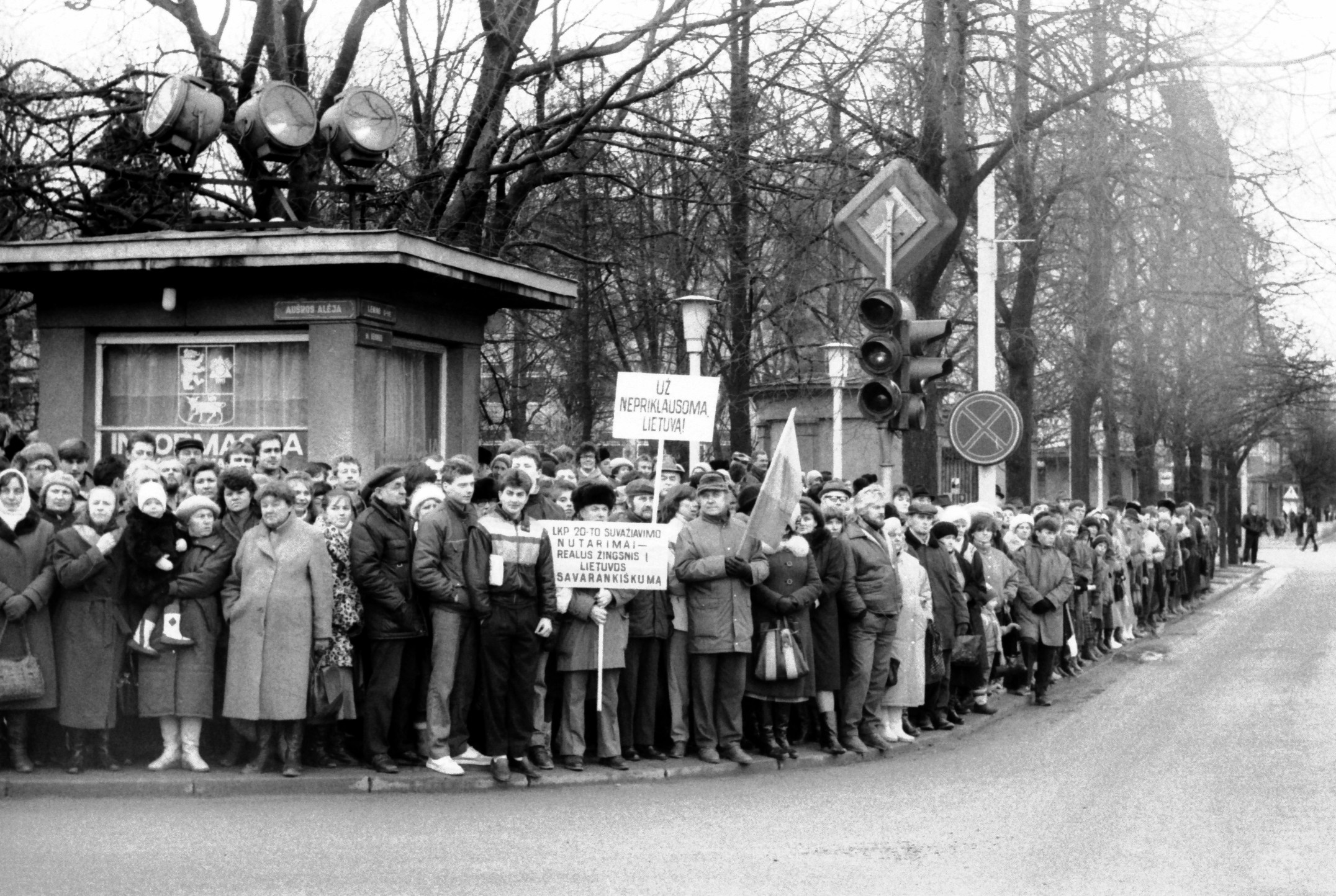
Pro-independence Lithuanians demonstrating in Šiauliai, January 1990

The period of stagnation brought the crisis of the Soviet system. The new Soviet leader Mikhail Gorbachev came to power in 1985 and responded with glasnost and perestroika. They were attempts to reform the Soviet system from above to avoid revolution from below. The reforms occasioned the reawakening of nationalism in the Baltic republics. The first major demonstrations against the environment were in Riga in November 1986 and the following spring in Tallinn. Small successful protests encouraged key individuals and by the end of 1988, the reform wing had gained the decisive positions in the Baltic republics. At the same time, coalitions of reformists and populist forces assembled under the Popular Fronts. The Supreme Soviet of the Estonian Soviet Socialist Republic made the Estonian language the state language again in January 1989, and similar legislation was passed in Latvia and Lithuania soon after. The Baltic republics declared their aim for sovereignty: Estonia in November 1988, Lithuania in May 1989, and Latvia in July 1989. The Baltic Way, that took place on 23 August 1989, became the biggest manifestation of opposition to the Soviet rule. In December 1989, the Congress of People's Deputies of the Soviet Union condemned the Molotov–Ribbentrop Pact and its secret protocol as "legally untenable and invalid."

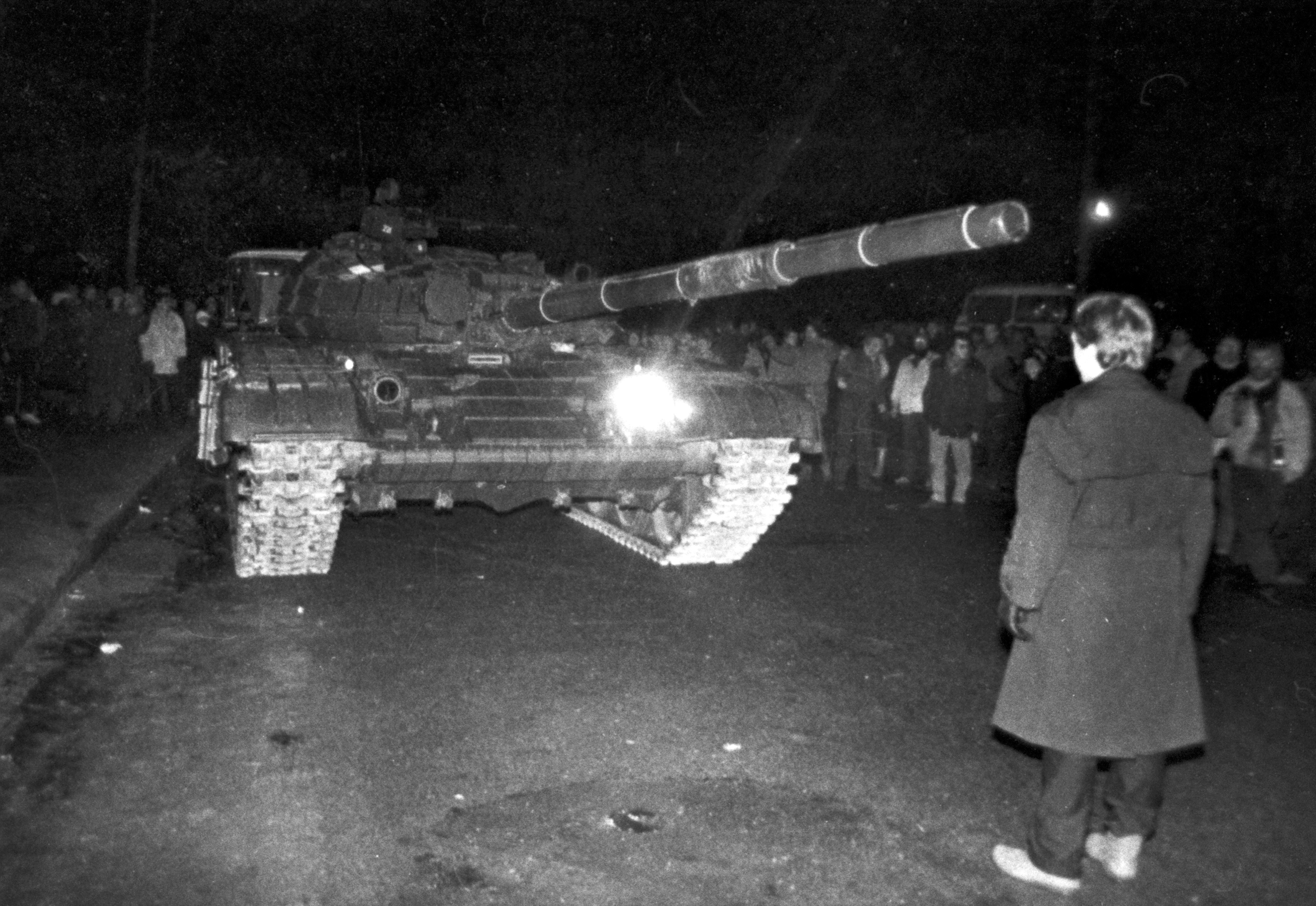
Unarmed Lithuanian citizen standing against a Soviet tank during the January Events

On 11 March 1990, the Lithuanian Supreme Soviet declared Lithuania's independence. Pro-independence candidates had received an overwhelming majority in the Supreme Soviet elections held earlier that year. On 30 March 1990, seeing full restoration of independence not yet feasible due to large Soviet presence, the Estonian Supreme Soviet declared the Soviet Union an occupying power and announced the start of a transitional period to independence. On 4 May 1990, the Latvian Supreme Soviet made a similar declaration. The Soviet Union immediately condemned all three declarations as illegal, saying that they had to go through the process of secession outlined in the Soviet Constitution of 1977. However, the Baltic states argued that the entire occupation process violated both international law and their own law. Therefore, they argued, they were merely reasserting an independence that still existed under international law.

By mid-June, after unsuccessful economic blockade of Lithuania, the Soviets started negotiations with Lithuania and the other two Baltic republics. The Soviets had a bigger challenge elsewhere, as the Russian Federal Republic proclaimed sovereignty in June. Simultaneously the Baltic republics also started to negotiate directly with the Russian Federal Republic. After the failed negotiations, the Soviets made a dramatic but failed attempt to break the deadlock and sent in military troops, killing twenty and injuring hundreds of civilians in what became known as the "Vilnius massacre" in Lithuania and "The Barricades" in Latvia, during January 1991. In August 1991, the hard-line members attempted to take control of the Soviet Union. A day after the coup on 21 August, the Estonians proclaimed full independence, after an independence referendum was held in Estonia on 3 March 1991, alongside a similar referendum in Latvia the same month. It was approved by 78.4% of voters, with an 82.9% turnout. Independence was restored by the Estonian Supreme Council on the night of 20 August. The Latvian parliament made a similar declaration on the same day. The coup failed, but the collapse of the Soviet Union became unavoidable. After the coup collapsed, the Soviet government recognised the independence of all three Baltic states on 6 September 1991.

==== Withdrawal of Russian troops and decommissioning the radars ====
The Russian Federation assumed the burden and the subsequent withdrawal of the occupation force, consisting of about 150,000 former Soviet, now Russian, troops stationed in the Baltic states. In 1992, there were still 120,000 Russian troops there, as well as a large number of military pensioners, particularly in Estonia and Latvia.

During the period of negotiations, Russia hoped to retain facilities such as the Liepāja naval base, the Skrunda anti-ballistic missile radar station, the Ventspils space-monitoring station in Latvia, and the Paldiski submarine base in Estonia, as well as transit rights to Kaliningrad through Lithuania.

Contention arose when Russia threatened to keep its troops where they were. Moscow tied its concessions to specific legislation guaranteeing the civil rights of ethnic Russians, which was seen as an implied threat in the West, in the U.N. General Assembly, and by Baltic leaders, who viewed it as Russian imperialism.

Lithuania was the first to see the complete withdrawal of Russian troops—on 31 August 1993—owing in part to the Kaliningrad issue.

Subsequent agreements to withdraw troops from Latvia were signed on 30 April 1994, and from Estonia on 26 July 1994. Continued linkage on the part of Russia resulted in a threat by the U.S. Senate in mid-July to halt all aid to Russia in case the forces were not withdrawn by the end of August. Final withdrawal was completed on 31 August 1994. Some Russian troops remained stationed in Estonia in Paldiski until the Russian military base was dismantled and the nuclear reactors suspended operations on 26 September 1995. Russia operated the Skrunda-1 radar station until it was decommissioned on 31 August 1998. The Russian Government then had to dismantle and remove the radar equipment; this work was completed by October 1999 when the site was returned to Latvia. The last Russian soldier left the region that month, marking a symbolic end to the Russian military presence on Baltic soil.

== Civilian toll ==
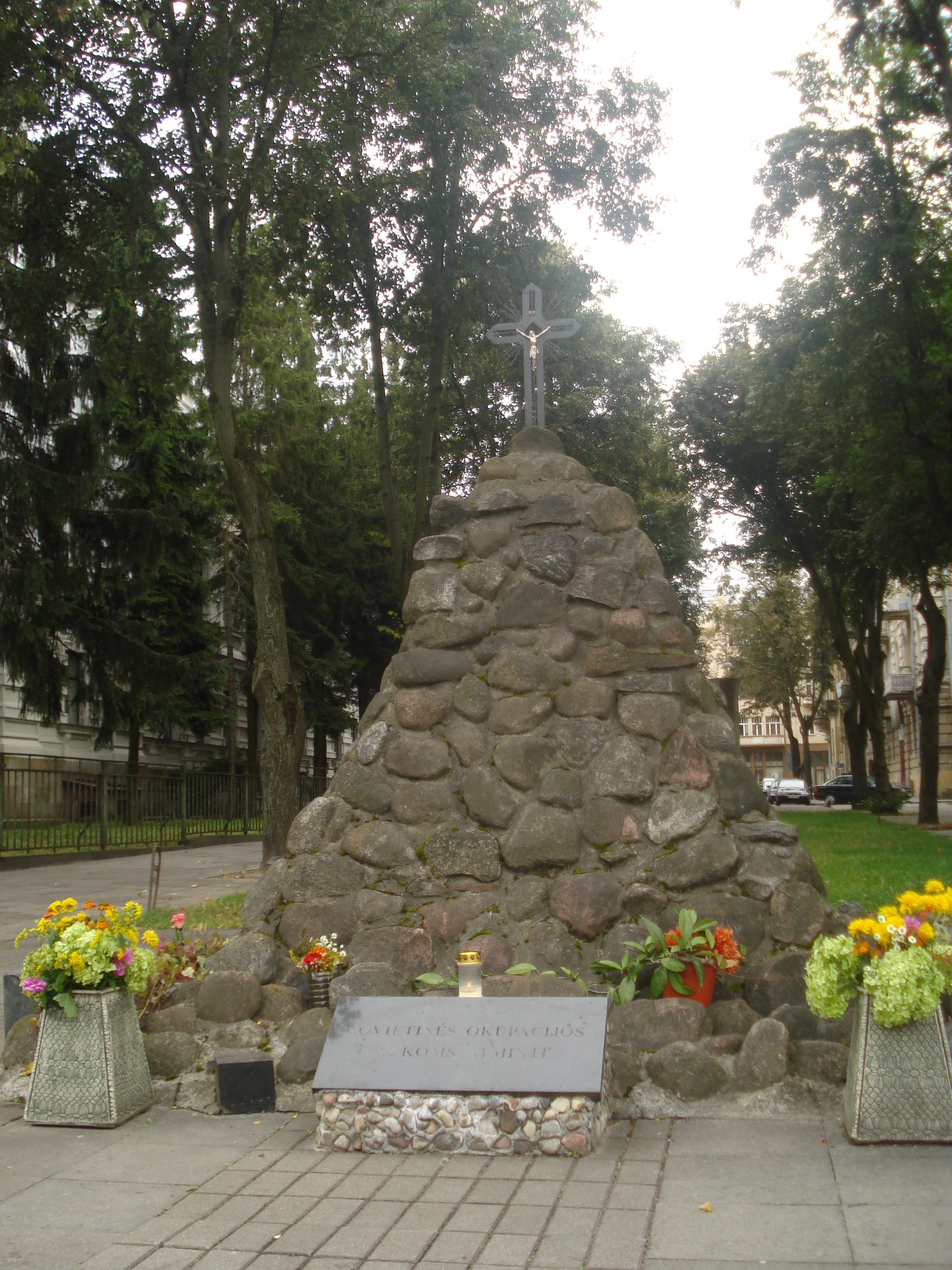
Monument to Lithuanian victims of Soviet occupation in Gediminas Avenue, Vilnius. 54°41′18.9″N 25°16′14.0″E.

During the 1940–1941 and 1944–1991 occupations, 605,000 inhabitants of the three countries in total were either killed or deported (135,000 Estonians, 170,000 Latvians and 320,000 Lithuanians). Their properties and personal belonging were confiscated and given to newly arrived colonists—economic migrants, Soviet military, NKVD personnel, as well as functionaries of the Communist Party.

The estimated human costs of the occupations are presented in the table below.

| Period/action | Estonia | Latvia | Lithuania |
|---|---|---|---|
| Population | 1,126,413 (1934) | 1,905,000 (1935) | 2,575,400 (1938) |
First Soviet Occupation
| June 1941 deportation | 9,267 (2,409 executed) | 15,424 (9,400 died en route) | 17,500 |
| Victims of repressions (arrest, torture, political trials imprisonment or other sanctions) | 8,000 | 21,000 | 12,900 |
| Extrajudicial executions | 2,000 | Not known | 3,000 |
Nazi Occupation
| Mass killing of local minorities | 992 Jews 300 Roma | 70,000 Jews 1,900 Roma | 196,000 Jews ~4,000 Roma |
| Killing of Jews from outside | 8,000 | 20,000 | Not known |
| Killing of other civilians | 7,000 | 16,300 | 45,000 |
| Forced labour | 3,000 | 16,800 | 36,500 |
Second Soviet Occupation
| Operation Priboi 1948–49 | 1949: 20,702 3,000 died en route | 1949: 42,231 8,000 died en route | 1948: 41,000 1949: 32,735 |
| Other deportations between 1945 and 1956 | 650 | 1,700 | 59,200 |
| Arrests and political imprisonment | 30,000 11,000 perished | 32,000 | 186,000 |
| Post-war partisans killed or imprisoned | 8,468 4,000 killed | 8,000 3,000 killed | 21,500 |

== Consequences ==
The Baltic States maintain that the occupations during the war and the Soviet occupation after it had significant demographic, social, and economic consequences, causing huge damage in all spheres, including the damage to the environment. All three countries suffered depopulation and repression. It is estimated that during the 1939–1945 wartime occupations alone, Estonia, Latvia, and Lithuania lost 25%, 30%, and 15% of their populations respectively.

The Baltic states suffered huge economic losses because of the Soviet occupation, but estimates vary due to different methodologies. In 1995, Lithuania estimated that the occupation caused more than 23 billion euros (at the prices of that time) in damage, including loss of population, destruction of property, economic collapse, and other losses. However, this methodology does not assess the losses in economic growth. Economically, Lithuania was a net donor to the USSR budget. The country suffered the most before 1958, when more than half of the annual national budgets were sent to the USSR budget; later, this figure decreased, but remained high until 1973, when it was about 25% of the annual national budgets; in total, Lithuania sent about a third of all its annual national budgets to the USSR budget during the entire period of occupation. The special Latvian commission in 2016 calculated the economic damage of the occupation using a different methodology and estimated it at 185 billion euros (at the prices of that year). According to the Estonian estimates in 2005, the economic losses from the last period of the Soviet occupation alone exceed 100 billion dollars.

During the occupation period, the Baltic states suffered significant economic underdevelopment and lag compared to the other European countries. For example, in the late interwar period, Latvia's GDP per capita in international dollars (PPP) did not differ significantly from Finland's, but by 1965, it had already fallen to 64% of Finland's level (Finland – $2,221, Latvia – $1,418). In 1975, this figure was 45%; in 1986, it was 50%, and in 1990, it was 45%, so by the end of the Soviet occupation, Latvia's GDP per capita (PPP) was less than half that of Finland. Pre-war Estonia was also at a similar economic level to Finland, but experienced similar economic lag and underdevelopment during the occupation.

The Soviet Union and its successor Russia have never paid reparations to the Baltic countries.

Due to colonization and russification, the Soviet occupation also significantly changed the demographic and linguistic situation, especially in Latvia and Estonia. In 1944, Estonians made up 88–90% of the population, but according to the 1989 census, this number had decreased to 61.5%. In Latvia, between 1945 and 1955 alone, the number of immigrants reached 535,000, most of whom came from Russia. In 1940, Latvians made up about 79% of Latvia's population, but by 1989 this number had dropped to 52%.

According to Israeli author Yaël Ronen of the Minerva Center for Human Rights at the Hebrew University of Jerusalem, illegal regimes typically take measures to change the demographic structure of the territory held by the regime, usually via two methods: the forced removal of the local population, and the transfer of their own populations into the territory. He cites the case of the Baltic states as an example of where this phenomenon has occurred, with the deportations of 1949 combined with large waves of immigration in 1945–1950 and 1961–1970. When the illegal regime transitioned to a lawful regime in 1991, the status of these settlers became an issue.

The collapse of the USSR also left lingering questions about what to do with remaining Soviet architectural structures in the region, many of which were uniquely designed with the aid of local architects, but poorly built as a result of general Soviet-era construction issues — with ongoing safety implications. "To pour money into reconstructing or restoring a Soviet monument that will only serve to remind the populace of a former occupying force or the destruction of a Jewish cemetery is clearly offensive given the violence they symbolize to local populations," wrote author Aliide Naylor. Some attempts to repurpose buildings have taken place, and the majority of Soviet monuments have been removed from public view. For example, in 2022, Latvia removed the imposing Monument to the Liberators of Soviet Latvia and Riga from the German Fascist Invaders as despite its propagandistic name, it was considered a symbol of terror and occupation to locals. However, the Tehumardi Soviet propaganda monument on the island of Saaremaa is unique in Estonia, in that it ended up being preserved "due to its sheer size and monumentality". It was subsequently artistically reinterpreted in late 2025 with the red star being removed, carved stone faces cleaned and previous text replaced.

== Legal and historical perspectives ==
The Baltic states' governments themselves, the United States and its courts of law, the European Parliament, the European Court of Human Rights, and the United Nations Human Rights Council have all stated that these three countries were invaded, occupied, and illegally incorporated into the Soviet Union under provisions of the 1939 Molotov–Ribbentrop Pact. There followed occupation by Nazi Germany from 1941 to 1944 and then again occupation by the Soviet Union from 1944 to 1991. This policy of non-recognition has given rise to the principle of legal continuity of the Baltic states, which holds that de jure, or as a matter of law, the Baltic states remained independent states under illegal occupation throughout the period from 1940 to 1991. The Baltic states have repeatedly sought financial compensation from Russia for damages inflicted during the illegal occupation, both individually and collectively.

However, the Soviet Union never formally acknowledged that its presence in the Baltics was an occupation or that it had annexed these states and considered the Estonian Soviet Socialist Republic, Latvian Soviet Socialist Republic, and Lithuanian Soviet Socialist Republics three of its constituent republics. On the other hand, the Russian Soviet Federative Socialist Republic recognized in 1991 that the events of 1940 were an "annexation".

Historically revisionist Russian historiography and school textbooks continue to maintain that the Baltic states voluntarily joined the Soviet Union after each of their peoples carried out socialist revolutions independent of Soviet influence. The post-Soviet government of Russia and its state officials insist that incorporation of the Baltic states was in accordance with international law and gained de jure recognition by the agreements made in the February 1945 Yalta Conference, the July–August 1945 Potsdam Conference, and by the 1975 Helsinki Accords, which declared the inviolability of existing frontiers. However, this claim has been described by British army think tank CHACR as both "nefarious" and a "horrifying insult"—part of an intentional propaganda campaign to spread a myth of Baltic "incorporation". Russia also agreed to Europe's demand to "assist persons deported from the occupied Baltic states" upon joining the Council of Europe in 1996. Also, when the Russian Soviet Federative Socialist Republic signed a separate treaty with Lithuania in 1991, it acknowledged the 1940 annexation as a violation of Lithuanian sovereignty and recognised the de jure continuity of the Lithuanian state.

== State continuity of the Baltic states ==
The Baltic claim of continuity with the pre-war republics has been accepted by most Western powers. As a consequence of the policy of non-recognition of the Soviet seizure of these countries, combined with the resistance by the Baltic people to the Soviet regime, the uninterrupted functioning of rudimentary state organs in exile in combination with the fundamental legal principle of ex injuria jus non oritur, that no legal benefit can be derived from an illegal act, the seizure of the Baltic states was judged to be illegal thus sovereign title never passed to the Soviet Union and the Baltic states continued to exist as subjects of international law.

The official position of Russia, which chose in 1991 to be the legal and direct successor of the USSR, is that Estonia, Latvia, and Lithuania joined the Soviet Union freely and of their own accord in 1940, and, with the dissolution of the USSR, these countries became newly created entities in 1991. Russia's stance is based upon the desire to avoid financial liability, since acknowledging the Soviet occupation would set the stage for future compensation claims from the Baltic states.

== Reparations for the illegal occupation ==
The principle of the legal continuity of the Baltic states recognized by the international community, holds that de jure, or as a matter of law, the Baltic states remained independent states under illegal occupation throughout the period from 1940 to 1991. However, during the illegal occupation, the Baltic states suffered damages valued at hundreds of billions of dollars. A report by an independent commission formed by the Latvian government in 2016 concluded that the criminal actions of the Soviet occupation had inflicted on Latvia alone constituted over €185 billion in economic damages. In 2011, a report concluded that the damage continued to incur costs to the Latvian government of €100 million a year.

The Baltic states have repeatedly sought financial reparations from Russia for damages inflicted during the illegal occupation, both individually and collectively.

In 2000, the Seimas (Lithuania's parliament) passed a law seeking compensation from Russia for the criminal damages inflicted upon Lithuania during the illegal Soviet occupation of the Baltics. The move was endorsed by then-Estonian Prime Minister Mart Laar and then-Latvian Prime Minister Andris Bērziņš, who both supported cooperation in the Baltic Assembly on the issue.

In 2008, the Lithuanian government again stated that seeking financial compensation from Russia for the illegal Soviet occupation of Lithuania was a priority. In 2011, Lithuania continued to seek reparations, with foreign minister Audronius Azubalis labeling it "ridiculous to talk with Russia without resolving issues related to the occupation." On 23 May 2012, Lithuanian Prime Minister Andrius Kubilius formed a commission to move the issue forward and called for the issue of financial compensation from Russia to be included as a condition of EU-Russia relations.

== Soviet and Russian historiography ==
Soviet historians saw the 1940 annexation as a voluntary entry into the USSR by the Balts. Soviet historiography promoted the interests of Russia and the USSR in the Baltic area, and it reflected the belief of most Russians that they had moral and historical rights to control and to Russianize the entire former Russian empire. To Soviet historians, the 1940 annexation was not only a voluntary entry but was also the natural thing to do. This concept taught that the military security of mother Russia was solidified and that nothing could argue against it.

=== Soviet point of view ===
Prior to perestroika, the Soviet Union denied the existence of the secret protocols and viewed the events of 1939–40 as follows:

- the government of the Soviet Union suggested that the governments of the Baltic countries conclude mutual assistance treaties between the countries.
- Pressure from working people forced the governments of the Baltic countries to accept this suggestion. The pacts were then signed.
- These pacts allowed the USSR to station a limited number of Red Army units in the Baltic countries.
- Economic difficulties and dissatisfaction of the populace with Baltic government policies had impeded fulfilment of the pacts, and the populace revolted against the Baltic governments' political orientation towards Germany in a revolution in June 1940.
- To guarantee fulfilment of the pact additional military units entered the Baltic countries, welcomed by workers, who demanded the resignations of the governments.
- In June, workers demonstrated under the leadership of the Communist parties of the Baltic countries.
- The fascist governments were overthrown, and workers' governments formed.
- In July 1940, elections for Baltic parliaments were held.
- The "Working People's Unions", created by the Communist parties, received the majority of the votes.
- The parliaments adopted declarations restoring Soviet powers in Baltic countries and proclaimed the Soviet Socialist Republics. Declarations of Estonia's, Latvia's, and Lithuania's wishes to join the USSR were adopted and the Supreme Soviet of the USSR was petitioned accordingly.
- The requests were approved by the Supreme Soviet of the USSR.

The Stalin-edited Falsifiers of History, published in 1948, says the June 1940 invasions were needed because "[p]acts had been concluded with the Baltic States, but there were as yet no Soviet troops there capable of holding the defences". It also states regarding those invasions that "[o]nly enemies of democracy or people who had lost their senses could describe those actions of the Soviet Government as aggression".

In the reassessment of Soviet history during perestroika, the USSR condemned the 1939 secret protocol between itself and Germany that led to the invasion and occupations in the Baltic countries.

=== Russian historiography in the post-Soviet era ===
During the Soviet era, there was relatively little interest in the history of the Baltic states, which historians generally treated as a single entity due to the uniformity of Soviet policy in these territories.

Since the fall of the Soviet Union, two general camps have evolved in Russian historiography. One, the liberal-democratic (либерально-демократическое), condemns Stalin's actions and the Molotov–Ribbentrop pact and does not consider the Baltic states as having joined the USSR voluntarily. The other, the national-patriotic (национально-патриотическое), contends that the Molotov–Ribbentrop pact was necessary to the security of the Soviet Union, that the Baltics' joining the USSR was the will of the proletariat—both in line with the politics of the Soviet period, "the 'need to ensure the security of the USSR', 'people's revolution' and 'joining voluntarily'"—and that supporters of Baltic independence were the operatives of western intelligence agencies seeking to topple the USSR.

Soviet-Russian historian Vilnis Sīpols argues that Stalin's ultimatums of 1940 were defensive measures taken against the German threat and had no connection with the 'socialist revolutions' in the Baltic states. The arguments that the USSR had to annex the Baltic states in order to defend the security of those countries and to avoid German invasion into the three republics can also be found in the college textbook "The Modern History of Fatherland".

Sergey Chernichenko, a jurist and vice-president of the Russian Association of International Law, argues there was no declared state of war between the Baltic states and the Soviet Union in 1940, and that Soviet troops occupied the Baltic states with their agreement, and also that USSR violation of prior treaty provisions did not constitute occupation. Subsequent annexation was neither an act of aggression nor forcible and was completely legal according to international law as of 1940. Accusations of "deportation" of Baltic nationals by the Soviet Union are therefore baseless, he says, as individuals cannot be deported within their own country. He claims the Waffen-SS was being convicted at Nuremberg as a criminal organization and their commemoration in the "openly encouraged pro-Nazi" (откровенно поощряются пронацистские) Baltics as heroes seeking to liberate the Baltics from the Soviets) is an act of "nationalistic blindness" (националистическое ослепление). With regard to the current situation in the Baltics, Chernichenko contends the "theory of occupation" is the official thesis used to justify the "discrimination of Russian-speaking inhabitants" in Estonia and Latvia and prophesies the three Baltic governments will fail in their "attempt to rewrite history".

According to the revisionist historian Oleg Platonov, "from the point of view of the national interests of Russia, unification was historically just, as it returned to the composition of the state ancient Russian lands, albeit partially inhabited by other peoples". The Molotov–Ribbentrop pact and protocols, including the dismemberment of Poland, merely redressed the tearing away from Russia of its historical territories by "anti-Russian revolution" and "foreign intervention".

On the other hand, Professor and Dean of the School of International Relations and Vice-Rector of Saint Petersburg State University, Konstantin K. Khudoley, views the 1940 annexation of the Baltic states as involuntary. He considers the elections were not free and fair and the decisions of the newly elected parliaments to join the Soviet Union cannot be considered legitimate as these decisions were not approved by the upper chambers of the parliaments of the respective Baltic states. He also contends that the annexation of the Baltic states had no military value in defence of possible German aggression, as it bolstered anti-Soviet public opinion in future allies Britain and the US and turned the native populations against the Soviet Union; the subsequent guerrilla movement in the Baltic states after the Second World War caused domestic problems for the Soviet Union.

=== Position of the Russian Federation ===
With the advent of Perestroika and its reassessment of Soviet history, the Supreme Soviet of the USSR in 1989 condemned the 1939 secret protocol between Germany and the Soviet Union that had led to the division of Eastern Europe and the invasion and occupation of the three Baltic countries.

While this action did not state the Soviet presence in the Baltics was an occupation, the Russian Soviet Federated Socialist Republic and Republic of Lithuania affirmed so in a subsequent agreement in the midst of the collapse of the Soviet Union. Russia, in the preamble of its 29 July 1991, "Treaty Between the Russian Soviet Federated Socialist Republic and the Republic of Lithuania on the Basis for Relations between States", declared that once the USSR had eliminated the consequences of the 1940 annexation which violated Lithuania's sovereignty, Lithuania–Russia relations would further improve.

However, Russia's current official position directly contradicts its earlier rapprochement with Lithuania as well as its signature of membership to the Council of Europe, where it agreed to the obligations and commitments including "iv. as regards the compensation for those persons deported from the occupied Baltic states and the descendants of deportees, as stated in Opinion No. 193 (1996), paragraph 7.xii, to settle these issues as quickly as possible....". The Russian government and state officials maintain now that the Soviet annexation of the Baltic states was legitimate and that the Soviet Union liberated the countries from the Nazis. They assert that the Soviet troops initially entered the Baltic countries in 1940 following agreements and the consent of the Baltic governments. Their position is that the USSR was not in a state of war or engaged in combat activities on the territories of the three Baltic states, therefore, the word "occupation" cannot be used. "The assertions about [the] 'occupation' by the Soviet Union and the related claims ignore all legal, historical and political realities, and are therefore utterly groundless".—Russian Foreign Ministry.

This particular Russian viewpoint is called the "Myth of 1939–40" by international affairs professor David Mendeloff, who states that the assertion that Soviet Union neither "occupied" the Baltic states in 1939 nor "annexed" them the following year is widely held and deeply embedded in Russian historical consciousness.

== Treaties affecting USSR–Baltic relations ==
The Baltic states proclaimed independence after the signing of the Armistice, and Bolshevik Russia invaded at the end of 1918. Izvestia wrote in its 25 December 1918 issue: "Estonia, Latvia, and Lithuania are directly on the road from Russia to Western Europe and therefore a hindrance to our revolutions... This separating wall has to be destroyed". Bolshevik Russia, however, did not gain control of the Baltic States, and in 1920, concluded peace treaties with all three of them. Subsequently, at the initiative of the Soviet Union, additional non-aggression treaties were concluded with all three Baltic States:

- Peace treaties
- Non-aggression treaties
- Kellogg-Briand Pact and Litvinov's Pact
- The Convention for the Definition of Aggression
- The Pacts of Mutual Assistance
- Treaties the USSR signed between 1940 and 1945

== See also ==
- Kersten Committee
- January 1991 events in the aftermath of the Act of the Re-Establishment of the State of Lithuania, resulting in deaths and injuries
- Museum of Occupations, Tallinn, a project by the Kistler-Ritso Estonian Foundation
- Occupations of Latvia
- Population transfer in the Soviet Union
- Soviet involvement in regime change
  - Russian involvement in regime change, covering instances post-1991
- State continuity of the Baltic states
- Territorial changes of the Baltic states
- United States resolution on the 90th anniversary of the Latvian Republic
- Welles Declaration

== Bibliography ==
- Anušauskas, Arvydas; Banionis, Juozas; Bauža, Česlovas (2007). Lietuva 1940–1990: okupuotos Lietuvos istorija (in Lithuanian). Lietuvos gyventojų genocido ir rezistencijos tyrimo centras. ISBN 9789986757788.
- Aust, Anthony (2005). Handbook of International Law. Cambridge University Press. ISBN 978-0521530347.
- Bellamy, Chris (2007). Absolute War: Soviet Russia in the Second World War. Alfred a Knopf Inc. ISBN 978-0375410864.
- Brecher, Michael; Jonathan Wilkenfeld (1997). A Study of Crisis. University of Michigan Press. p. 596. ISBN 978-0472108060. Archived from the original on 10 February 2023.
- Estonian State Commission on Examination of the Policies of Repression (2005). The White Book: Losses Inflicted on the Estonian Nation by Occupation Regimes, 1940-1991 (PDF). Estonian Encyclopaedia Publishers. ISBN 9985-70-195-X. Archived (PDF) from the original on 14 January 2013.
- Frucht, Richard (2005). Eastern Europe: An Introduction to the People, Lands, and Culture. ABC-CLIO. p. 132. ISBN 978-1576078006. Archived from the original on 21 January 2023.
- Gerner, Kristian; Hedlund, Stefan (1993). The Baltic States and the End of the Soviet Empire. Routledge. ISBN 978-0415075701.
- Hiden, Johan; Salmon, Patrick (1994) [1991]. The Baltic Nations and Europe (Revised ed.). Harlow, England: Longman. ISBN 058225650X.
- Hiden, John (2008). Vahur Made; David J. Smith (eds.). The Baltic question during the Cold War. Routledge. ISBN 978-0415371001. Archived from the original on 10 February 2023.
- Mälksoo, Lauri (2003). Illegal Annexation and State Continuity: The Case of the Incorporation of the Baltic States by the USSR. M. Nijhoff Publishers. ISBN 9041121773. Archived from the original on 17 January 2023.
- Marek, Krystyna (1968) [1954]. Identity and continuity of states in public international law (2 ed.). Geneva, Switzerland: Libr. Droz.
- McHugh, James; James S. Pacy (2001). Diplomats without a country: Baltic diplomacy, international law, and the Cold War. Greenwood Publishing Group. ISBN 0313318786. Archived from the original on 10 February 2023.
- Misiunas, Romuald J.; Taagepera, Rein (1993). The Baltic States, years of dependence, 1940–1990. University of California Press. ISBN 0520082281.
- O'Connor, Kevin (2003). The History of the Baltic States. Greenwood Publishing Group. pp. 113–145. ISBN 978-0313323553. Archived from the original on 10 February 2023.
- Petrov, Pavel (2008). Punalipuline Balti Laevastik ja Eesti 1939–1941 (in Estonian). Tänapäev. ISBN 978-9985626313. Archived from the original on 3 March 2016.
- Plakans, Andrejs (2007). Experiencing Totalitarianism: The Invasion and Occupation of Latvia by the USSR and Nazi Germany 1939–1991. AuthorHouse. p. 596. ISBN 978-1434315731. Archived from the original on 10 February 2023.
- Rislakki, Jukka (2008). The Case for Latvia. Disinformation Campaigns Against a Small Nation. Rodopi. ISBN 978-9042024243. Archived from the original on 10 February 2023.
- Talmon, Stefan (1998). Recognition of governments in international law. Oxford University Press. ISBN 978-0198265733. Archived from the original on 10 February 2023.
- Tsygankov, Andrei P. (May 2009). Russophobia (1st ed.). Palgrave Macmillan. ISBN 978-0230614185.
- Wyman, David; Charles H. Rosenzveig (1996). The World Reacts to the Holocaust. JHU Press. pp. 365–381. ISBN 978-0801849695. Archived from the original on 10 February 2023.
- Ziemele, Ineta (2005). State Continuity and Nationality: The Baltic States and Russia. Martinus Nijhoff Publishers. ISBN 9004142959.
