= Baltic–Soviet relations =

International relations between Baltic states and Soviet Union

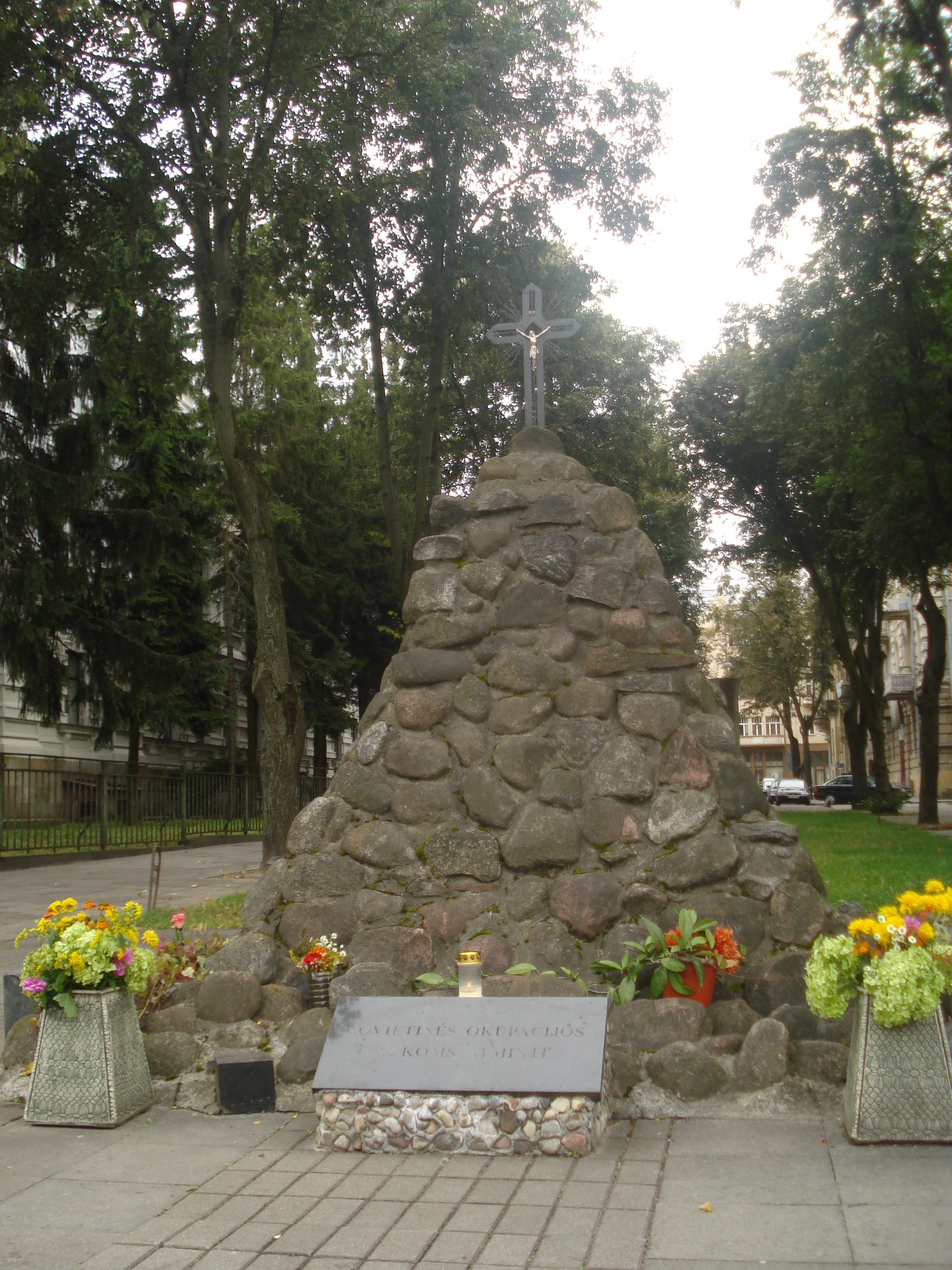
Monument of Lithuanian victims of Soviet occupation in Gediminas Avenue of Vilnius

Relevant events began regarding the Baltic states and the Soviet Union when, following Bolshevist Russia's conflict with the Baltic states—Lithuania, Latvia and Estonia—several peace treaties were signed with Russia and its successor, the Soviet Union. In the late 1920s and early 1930s, the Soviet Union and all three Baltic States further signed non-aggression treaties. The Soviet Union also confirmed that it would adhere to the Kellogg–Briand Pact with regard to its neighbors, including Estonia and Latvia, and entered into a convention defining "aggression" that included all three Baltic countries.

In 1939, the Soviet Union and Nazi Germany entered the Molotov–Ribbentrop Pact, which included secret protocols dividing eastern Europe into "spheres of influence", with Latvia and Estonia falling within the Soviets' sphere. A later amendment to the secret protocols placed Lithuania within the Soviets' sphere. In June 1940, the Soviet Union invaded the Baltic countries and annexed those countries as the Lithuanian Soviet Socialist Republic, Estonian Soviet Socialist Republic and Latvian Soviet Socialist Republic. In 1941, as part of Operation Barbarossa, Germany invaded the Baltic countries, subsequently administered under Germany's Ostland until 1944. In 1944, the Soviet Union reoccupied the Baltic states from Nazi Germany.

The territories of Baltic states remained under Soviet control as Soviet Socialist Republics until 1991. A majority of Western world governments did not recognise the Soviet annexations of the Baltic states de jure, though some countries did recognize them de facto. In July 1989, following the dramatic events in East Germany, the Supreme Soviets of the Baltic countries stated their intention to restore full independence. In 1991, the Baltic countries reclaimed independence and restored their sovereignty upon the dissolution of the Soviet Union.

== Russian Revolution and treaties affecting USSR–Baltic relations ==
Bolsheviks took power following the Russian Revolution of 1917. After the Baltic states proclaimed independence following the signing of the Armistice, Bolshevist Russia invaded at the end of 1918. Известия (Izvestia) published in its December 25, 1918 issue that "Estonia, Latvia, and Lithuania are directly on the road from Russia to Western Europe and therefore a hindrance to our revolutions. ... This separating wall has to be destroyed." Bolshevist Russia, however, did not gain control of the Baltics and in 1920 concluded peace treaties with all three states.

=== Peace treaties ===
- Estonia, Treaty of Tartu on 2 February 1920
- Lithuania, Soviet–Lithuanian Peace Treaty on 12 July 1920
- Latvia, Treaty of Riga on 11 August 1920

In these treaties, Bolshevist Russia renounced "for eternity" all sovereign rights over these three peoples and territories which formerly belonged to Russia. In 1922, the Russian SFSR, Ukraine SSR, Byelorussian SSR and Transcaucasian SFSR were officially merged as republics creating the Union of Soviet Socialist Republics, or Soviet Union.

=== Non-aggression treaties ===
Subsequently, at the initiative of the Soviet Union, additional non-aggression treaties were concluded with all three Baltic States:

- Lithuania, on September 28, 1926
- Latvia, on February 5, 1932
- Estonia, on May 4, 1932

The contracting parties undertook to refrain from acts of aggression against one another, and from any acts of violence directed against the territorial integrity and inviolability or the political independence of the other contracting party. Furthermore, they agreed to submit all disputes regardless of origin which could not be settled diplomatically to a formal conciliation in a joint committee.

=== Kellogg-Briand Pact and Litvinov's Pact ===
On August 27, 1928, the Kellogg-Briand Pact renouncing war as an instrument of national policy was adopted by the United States, Germany, Belgium, France, Great Britain, India, Italy, Japan, Poland, and the Czechoslovak Republic. Following this adoption, the Soviet Union signed a protocol confirming adherence to the terms of the Pact with its neighbors: Estonia, Latvia, Poland, and Romania on February 9, 1929. (See also Litvinov's Pact). Lithuania declared its adherence to the pact and protocol soon thereafter, on April 5, 1929. In signing, the contracting parties agreed:

- to condemn war as a recourse to solving conflict and to renounce it as an instrument of policy, and
- that all conflicts and disputes be settled only by peaceful means.

With this confirmation of adherence to these protocols (while not yet having ratified the Pact) and associated filings of instruments of adherence to the Pact, Estonia, Latvia, Lithuania and the USSR (listed as Russia) became signatories to the Kellogg-Briand Pact itself the day it came into effect, on July 24, 1929.

=== The Convention for the Definition of Aggression ===
On July 3, 1933, for the first time in history, aggression was defined in a binding treaty signed at the Soviet Embassy in London by the USSR and among others, Baltic countries. Article II defines forms of aggression "There shall be recognized as an aggressor that State which shall be the first to have committed one of the following actions:

- First—a declaration of war on another State.
- Second—invasion by armed forces of the territory of another State even without a declaration of war.
- Third—attack by its land, sea or air forces, even without declaration of war upon the territory, on the vessels or flying machines of another State.
- Fourth—a naval blockade of coasts or ports of another State.
- Fifth—support accorded armed bands which are organized on its territory and which shall have invaded the territory of another State; or refusal, in spite of the demand of the invaded State, to take on its own territory all steps in its power to deprive the bandits aforesaid of all aid or protection."

The Convention for the Definition of Aggression Article II then states that "no political, military, economic or other considerations may serve as an excuse or justification for the aggression referred to in Article II." And while the annex to Article III lists conceivable reasons for intervention in a neighboring state, it also stipulates that "the High Contracting Parties further agree to recognize that the present convention "can never legitimate any violations of International Law that may be implied in the circumstances comprised in the above list."

== Molotov–Ribbentrop Pact and 1939 ultimatum ==
On August 24, 1939, the Soviet Union and Nazi Germany signed the Molotov–Ribbentrop pact, which contained a secret protocol dividing the states of Northern and Eastern Europe into German and Soviet "spheres of influence". Finland, Estonia and Latvia were assigned to the Soviet sphere. Lithuania would be in the German sphere of influence, although a second secret protocol agreed in September 1939 assigned majority of Lithuania to the USSR.

Bowing to Soviet pressure, Estonia, Latvia, and Lithuania were given no choice but to sign a so-called Pact of defence and mutual assistance which permitted the Soviet Union to station troops in them. These pacts affirmed the sovereign rights of the Baltic states. For example, the Pact of Mutual Assistance with Latvia (signed on October 5, 1939) declares: "The enforcement of the present Pact may in no way impair the sovereign rights of the Contracting Parties, more especially with regard to their political structure, economic and social systems, and military measures."

== 1940 Soviet invasions and annexations ==
In mid-June 1940, when international attention was focused on the German invasion of France, Soviet NKVD troops raided border posts in Lithuania, Estonia and Latvia. State administrations were liquidated and replaced by Soviet cadres, Elections were held with single pro-Soviet candidates listed for many positions, with resulting peoples assemblies immediately requested admission into the USSR, which was granted by the Soviet Union.

== 1941–1944 German invasions and occupations ==
Germany invaded and occupied the territories of Baltic states in 1941 during Operation Barbarossa. At the beginning the Lithuanians, Latvians and Estonians hoped that the Germans would reestablish Baltic independence. Such political hopes soon evaporated and Baltic cooperation became less forthright or ceased altogether. From 1941 to 1944, following Operation Barbarossa, the Baltic countries were a part of Germany's Ostland.

In September 1941, the Soviet Union joined the Atlantic Charter which affirmed, among other things, the "desire to see no territorial changes that do not accord with the freely expressed wishes of the peoples concerned" and to "respect the rights of all peoples to choose the form of government under which they will live; and they wish to see sovereign rights and self-government restored to those who have been forcibly deprived of them. ..."

== 1944 Soviet invasions and occupations ==
The Soviet Union reoccupied the Baltic states as part of the Baltic Offensive in 1944. In 1945, the Soviet Union signed the Yalta Declaration declaring for the reestablishment of order in Europe according to the principle of the Atlantic Charter "the right of all peoples to choose the form of government under which they will live, the restoration of sovereign rights and self-government to those peoples who have been forcibly deprived of them by the aggressor nations." The Yalta declaration further states that "to foster the conditions in which the liberated peoples may exercise these rights, the three governments will join ... among others to facilitate where necessary the holding of free elections."

After the Soviet re-invasion, the Baltic countries remained the Soviet Socialist Republics of the Estonian Soviet Socialist Republic, the Latvian Soviet Socialist Republic and the Lithuanian Soviet Socialist Republic. On 12 January 1949 the Soviet Council of Ministers issued a decree "on the expulsion and deportation" from Baltic states of "all kulaks and their families, the families of bandits and nationalists", and others. Ten percent of the entire adult Baltic population was deported or sent to labor camps. After World War II, as part of the goal to more fully integrate Baltic countries into the Soviet Union, mass deportations were concluded in the Baltic countries and the policy of encouraging Soviet immigration to the Baltic states continued.

The majority of States refused to recognize the Soviet incorporation of the Baltic states. Hopes on the part of the Baltic states for any active intervention on their behalf were quashed when the United States, European states and Soviet Union signed the Helsinki Accords of 1975 which committed its parties to respecting the established frontiers—avoiding use of the term "borders"—of postwar Europe. Countries such as the United States continued to maintain nonrecognition of the Soviet annexation of the Baltic states. In retrospect, the Baltic states' eventual reestablishment of their independence and borders has been interpreted as vindicating the Accords, which supported human rights and self-determination.

== Treaties the USSR signed between 1940 and 1945 ==
The Soviet Union joined the Atlantic Charter of August 14, 1941, by resolution, signed in London on September 24, 1941. Resolution affirmed:

- "First, their countries seek no aggrandizement, territorial or other;
- "Second, they desire to see no territorial changes that do not accord with the freely expressed wishes of the peoples concerned;
- "Third, they respect the rights of all peoples to choose the form of government under which they will live; and they wish to see sovereign rights and self-government restored to those who have been forcibly deprived of them. ..."

Most importantly, Stalin personally reaffirmed the principles of the Atlantic Charter on November 6, 1941:

We have not and cannot have any such war aims as the seizure of foreign territories and the subjugation of foreign peoples whether it be peoples and territories of Europe or the peoples and territories of Asia....
We have not and cannot have such war aims as the imposition of our will and regime on the Slavs and other enslaved peoples of Europe who are awaiting our aid.
Our aid consists in assisting these peoples in their struggle for liberation from Hitler's tyranny, and then setting them free to rule on their own lands as they desire. No intervention whatever in the internal affairs of other nations.

Soon thereafter, the Soviet Union signed the Declaration by United Nations of January 1, 1942, which again confirmed adherence to the Atlantic Charter.

The Soviet Union signed the Yalta Declaration on Liberated Europe of February 4–11, 1945, in which Stalin, Churchill, and Roosevelt jointly declare for the reestablishment of order in Europe according to the principle of the Atlantic Charter "the right of all peoples to choose the form of government under which they will live, the restoration of sovereign rights and self-government to those peoples who have been forcibly deprived of them by the aggressor nations." The Yalta declaration further states that "to foster the conditions in which the liberated peoples may exercise these rights, the three governments will join ... among others to facilitate where necessary the holding of free elections."

Finally, the Soviet Union signed the Charter of the United Nations on October 24, 1945, which in Article I Part 2 states that one of the "purposes of the United Nations is to develop friendly relations among nations based on respect for the principle of equal rights and self-determination of peoples."

== Independence of the Baltic states ==
In July 1989, following the dramatic events in East Germany, the Supreme Soviets of the Baltic countries adopted a "Declaration of Sovereignties" and amended the Constitutions to assert the supremacy of their own laws over those of the USSR. Candidates from the pro-independence party Popular Fronts gained majority in the Supreme Councils in 1990 democratic elections. The Councils declared their intention to restore full independence. Soviet political and military forces tried unsuccessfully to overthrow the governments. In 1991, Baltic countries claimed de facto independence. International recognition, including that of the USSR, followed. The United States, which had never recognized forcible annexation of the Baltic countries by the USSR, resumed full diplomatic relations with the republics.

Five decades of almost unbroken Soviet occupation of the Baltic states of Estonia, Latvia and Lithuania ended in 1991. The sovereignties of the countries were restored, accelerating to the eventual break-up of the Soviet Union later that year after the three states had seceded. Subsequently, Russia started to withdraw its troops from all three Baltic states. Lithuania was the first to have the Russian troops withdrawn from its territory in August 1993. The last Russian troops withdrew from the Baltic States in August 1994. Russia officially ended its military presence in the Baltics in August 1998 following the decommissioning of the Skrunda-1 radar station in Latvia, which was the last active Russian military radar in the Baltics. The last Russian troops withdrew from the station the following year.

In the reassessment of Soviet history that began during perestroika in 1989, the USSR condemned the 1939 secret protocol between Nazi Germany and itself. However, the USSR never formally acknowledged its presence in the Baltics as an occupation, and considered the Estonian, Latvian and Lithuanian Soviet Socialist Republics as its constituent republics. The Russian government and state officials maintain that the Soviet annexation of the Baltic states was legitimate. (Note: The Putin administration has refused to admit the fact of Soviet occupation of Latvia, Lithuania and Estonia following World War II, although Putin has acknowledged that in 1989, during Gorbachev's reign, the Soviet parliament officially denounced the Molotov-Rippentrop Pact of 1939, which led to the forcible incorporation of the three Baltic states into the Soviet Union.) (Note: Russian officials persistently claim that the Baltic states entered the USSR voluntarily and legally at the close of World War II and failed to acknowledge that Estonia, Latvia, and Lithuania were under Soviet occupation for fifty years.) A distinction was often drawn between de jure and de facto recognition of the states' status as either Soviet Socialist Republics or independent entities.

== Citations and references ==
=== Cited sources ===
- Smith, David James; Pabriks, Artis; Purs, Aldis; Lane, Thomas (2002), The Baltic States: Estonia, Latvia and Lithuania, Routledge, ISBN 0-415-28580-1
- Taagepera, Rein (1993), Estonia: Return to Independence, Westview Press, ISBN 0-8133-1703-7
- Wettig, Gerhard (2008), Stalin and the Cold War in Europe, Rowman & Littlefield, ISBN 978-0-7425-5542-6
