= Adolfas Urbšas =

Lithuanian Army officer (1900–1973)

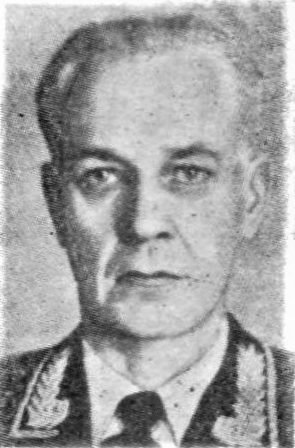
- Urbšas c. 1971
- Born: 7 August 1900; Kirdonys, Russian Empire
- Died: 19 May 1973 (aged 72); Kaunas, Lithuanian SSR, Soviet Union
- Burial place: Petrašiūnai Cemetery
- Education: Kaunas War School; Higher Officers' Courses
- Military career
- Allegiance: Lithuania; Soviet Union
- Branch: Lithuanian Army; Red Army
- Service years: 1920–1955
- Rank: Major general
- Commands: 16th "Lithuanian" Rifle Division
- Conflicts: World War II; Battle of Kursk; Battle of Memel; Courland Pocket

Adolfas Urbšas (18 August 1900 – 19 May 1973) was an officer in the Lithuanian Army and then the Red Army, rising eventually to the rank of major general (1944).

Educated at the Kaunas War School and courses for offices of the general staff, Urbšas was promoted to colonel and assigned as chief of staff of the Lithuanian 3rd Infantry Division in 1938. After the Soviet occupation of Lithuania in 1940, he joined the Red Army. He was assigned as chief of staff of the 16th "Lithuanian" Rifle Division in April 1943 and its commanding officer in September 1944. After the war, he worked as an instructor at the Vystrel course.

== Biography ==
=== In the Lithuanian Army ===
Urbšas was mobilized into the Lithuanian Army in November 1920 just after the Żeligowski's Mutiny. After graduating from the War School of Kaunas in 1921, he was promoted to lieutenant and assigned to the 4th Infantry Regiment. In July 1925, he graduated from the Higher Officers' Courses. In 1926–1931, he worked at the War School. He held various roles at the school, including instructor on discipline and shooting. He was promoted to major in 1927 and to captain in 1931.

After graduating from the courses for officers of the General Staff in 1934, he was assigned to the staff of the 3rd Infantry Division and became its acting chief of staff in August 1937. He was promoted to colonel in September 1938 and confirmed as chief of staff of the 3rd Infantry Division in November 1938.

=== In the Red Army ===
When Lithuania was occupied by the Soviet Union in June 1940, the Lithuanian Army was gradually reorganized into units of the Red Army. Urbšas briefly became commander of the 7th Infantry Regiment before reassignment as commander of the Soviet 297th Rifle Regiment (part of the 29th Rifle Corps). In May–June 1941, he was chief of staff of the 179th Rifle Division.

On 6 June 1941, just before the German invasion of the Soviet Union, Urbšas was sent to study at the Frunze Military Academy in Moscow and later Ufa. From December 1941 to February 1942, he lectured at the Vystrel course in Kyshtym. He was then assigned to the newly formed 16th "Lithuanian" Rifle Division as commander of the 167th Rifle Regiment but returned to teaching the Vystrel courses in May 1942.

==== 16th Rifle Division ====
The 16th Rifle Division was deployed in February 1943 at Alekseyevka, 50 km (31 mi) southeast of Oryol. It suffered significant losses and within the first month lost 1,169 dead and 3,275 injured out of total strength of 10,000. In April 1943, Urbšas was once again assigned to the 16th Rifle Division – this time as its chief of staff. After recovering and receiving reinforcements, the 16th Rifle Division (as part of the 48th Army) participated in the Battle of Kursk in July–August 1943. It once again suffered significant losses, at least 742 dead and 2,414 injured out of total strength of 7,500.

In September 1943, the 16th Rifle Division was redeployed to the 1st Baltic Front which was closest to Lithuania. In October and November, the division unsuccessfully attacked German positions at Jeziaryšča (Haradok District), Blinky and Borok (Nevelsky District, Pskov Oblast) suffering 2,390 casualties (dead and injured). To present further losses, the division was assigned to the reserves of the 4th Shock Army.

In July 1944, the 16th Rifle Division entered the territory of Lithuania. It did not participate in battles with the Germans and by early August gathered in Šiauliai. The division received reinforcements of conscripted Lithuanians and successfully withstood the German Šiauliai offensive. On 8 September 1944, Urbšas was given the command of the 16th Rifle Division. He was promoted to major general in November. Under his command, the division participated in the Soviet advance towards Klaipėda. During these fights, about 1,350 men of the division were killed. In mid-November 1944, the division was assigned to the Courland Pocket where it fought until the end of the war. About 3,580 men died in Courland.

In January 1945, the division was briefly deployed in Lithuania where it participated in the final capture of Klaipėda. Soviet propaganda touted that the "Lithuanian" division was the first to enter the city. The division received an honorary name after Klaipėda. Urbšas was named the first honorary citizen of Klaipėda and awarded symbolic keys to the city.

Just as Germany was surrendering, Urbšas was removed from his command of the 16th Rifle division on 8 May 1945.

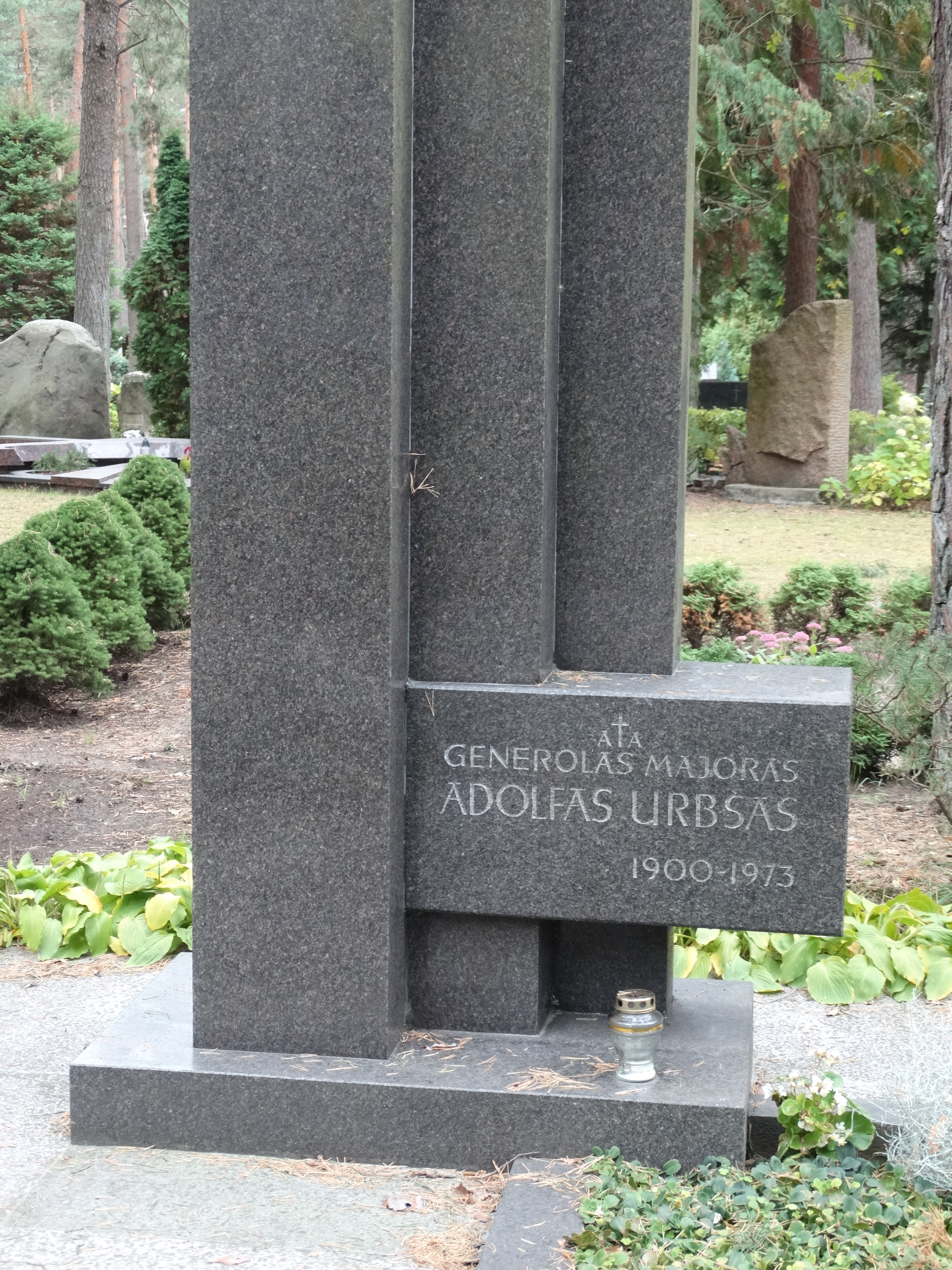
Grave of Urbšas

=== Post-war and retirement ===
In January 1946, Urbšas was returned to teach tactics at the Vystrel course. In 1955, he retired from the military and returned to Lithuania. He worked as director of the military section of the Lithuanian Veterinary Academy until 1961. He was deputy director of the Kaunas History Museum in 1963–1965.

Urbšas died on 19 May 1973 in Kaunas and was buried at the Petrašiūnai Cemetery.

== Awards ==
Urbšas's awards included:

- Order of Vytautas the Great (1930; 5th degree)
- Order of the Lithuanian Grand Duke Gediminas (1937; 3rd degree)
- Independence Medal (Lithuania)
- Order of the Red Star (15 July 1943)
- Order of the Patriotic War (29 July 1944; 1st degree)
- Order of the Red Banner (26 October 1944)
