= 16th Rifle Division =

16th Rifle Division (May 1918–July 1941) 16th 'Lithuanian' Rifle Division (Dec 1941–1947; Dec 1950–Jul 1956) 44th Rifle Brigade (1947 – Dec 1950)
- Active: 1918–1941 (1st formation); 1941–1956 (2nd formation)
- Country: Soviet Union
- Branch: Red Army
- Type: Infantry
- Size: Division; 10,250
- Nicknames: 'Jewish' 'Lithuanian' 'The division with the sixteen Lithuanians'
- Engagements: World War II; Eastern Front; Battle of Kursk; Operation Bagration; Baltic Offensive
- Decorations: Order of the Red Banner (2nd formation)

Commanders
- Notable commanders: Valerian A. Frolov (1937–1939); Feliksas Baltušis-Žemaitis (1943); Adolfas Urbšas (1945)

The 16th Rifle Division (Russian: 16-я стрелковая Литовская Клайпедская Краснознамённая дивизия, romanized: 16-ya strelkovaya Litovskaya Klaypedskaya Krasnoznamonnaya diviziya; Hebrew: דיוויזיית הרובאים הליטאית ה-16; Lithuanian: 16-oji 'Lietuviškoji' divizija) was a formation in the Red Army created during World War II. The division was formed twice, and was given the title 'Lithuanian' during its second formation.

It was originally established at Tambov in May 1918. It was wiped out at Mga in July 1941. Reformed and given the title 'Lithuanian', the division participated in several battles against Nazi Germany, including Kursk, Belarus, and the Baltic. In the immediate post-war, the division became a brigade but re-became a division in 1950. It was disbanded in 1956.

== First formation ==
The division was originally formed in 1918.

=== Operation Barbarossa ===
At the beginning of Operation Barbarossa the 16th Rifle Division (1st formation) was part of Northwestern Front's 27th Army, reporting directly to Army headquarters along with the 67th Rifle Division and 3rd Rifle Brigade. It was destroyed at Mga amid the first German drive on Leningrad.

== Second formation ==
=== Background ===
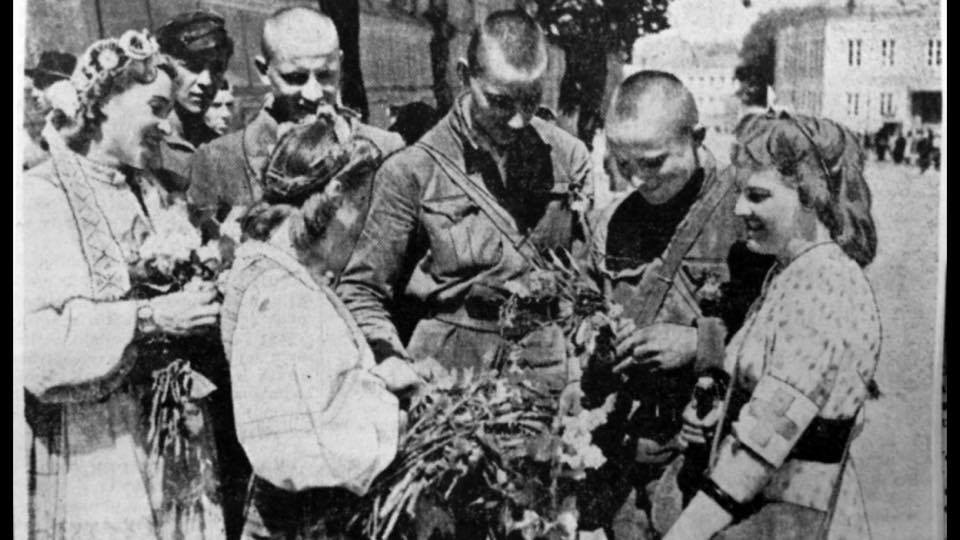
Soldiers of the former Lithuanian Army, liberated from the Lithuanian Rifle Corps of the Red Army, warmly greeted in Vilnius during the June Uprising, 1941

When the 16th Division was reformed after its destruction, it was named 'Lithuanian' for political purposes.

After Lithuania, along with Latvia and Estonia, were occupied by the Soviet Union in June 1940, the Lithuanian Army was reorganized into the Lithuanian People's Army and soon the Red Army's 29th Rifle Corps. At the start of Operation Barbarossa in June 1941, Lithuanians massively deserted, killed non-Lithuanian commanders and joined the anti-Soviet June Uprising. Out of the 16,000 soldiers of the 29th Rifle Corps, only 2,000 retreated with the Red Army. The Corps' remnants retreated to Velikiye Luki by mid-July. The corps was officially disbanded on 23 September 1941.

Despite this disaster, Lithuanian communists, including Antanas Sniečkus and Mečislovas Gedvilas, sought to establish a new Lithuanian unit. Similar national military units formed from the ethnicities of the other Baltic republics were the 8th Estonian Rifle Corps and the 130th Latvian Rifle Corps. In mid-1943, compared to the 7th and 149th Estonian (81% and 63% Estonian respectively) and 43rd Latvian Guards (38.8% Latvian) Rifle Divisions, the 'Lithuanian' division had the lowest percentage (36.5%) of the titular Baltic ethnicity. The purpose of the divisions was not only military but also political as their members were important for the planned post-war Sovietization of the occupied Baltic states.

=== Formation ===
The 16th Lithuanian Rifle Division was created on 18 December 1941. The decision to form it was made by the State Defense Committee, following requests by the Central Committee of the Communist Party of Lithuania and the LSSR's government. It was decided that it would be formed in the Moscow Military District, in Balakhna, Gorky Oblast. Personnel came from remnants of the 184th Rifle Division (former 29th Rifle Corps), the Lithuanians that were longtime inhabitants of Russia and any Lithuanian-speaking refugees that had fled Lithuania after the German invasion. However, out of 23,000 refugees from Lithuania, 15,000 of them were Jewish. Lithuanians born in Russia and Lithuanian-born Russians were drafted into the division, because there was insufficient numbers of Lithuanians to form a division. The officers were recruited from among the Vilnius Infantry Academy's graduates, who the Soviet government immediately evacuated following the beginning of the German invasion to Novokuznetsk, Kemerovo Oblast.

Throughout 1942, the division was being formed and trained, still located in the Moscow Military District. In December 1942, the division was made part of the Bryansk Front. Thereafter, it was part of the Central Front.

=== 1943 ===
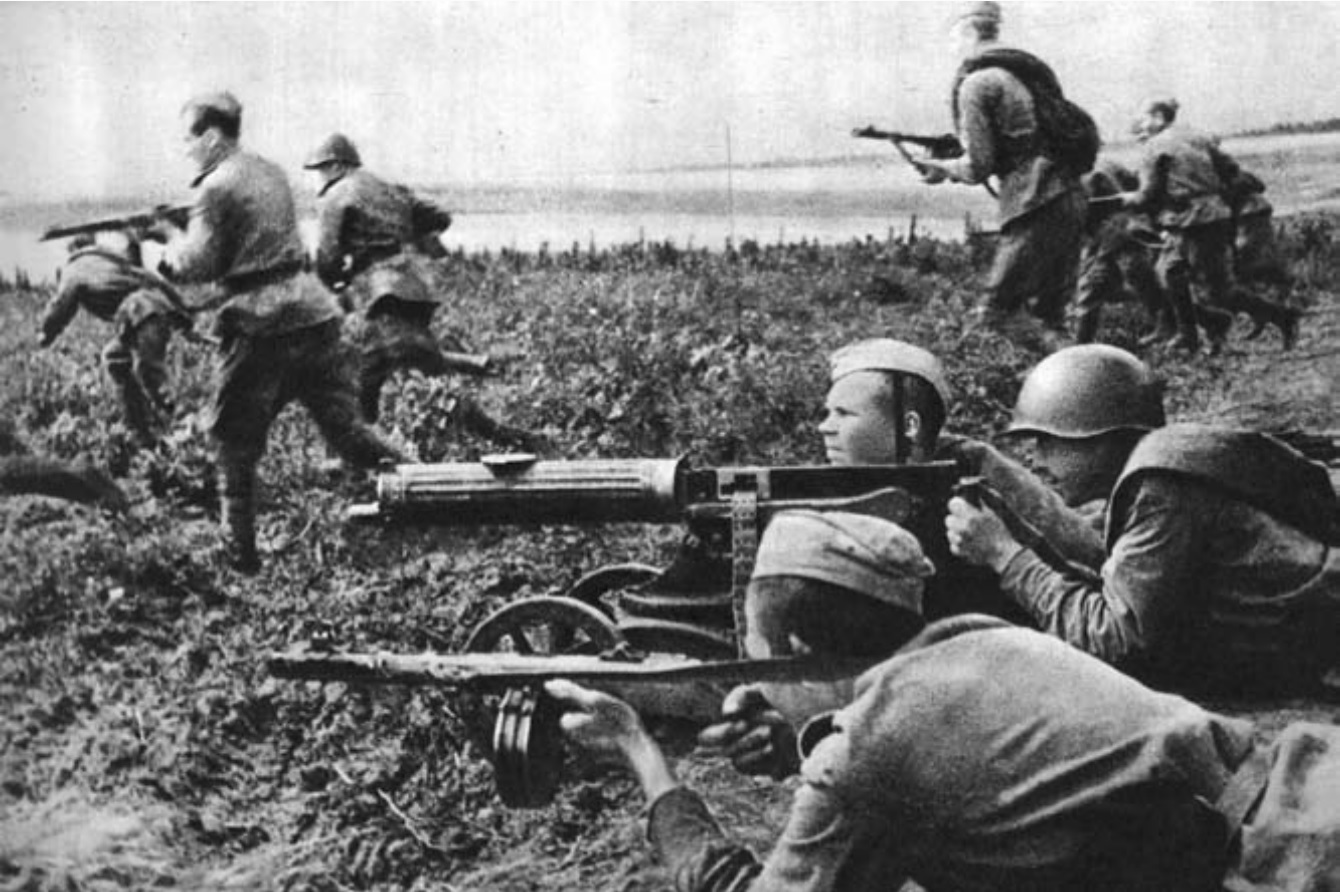
Soldiers of the 16th Rifle Division participating in fighting in the Oryol Oblast in the summer of 1943

Formation and training of the division came to an end by February 1943 and the division entered the war on 21 February 1943 at Alekseyevka, 50 km southeast of Oryol. This brought the division into the path of the Wehrmacht's Operation Citadel. The division fought in the Battle of Kursk, where it served with the 42nd Rifle Corps of the 48th Army, Soviet Central Front.

In the first days of the battle, the 16th Rifle Division withstood the attack of the German 383rd Infantry and 18th Panzer Divisions, that were accompanied by 120 planes. After suffering serious losses, the Soviet armies eventually emerged victorious. Between 20 February and 24 March 1943, the division lost 1,169 dead and 3,275 injured men. During this battle a private named Viktor Yatsenevich, was wounded, taken prisoner and then allegedly tortured to death by the Germans, for which, a year later, he was posthumously awarded the title Hero of the Soviet Union.

After Oryol was captured as part of Operation Kutuzov, the division was removed from the Central Front in August–September 1943. On September 28, the division was once more part of the army and was made part of the Kalinin Front's 4th Shock Army, which soon became the 1st Baltic Front.

=== 1944 ===
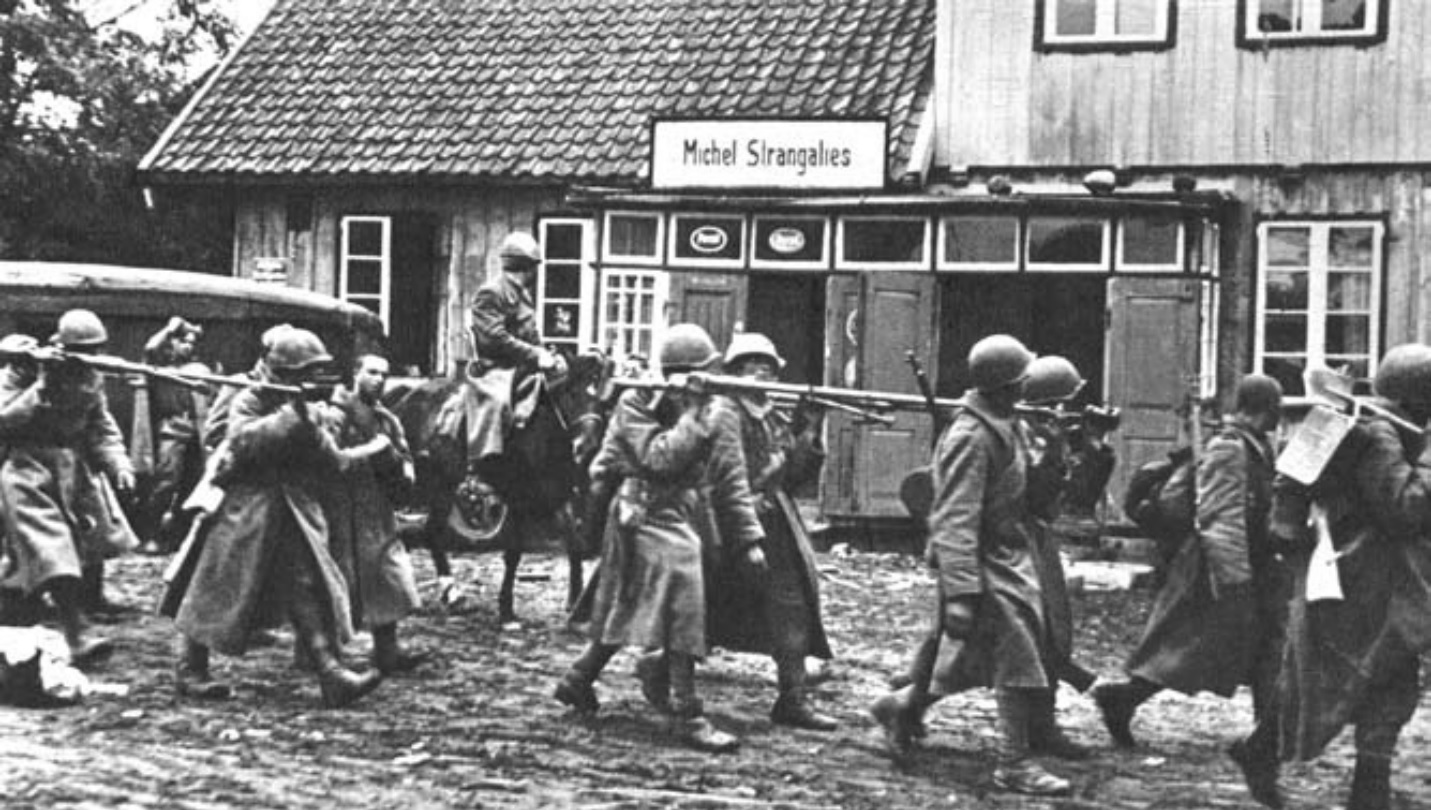
Soldiers of the 16th Rifle Division marching through the village of Stoniškiai in October 1944

During Operation Bagration, the division was placed in the reserves. Along with the 3rd Belorussian Front, the 1st Baltic Front invaded Belarus and much of Lithuania. Later in June, the division was made part of the 4th Shock Army, but it was not deployed to heavy combat due to the division's political importance. However, in July, the division was assigned as part of the second Soviet occupation of the Baltic states. On 2 August 1944, division had arrived at Šiauliai's suburbs, which was home to their commander, Vladas Karvelis. The division was stationed there for one month, and reinforced with Lithuanian forced conscripts.

In mid-August the city of Šiauliai was hit by the German Šiauliai offensive. The Wehrmacht divisions were armed with 900 armoured vehicles and artillery pieces. For three days the 16th Division stood its ground, and in the end as the German attack ran out of steam the Division emerged victorious. On 31 October the division was awarded the Order of the Red Banner for "courage and valor" in breaking through German defenses west of Šiauliai.

As the Red Army occupied Lithuania a second time, conscription into the Red Army began on Lithuanian territory in August 1944. In total, 108,378 Lithuanians were conscripted in August 1944–April 1945. Thus, the number of Lithuanians in the 16th Lithuanian Rifle Division increased from 32.2% on 1 July 1944 to 68.4% on 27 April 1945. A part of the conscripted Lithuanians were made into the 50th Lithuanian Reserve Rifle Division.

=== 1945 ===
On 31 January 1945, the Lithuanian division received orders to join the fight against the Germans in the Courland Pocket. The German resistance was strong and elements of Army Group Courland did not surrender to the Soviets until 8–9 May at the end of World War II in Europe.

The division was part of 22nd Guards Rifle Corps, 6th Guards Army towards the end of the war on 1 May 1945.

After the war, many former soldiers of the division's went to Palestine.

=== Structure (World War II) ===
- 156th Rifle Regiment (commander Colonel V. Lunia)
- 167th Rifle Regiment (commander Colonel Vladas Motieka)
- 249th Rifle Regiment (commander Lieutenant Colonel F. Lysenko)
- 224th Artillery Regiment (commander Major Povilas Simonaitis)
- Signal Battalion
- Field Engineer Battalion (commander Major Petras Ciunis)
- Anti-tank Battalion
- Mortar Battalion

=== Ethnic composition ===
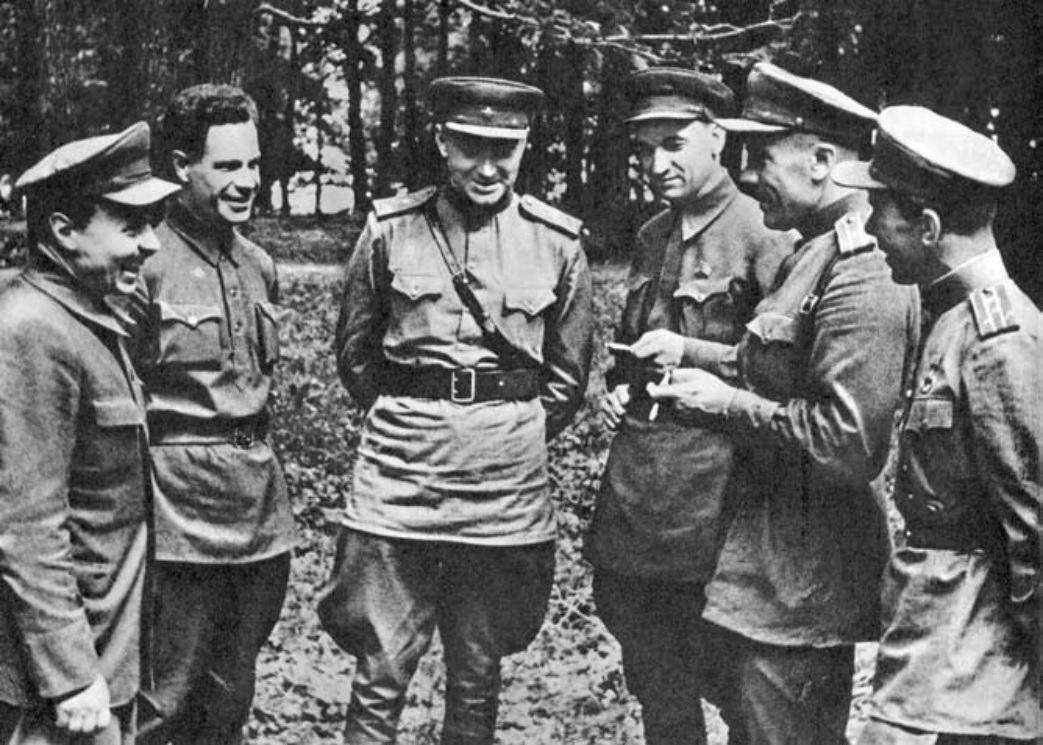
Lithuanian SSR leadership in the 16th 'Lithuanian' Rifle Division, including Antanas Sniečkus, Vladas Karvelis, Justas Paleckis, June 1943

Various sources estimate that 50%, up to 80% or even 85% of the division was Jewish. Initially, about 45% to 50% of the division was Jewish, with the Jews making up the absolute majority in the infantry regiments. Thus, the division was nicknamed "The division with the sixteen Lithuanians" or the "Jewish Division". A veteran of the division claimed that there was a policy of sending Jews to fight, keeping Lithuanians behind the front as the Soviet military wanted to preserve the Lithuanian character of the division. The Jewish author Miriam Weinstein wrote that 90% of the division's casualties were Jews. By the time the division reached Lithuania, the division was only about 20% Jewish.

As of 1 January 1943, of the 10,250 soldiers and officers of the division, 7,000 of them were ethnic Lithuanians and/or inhabitants of the Lithuanian SSR (which included people that were not of the Lithuanian ethnicity). The total ethnic make-up of the division was:

- 3,720 Lithuanians (36.3%),
- 3,064 Russians (29%),
- 2,973 Jews (29%),
- 492 of other ethnicities (4.8%).

Although other sources cite figures of 2,378 Jews (23.2%) in the division, it is still the highest number of ethnic Jews amongst all divisions of the Red Army. Jews made 13% (136 persons) of all officers in the division and 34.2% of all soldiers in the infantry regiments. 12 soldiers of a division have been awarded the title, Hero of the Soviet Union, of them, four were Jews:

- Major Volf Vilensky (Volfas Vilenskis)
- sergeant Kalman Shur (Kalmanis Shuras)
- corporal Grigorijus Ušpolis (Grigory Ushpolis)
- and private Borisas Cindelis (Boris Tsindelis, posthumously).

The division's official language, commands and orders were in Russian. Yiddish was sometimes used in drill commands and less formal orders.

=== Cold War ===
Following World War II, the division was made part of the Steppe Military District's 92nd Rifle Corps. In 1947, it became the 44th Rifle Brigade at Vilnius, now with the 2nd Guards Rifle Corps. In December 1950, it became a division again. It was disbanded on 7 July 1956.

=== Commanders ===
No.	Portrait	Commander	Took office	Left office	Time in office
1	Feliksas Baltušis-Žemaitis	Major general Feliksas Baltušis-Žemaitis (1897–1957)	3 April 1942	17 August 1943	1 year, 136 days
2	Vladas Karvelis	Major general Vladas Karvelis (1901–1980)	18 April 1943	7 September 1944	1 year, 142 days
3	Adolfas Urbšas	Major general Adolfas Urbšas (1900–1973)	8 September 1944	11 May 1945	245 days

== See also ==
- List of Soviet divisions 1917–1945
- Liudas Gira - Lithuanian poet that served in the division from 1942 to 1944.
