= List of ministers of the Lithuanian Soviet Socialist Republic =

The Council of Ministers of the Lithuanian SSR (Lithuanian: Lietuvos TSR Ministrų Taryba) was the cabinet (executive branch) of the Lithuanian SSR, one of the republics of the Soviet Union, from March 25, 1946, to March 11, 1990. Its structure and functions were modeled after the Council of Ministers of the Soviet Union. The list below includes government members through June 1987.

== Member list ==
Name	Ministry/Title	From	To	Tenure
Albinas Adomaitis	Light Industry	October 21, 1965	February 6, 1975	9 years, 108 days
Vladimiras Aleknavičius	Technical Crops	March 25, 1946	March 8, 1947	348 days
Kazys Andrijaitis	Food Industry	March 25, 1946	April 23, 1953	7 years, 29 days
Vladas Augustinaitis	Agriculture	July 29, 1950	April 23, 1953	2 years, 268 days
Vladas Augustinaitis	Agriculture	January 4, 1954	April 19, 1956	2 years, 106 days
Vladas Augustinaitis	Agriculture and Resources	April 23, 1953	January 4, 1954	256 days
Vladas Augustinaitis	Husbandry	April 24, 1946	March 8, 1947	318 days
Vladas Augustinaitis	Soviet Farms	March 13, 1947	July 29, 1950	3 years, 138 days
Vladas Augustinaitis	Soviet Farms	April 19, 1956	June 1, 1957	1 year, 43 days
Vladas Augustinaitis	Trade	March 25, 1946	April 24, 1946	30 days
Anicetas Bagdonas	Rural Construction	September 30, 1967	December 16, 1985	18 years, 77 days
Juozas Banaitis	Culture	January 11, 1958	March 27, 1967	9 years, 75 days
Stanislovas Banaitis	Health	March 25, 1946	March 13, 1947	353 days
Albertas Barauskas	Deputy Chairman	December 26, 1962	December 25, 1965	2 years, 364 days
Juozas Bartašiūnas	Internal Affairs	March 25, 1946	April 23, 1953	7 years, 29 days
Nikolajus Belianinas	Communications	February 9, 1955	October 31, 1968	13 years, 265 days
Juozas Bernatavičius	First Deputy Chairman	September 5, 1984	?	?
Juozas Bernatavičius	Deputy Chairman	November 24, 1980	September 5, 1984	3 years, 286 days
Adomas Bialopetravičius	Construction	October 10, 1958	January 29, 1962	3 years, 111 days
Adomas Bialopetravičius	Rural Construction	November 19, 1965	September 30, 1967	1 year, 315 days
Jonas Bielinis	Culture	January 23, 1976	?	?
Elijas Bilevičius	Fish Industry	July 14, 1951	April 23, 1953	1 year, 283 days
Elijas Bilevičius	Food Product Industry	November 17, 1953	June 5, 1957	3 years, 200 days
Elijas Bilevičius	Sovnarkhoz Deputy Chairman	February 10, 1958	August 18, 1961	3 years, 189 days
Jurgis Blieka	Justice	March 13, 1947	October 11, 1951	4 years, 212 days
Vaclovas Boreika	Deputy Chairman	March 13, 1947	September 16, 1949	2 years, 187 days
Vaclovas Boreika	Local and Fuel Industry	December 12, 1953	February 9, 1957	3 years, 59 days
Vaclovas Boreika	Local Industry	August 10, 1951	December 12, 1953	2 years, 124 days
Stasys Brašiškis	Deputy Chairman	March 25, 1946	December 4, 1946	254 days
Stasys Brašiškis	Cinematography	December 4, 1946	May 10, 1948	1 year, 158 days
Algirdas Brazauskas	Construction Material Industry	October 21, 1965	December 22, 1966	1 year, 62 days
Marijonas Buklys	Meat and Dairy Industry	October 21, 1965	December 16, 1985	20 years, 56 days
Ivanas Černikovas	Motor Transport and Highway	August 11, 1976	?	?
Aleksandras Cesnavičius	Deputy Chairman	July 7, 1976	?	?
Aleksejus Čistiakovas	Deputy Chairman	July 13, 1950	August 23, 1958	8 years, 41 days
Aleksejus Čistiakovas	Sovnarkhoz Deputy Chairman	August 23, 1958	October 24, 1963	5 years, 62 days
Jonas Cygas	Meat and Dairy Industry	March 25, 1946	November 24, 1947	1 year, 244 days
Rimantas Dabkevičius	Grain Products	December 16, 1985	?	?
Rimantas Dabkevičius	Resources (Paruošų)	December 25, 1984	December 16, 1985	356 days
Algirdas Didžiulis	Sovnarkhoz First Deputy Chairman	September 15, 1961	April 19, 1963	1 year, 216 days
Alfonsas Dirsė	Health	June 8, 1957	February 24, 1960	2 years, 261 days
Leokadija Diržinskaitė-Piliušenko	Deputy Chairman	January 28, 1960	June 10, 1976	16 years, 134 days
Leokadija Diržinskaitė-Piliušenko	Foreign Affairs	February 23, 1966	June 10, 1976	10 years, 108 days
Kęstutis Domaševičius	Justice	March 25, 1946	March 13, 1947	353 days
Aleksandras Drobnys	Deputy Chairman	August 22, 1957	September 13, 1958	1 year, 22 days
Aleksandras Drobnys	Deputy Chairman	December 25, 1965	December 25, 1984	19 years, 0 days
Aleksandras Drobnys	Finance	March 25, 1946	August 22, 1957	11 years, 150 days
Stanislovas Dulskas	Food Industry	October 28, 1970	December 16, 1985	15 years, 49 days
Vytautas Einoris	Fruit and Vegetable Production	January 6, 1981	December 16, 1985	4 years, 344 days
Stasys Filipavičius	Consumer Industrial Goods	October 29, 1953	November 4, 1955	2 years, 6 days
Stasys Filipavičius	Light and Food Industry	April 23, 1953	October 29, 1953	189 days
Stasys Filipavičius	Light Industry	November 4, 1955	June 5, 1957	1 year, 213 days
Alfonsas Gailevičius	Internal Affairs	May 6, 1954	September 18, 1962	8 years, 135 days
Alfonsas Gailevičius	Security of Public Order	September 18, 1962	September 19, 1968	6 years, 1 day
Ignas Gaška	Foreign Affairs	January 27, 1949	April 23, 1959	10 years, 86 days
Mečislovas Gedvilas	Chairman	March 25, 1946	January 16, 1956	9 years, 297 days
Mečislovas Gedvilas	Education	July 15, 1957	June 29, 1973	15 years, 349 days
Nikolajus Gorlinskis	State Security	February 25, 1949	April 27, 1949	61 days
Marijonas Gregorauskas	Deputy Chairman	March 25, 1946	July 31, 1946	128 days
Juozas Grigalavičius	Deputy Chairman	September 20, 1956	August 23, 1958	1 year, 337 days
Medardas Grigaliūnas	First Deputy Chairman	February 23, 1963	April 7, 1965	2 years, 43 days
Medardas Grigaliūnas	Agriculture	April 7, 1965	December 16, 1985	20 years, 253 days
Medardas Grigaliūnas	Production of Agricultural Products and Resources	February 23, 1963	April 7, 1965	2 years, 43 days
Viačeslavas Grincevičius	Construction	September 26, 1957	October 10, 1958	1 year, 14 days
Aleksandras Gudaitis-Guzevičius	Culture	April 23, 1953	March 18, 1955	1 year, 329 days
Adolfas Ivaškevičius	Trade	April 24, 1946	July 12, 1950	4 years, 79 days
Nikolajus Izvekovas	Sovnarkhoz First Deputy Chairman	May 25, 1963	October 24, 1963	152 days
Tatjana Jančaitytė	Social Welfare	February 1, 1960	December 14, 1973	13 years, 316 days
Stanislovas Jankevičius	Motor Transport and Highway	November 24, 1953	September 20, 1955	1 year, 300 days
Stanislovas Jankevičius	Road and Transport	October 22, 1953	November 24, 1953	33 days
Stanislovas Jasiūnas	Construction Material Industry	December 22, 1966	?	?
Dmitrijus Jefimovas	State Security	March 25, 1946	February 25, 1949	2 years, 337 days
Aleksandras Jefremovas	State Control	April 3, 1948	February 20, 1958	9 years, 323 days
Romualdas Jurevičius	Food Industry	October 21, 1965	June 10, 1970	4 years, 232 days
Romualdas Jurevičius	Sovnarkhoz Deputy Chairman	January 20, 1962	May 24, 1962	124 days
Ksaveras Kairys	First Deputy Chairman	January 13, 1961	April 5, 1962	1 year, 82 days
Ksaveras Kairys	First Deputy Chairman	April 30, 1965	December 9, 1983	18 years, 223 days
Ksaveras Kairys	Deputy Chairman	July 29, 1950	March 24, 1953	2 years, 238 days
Ksaveras Kairys	Deputy Chairman	April 5, 1962	April 30, 1965	3 years, 25 days
Ksaveras Kairys	Meat and Dairy Industry	November 24, 1947	July 29, 1950	2 years, 247 days
Ksaveras Kairys	Meat and Dairy Industry	April 27, 1951	April 23, 1953	1 year, 361 days
Ksaveras Kairys	Meat and Dairy Product Industry	May 26, 1954	June 5, 1957	3 years, 10 days
Ksaveras Kairys	Sovnarkhoz Chairman	July 19, 1958	January 13, 1961	2 years, 178 days
Ksaveras Kairys	Sovnarkhoz First Deputy Chairman	February 10, 1958	July 19, 1958	159 days
Nikolajus Kaluginas	Local Industry	March 4, 1949	August 10, 1951	2 years, 159 days
Petras Kapralovas	State Security	August 13, 1949	April 23, 1953	3 years, 253 days
Liudas Kareckas	Resources (Paruošų)	December 8, 1969	December 25, 1984	15 years, 17 days
Eduardas Karlo	Public Utilities	April 28, 1966	July 15, 1971	5 years, 78 days
Vilius Kazanavičius	Deputy Chairman	February 19, 1980	?	?
Vytautas Kleiza	Health	June 28, 1960	November 24, 1980	20 years, 149 days
Albertas Knyva	Education	June 28, 1949	October 6, 1953	4 years, 100 days
Petras Kondakovas	Internal Affairs	April 23, 1953	June 10, 1953	48 days
Vasilijus Kotovas	Construction	August 14, 1948	May 25, 1950	1 year, 284 days
Povilas Kulvietis	Deputy Chairman	October 25, 1965	April 23, 1975	9 years, 180 days
Povilas Kulvietis	Sovnarkhoz Chairman	January 13, 1961	October 21, 1965	4 years, 281 days
Povilas Kulvietis	Sovnarkhoz Deputy Chairman	February 10, 1958	January 13, 1961	2 years, 338 days
Petras Kunčinas	Soviet Farms	February 5, 1954	April 19, 1956	2 years, 74 days
Vytautas Kupčiūnas	Sovnarkhoz Deputy Chairman	April 6, 1961	October 24, 1963	2 years, 201 days
Pranas Kūris	Justice	September 28, 1977	?	?
Povilas Kurys	Forest Industry	April 6, 1951	April 23, 1953	2 years, 17 days
Povilas Kurys	Forest Industry	May 26, 1954	June 5, 1957	3 years, 10 days
Povilas Kurys	Cellulose, Paper and Wood Processing Industry	October 21, 1965	September 12, 1968	2 years, 327 days
Povilas Kurys	Forest and Paper Industry	March 4, 1949	April 6, 1951	2 years, 33 days
Povilas Kurys	Forest and Paper Industry	April 23, 1953	May 26, 1954	1 year, 33 days
Povilas Kurys	Furniture and Wood Processing Industry	October 23, 1968	November 24, 1980	12 years, 32 days
Povilas Kurys	Local Industry	March 13, 1947	March 4, 1949	1 year, 356 days
Georgijus Kuskovas	Local Industry	May 30, 1973	April 2, 1975	1 year, 307 days
Vytautas Kuzma	Communications	April 24, 1986	?	?
Jonas Laurinaitis	Deputy Chairman	May 6, 1954	May 29, 1961	7 years, 23 days
Petras Levickis	First Deputy Chairman	January 23, 1956	October 7, 1958	2 years, 257 days
Kazimieras Liaudis	Deputy Chairman	March 13, 1947	July 17, 1950	3 years, 126 days
Kazimieras Liaudis	Agriculture	March 13, 1947	July 17, 1950	3 years, 126 days
Kazimieras Liaudis	Internal Affairs	October 22, 1953	April 5, 1954	165 days
Stasys Lisauskas	Internal Affairs	June 11, 1984	?	?
Nikolajus Liubimcevas	Construction Material Industry	August 1, 1946	October 6, 1953	7 years, 66 days
Vytaūias Lukaševičius	Forestry and Timber Industry	August 25, 1978	?	?
Leonas Mackevičius	Local and Fuel Industry	February 28, 1957	June 5, 1957	97 days
Leonas Mackevičius	Sovnarkhoz Deputy Chairman	February 10, 1958	April 4, 1959	1 year, 53 days
Dmitrijus Mamajevas	Deputy Chairman	March 25, 1946	March 13, 1947	353 days
Dmitrijus Mamajevas	Soviet Farms	July 29, 1950	April 23, 1953	2 years, 268 days
Juozas Maniušis	Chairman	April 14, 1967	January 16, 1981	13 years, 277 days
Juozas Maniušis	Construction	May 25, 1950	September 30, 1954	4 years, 128 days
Juozas Maniušis	Urban and Rural Construction	September 30, 1954	October 19, 1955	1 year, 19 days
Vladislovas Martinaitis	Motor Transport and Highway	September 20, 1955	August 11, 1976	20 years, 326 days
Algirdas Matulionis	Forestry	April 3, 1948	April 23, 1953	5 years, 20 days
Algirdas Matulionis	Forestry and Timber Industry	September 26, 1957	August 25, 1978	20 years, 333 days
Michalina Meškauskienė	Cinematography	May 10, 1948	April 23, 1953	4 years, 348 days
Vaclovas Mickevičius	Fish Industry	February 3, 1949	July 14, 1951	2 years, 161 days
Vaclovas Mickevičius	Fish Industry	May 26, 1954	June 5, 1957	3 years, 10 days
Pranas Mickūnas	Trade	May 12, 1975	?	?
Julijonas Mikalauskas	Internal Affairs	December 3, 1968	June 11, 1984	15 years, 191 days
Julijonas Mikalauskas	Security of Public Order	September 19, 1968	December 3, 1968	75 days
Anatolijus Mikutis	Trade	November 4, 1950	May 12, 1975	24 years, 189 days
Kazimieras Miniotas	Furniture and Paper Industry	April 10, 1986	?	?
Kazimieras Miniotas	Furniture and Wood Processing Industry	November 24, 1980	April 10, 1986	5 years, 137 days
Georgijus Molotokas	Construction Material Industry	February 2, 1954	June 5, 1957	3 years, 123 days
Vladas Niunka	Deputy Chairman	March 25, 1946	December 1, 1948	2 years, 251 days
Vladas Niunka	Education	April 26, 1948	December 1, 1948	219 days
Vincentas Normantas	Land Reclamation and Water Resources	December 25, 1984	?	?
Pranas Olekas	Deputy Chairman	March 13, 1947	July 17, 1950	3 years, 126 days
Kostas Onaitis	Communications	December 30, 1968	March 31, 1986	17 years, 91 days
Eduardas Ozarskis	First Deputy Chairman	March 18, 1955	January 13, 1961	5 years, 301 days
Eduardas Ozarskis	Deputy Chairman	January 29, 1954	March 18, 1955	1 year, 48 days
Eduardas Ozarskis	Local Industry	October 21, 1965	May 30, 1973	7 years, 221 days
Eduardas Ozarskis	Sovnarkhoz Chairman	June 8, 1957	July 19, 1958	1 year, 41 days
Janina Pacevičienė	Social Welfare	December 14, 1973	?	?
Bronislovas Penkauskas	Health	March 13, 1947	May 8, 1957	10 years, 56 days
Vasilijus Pisarevas	First Deputy Chairman	October 28, 1946	August 18, 1953	6 years, 294 days
Jonas Platukis	Health	November 24, 1980	?	?
Kazys Plechavičius	Residential Services	June 22, 1966	?	?
Aleksandras Ponomariovas	Forest Industry	March 25, 1946	August 25, 1948	2 years, 153 days
Aleksandras Ponomariovas	Forest and Paper Industry	August 25, 1948	January 27, 1949	155 days
Kazys Preikšas	Deputy Chairman	December 1, 1948	January 28, 1960	11 years, 58 days
Kazys Preikšas	Foreign Affairs	April 23, 1959	December 5, 1961	2 years, 226 days
Stasys Pupeikis	Education	October 6, 1953	July 15, 1957	3 years, 282 days
Jonas Ramanauskas	Light Industry	February 6, 1975	?	?
Alfonsas Randakevičius	Justice	November 12, 1970	July 13, 1977	6 years, 243 days
Jonas Razumas	Public Utilities	September 12, 1984	?	?
Antanas Rimkus	Education	June 29, 1973	December 20, 1982	9 years, 174 days
Povilas Rotomskis	Foreign Affairs	March 25, 1946	September 21, 1948	2 years, 180 days
Jurijus Rusenka	Deputy Chairman	April 23, 1975	?	?
Vytautas Sakalauskas	Chairman	November 18, 1985		4 years, 113 days
Vytautas Sakalauskas	First Deputy Chairman	December 9, 1983	August 13, 1984	248 days
Romualdas Sakalauskas	Construction	January 29, 1962	June 28, 1978	16 years, 150 days
Lionginas Šepetys	Culture	July 21, 1967	January 23, 1976	8 years, 186 days
Petras Šeremetjevas	Construction	December 20, 1946	February 14, 1948	1 year, 56 days
Juozas Sėrys	First Deputy Chairman	April 3, 1986	?	?
Juozas Šerys	Deputy Chairman	September 5, 1984	April 3, 1986	1 year, 210 days
Juozas Šėrys	Public Utilities	July 15, 1971	September 5, 1984	13 years, 52 days
Bronislovas Sešplaukis	Construction	June 28, 1978	?	?
Romualdas Sikorskis	Finance	August 22, 1957	?	?
Grigorijus Simenenka	Local Industry	April 22, 1975	?	?
Sergejus Škodinas	Local Industry	March 25, 1946	March 13, 1947	353 days
Jonas Smilgevičius	Culture	March 18, 1955	January 11, 1958	2 years, 299 days
Aleksandras Sokolovas	Deputy Chairman	March 25, 1946	May 6, 1954	8 years, 42 days
Ringaudas Songaila	Chairman	January 16, 1981	November 18, 1985	4 years, 306 days
Ringaudas Songaila	First Deputy Chairman	April 5, 1962	February 20, 1963	321 days
Ringaudas Songaila	Deputy Chairman	May 29, 1961	April 5, 1962	311 days
Ringaudas Songaila	Production of Agricultural Products and Resources	April 5, 1962	February 20, 1963	321 days
Valentinas Spurga	Education	February 1, 1983	?	?
Juozas Stimburys	Social Welfare	March 25, 1946	February 1, 1960	13 years, 313 days
Motiejus Šumauskas	Chairman	January 16, 1956	April 14, 1967	11 years, 88 days
Motiejus Šumauskas	First Deputy Chairman	June 10, 1953	March 18, 1955	1 year, 281 days
Motiejus Šumauskas	Deputy Chairman	March 25, 1946	July 14, 1950	4 years, 111 days
Jokūbas Sviščiovas	Public Utilities	March 25, 1946	June 5, 1957	11 years, 72 days
Fiodoras Teriošinas	Light Industry	March 25, 1946	April 23, 1953	7 years, 29 days
Fiodoras Teriošinas	Textile Industry	November 4, 1955	November 26, 1956	1 year, 22 days
Sigizmundas Tverkus	State Control	March 25, 1946	April 3, 1948	2 years, 9 days
Konstantinas Ufimcevas	Urban and Rural Construction	October 29, 1955	June 5, 1957	1 year, 219 days
Albinas Ūkas	Justice	October 11, 1951	July 5, 1959	7 years, 267 days
Jonas Vainauskas	Resources (Paruošų)	April 19, 1961	March 29, 1962	344 days
Vytautas Vazalinskas	Deputy Chairman	July 13, 1965	November 24, 1980	15 years, 134 days
Vytautas Vazalinskas	Soviet Grain and Husbandry Farms	March 25, 1946	June 20, 1946	87 days
Vytautas Vazalinskas	Agriculture	May 10, 1956	March 29, 1962	5 years, 323 days
Jonas Velička	Land Reclamation and Water Resources	October 21, 1965	December 25, 1984	19 years, 65 days
Vladas Vildžiūnas	Agriculture	March 25, 1946	April 24, 1946	30 days
Vladas Vildžiūnas	Agriculture	April 24, 1946	March 8, 1947	318 days
Jonas Vildžiūnas	Internal Affairs	June 10, 1953	October 22, 1953	134 days
Henrikas Zabulis	Higher and Special Education	March 2, 1966	?	?
Andrejus Zasypkinas	Fish Industry	March 25, 1946	February 3, 1949	2 years, 315 days
Vytautas Zenkevičius	Foreign Affairs	December 31, 1976	?	?
Juozas Žiugžda	Education	March 25, 1946	April 26, 1948	2 years, 32 days
