= List of people's commissars of the Lithuanian Soviet Socialist Republic =

The Council of People's Commissars of the Lithuanian SSR (Lithuanian: Lietuvos TSR Liaudies Komisarų Taryba) was the cabinet (executive branch) of the Lithuanian SSR, one of the republics of the Soviet Union, from August 25, 1940 to March 25, 1946. Its structure and functions were modeled after the Soviet Council of People's Commissars. During World War II, from June 1941 to July 1944, the council members were in exile in the Russian SFSR. The council was renamed to the Council of Ministers of the Lithuanian SSR in March 1946.

== Member list ==
Name	People's Commissariat / Title	From	To	Tenure
Liudas Adomauskas	State Control	August 25, 1940	April 22, 1941	240 days
Vladimiras Aleknavičius	Technical Crops	January 9, 1946	March 25, 1946	75 days
Kazimieras Andrijaitis	Food Industry	October 22, 1944	March 25, 1946	1 year, 154 days
Vladas Augustinaitis	Trade	October 6, 1944	March 25, 1946	1 year, 170 days
Juozas Banaitis	Art Council	November 30, 1943	March 25, 1946	2 years, 115 days
Stanislovas Banaitis	Health Care	November 21, 1945	March 25, 1946	124 days
Juozas Bartašiūnas	Internal Affairs	July 10, 1944	March 25, 1946	1 year, 258 days
Elijas Bilevičius	Food Industry	February 14, 1941	January 7, 1944	2 years, 327 days
Stasys Brašiškis	Deputy chairman	August 25, 1940	May 22, 1941	270 days
Stasys Brašiškis	Deputy chairman	October 6, 1944	March 25, 1946	1 year, 170 days
Stasys Brašiškis	Social Welfare	May 22, 1941	October 6, 1944	3 years, 137 days
Jonas Čygas	Meat and Diary	March 15, 1945	March 25, 1946	1 year, 10 days
Kęstutis Domaševičies	Justice	October 6, 1944	March 25, 1946	1 year, 170 days
Aleksandras Drobnys	Finance	January 7, 1944	March 25, 1946	2 years, 77 days
Mečislovas Gedvilas	Chairman	August 25, 1940	March 25, 1946	5 years, 212 days
Vytautas Girdzijauskas	Health Care	August 25, 1940	November 21, 1945	5 years, 88 days
Piotras Gladkovas	State Security (NKGB)	March 8, 1941	July 8, 1944	3 years, 122 days
Pijus Glovackas	Deputy chairman	August 25, 1940	June 24, 1941	303 days
Pijus Glovackas	State Plan Committee	August 25, 1940	June 24, 1941	303 days
Jurgis Glušauskas	Forestry	March 24, 1941	June 22, 1941	90 days
Jurgis Glušauskas	Social Welfare	August 25, 1940	March 24, 1941	211 days
Marijonas Gregorauskas	Deputy chairman	October 6, 1945	March 25, 1946	170 days
Marijonas Gregorauskas	Trade	August 25, 1940	October 6, 1944	4 years, 42 days
Aleksandras Guzevičius	Internal Affairs	August 25, 1940	July 8, 1944	3 years, 318 days
Aleksandras Guzevičius	State Security (NKGB)	July 8, 1944	August 4, 1945	1 year, 27 days
Dmitrijus Jefimovas	State Security (NKGB)	December 15, 1945	March 25, 1946	100 days
Mykolas Junčas-Kučinskas	Labor	August 25, 1940	May 31, 1944	3 years, 280 days
Valerijonas Knyva	Public Utilities (komunalinio ūkio)	August 25, 1940	October 2, 1941	1 year, 38 days
Jonas Laurinaitis	Food Industry	August 25, 1940	February 14, 1941	173 days
Jonas Laurinaitis	Meat and Diary	February 14, 1941	March 15, 1945	4 years, 29 days
Jonas Laurinaitis	Agriculture	March 15, 1945	?	?
Dimitrijus Mamajevas	Deputy chairman	October 27, 1944	March 25, 1946	1 year, 149 days
Michalina Meškauskienė	Art Council	April 14, 1941	November 30, 1943	2 years, 230 days
Matas Mickis	Agriculture	August 25, 1940	January 31, 1941	159 days
Jonas Mikėnas	Deputy chairman	April 3, 1941	September 10, 1945	4 years, 160 days
Bronislovas Morkūnas	Finance	May 22, 1941	January 7, 1944	2 years, 230 days
Vladas Niunka	Deputy chairman	January 5, 1945	March 25, 1946	1 year, 79 days
Povilas Pakarkilis	Justice	August 25, 1940	May 31, 1944	3 years, 280 days
Aleksandras Ponomariovas	Forestry	January 1, 1945	March 25, 1946	1 year, 83 days
Bronius Pušinis	Agriculture	January 31, 1941	?	?
Povilas Rotomskis	Foreign Affairs	December 1, 1944	March 25, 1946	1 year, 114 days
Sergejus Škodinas	Local Industry	August 1, 1945	March 25, 1946	236 days
Aleksandras Sokolovas	Deputy chairman	January 5, 1946	March 25, 1946	79 days
Motiejus Šumauskas	Deputy chairman	May 22, 1941	March 25, 1946	4 years, 307 days
Motiejus Šumauskas	State Plan Committee	September 12, 1945	March 25, 1946	194 days
Motiejus Šumauskas	Local Industry	May 22, 1941	March 25, 1946	4 years, 307 days
Jonas Sviščiovas	Public Utilities (komunalinio ūkio)	September 25, 1945	March 25, 1946	181 days
Fiodoras Teriošinas	Light Industry	May 26, 1945	March 25, 1946	303 days
Fiodoras Teriošinas	Local Industry	October 6, 1944	May 26, 1945	232 days
Zigmas Tverkus	State Control	June 15, 1944	March 25, 1946	1 year, 283 days
Juozas Vaišnoras	Deputy chairman	October 22, 1940	October 30, 1945	5 years, 8 days
Juozas Vaišnoras	State Plan Committee	January 7, 1944	September 12, 1945	1 year, 248 days
Juozas Vaišnoras	Finance	August 25, 1940	May 22, 1941	270 days
Vytautas Vazalinskas	Agriculture	January 7, 1944	?	?
Vytautas Vazalinskas	Grain and Soviet Husbandry Farms	April 22, 1941	January 7, 1944	2 years, 260 days
Vytautas Vazalinskas	Grain and Soviet Husbandry Farms	March 10, 1945	March 25, 1946	1 year, 15 days
Antanas Venclova	Education	August 25, 1940	June 24, 1943	2 years, 303 days
Vladas Vildžiūnas	Agriculture	September 10, 1945	March 25, 1946	196 days
Andrejus Zasypkinas	Fish Industry	August 25, 1940	September 10, 1945	5 years, 16 days
Juozas Žiugžda	Education	June 24, 1943	March 25, 1946	2 years, 274 days
