= Skirgaila (play) =

Lithuanian play

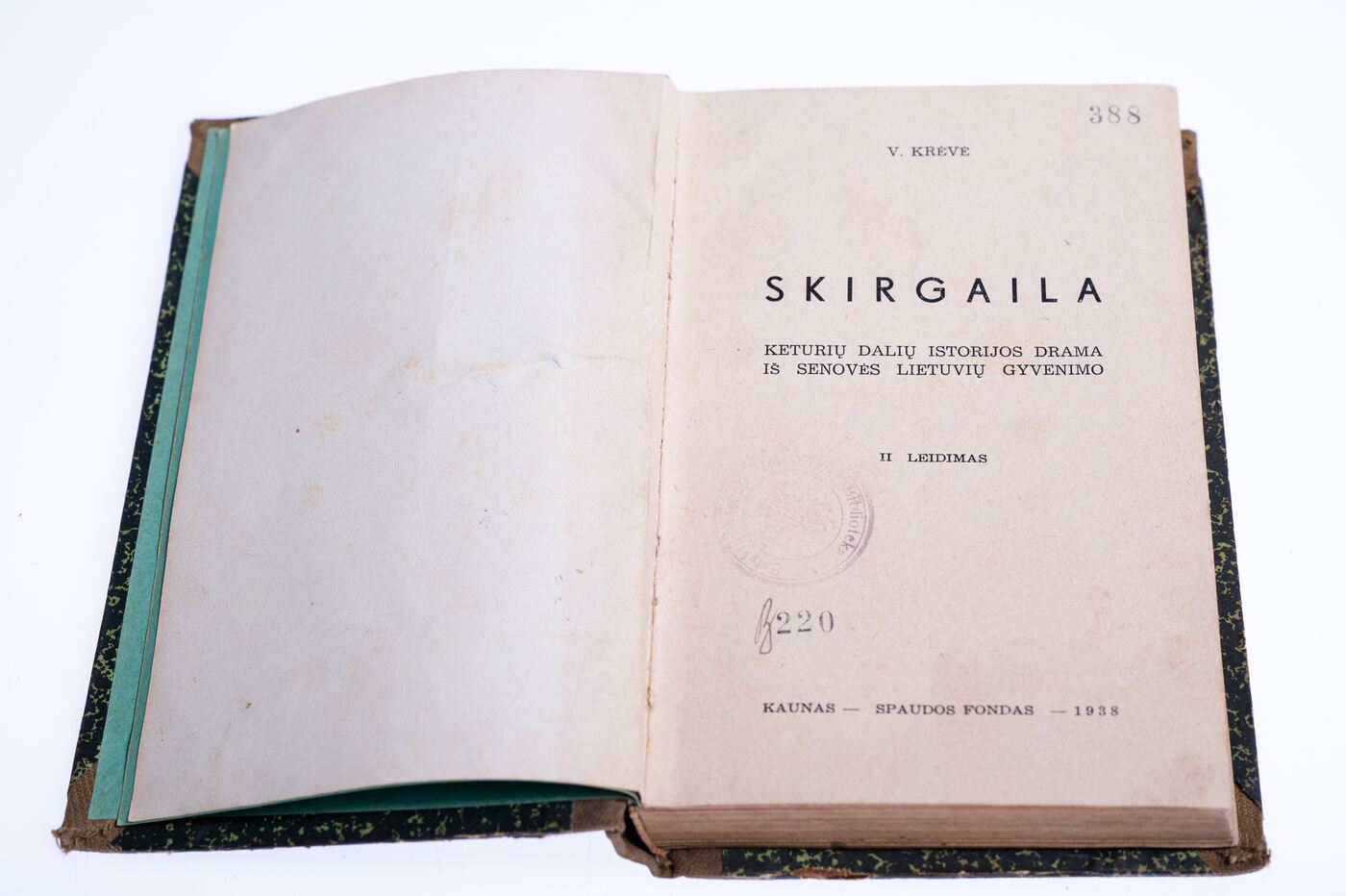
- Skirgaila published in book form, 1938
- Original language: Russian, Lithuanian
- Written by: Vincas Krėvė-Mickevičius
- Subject: Skirgaila, Christianization of Lithuania
- Genre: Historical drama
- Setting: Grand Duchy of Lithuania

Premiere
- Date: 1924

Skirgaila is a four-part play by Vincas Krėvė-Mickevičius. Originally written in Russian during the First World War in 1916, and republished in Lithuanian in 1925, the play is based on the political, cultural, and religious problems of 14th century Lithuania.

It is described as a work heavily influenced by Romantic era values such as love, freedom, respect, and patriotism. Due to its psychological depth and intricate characters, Skirgaila is considered one of the best plays in Lithuania, and one of its first historical dramas along with Šarūnas. Writer Vincas Mykolaitis-Putinas described the play as "<...> the strongest work of drama of Krėvė. It does not have such abundant epics and lyrical ramifications as in Šarūnas. A strong dramatic tension is felt in the work - His style is bright, emotional, and suggestive, and the language is individualized according to the character of the affected persons. Finally, the person of Skirgaila is equal to the meaningful, most tragic characters of European dramaturgy." The main character, Skirgaila, was described as a symbolic person of the era, in whose disappointment the reader feels the tragedy experienced by the whole of pagan Lithuania.

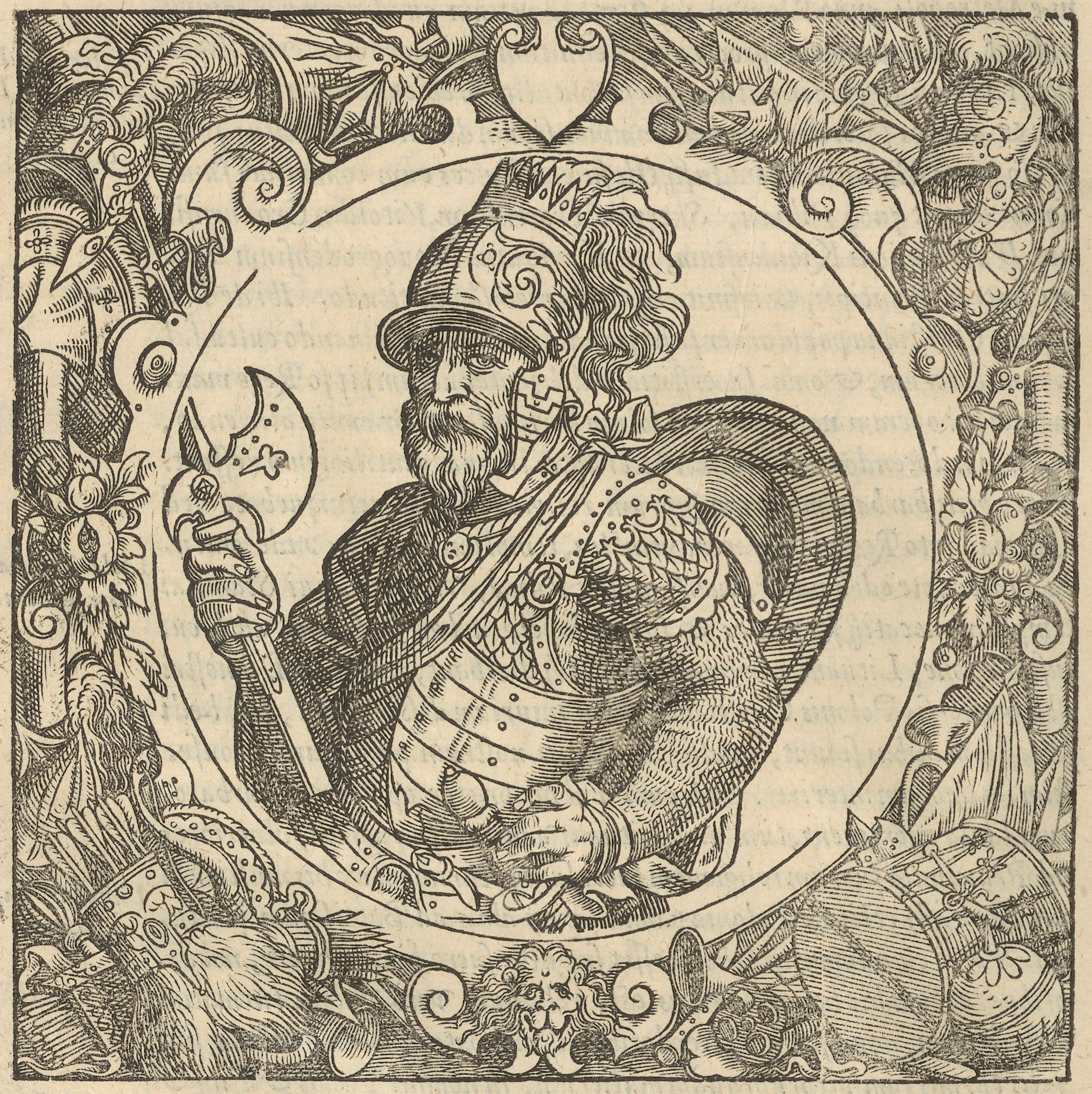
Skirgaila, 16th century imaginative portrait

== History ==
The first draft of Skirgaila was written in 1916 during the First World War, while Vincas Krėvė-Mickevičius was stationed in the Caucasus. It was printed in Russian in 1922. After the play was staged at the Kaunas State Theater by Borisas Dauguvietis in 1924, the play was re-edited and re-published in Lithuanian in 1925. The play was also staged in 1966, 1981, and 1992.

== Plot ==
As regent of the Grand Duchy of Lithuania for his brother Jogaila, Skirgaila is the duke of Lithuania, Trakai, Polotsk, and Kyiv. His reign over Lithuania is marked by conflict with the Kingdom of Poland and the Teutonic Order for land while the question of Christianization constantly lingers as Skirgaila is converted to Christianity but holds himself a pagan. Lithuania's pagan priest, the vaidila Stardas is enthusiastic about going to war with the Teutonic Order to preserve the pagan way of life. He dies in battle and Skirgaila falls into a drunken depression as he loses his source of authority. Meanwhile, Keller, a young German monk-knight, tries to seduce Ona Duonutė, duchess of Lida, who is married to a Mazovian duke. Skirgaila forcefully marries Ona Duonutė to keep the lands of Lida from breaking away. Keller then tries to escape from Ona Duonutė's bedroom, but to not be caught, replaces the body of Stardas with his own. His inner monologue, which is represented by the Light Man and the Dark Man, questions whether to save his life or sacrifice himself for Ona Duonutė. Keller decides to sacrifice himself as Skirgaila buries him alive. Skirgaila, after convincing himself that he is not fit for ruling and that he has not saved pagan traditions, degrades as a character.
