= Council of Ministers of the Lithuanian Soviet Socialist Republic =

The Council of Ministers of the Lithuanian SSR (Lithuanian: Lietuvos TSR Ministrų Taryba) or Council of People's Commissars in 1940–46 (Lithuanian: Lietuvos TSR Liaudies Komisarų Taryba) was the cabinet (executive branch) of the Lithuanian SSR, one of the republics of the Soviet Union. Its structure and functions were modeled after the Council of People's Commissars and Council of Ministers of the Soviet Union. The Council consisted of a chairman, first vice-chairman, vice-chairmen, ministers, and chairmen of state committees. The council's chairman was equivalent to a prime minister and was second in rank after the First Secretary of the Communist Party of Lithuania.

== History and organization ==
After the Soviet occupation of Lithuania in June 1940, Vladimir Dekanozov organized a transitional government, known as the People's Government of Lithuania, and staged elections to the People's Seimas (parliament). During its first session, the parliament proclaimed creation of the Lithuanian Soviet Socialist Republic and petitioned for admission to the Soviet Union. On August 3, 1940, the petition was accepted. A new constitution, copied from the 1936 Soviet Constitution, was adopted on August 25 and the People's Government was replaced by the Council of People's Commissars.

In June 1941, after the German invasion of the Soviet Union, the Council evacuated to interior of Russia and was inactive. It returned in July 1944, after the victory of the Red Army in the Operation Bagration. In March 1946, the Council of People's Commissars was renamed to the Council of Ministers as part of the all-union renaming of the Soviet government. Due to lack of reliable Lithuanian communists, Russian cadres were imported to various positions at the ministries. In 1947, about one-third of the ministers plus a majority of deputy ministers were Russians.

According to the constitution, the Council was appointed by the Supreme Soviet of the Lithuanian SSR during its first post-election session for a four-year (later five-year) term. Formally, the Council was accountable to the Supreme Soviet and its Presidium. In reality, the Supreme Soviet was a rubber stamp institution following orders of the Communist Party of the Soviet Union and Lithuania. While the Council did exercise executive power, it was controlled by and dependent on the Communist Party. For example, when, after Stalin's death, Chairman Mečislovas Gedvilas began acting more independently from First Secretary Antanas Sniečkus, Gedvilas was blamed for problems in agriculture that resulted in food shortages and was demoted to Minister of Education.

While ministries, their names and functions, changed frequently, the ministers tended to have long tenures. For example, Finance Minister Romualdas Sikorskis served 37 years (1953–90), Minister of Communications Kostas Onaitis served 18 years (1968–86), Minister of Justice Pranas Kūris served 13 years (1977–90), etc. The ministries and their organization closely followed examples set by the Ministries of the Soviet Union. For example, in 1957, Nikita Khrushchev introduced sovnarkhoz and abolished many ministries in charge of an industry. The reform was undone and ministries were reinstated during the 1965 Soviet economic reform.

== Chairmen ==
Name	From	To	Notes
Justas Paleckis (1899–1980)	June 17, 1940	August 26, 1940	As head of the People's Government of Lithuania
Mečislovas Gedvilas (1901–1981)	August 26, 1940	January 10, 1956	In exile in Russian SFSR in 1941–44 due to World War II
Motiejus Šumauskas (1905–1982)	January 16, 1956	April 14, 1967	
Juozas Maniušis (1910–1987)	April 14, 1967	January 16, 1981	
Ringaudas Songaila (1929–2019)	January 16, 1981	November 18, 1985	
Vytautas Sakalauskas (1933–2001)	November 18, 1985	March 11, 1990	The council replaced by the Government of Lithuania

== Ministries ==
=== Council of People's Commissars ===
The Council of People's Commissars had the following commissariats:

Main

- Finance: 1940–46
- Trade: 1940–46
- Internal Affairs: 1940–46
- Justice: 1940–46
- Health: 1940–46
- Education: 1940–1946
- State Control: 1940–41, 1944–46
- State Security: 1941–46 (cf. NKGB)
- Labor: 1940–44
- Social Welfare: 1940–44
- Foreign Affairs: 1944–46
- Board of Artistic Affairs: 1941–46

Agriculture and industry

- Food Industry: 1941, 1944–46
- Light Industry: 1945–46
- Meat and Dairy: 1941–46
- Forest Industry: 1941, 1945–46
- Agriculture: 1940–46
- Grain and Husbandry Soviet Farms: 1941–44, 1945–46
- Fish Industry: 1945–46
- Technical Crops: 1946
- Local Industry: 1940–41, 1944–46
- Public Utilities: 1940–41, 1945–46

=== Council of Ministers ===
The Council of Ministers had the following ministries:

Main

- Finance: 1946–90
- Social Welfare: 1946–88
  - Work and Social Welfare: 1988–90
- Health: 1946–90
- Education: 1946–88
  - Higher and Special Education: 1966–88
  - People's Education: 1988–90
- Justice: 1946–59, 1970–90
- Foreign Affairs: 1946–61, 1966–90
- Internal Affairs: 1946–62, 1968–90
  - Security of Public Order: 1962–68
- Culture: 1953–90
  - Cinematography: 1946–53
- Communications: 1955–90
- State Security: 1946–53 (cf. MGB)
- State Control: 1946–58

Food and agriculture

- Agriculture: 1946–62, 1965–85
  - Production of Agricultural Products and Resources: 1962–65
- Food Industry: 1946–53, 1965–85
  - Light and Food Industry: 1953
  - Food Product Industry: 1953–57
- Meat and Dairy Industry: 1946–53, 1965–85
  - Meat and Dairy Product Industry: 1954–57
- Timber Industry: 1946–48, 1951–53, 1954–57
  - Forest and Paper Industry: 1948–51, 1953–54
  - Forestry: 1948–53, 1988–90
  - Forestry and Timber Industry: 1957–88
- Land Reclamation and Water Resources: 1965–90
- Resources: 1961–62, 1969–85
  - Agriculture and Resources: 1953–54
- Soviet Farm: 1947–57
  - Grain and Husbandry Soviet Farms: 1946
- Fish Industry: 1946–53
- Husbandry: 1946–47
- Technical Crops: 1946–47
- Fruit and Vegetable Production: 1981–85
- Grain Products: 1985

Industry and economy

- Trade: 1946–90
- Construction: 1946–54, 1957–88
  - Urban and Rural Construction: 1954–57
  - Rural Construction: 1965–85
- Industry of Construction Materials: 1946–57, 1965–90
- Public Utilities: 1946–57, 1966–90
- Residential Services: 1966–90
- Light Industry: 1946–53, 1955–57, 1965–90
- Local Industry: 1946–53, 1965–90
  - Local and Fuel Industry: 1953–57
- Motor Transport and Highway: 1953–90
  - Road and Transport: 1953
- Cellulose, Paper and Wood Processing Industry: 1965–68
  - Furniture and Wood Processing Industry: 1968–86
  - Furniture and Paper Industry: 1986–90
- Textile Industry: 1955–56

== Members ==
- List of people's commissars of the Lithuanian Soviet Socialist Republic
- List of ministers of the Lithuanian Soviet Socialist Republic
