= Šarūnas =

Šarūnas/Šarūnė
- Pronunciation: [ʃɐˈruːnɐs][ʃɐˈruːne]
- Gender: Šarūnas (m), Šarūnė (f)

Origin
- Origin: Lithuanian
- Meaning: quick, fast
- Region of origin: Lithuania

Šarūnas is a Lithuanian masculine given name. Šarūnė is the feminine form of this name.

The name allegedly comes from the Old Lithuanian word šarus which means "quick" and its forms šariuoti ("to go rapidly", "to scurry"). This name was popularized by Vincas Krėvė-Mickevičius, who wrote a short story about legendary duke of Merkinė named Šarūnas. The days of this name is 19 February..

== Given name ==
- Šarūnas Bartas
- Šarūnas Birutis
- Šarūnas Jasikevičius, professional basketball player and coach, 2005 Israeli Basketball Premier League MVP
- Šarūnas Liekis
- Šarūnas Marčiulionis
- Šarūnas Nakas
- Šarūnas Sakalauskas
- Šarūnas Sauka
- Šarūnas Šulskis
