= Leonas Koganas =

Lithuanian Jewish doctor

Moisiejus Leonas Koganas (February 20, 1894, Šiauliai – May 30, 1956, Vilnius) was a Lithuanian Jewish medical doctor specializing in lung diseases, particularly tuberculosis.

In 1919, he graduated from Moscow University. During World War I, he served as a doctor in the Red Army. In 1921–40 he worked as a physicians in Kaunas. He was one of the first to perform thoracocautery and practice tracheobronchoscopy in Lithuania. After the occupation of Lithuania by the Soviet Union in June 1940, he became Minister of Health in the short-lived People's Government of Lithuania (it was a new ministry; before, there was only the Health Department under the Ministry of Internal Affairs). He spent World War II working at various tuberculosis clinics in the interior of the Soviet Union (Mordovia, Kirghizia, Gorky Oblast, Moscow Oblast). After the war, he returned to Lithuania working in Vilnius as director (1945–46) and deputy director (1947–51) of the Tuberculosis Institute. He became a member of the Communist Party of the Soviet Union in 1947. In the wake of the Doctors' plot, Koganas was arrested in February 1953 and accused of communicating with other arrested doctors, preferring Western treatment methods, and giving poor medical care to various communist workers and activists.
