= Subartonys =

- Village
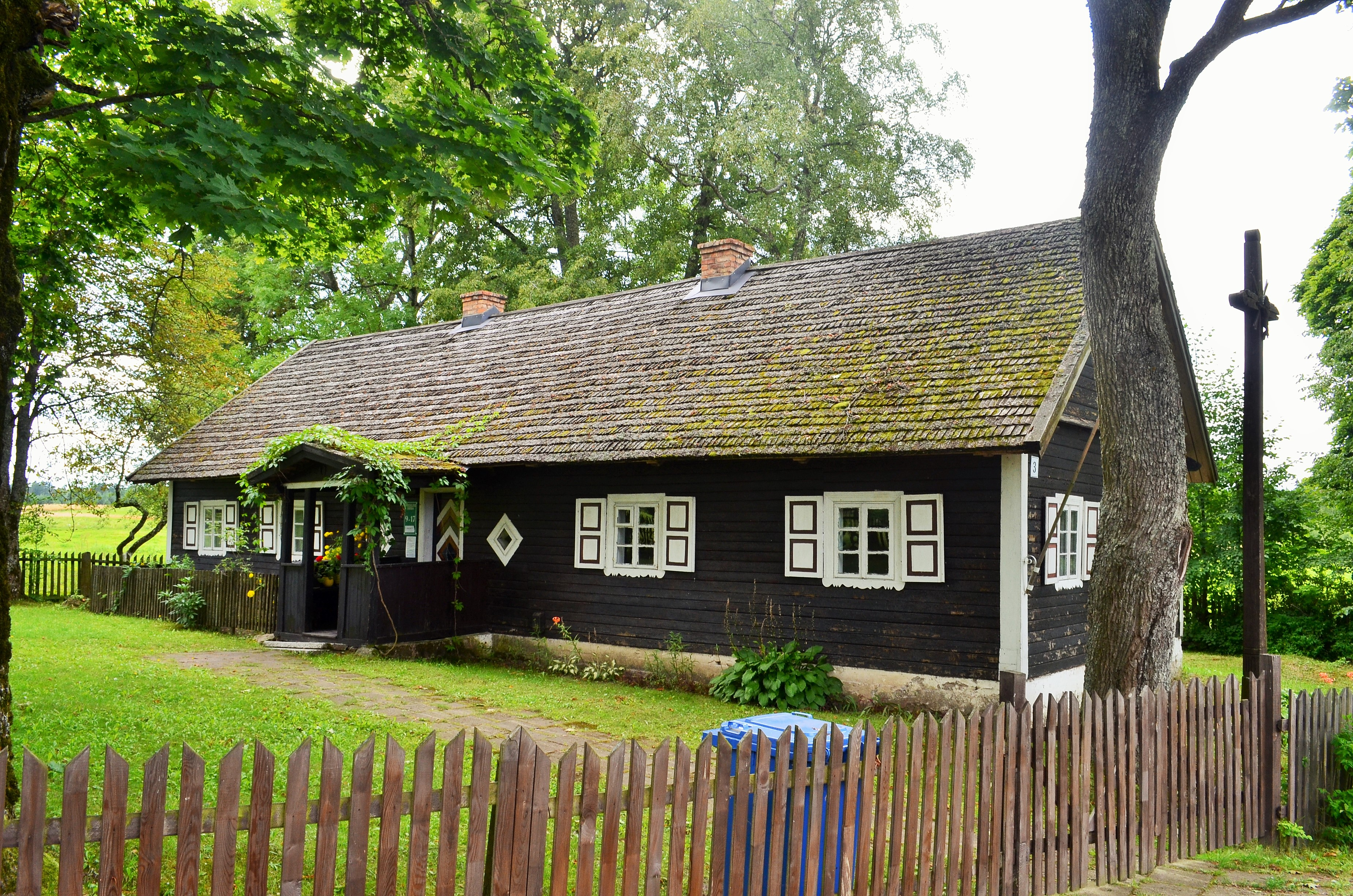
- Interactive map of Subartonys
- Coordinates: 54°12′19″N 24°10′43″E
- Country: Lithuania
- County: Alytus County
- Municipality: Varėna

Population (2001)
  - Total: 75
- Time zone: UTC+2 (EET)
  - Summer (DST): UTC+3 (EEST)

Subartonys is a village in Varėna district municipality, in Alytus County, in southeastern Lithuania. According to the 2001 census, the village had a population of 75 people.

== Notable people ==
- Jan Aleksander Karłowicz (1836–1903), ethnographer
- Vincas Krėvė-Mickevičius (1882–1954), writer, poet, novelist, playwright and philologist
