= Leokadija Diržinskaitė-Piliušenko =

Soviet politician

Leokadija Diržinskaitė-Piliušenko (Леокадия Юозовна Диржинскайте-Пилюшенко; 1921-2008) was a Soviet-Lithuanian Politician Communist. She served as Minister of Foreign Affairs of the Lithuanian SSR in 1961–1976.

== Biography ==
During Lithuania's annexation to the Soviet Union, she served as secretary of the local executive committee. From 1941 to 1951, she worked in the Lithuanian Komsomol. In 1950, she joined the Communist Party of the Soviet Union. A year later, she completed her studies at the Higher Party School in Moscow. In 1951, she served as an instructor for the Šiauliai Regional Committee of the Lithuanian Communist Party (LCP). Two years later, she became secretary of the Šiauliai City Party Committee, later serving as its first secretary. In 1960, she was appointed the first female deputy prime minister of the Lithuanian SSR. A year later, she assumed the post of Minister of Foreign Affairs, a post she held until 1976. In 1962, she was a deputy of the Supreme Soviet of the USSR, where she worked until 1966. In 1976, she was Deputy Chair of Presidium of the Supreme Council of the Lithuanian SSR until 1985.

== Awards ==
- Four Orders of the Red Banner of Labor (1960, 1965, 1971, and 1976)
- Order of Friendship of Peoples (1981)
