= Tatjana Jančaitytė =

Soviet-Lithuanian politician

Tatjana Jančaitytė (3 January 1911 – 1999) was a Soviet-Lithuanian politician. She served as the Minister of Social Affairs of the Lithuanian SSR in 1960–1973.

== Biography ==
Jančaitytė was born on 3 January 1911 in Žečkalniai in the present-day Šakiai District Municipality. She did not receive a more extensive education and from an early age worked in the agriculture. In 1933, she joined the Lithuanian Communist Party which was outlawed at the time. For her communist activities, she was imprisoned in 1933, 1934, and 1936. Her brother Alfonsas Jančaitis was also a communist who joined the 16th Rifle Division of the Red Army during World War II.

After the Soviet occupation of Lithuania in June 1940, Jančaitytė became head of the communist district committee in Šakiai. When Germany invaded the Soviet Union in 1941, she retreated from Lithuania and worked at the local communist committee in Soligalichsky District, Kostroma Oblast. In 1944, she returned to Lithuania and rejoined the district committee in Šakiai as the second secretary. In 1945, she was promoted to the first secretary. In May 1949, she was accused of accounting irregularities. She was reprimanded and ordered to return 1400 rubles to the party. However, she was defended by First Secretary Antanas Sniečkus and the reprimand did not interrupt her communist career.

When oblasts were introduced in Lithuania in 1950, she became secretary of the Kaunas oblast committee and worked there until 1952. After graduation from the Higher Party School in 1955, she become the first secretary of the district committee in Kėdainiai. In 1960, she was appointed as the Minister of Social Affairs and served until 1973.

Jančaitytė was also a member of the Central Committee of the Lithuanian Communist Party in 1949–1952 and 1956–1964 and its Audit Committee in 1966–1976. She was elected to the Supreme Soviet of the Lithuanian SSR in 1947–1971 and was a member of its Presidium in 1959–1963. She was also elected to the Supreme Soviet of the Soviet Union in 1950–1954.

Jančaitytė died in 1999.
