= Vincas Krėvė-Mickevičius =

Lithuanian writer, poet, novelist, playwright and philologist

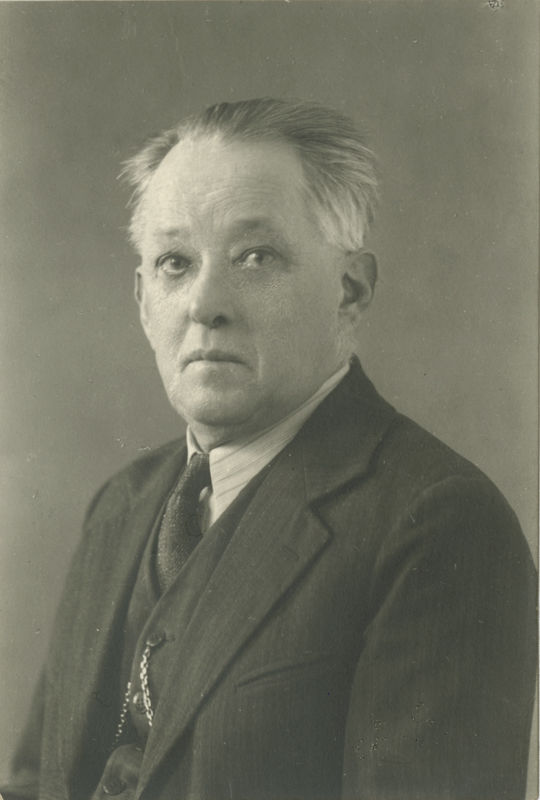
- Krėvė-Mickevičius in 1939

Prime Minister of Lithuania
- In office 24 June 1940 – 1 July 1940

Chairman of Lithuanian Nationalist Union
- In office 19 August 1924 – 29 June 1925

Personal details
- Born: 19 October 1882 Subartonys, Russian Empire
- Died: 7 June 1954 (aged 71) Broomall, Pennsylvania, U.S.
- Party: Lithuanian Nationalist Union (1924–1926)
- Spouse: Rebeka Karak (m. 1913)
- Children: Ona Aldona Mickevičiūtė-Mošinskienė (1914–2005)
- Education: Lviv University

Vincas Mickevičius (Polish: Wincenty Mickiewicz, 19 October 1882 – 17 July 1954), better known by his pen name Vincas Krėvė-Mickevičius, was a Lithuanian writer, poet, novelist, playwright and philologist. He is also known as Vincas Krėvė, the shortened name he used in the United States.

== Biography ==
Vincas Mickevičius was born to a family of peasant farmers on 19 October 1882, in the village of Subartonys in the Dzūkija ethnographic region of Lithuania. His family was called Krėvė by the local villagers, the name that he later used for his pen name. The customs and traditions of his native district were a constant source of the inspiration for his literary work.

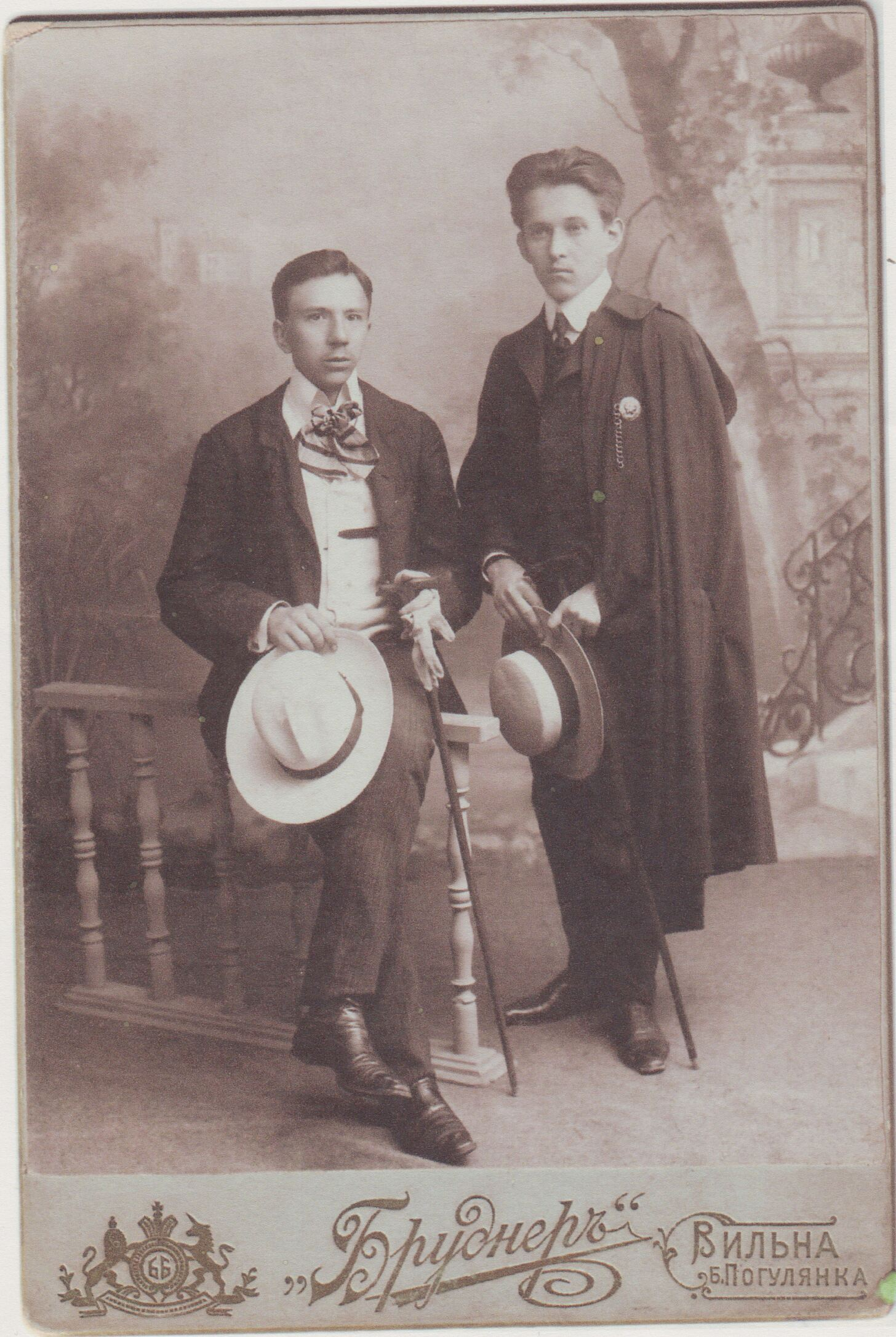
Vincas Krėvė and Liudas Gira, early 20th century

In 1898, he became a student at the Vilnius Priest Seminary, but was expelled in 1900 due to lack of calling. In 1904, he enrolled the University of Kyiv. However, a year later, the university was temporarily closed due to the revolutionary conditions in the Russian Empire, and Krėvė-Mickevičius, unwilling to interrupt his studies, entered the University of Lviv, in Galicia, which was at the time part of the Austrian Empire, and in 1908, he received his doctorate in philology. That same year, the University of Kyiv awarded him a gold medal for his thesis on the original home of the Indo-Europeans. In 1913, the University of Kyiv awarded him the degree of Master of Comparative Linguistics for his dissertation on the origin of the names Buddha and Pratjekabuddha.

In 1909, Krėvė-Mickevičius became a high school teacher in the city of Baku, Azerbaijan. Three years later he assisted in founding the People's University of Baku, and delivered lectures there.

Lithuania achieved independence in 1918, and a year later, Krėvė-Mickevičius became Lithuanian consul in Azerbaijan. In 1920, he returned to Lithuania, and settled in Kaunas, which at the time was the temporary capital.

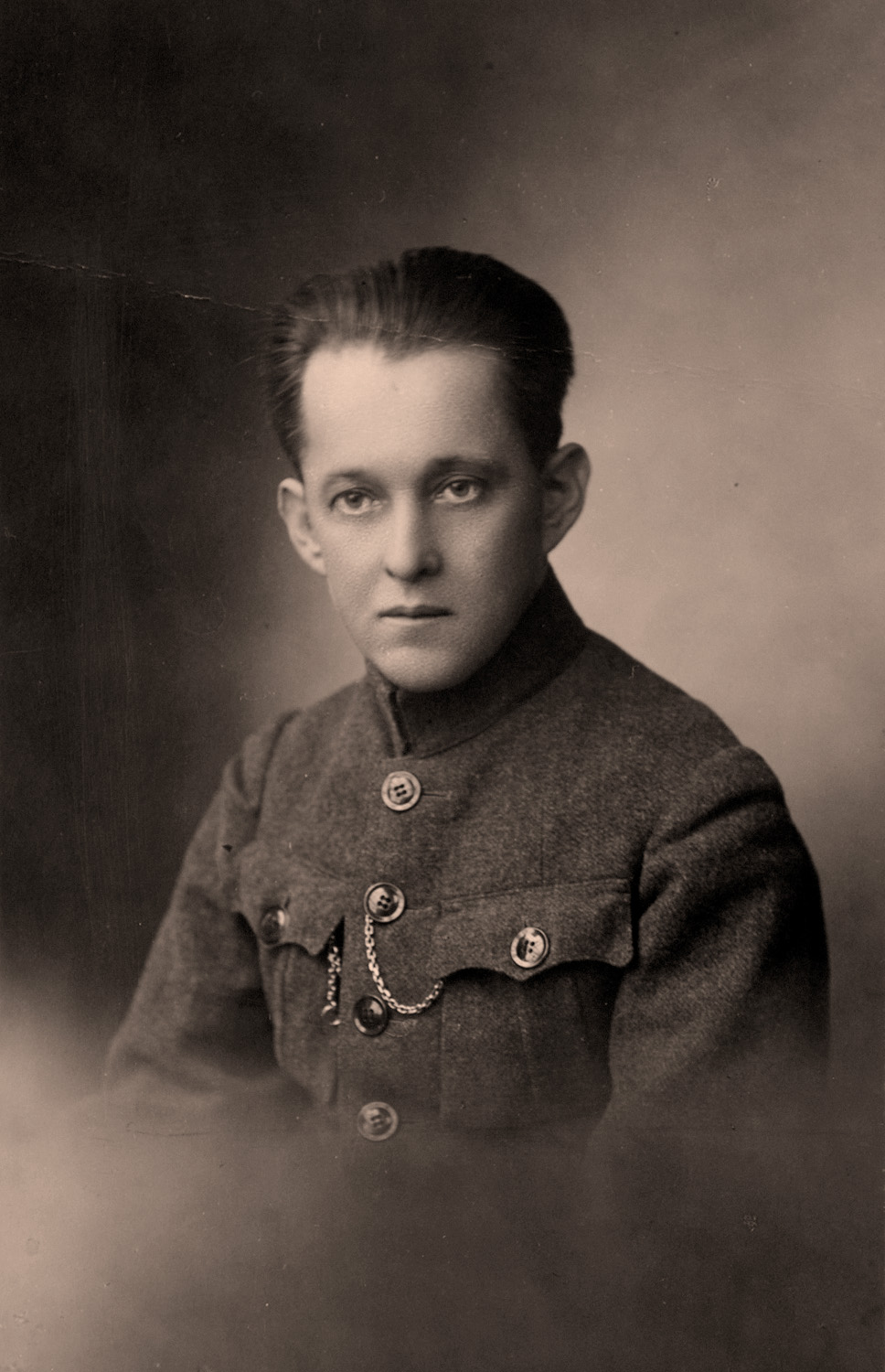
Krėvė-Mickevičius in 1921

When the University of Lithuania was founded in 1922, Vincas Krėvė-Mickevičius became professor of Slavic languages and literature, and remained there as part of the faculty for the following two decades.

His first attempts on writing came at the age fifteen, at first using Russian and Polish languages; however, after 1902, he wrote in Lithuanian. The first volume of his collected works was published in 1921, at which time he was already a well-known and respected figure, serving as editor of several academic and literary periodicals.

On 24 June 1940, he was appointed as Prime Minister of Lithuania by acting President Justas Paleckis. He headed the "People's Government of Lithuania", which was formed essentially as a rubber stamp for the Soviet takeover of Lithuania. On 1 July 1940, he, together with some other communists, visited Vyacheslav Molotov (Soviet Minister of Foreign Affairs) and asked for full annexation of Lithuania into the Soviet Union (this visit was later used as the pretext for that de jure annexation, although occupation and the de facto annexation happened before that). On returning, he offered his resignation, which was not accepted at the time.

After the start of the Nazi occupation of Lithuania in 1941, and the closing of higher educational institutions in 1943, Krėvė-Mickevičius went into hiding. Soviet forces reoccupied Lithuania in 1944, at which point he fled the country and settled in a displaced persons camp at Glasenbach, near Salzburg, Austria. There, he taught at the local camp's high school. In 1947, the University of Pennsylvania extended an invitation to join its faculty. There, he served as an assistant professor of Slavic Languages and Literatures until 1953, when he retired. On 17 July 1954, Vincas Krėvė-Mickevičius died in Broomall, Pennsylvania, United States.

He was considered as a candidate for the Nobel Prize in Literature.

== Literature ==
The literary production of Vincas Krėvė-Mickevičius was wide and varied. It included historical dramas, collections of folklore, short stories and sketches of village life, novels on contemporary problems, and tales based on oriental themes. At his death he was engaged on a major work entitled Sons of Heaven and Earth, which defies classification. It is written partly as drama and partly as a narrative; its subjects are biblical with the action taking place in Palestine at the beginning of the Christian era. His work, filled with a romantic impulse, drawing attention to rural life and oriental themes, is balanced with realistic narration and description. His writing is characterized by an unusually large vocabulary with a remarkable purity.

== Works ==
- Šarūnas, Dainavos kunigaikštis (Šarūnas, Duke of Dainava), 1911
- Dainavos šalies senų žmonių padavimai (Old people's myths from the land of Dainava), 1912
- Žentas (Son-in-law), 1922
- Šiaudinėj pastogėj (Under the thatched roof), 1922
- Skirgaila (Skirgaila), 1922
- Dainavos krašto liaudies dainos (Folk Songs of Dainava Region), 1924
- Likimo keliais (Along the Paths of Destiny), 1926-1929
- Rytų pasakos (Tales of the Orient), 1930
- Sparnuočiai liaudies padavimuose (Winged creatures in the folklore myths), 1933
- Karaliaus Mindaugo mirtis (The death of King Mindaugas), 1935
- Patarlės ir priežodžiai, 1934–37
- Raganius (He-witch), 1939
- Miglose (In the mists), 1940
- Dangaus ir žemės sūnūs (Sons of Heaven and Earth), 1949

== Legacy ==
In 1997, a museum to Krėvė-Mickevičius was opened in his last residence before emigration in Vilnius, Lithuania. A road in the Dainava district of Kaunas, Lithuania (Vinco Krėvės prospektas) is also named after him.
