= People's Government of Lithuania =

Puppet government in Lithuania installed by the Soviet Union (June - August 1940)

The People's Government of Lithuania (Lithuanian: Liaudies vyriausybė) was a puppet cabinet installed by the Soviet Union in Lithuania immediately after Lithuania's acceptance of the Soviet ultimatum of June 14, 1940. The formation of the cabinet was supervised by Vladimir Dekanozov, deputy of Vyacheslav Molotov and a close associate of Lavrentiy Beria, who selected Justas Paleckis as the prime minister and acting president. The government was formed on June 17 and, together with the People's Seimas (parliament), transitioned independent Lithuania to a socialist republic and the 14th republic of the Soviet Union thus legitimizing the Soviet occupation of Lithuania. The People's Government was replaced by the Council of People's Commissars of the Lithuanian SSR on August 25. Similar transitional People's Governments were formed in Latvia (Prime Minister Augusts Kirhenšteins supervised by Andrey Vyshinsky) and Estonia (Prime Minister Johannes Vares supervised by Andrei Zhdanov).

== Formation ==
The Molotov–Ribbentrop Pact divided Eastern Europe into spheres of influence. The Baltic states became part of the Russian sphere. Instead of outright military invasion, the Soviet Union followed semi-legal procedures to legitimize its occupation of Lithuania. The plan of action was developed by the Politburo of the Communist Party of the Soviet Union in September–October 1939 when the Soviet Union annexed territories of Poland. The first step was the Soviet–Lithuanian Mutual Assistance Treaty of October 1939: Lithuania agreed to station up to 20,000 Soviet troops in exchange for a portion of the Vilnius Region. Next was the Soviet ultimatum of June 14, 1940 that demanded the formation of a new government more capable of adhering to the Mutual Assistance Pact and to allow a "sufficiently large" number of Soviet troops to enter Lithuanian territory.

The Lithuanian government debated the response to the ultimatum on the night of June 13–14 and decided to accept it unconditionally because effective military resistance against a much larger Red Army was virtually impossible. During the debate, Prime Minister Antanas Merkys resigned, making way for General Stasys Raštikis, who was previously given tacit approval by Vyacheslav Molotov. However, Raštikis was not approved by Molotov and Merkys continued as acting prime minister. Vladimir Dekanozov was dispatched from Moscow to oversee formation of an acceptable government. President Antanas Smetona, fearing Soviet persecutions, fled to Nazi Germany and later Switzerland. Before leaving, he transferred presidential duties to Merkys, as per the Constitution. A day later, however, Merkys announced on national radio that he had deposed Smetona and was now president in his own right.

On the morning of June 16, the Lithuanian government decided that Smetona's departure was in effect a resignation and granted full presidential powers to Merkys, while Kazys Bizauskas became acting prime minister. At the same time, Minister of Defence Kazys Musteikis, who fled to Germany with Smetona, was replaced by Vincas Vitkauskas. It appears that the Lithuanians were acting on their own accord and that Dekanozov was not involved in making this transition. On June 17, Merkys appointed Justas Paleckis as the new prime minister and confirmed a new cabinet, which became known as the People's Government. Merkys then resigned. Paleckis ascended to the presidency, and appointed writer Vincas Krėvė-Mickevičius as prime minister.

Scholars continue to debate whether the successive changes in the government were constitutional. While care was given to observe constitutional formalities as much as possible, the changes were made under duress and under the influence of a foreign occupying power. After Lithuania regained independence in 1990, it took the line that since Smetona never resigned, Merkys and Paleckis had no claim to the presidency, and therefore all acts leading up to the Soviet takeover were void.

== Membership ==
In the first days of occupation, Dekanozov focused the public's attention on the "cowardly" flight of Smetona and portrayed the changes in Lithuania as the destruction of his authoritarian regime. The public was told that the Soviets would protect and respect Lithuanian independence. Lithuanian activists, including Vincas Krėvė-Mickevičius, claimed that they believed the Soviets and had hopes to restore democratic Lithuania as it existed prior to the 1926 coup. In the meantime, Dekanozov worked to recruit a sympathetic but non-communist government that could be easily manipulated into implementing various sovietization policies. Indeed, none of the first ministers of the People's Government were communists. The fact that the Soviets did not immediately install a communist government calmed people's nerves. In addition, the Communist Party of Lithuania, which had been outlawed and persecuted in independent Lithuania, was small, weak, and not yet ready for the job of running a government. Moscow also considered it unreliable due to suspected influence of Trotskyism among its ranks.

For Prime Minister, Dekanozov selected a known leftist journalist and fellow traveler Justas Paleckis. Later, in his memoirs, Paleckis claimed that the offer came as a complete surprise. Krėvė-Mickevičius, a writer, was selected for the second most important post. He gave the new government a desired public image. He became perhaps the most controversial figure of the People's Government. He was the first to voice his objections to incorporation of Lithuania into the Soviet Union. On July 1, after an in-person meeting with Molotov, Krėvė-Mickevičius submitted his resignation, but Paleckis refused it. He then took an extended vacation and was replaced by communist Mečislovas Gedvilas. Ernestas Galvanauskas remained as minister of finance. Having served as prime minister twice, Galvanauskas was an established political leader and opponent of Smetona's regime. General Vincas Vitkauskas was a veteran of the Lithuanian Wars of Independence and Klaipėda Revolt. The government thus appeared to be left-leaning but non-communist.

== Activities ==
On June 17, six initial members of the new government were sworn in. Paleckis was unprepared for the role as prime minister and had little idea of what he should be doing. However, the very next day, he announced a government program, apparently handed to him by Dekanozov. The program denounced Smetona's regime and stressed friendly relationship with the Soviet Union. In internal matters, the program called for disbandment of the Fourth Seimas (the parliament), release of political prisoners (many of them communists), reforms in education and healthcare. The program made no mention of far-reaching social and economic reforms needed to convert Lithuania into a socialist republic.

== Cabinet members ==
- Prime minister and acting president: Justas Paleckis
- Acting prime minister and Minister of Foreign Affairs: Vincas Krėvė-Mickevičius (until July 1)
- Minister of Internal Affairs: Mečislovas Gedvilas (from June 19)
- Minister of Defense: general Vincas Vitkauskas
- Minister of Finance: Ernestas Galvanauskas (until July 1), Juozas Vaišnoras (from July 5)
- Minister of Agriculture: Matas Mickis
- Minister of Education: Antanas Venclova (from June 18)
- Minister of Justice: Povilas Pakarklis (from June 18)
- Minister of Communications: Stasys Pupeikis (from July 1)
- Minister of Health (new ministry): Leonas Koganas
- Minister of Labor (new ministry): Mykolas Junčas-Kučinskas (from June 27)

== See also ==
- People's Parliament
