= Juozas Maniušis =

Soviet politician (1910–1987)

Juozas Maniušis (25 December [O.S. 12 December] 1910 – 17 March 1987) was a communist politician in the Lithuanian SSR specializing in areas of industry, construction, and engineering. Between 1967 and 1981 he was chairman of the Council of Ministers (equivalent to Prime Minister). He earned PhD in economics in 1970.

Maniušis graduated from a pedagogic institute in Minsk in 1931 and from a road building institute in Leningrad in 1938. During World War II he served in the Red Army, joining the Communist Party of the Soviet Union in 1945. After the war he moved to Lithuania where he worked as deputy chairman of Vilnius and chairman of Kaunas committees of the Lithuanian Communist Party (1944–1950). Between 1950 and 1955, he was Minister of Construction. From 1955 to 1967 he worked as Secretary of the Central Committee of the Lithuanian Communist Party. In 1967 he became the Chairman of the Council of Ministers. He was one of the very few top Soviet functionaries who were not native Lithuanians. After retirement from politics in 1981, he headed the Institute of Economy of the Lithuanian Academy of Sciences until 1985.

He was awarded two Orders of Lenin, Order of the October Revolution, Order of the Patriotic War (2nd class), three Orders of the Red Banner of Labour, and Order of the Badge of Honour.
