= Šarūnas Liekis =

Lithuanian historian and political scientist

Šarūnas Liekis is a Lithuanian historian and political scientist. He is Professor of Politics and dean of the faculty of politics and diplomacy at the Vytautas Magnus University (since 2010). He is an expert on inter-ethnic relations and conflicts.

Liekis studied at Vilnius University 1987–1993 (earning an MA), at the University of Oxford 1991–1992 (earning a Diploma), at the Hebrew University of Jerusalem 1995–1996, at Brandeis University 1993–1998 (earning a PhD), and earned the Habilitation at Vilnius University in 2005.

He worked as a diplomat 1992–1993, as a research and teaching assistant at Brandeis University 1993–1997, as Director of Programs at the Open Society Fund Lithuania 1997–2001, as deputy director of the Center for Stateless Cultures at Vilnius University 1998–2000, as assistant professor of history at Vilnius University 1999–2000, and as Miles Lerman Research Fellow of the Center for the Advanced Holocaust Studies at the United States Holocaust Memorial Museum 2001–2002.

He has served, inter alia, as an expert for the Lithuanian government Department for Minorities (since 2003), country deputy expert for the European Commission against Racism and Intolerance (ECRI) at the Council of Europe (since 2002), and country deputy expert for the EU Fundamental Rights Agency in Vienna (since 2003).

== Selected publications ==
- A State within a State? Jewish Autonomy in Lithuania 1918–1925, Vilnius, Versus Aureus, 2003
- The European Union and Its New Neighborhood: Different Countries, Common Interests, two volumes, Vilnius, Mykolas Romeris University, 2005
- 1939: The Year that Changed Everything in Lithuania's History, Amsterdam, Rodopi, 2010
