= Juozas Bartašiūnas =

Juozas Bartašiūnas (12 July 1897 – 25 August 1972) was a Soviet state security officer who served as People's Commissar of Internal Affairs (NKVD) of the Lithuanian SSR.

== Biography ==
Bartašiūnas was born in to a poor Lithuanian peasant family. From December 1912 he worked as a stevedore in the port of Riga. In May 1915 he was drafted into the Imperial Russian Army and served in the Smolensk and Livonia Governorates, and from April 1916 to January 1918 on the German Front. Then, after demobilization, he joined the Latvian Rifle Regiment of the Red Army in Moscow. From June to August 1918 he served on the Eastern Front of the Russian Civil War, after which he became a company politruk in a Latvian Rifle Regiment on the Western and then Southern Fronts. From November 1920 to June 1921 he was a politruk in the Kherson Governorate. He became a member of the Russian Communist Party in 1919.

From June 1921, Bartašiūnas worked in the organs of the provincial Cheka in Smolensk, then held positions in the organs of the OGPU Western Military District and the Belarusian Military District, in the Border Troops of the OGPU in Soviet Belarus, and in the NKVD troops of the Baltic Military District. On March 26, 1936, he was awarded the rank of colonel.

In 19940-41he sas Head of the Special Department of the NKVD 29th Infantry Corps, from 1941 to 1944 Head of the Special Department of the NKVD/Counterintelligence Department of the 16th Infantry Division. On February 14, 1944, he was appointed Colonel of State Security and on September 22, 1944, Commissar of State Security. From July 1944 to March 1953, Bartašiūnas became People's Commissar/Minister of Internal Affairs of the Lithuanian SSR. He was promoted to Major General from July 9, 1945. He directed the activities of the NKVD security apparatus and troops in combating the anti-communist and anti-Soviet underground (including Polish) in the Lithuanian SSR.

From December 30, 1944, to February 15, 1949, he was a member of the Politburo of the Central Committee of the Communist Party of Lithuania, and from February 19, 1949, to September 22, 1952, a deputy member of the Politburo of the Central Committee of the CPL. On May 30, 1953, he retired from service in the security services. He was a deputy to the Supreme Soviet of the USSR of the second convocation.
