= Mečislovas Gedvilas =

Lithuanian and Soviet politician

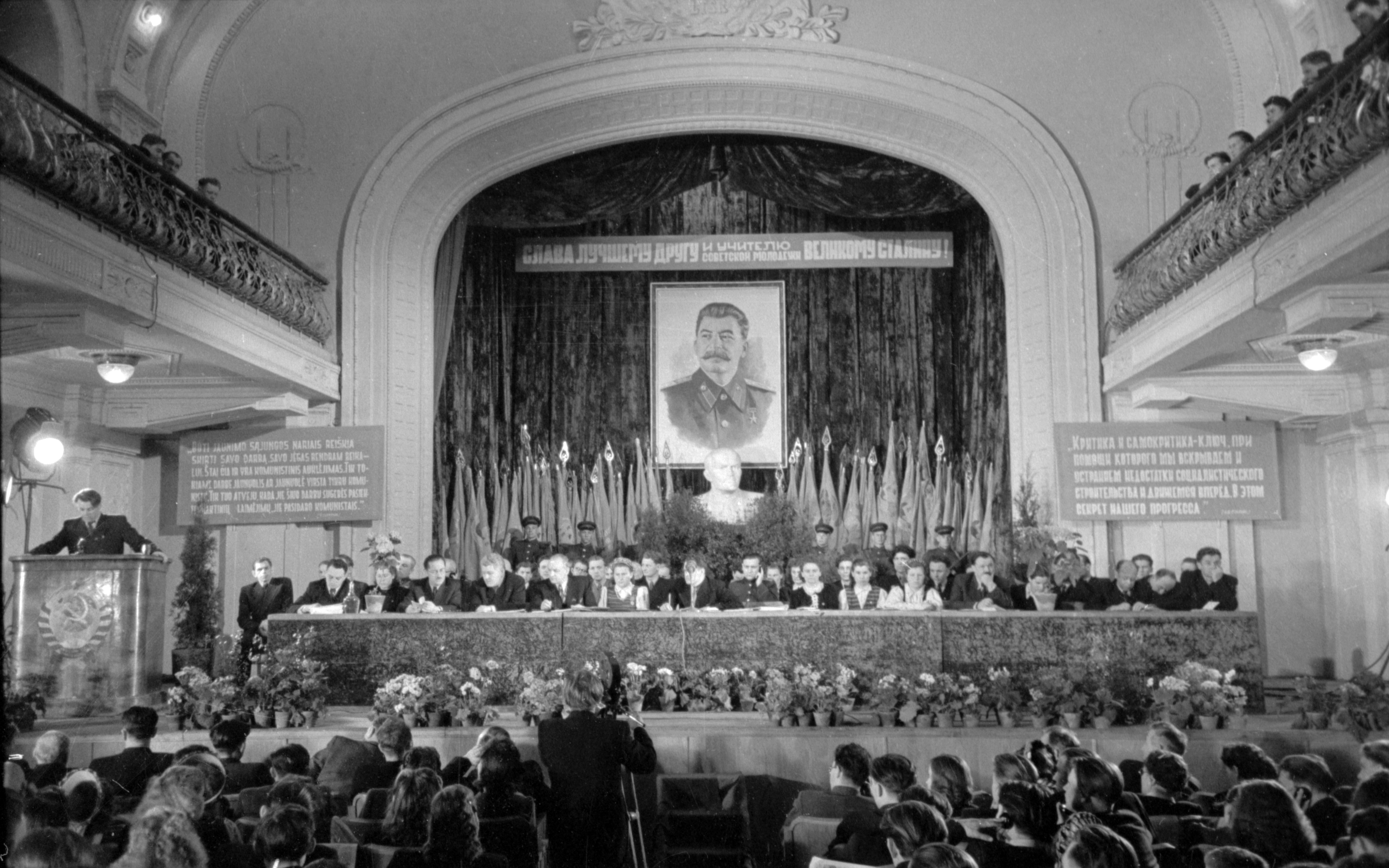
- Gedvilas (4th from left) at the 6th Congress of the Lithuanian Communist Youth, 1951

Chairman of the Council of People's Commissars of the Lithuanian SSR
- In office 25 August 1940 – 2 April 1946
- Preceded by: Position established
- Succeeded by: Position abolished

Chairman of the Council of Ministers of the Lithuanian SSR
- In office 2 April 1946 – 16 January 1956
- Preceded by: Position established
- Succeeded by: Motiejus Šumauskas

Personal details
- Born: 19 October 1901 Bubiai, Kovno Governorate, Russian Empire
- Died: 15 February 1981 (aged 79) Vilnius, Lithuanian Soviet Socialist Republic, Soviet Union
- Party: Communist Party of Lithuania (1934-81)
- Other political affiliations: Communist Party of the Soviet Union
- Education: Saint Petersburg State Institute of Technology

Mečislovas Gedvilas (19 October 1901 – 15 February 1981) was a Lithuanian Communist politician who collaborated with occupying Soviet forces. He served as the first Prime Minister of the Lithuanian SSR from 1940 to 1956. Rivalry between him and Antanas Sniečkus, the first secretary of the Lithuanian Communist Party, led to his demotion to Minister of Education (1957–1973).

== Early life and career ==
Born at Bubiai in Kovno Governorate in 1901, Gedvilas and his family were deported to Russia for violation of the Lithuanian press ban in 1904. At first they moved to Rybinsk and then to Pavlovsk near Saint Petersburg. Gedvilas studied at the Saint Petersburg State Institute of Technology from 1919 to 1922. After returning to Lithuania he worked as a teacher of algebra, geometry, bookkeeping in Palanga (1923–1927) but was dismissed for not having any pedagogical education or qualifications. He supported left-wing political organizations and publications. In 1926, he joined the Lithuanian Popular Peasants' Union but quickly became disappointed by its conservatism and left it in 1931. After the Tauragė Revolt in September 1927, Gedvilas was sent to the Varniai concentration camp for two months even though he was not involved in the revolt.

After his release from Varniai, Gedvilas settled in Telšiai and worked as editor of several newspapers, including Žemaitis, Žibintas, Darbo žemaitis, that were critical of the authoritarian regime of Antanas Smetona. For these activities he was briefly jailed several times. In 1931, Gedvilas was elected to the board of the state patient fund in Telšiai and worked as its director until 1940. Troubles with the law enforcement brought Gedvilas closer to the communist activists. In 1934, he joined the Communist Party of Lithuania. The same year, he was elected to the Telšiai city council. He was a board member of the Freethinkers' Society of Ethical Culture.

== In Soviet Lithuania ==
After the Soviet ultimatum in June 1940, Gedvilas became Minister of Internal Affairs in the People's Government and was elected to the People's Seimas where he became the first vice-chairman. He helped to transition Lithuania into the Lithuanian Soviet Socialist Republic, thus legitimizing the Soviet occupation.

Gedvilas served as Chairman of the Council of People's Commissars of Lithuania (in 1946 renamed to the Council of Ministers) from 25 August 1940 to 16 January 1956 (position equivalent to Prime Minister). In this capacity he supervised Sovietization of Lithuania and signed off on persecution orders, including the mass deportation of Lithuanians into Gulags and other forced settlements. In 1944, he led a delegation that signed an agreement with the Polish Committee of National Liberation that led to the repatriation of Poles.

From 1952 to 1956, he was a candidate to the Central Committee of the Communist Party of the Soviet Union. In 1957, Gedvilas was demoted to Minister of Education due to tensions and political rivalry between him and Antanas Sniečkus, the first secretary of the Lithuanian Communist Party. Gedvilas is credited for rebuilding a number of schools and introducing eleven-year secondary education. In 1950–1972, 302 schools were built and another 935 expanded. He retired from the ministry in 1973. Gedvilas was a delegate of the Supreme Soviet of the Lithuanian SSR in 1940–1975 and of the Supreme Soviet of the Soviet Union in 1941–1962. In 1975, he published a memoir book Lemtingas posūkis (The Fateful Change), which was translated into Russian in 1979. The book contained essays and speeches regarding World War II (1940–1945). In total, he wrote about 600 articles to various Lithuanian periodicals. He died in 1981 and was buried in Antakalnis Cemetery.

== Awards ==
Gedvilas was awarded numerous Soviet medals and orders, including four Orders of Lenin, Order of the October Revolution, Order of the Patriotic War (1st and 2nd class), Order of the Red Banner of Labour, Order of Friendship of Peoples. In 1945, he was awarded the Polish Order of the Cross of Grunwald (1st class).
