= Motiejus Šumauskas =

Lithuanian communist activist and Soviet politician

Motiejus or Matas Šumauskas (2 October 1905 – 28 May 1982) was a Lithuanian communist activist and Soviet politician. He served as the chairman of the Council of Ministers (equivalent to Prime Minister) from 1956 to 1963 and chairman of the presidium of the Supreme Soviet of the Lithuanian SSR (de jure head of state) from 1967 to 1975.

== Life ==
Šumauskas received only primary education and earned a living working at a printing press. He joined the Lithuanian Communist Party in 1924. For his communist activities he was jailed in 1929, served a six-year sentence from 1931 to 1937, and was imprisoned again in 1939. Šumauskas was freed after the Soviet ultimatum in June 1940 and was elected to the People's Seimas. He became chairman of the trade unions and People's Commissar of Local Industry of the Lithuanian SSR. During World War II he retreated to the Russian SFSR, joined the 16th Rifle Division and was a Soviet partisan leader in the environs of Švenčionys and Lake Narach.

After the war, Šumauskas became deputy chairman of the Council of People's Commissars (1944–1950, 1953–1954). He replaced Mečislovas Gedvilas as the chairman of the Council of Ministers in 1956. Gedvilas was demoted to Minister of Education due to tensions between him and Antanas Sniečkus, the First Secretary of the Lithuanian Communist Party. From 1967 to 1975 Šumauskas served as the chairman of the presidium of the Supreme Soviet of the Lithuanian SSR and the deputy chairman of the presidium of the Supreme Soviet of the Soviet Union. He was also a member of the Politburo of the Central Committee of the Lithuanian Communist Party.
